= Foreign Cattle Market =

Livestock market in Deptford, London, England

Coordinates: 51.4865°N 0.0276°W

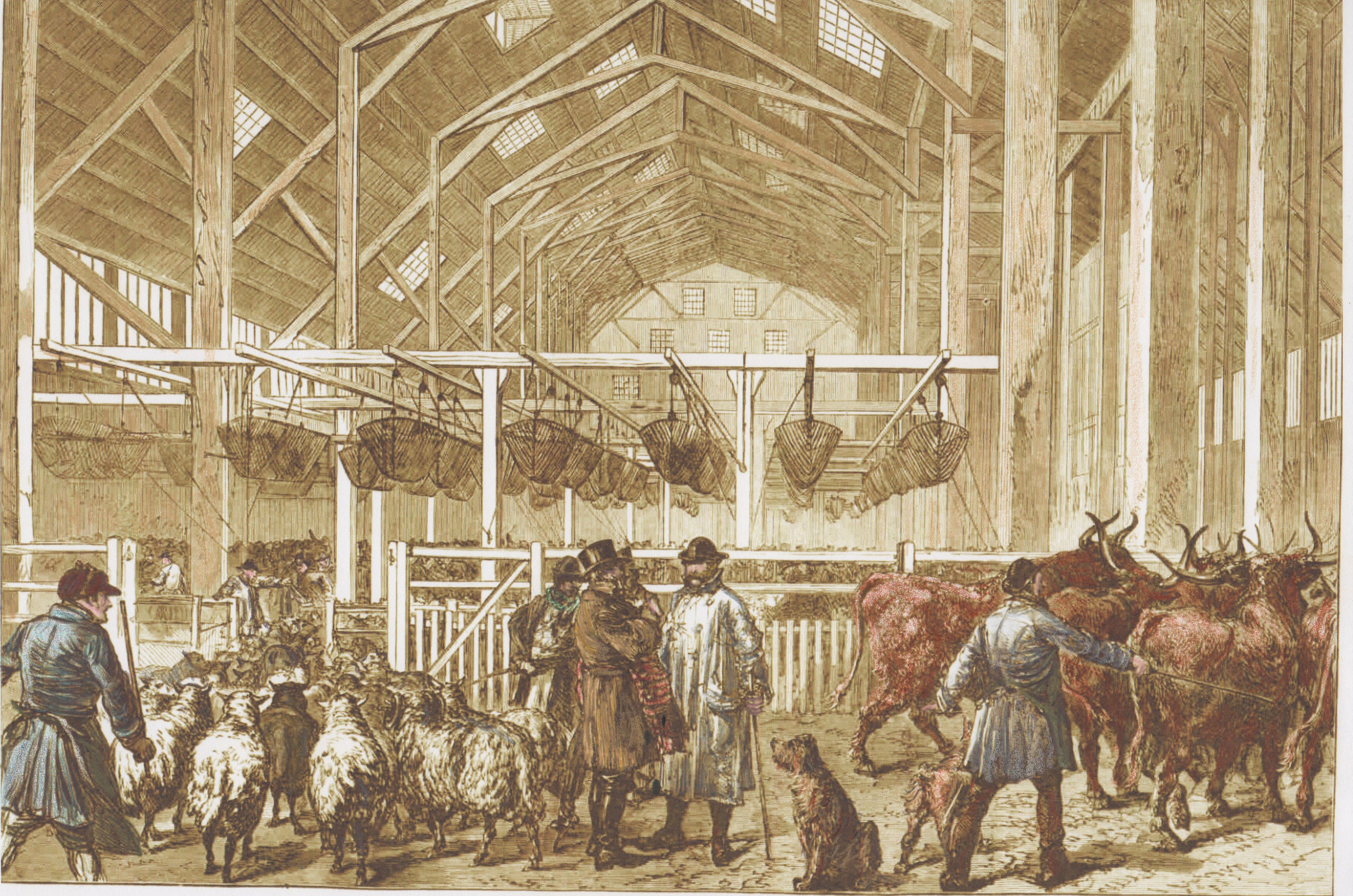
"The New Foreign Cattle Market, Deptford: the Central Shed", Illustrated London News, 2 February 1872

The Foreign Cattle Market (1872–1913) was one of the two great livestock markets of London. Situated at the former royal Deptford Dockyard on a bend of the River Thames and owned by the City of London, all animals came from overseas, were landed by cattle boat, kept under quarantine conditions, and had to be slaughtered within 10 days of disembarkation. None could leave the market alive: the purpose was to stop the importation of animal diseases. Besides cattle, the market handled sheep, pigs and a few others. It could shelter 8,500 cattle and 20,000 sheep at a time, and had 70 slaughterhouses. It supplied about half the capital's freshly killed meat.

More than a set of buildings in Deptford, it had trading links with four continents: part of what has been called the first globalisation. Cattle were brought there from the great grasslands of the world: initially, from Western Europe, Austria-Hungary and the steppes of the Russian Empire 30° to the east; but later, and mostly, from the Great Plains of America, literally being rounded up by cowboys. Such was the volume and quality of the trade that it had an appreciable impact on the livestock industry of the American and Canadian West. Boats also brought live animals across the equator from the pampas of Argentina, and even from the other side of the globe: Australia and New Zealand.

In stormy weather numbers of animals were fatally injured, washed overboard, or jettisoned to save the vessel; others were stifled to death under closed hatches. Prior to the sea voyages most had endured long journeys on tightly packed cattle trains. Both on trains and ships severe methods were used to make recumbent cattle stand up—in case they were trampled to death. The intercontinental traffic in live animals was not actually necessary, because it was cheaper to import chilled meat, which was of good quality. Yet the Foreign Cattle Market survived for 40 years; possibly because of irrational prejudice, possibly because butchers could pass off Deptford-killed meat as Scotch or English meat, which sold at a premium.

== Background: London's cattle markets ==
=== The end of Smithfield as a livestock market ===
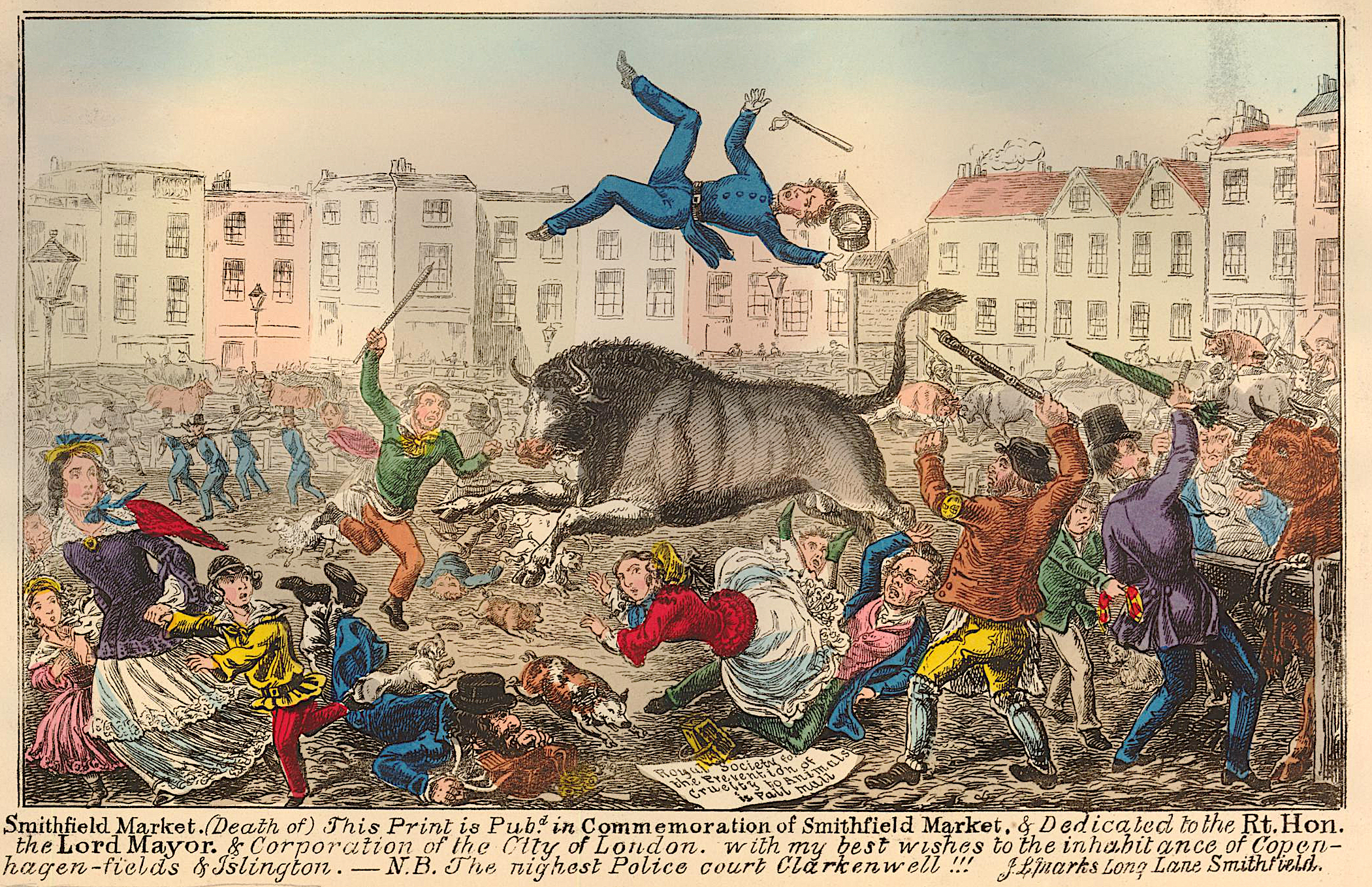
Demise of overcrowded Smithfield cattle market (satirical print, 1855: British Museum)

For centuries the main cattle market for London had been held at Smithfield. There being no refrigeration, butchers bought an animal at the market, and slaughtered it themselves. The site was small and by the Victorian era the volume of trade had increased to the point that it was badly overcrowded and a public health nuisance. Driving cattle to Smithfield through the thoroughfares of the metropolis e.g. Oxford Street was bad for traffic congestion and endangered life and limb.

Hence Parliament passed the Metropolitan Market Act 1851 (14 & 15 Vict. c. 61) which moved London's livestock market to a site in Islington. Later, Smithfield acquired a new role: it was rebuilt as a dead meat market; the one that stands today. (From thence, until the supermarket era, most Londoners purchased their meat at butchers who bought it wholesale at Smithfield. Thus by 1895 Smithfield was providing 130 pounds (59 kg) of meat annually "for every man, woman and child within 15 miles of Charing Cross".)

=== The Metropolitan Cattle Market ===
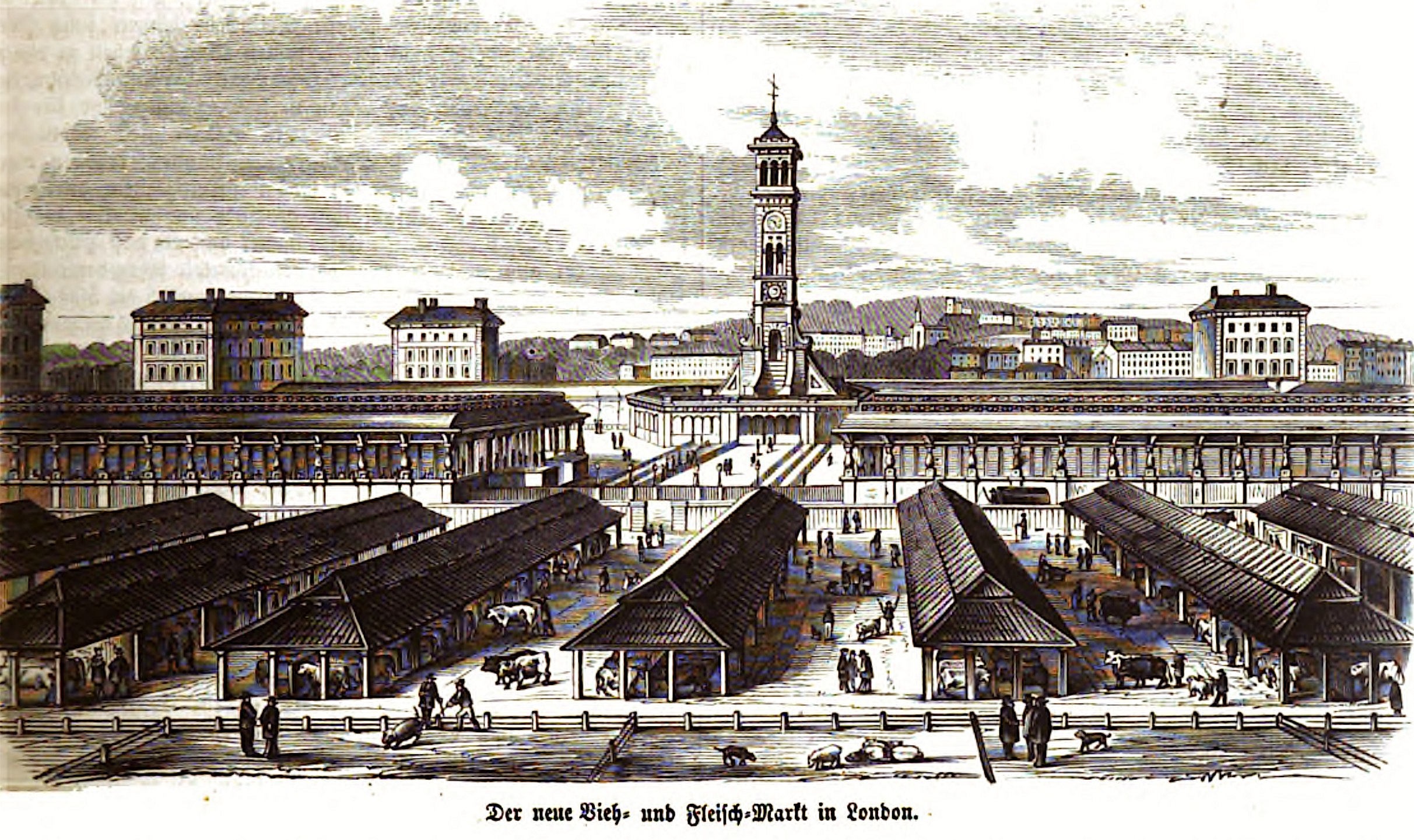
Metropolitan Cattle Market, Islington (1855), London's first great livestock market

For live cattle, the new Metropolitan Cattle Market was in Copenhagen Fields, Islington.

A growing population and increasing money wages created a demand for more meat. The British farming industry, protected from competition, could not satisfy the demand. In 1842-6 the Conservative government of Sir Robert Peel—as in its repeal of the Corn Laws—had legislated to allow all foreign cattle to be imported duty free. It was the beginning of the free trade era ("the first globalisation").

By railway the Metropolitan Cattle Market received livestock not only from most parts of Great Britain and Ireland, but increasingly from the Continent. John Gamgee, a veterinary scientist, warned that free trade in animals was dangerous because it would import diseases—had already done so. But the commercial interests were too powerful, and the trade continued.

As European rail links improved, live cattle came from as far away as the plains of Hungary and, eventually, Russia. That country had never been free from cattle plague (rinderpest), an infectious disease highly mortal to immunologically naïve cattle. It got into the Metropolitan Cattle Market and rapidly spread to most parts of Great Britain.

=== The 1865 cattle plague: need for a second, quarantine market ===
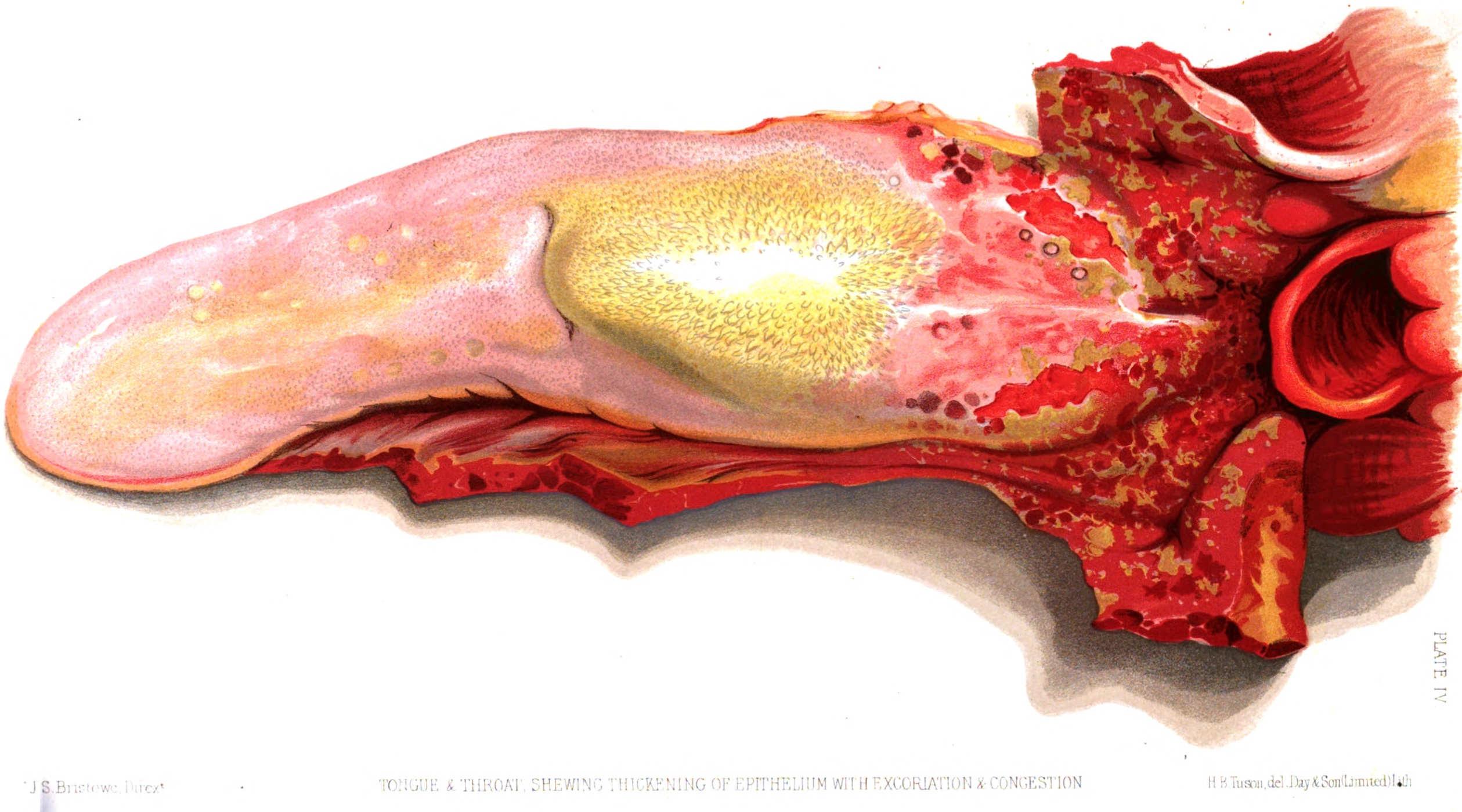
Cattle plague: post mortem drawing of tongue and throat, 1865 (an early instance of colour printing)

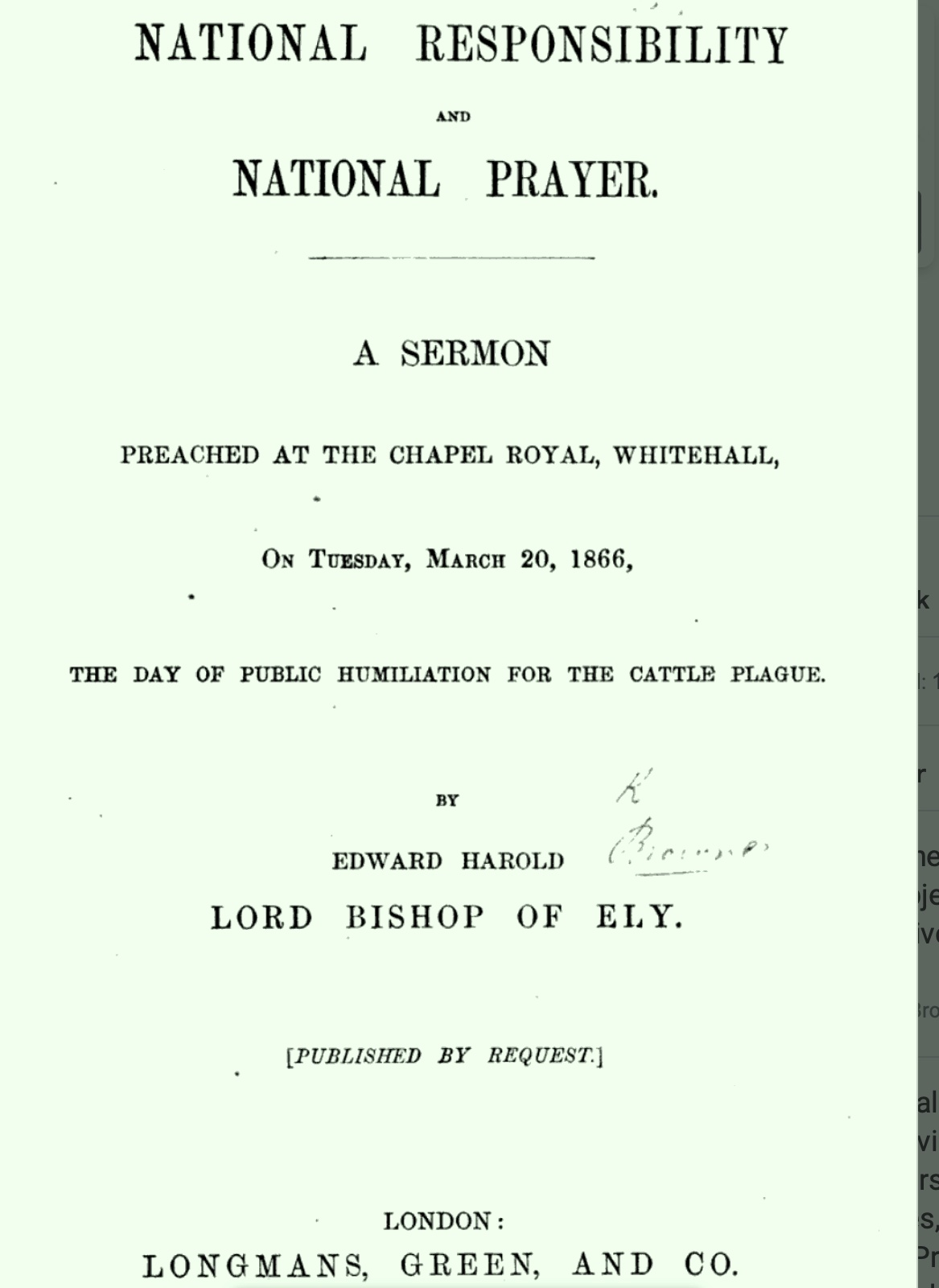
Sermon for the day of public humiliation

The cattle plague epidemic of 1865-7 has been described as the most dramatic event in 19th century agricultural history. Believing it to be a divine retribution for the sins of society, the Archbishop of Canterbury demanded a day of national humiliation.

Little was known about rinderpest in Great Britain and it took two years to eradicate. It did not help that the germ theory of disease had yet to be established. Quarantines and the mass slaughter of infected herds led to agitation against the foreign cattle trade.

Wrote Charles Dickens:

All the evidence points to one short, simple, certain, severe and somewhat costly remedy—a market exclusively reserved for foreign fat cattle at every port of debarkation, where every animal intended for the butcher should be slain, after sale, in abbatoirs provided for the purpose.

New laws followed. The Contagious Diseases (Animals) Act 1869 (32 & 33 Vict. c. 70) encouraged the City of London to open and run a second metropolitan livestock market exclusively for imported animals, to be known as the Foreign Cattle Market. It was appreciated that, not only rinderpest, but pleuro-pneumonia and foot-and-mouth disease were contagious threats.

Unless convinced that a foreign country was disease-free, the Privy Council (later, the Board of Agriculture) was authorised to "schedule" it, which meant put it on a greylist. Animals from that country, while not banned outright, must be landed at this new market, and nowhere else. It was to operate under quarantine conditions, and no animal was to leave it alive, but had to be slaughtered within 10 days.

== The Foreign Cattle Market: location, design and opening ==
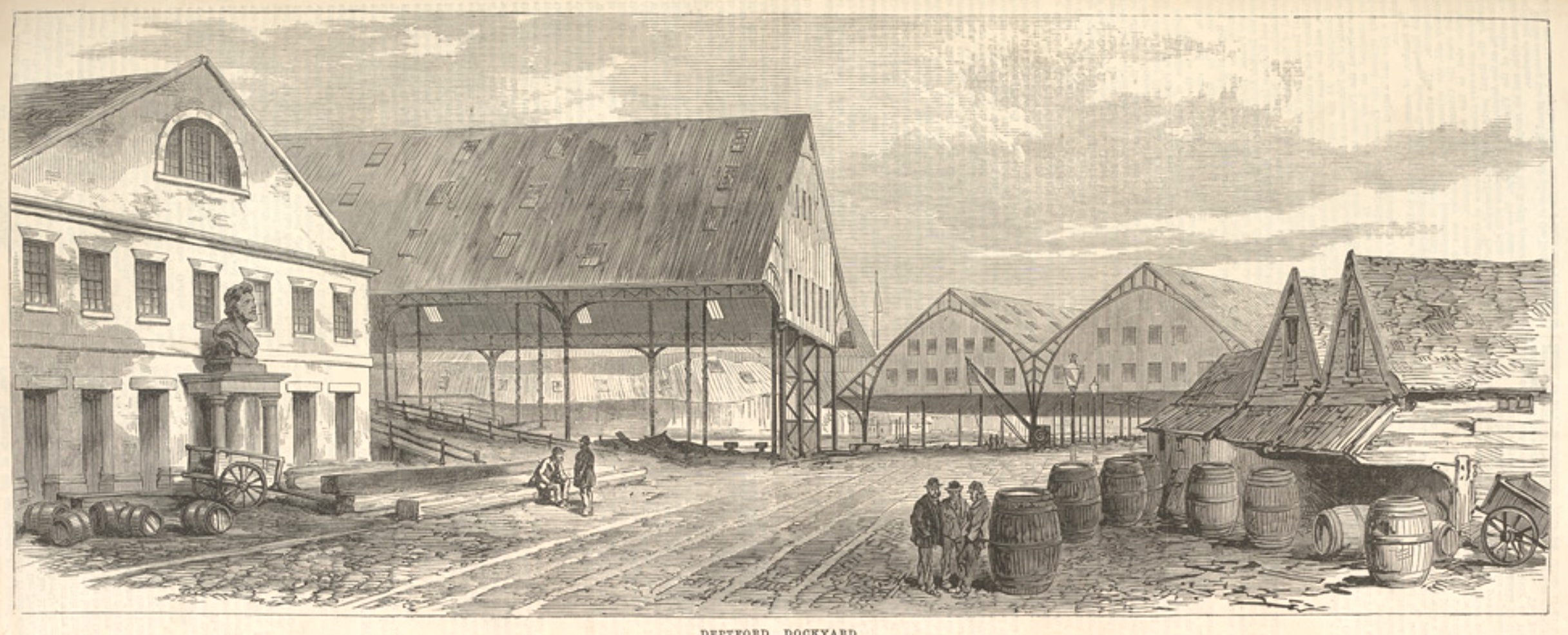
The site: the defunct Deptford Dockyard, 1869. To left, bust of its most famous pupil, Tsar Peter I of Russia. (British Library)

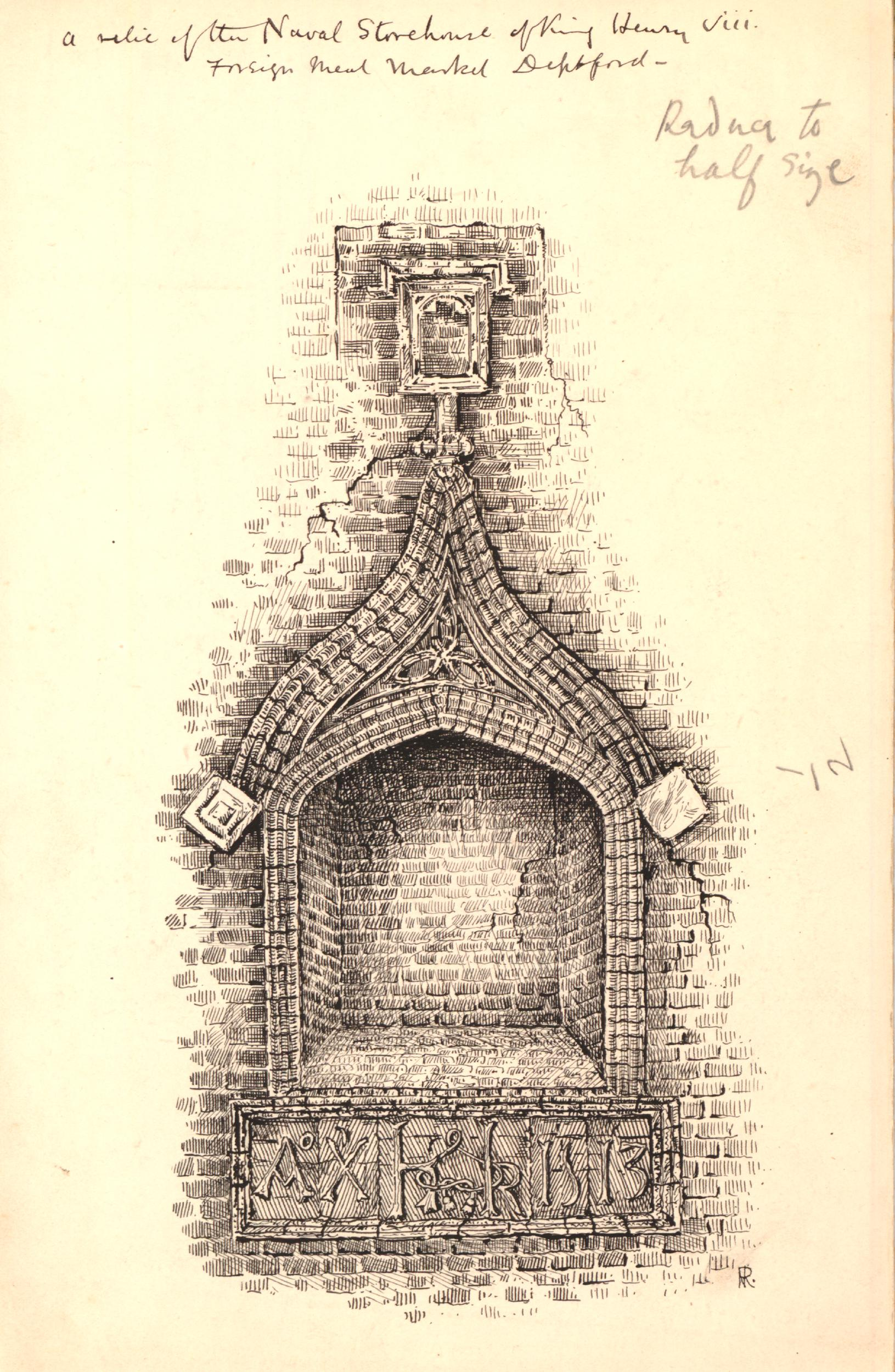
Henry VIII fireplace preserved at Deptford Cattle Market (British Museum)

Since the new market must be in a port, a suitable site on the Thames had to be chosen. There was lobbying for the market to be on the river's north bank, since many traders, especially the butchers of Whitechapel, did not want to have to travel to south London to buy their meat; but there were few adequate sites and access to these was poor. Eventually the defunct royal dockyard at Deptford was chosen. Here in times past Elizabeth I had come to knight Francis Drake aboard the Golden Hind, and Peter the Great of Russia had studied shipbuilding.

The Deptford site comprised 22 acres (8.9 ha) (afterwards increased to 30 acres (12 ha), bigger than Les Halles in Paris) and had a river frontage of 1,012 feet (308 m). It was situated on a bend in the Thames, at the bottom of Limehouse Reach. It was designed to receive up to three cattle boats at once, which might conceivably arrive at any time, day or night. Hence three large, immensely strong, timber piers were constructed for disembarking cattle. Piers were provided with platforms at two levels, so that animals could be discharged no matter what the state of the tide. At low tides the water depth was at least 12 feet (3.7 m), thought to be sufficient for most steamers. These piers still stand today, though they have been interconnected.

The architect was Sir Horace Jones, designer of Smithfield Market and Tower Bridge. Since time was short, Jones took a minimalist approach. The site was not cleared: the existing dockyard buildings were preserved and adapted as necessary. The dockyard had a tidal basin surrounded by three ship-building sheds, each as lofty as Charing Cross station (see title image). By connecting these together Jones obtained a cattle lairage building comprising a pentagonal horseshoe with open sides facing the river and the landing piers (see Layout). To the east another lairage shed had its own pier. Animals were provided with water troughs and hay racks, and the lairs were brilliantly lighted at night by gas lamps. There was enough covered accommodation for 5,000 cattle and 14,000 sheep. Later it was enlarged, and could accommodate 8,500 cattle and 20,000 sheep. Admiralty storehouses were converted into abattoirs, comprising some 70 slaughterhouses.

The demise of the old naval dockyard was regretted by many, and some features dating to Henry VIII were preserved. By order of the City officials, a board was put up bearing the following inscription: "Here worked as a ship-carpenter Peter, Czar of all the Russias, afterwards Peter the Great, 1698."

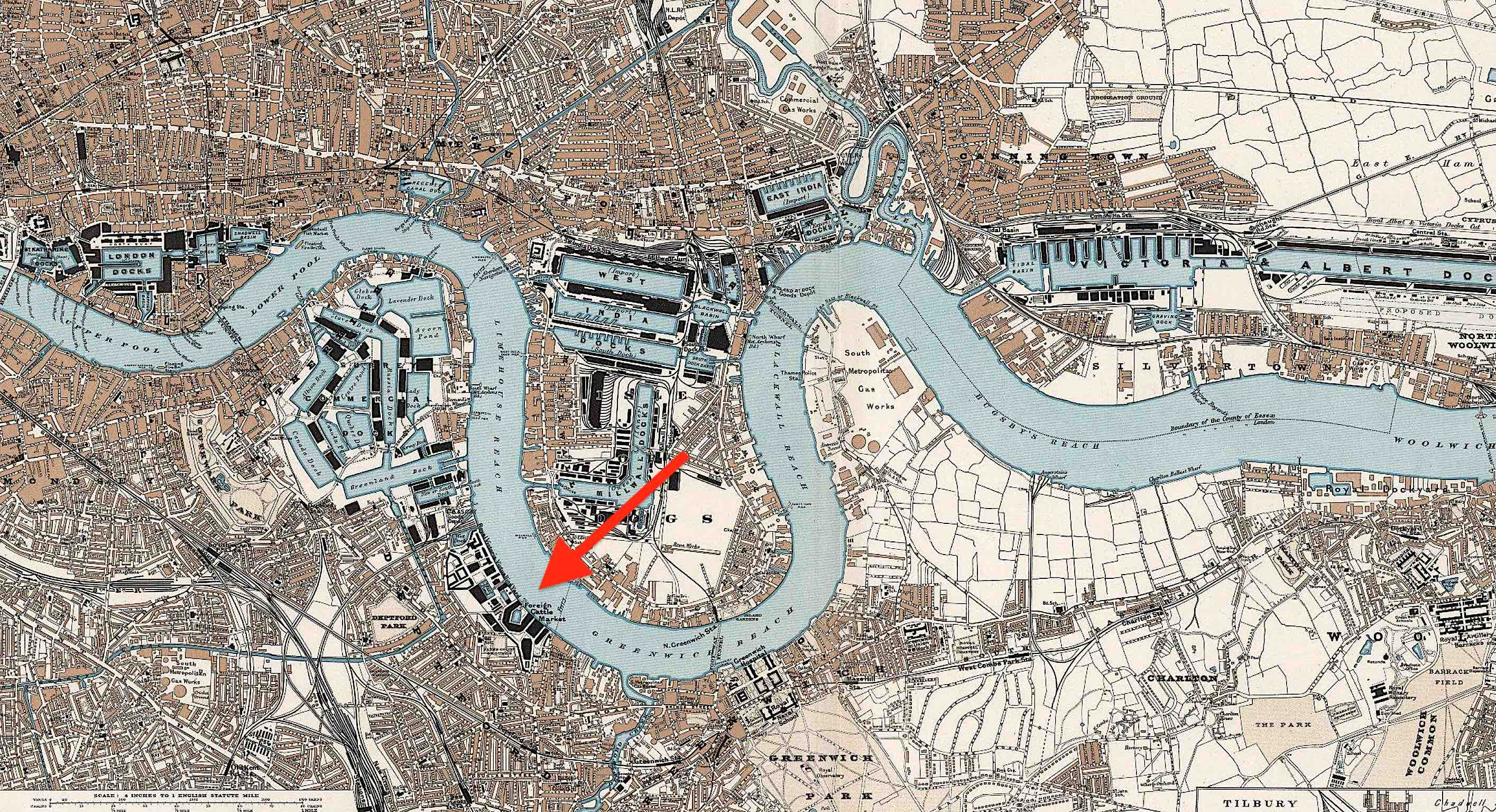
Location

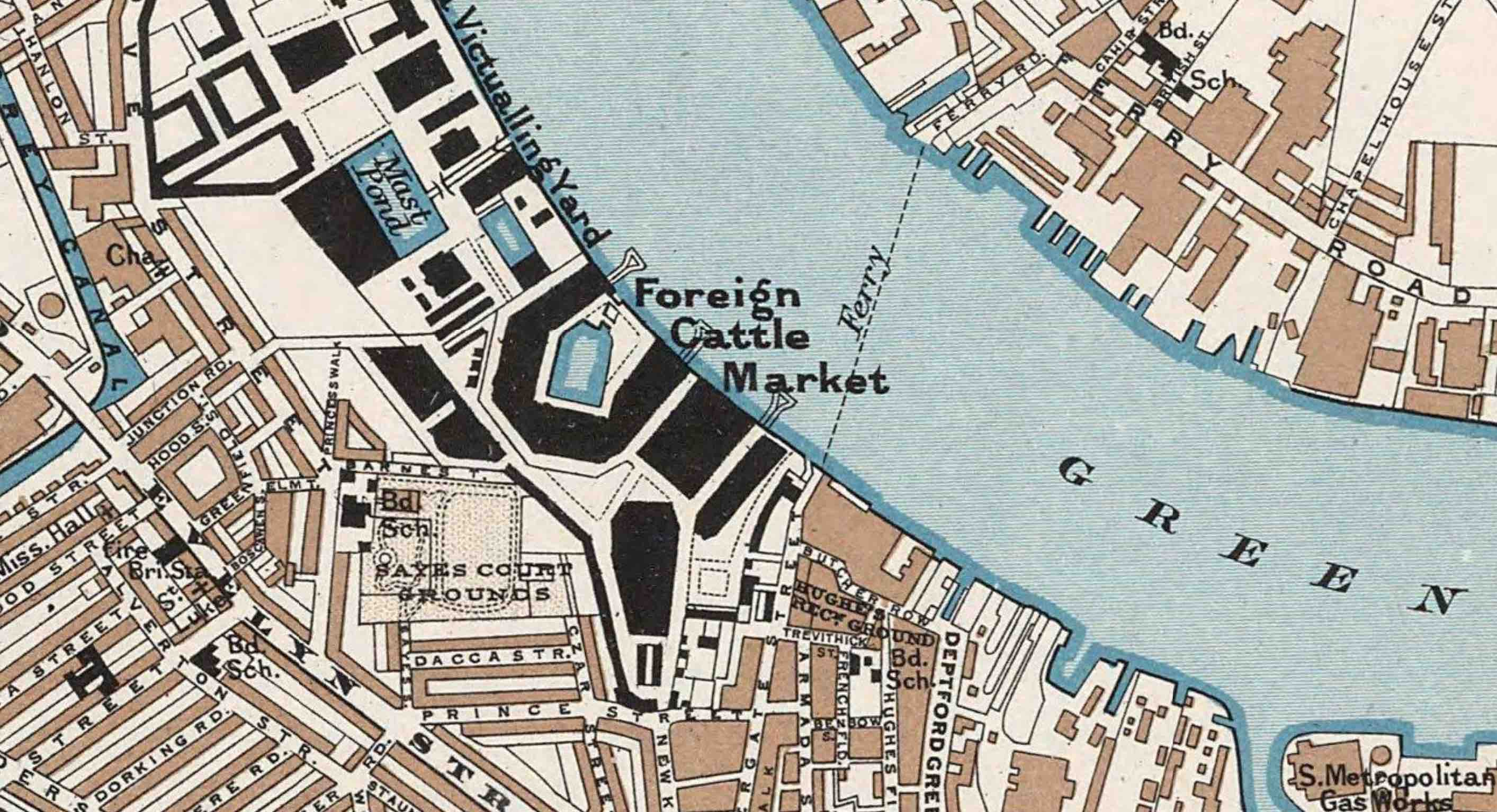
Layout

The market was opened for business in January 1872. In 1871 nearly half of cattle and sheep imported into the UK had been sold live at Islington, but by 1880 most were slaughtered at Deptford.

=== Adoption of refrigeration ===
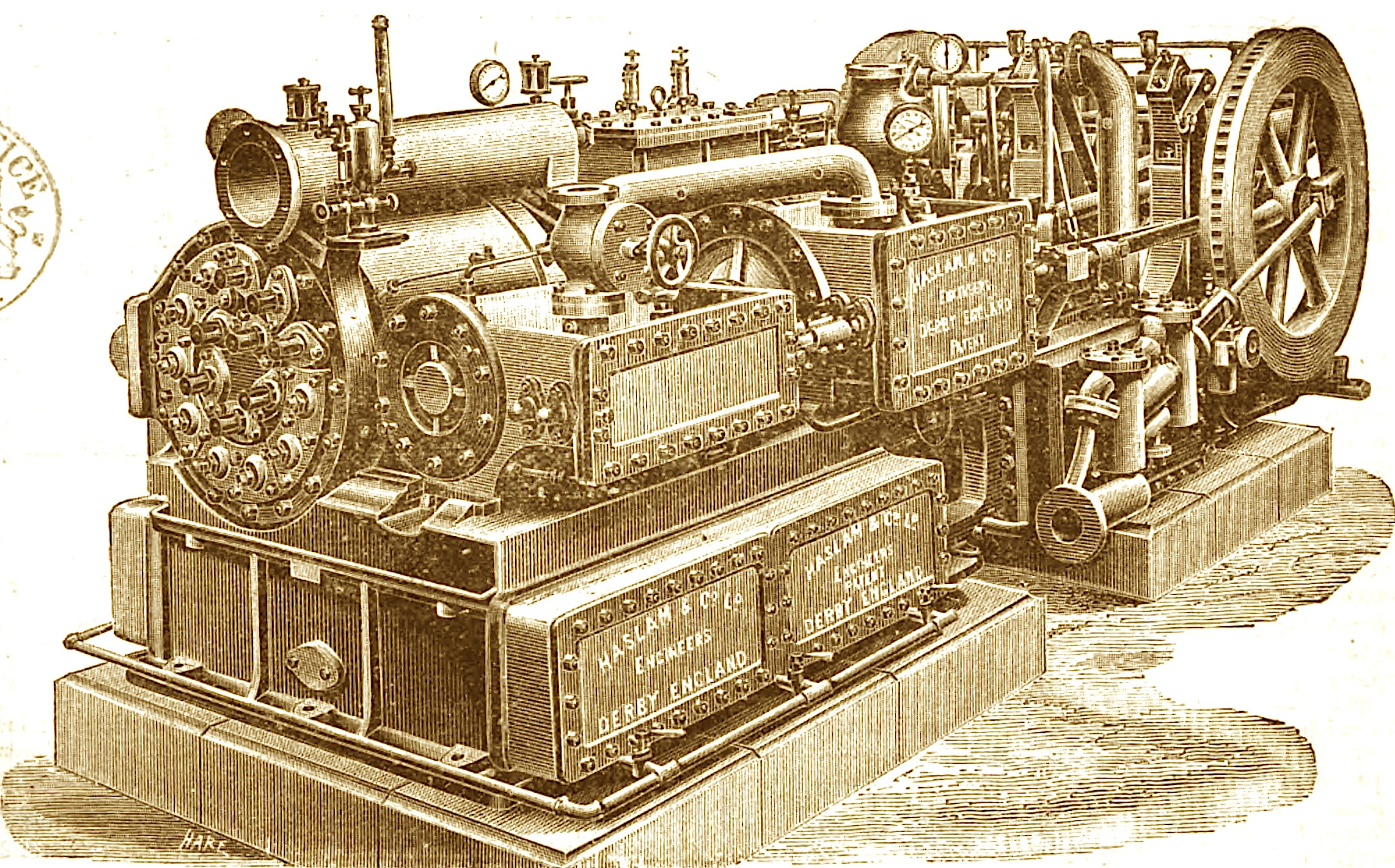
Haslam of Derby's refrigerating machinery at Deptford Market, 1889

That animals had to be slaughtered within a few days of landing, posed a challenge. Their meat would not keep — especially in hot weather — and had to be sold quickly, even at sacrificial prices if the market should happen to be over-supplied. Domestic farmers could avoid the loss by keeping their cattle back. It was not an option for foreign cattle traders, and it made their business risky.

Accordingly, the City decided freshly killed meat should be chilled; the first plant was inaugurated in July 1889. A refrigeration machine, made by Alfred Seale Haslam of Derby, drove dry, very cold air through a series of chilling rooms. Carcases on hooks were conveyed to these rooms directly from the slaughterhouses on overhead rails. Each room could hold 125 sides of beef. In less than 24 hours the warm carcases were chilled to slightly above freezing point. The dryness of the air removed surface moisture.

It is now known that, not only the chilling, but the drying of meat surfaces inhibits the growth of micro-organisms (though excessive drying does reduce yields and make for an unsightly product).

== Market life ==
The market was surrounded by a high boundary wall. Services inside included bank branches, a postal telegraph office, and the market's own pub, the Peter the Great.

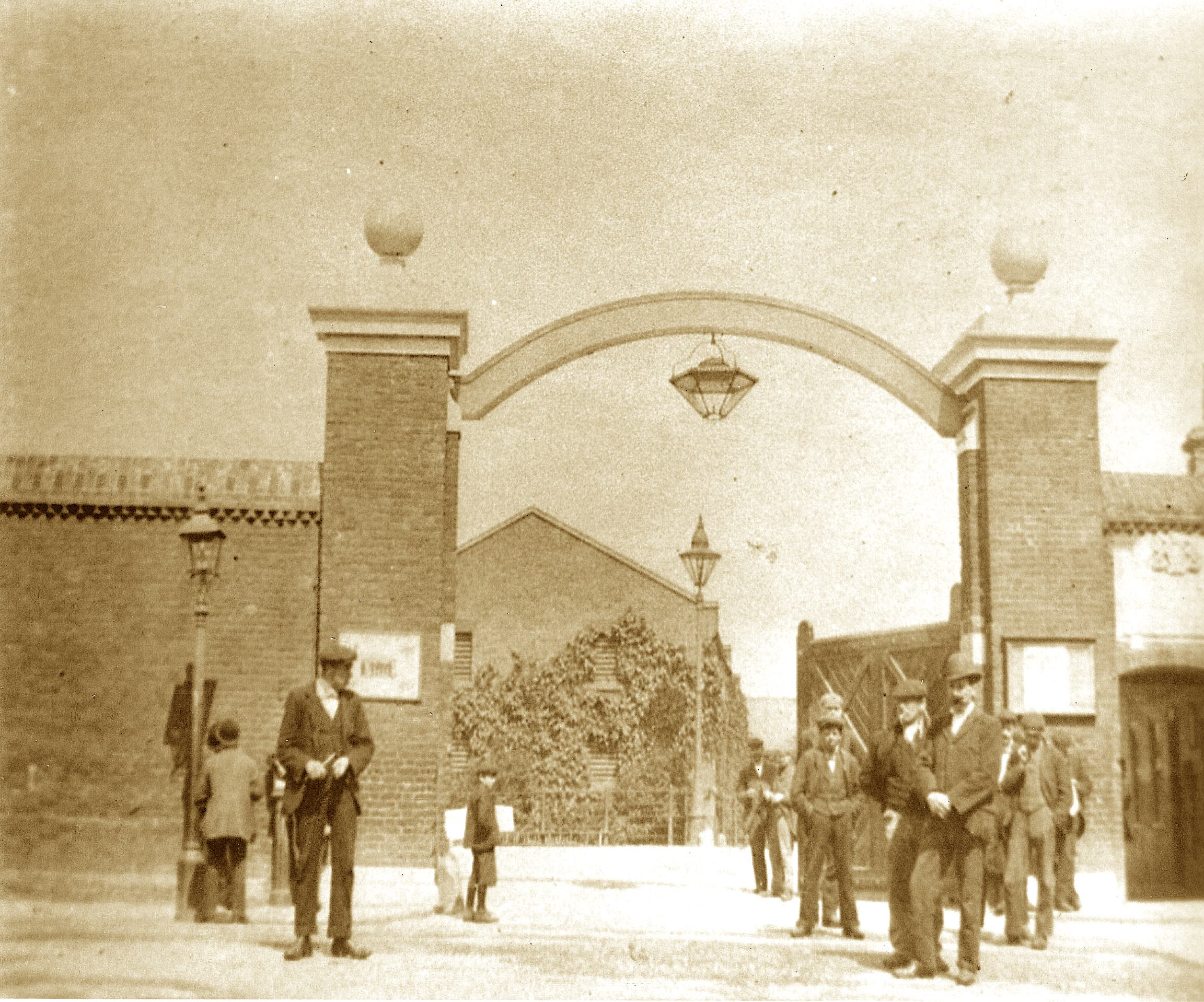
The main gate, Foreign Cattle Market, Deptford

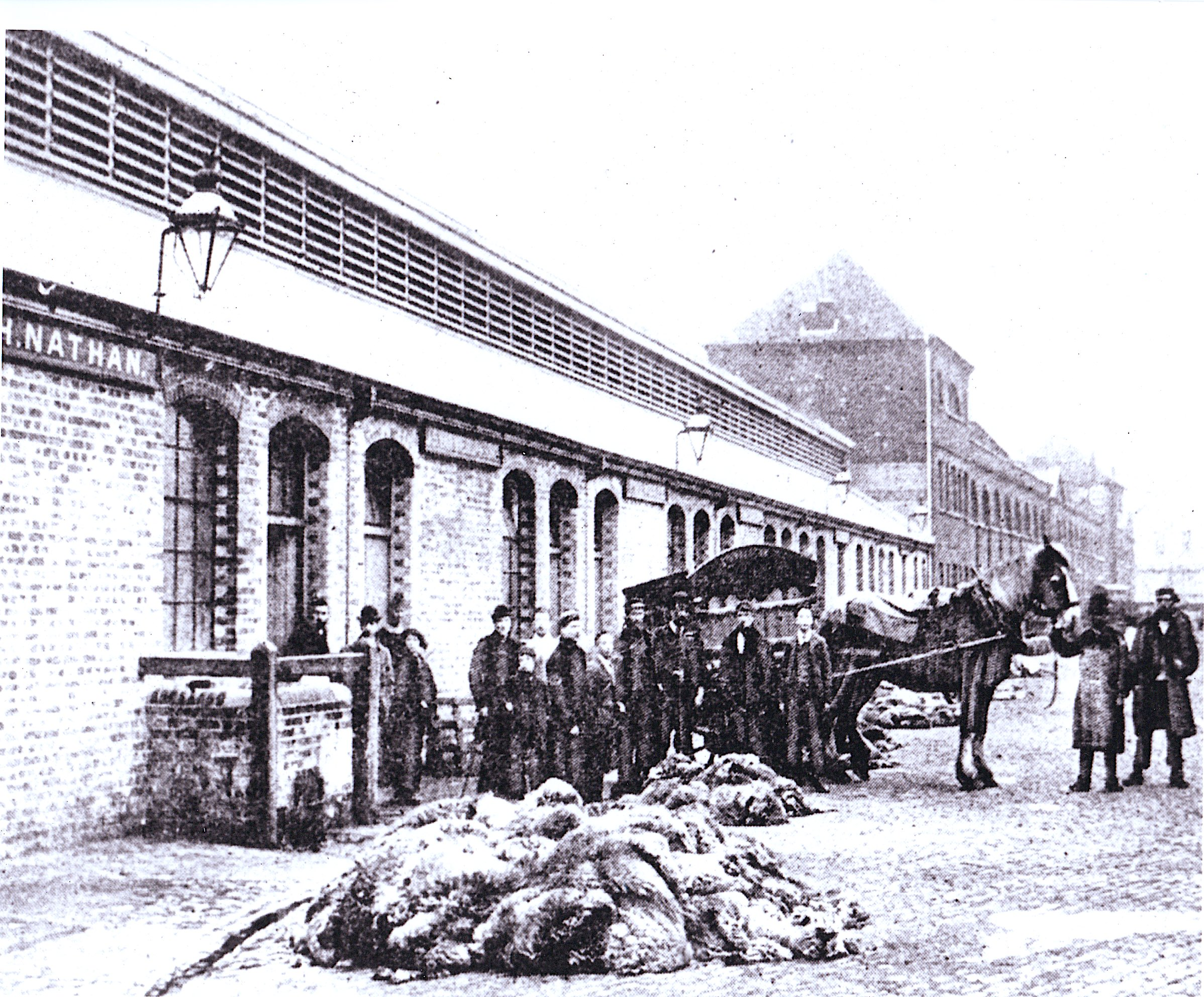
Sheepskins had to be disinfected before leaving

=== Trading ===
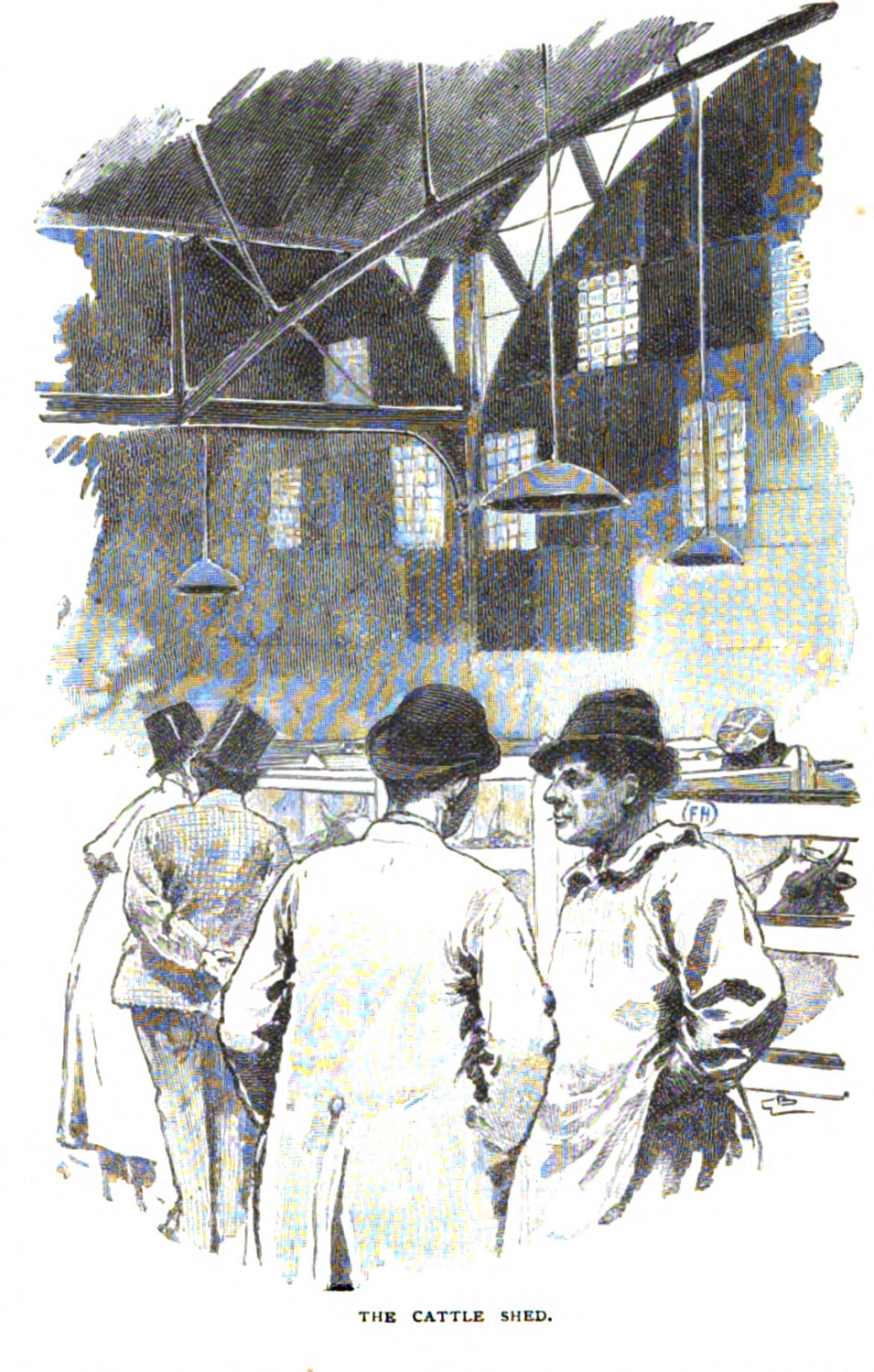
Traders in the cattle shed, Deptford

It was not an auction market. Trading was by private bargain, and in live animals only. Exporters consigned cattle, sheep and pigs to salesmen who worked on commission. Salesmen and buyers intermingled around the animal pens. Market days were Mondays and Thursdays, but there was nothing to stop animals being sold in their lairs on other days, and this was often done, especially when a shipload arrived late.

Weighbridges were seldom used: it was a matter of professional pride that cattle weights were guesstimated. A journalist described it for Australian readers:

The buyer runs over the lot, say, twenty or fifty, averaging the weights by calculation, and then offers a price, which is of course contemptuously rejected at first. By a gradual process of approximation the difficulty is got over, and a shake of the hand, or other mysterious sign, indicates the purchase of £1000 worth of beef.

The buyers were wholesale (and sometimes retail) butchers, who had access to slaughterhouse space on the premises, generally renting it by the year. Slaughtermen, paid by results, killed and butchered their purchases for them within the 10 days required by law; the buyers took away the meat, offal, hides and fleeces: most of the meat they resold at Smithfield. By the end of 1887 some 9.4 million animals had been landed at Deptford.

==== Statistics ====
The volume of trade fluctuated considerably, but from modest beginnings in 1872 it increased until, by about 1890, more (foreign) cattle were sent to Deptford than (British) to Islington. By 1907, according to the Westminster Gazette 78% of London's live cattle trade went to Deptford. The largest number of cattle ever landed in one year was 224,831 (1897); of sheep, 783,440 (1882). Detailed statistics are set out in tables in this note.

In the Edwardian era a combination of Chicago meatpackers took advantage of the loophole in the regulations — that animals need not be put up for sale on market days — to bypass the marketing system altogether. See The Beef Trust, below.

Altogether 16.5 million animals were slaughtered at Deptford.

=== Cattle boats ===
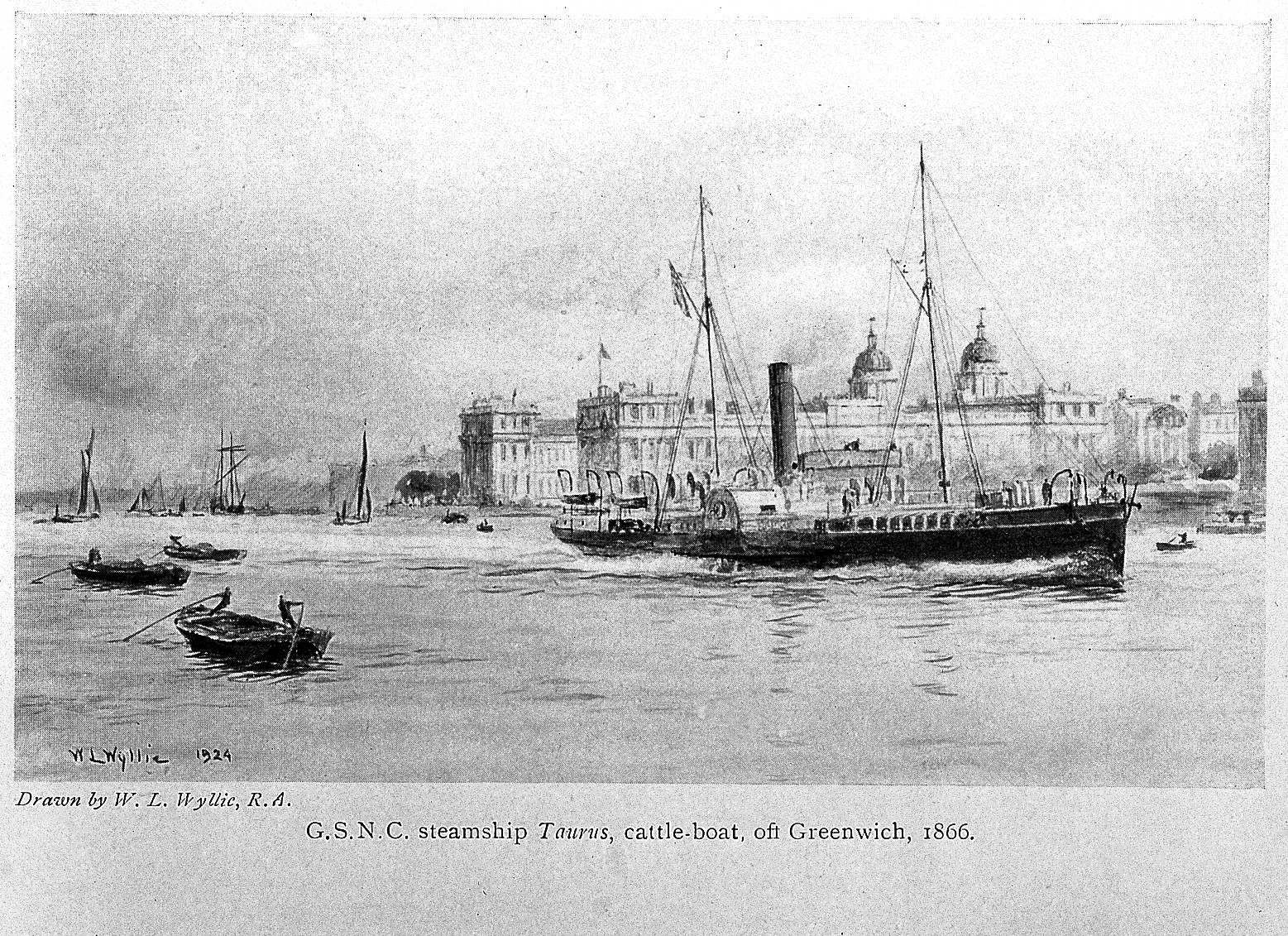
Taurus, one of three cattle ferry boats owned by Deptford Market

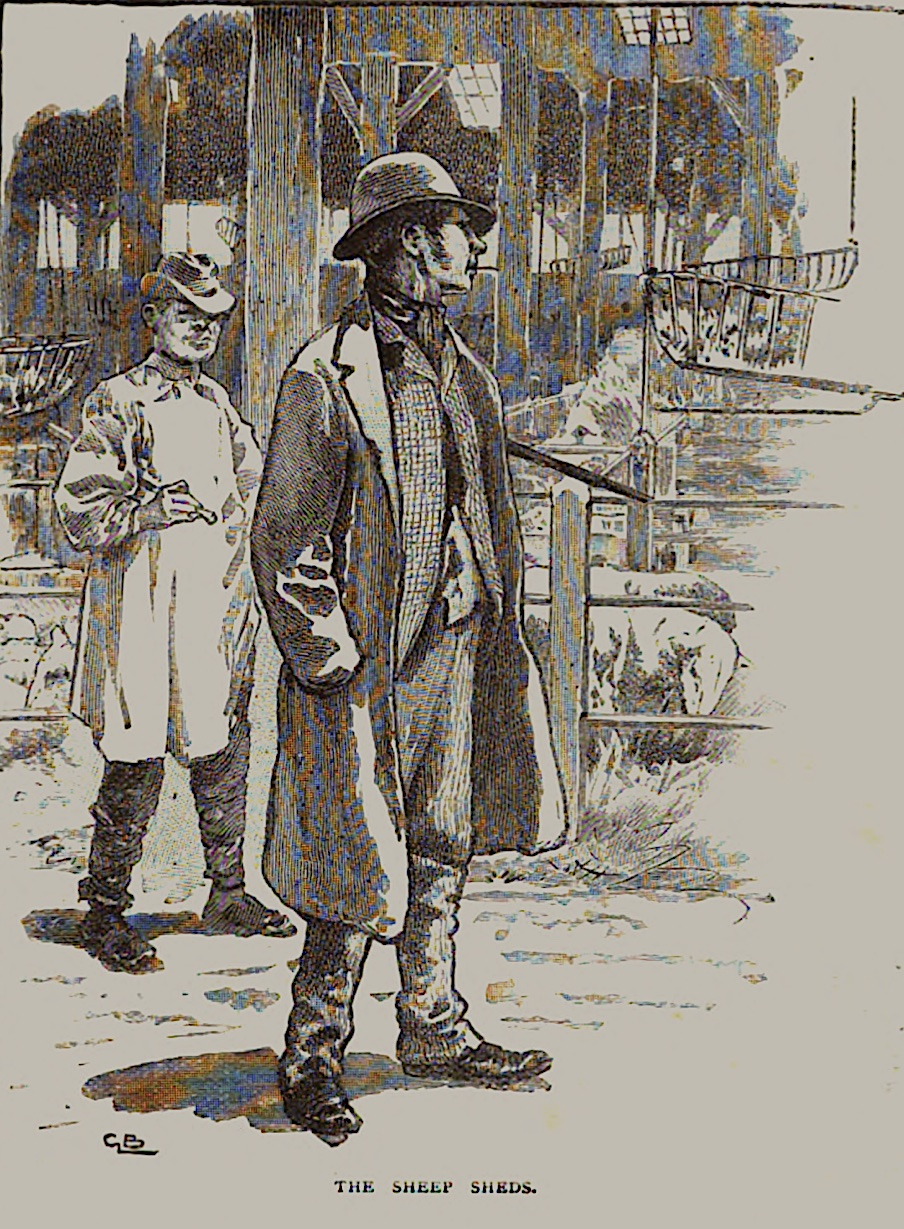
Traders in the sheep shed, Deptford

Cattle boats from the Continent — over a thousand a year — came up the Thames on Sundays and Wednesdays.

As the transatlantic cattle trade developed (see below), large ocean-going cattle steamers came into use, but these were reluctant to come alongside. Accordingly the market purchased three paddle steamers (named Racoon, Taurus and Claude Hamilton) into which cattle were transshipped at Gravesend. Between them, those vessels conveyed more than 1.6 million animals to Deptford.

==== Jack the Ripper, Deptford cattle boat man ====
One of the many theories about Jack the Ripper was that he was a Portuguese cattle attendant on a boat from Porto. When it docked at Deptford, a Whitechapel murder ensued, or so insisted a customs official who claimed to see a statistical correlation. His persistence irritated the police, but his theory was noticed by Queen Victoria. "The Queen fears the Detective Department is not as efficient as it might be... Have the cattle boats & passenger boats been examined?"

=== Veterinary ===
On landing, animals were examined by a veterinary surgeon who took their pulse and temperature. Suspects were set aside for observation. If one animal in a cargo was found to be contagious, it was slaughtered at once and its carcase sterilised by steam in an iron digester; its companions were put with the suspects. Drovers wore protective clothing, afterwards disinfected in a sulphur chamber. Hides, horns, fleeces and offal were also disinfected; manure and litter were sterilised. A correspondent from The Times thought the market was very clean and by the standards of the day animals were slaughtered humanely.

Foreign veterinarians observed for their governments. American cattle bore ear tags and, if one was found to be diseased, the American vet would telegraph the serial number to his government: the animal's home farm could be traced within hours and a quarantine imposed if necessary. The Argentine government sent a vet too, in 1903.

The quarantine rules could minimise, but could not altogether prevent, the importation of contagious diseases. The government accepted that cattle plague (1877) and foot-and-mouth disease (1880 and 1882) had escaped from Deptford market.

==== Strict quarantine ====
Besides cattle, sheep and pigs, there was a small trade in horses and donkeys. The rule that no animal could leave the market alive was strictly enforced. A country bumpkin from Essex brought a complaint before magistrate Montagu Williams. The Essex man, needing a good steed, had been induced by a glowing advertisement to pay £30 for a horse, viewable at Deptford Market. He did not realise it was in no condition to be ridden away.

=== George Philcox ===
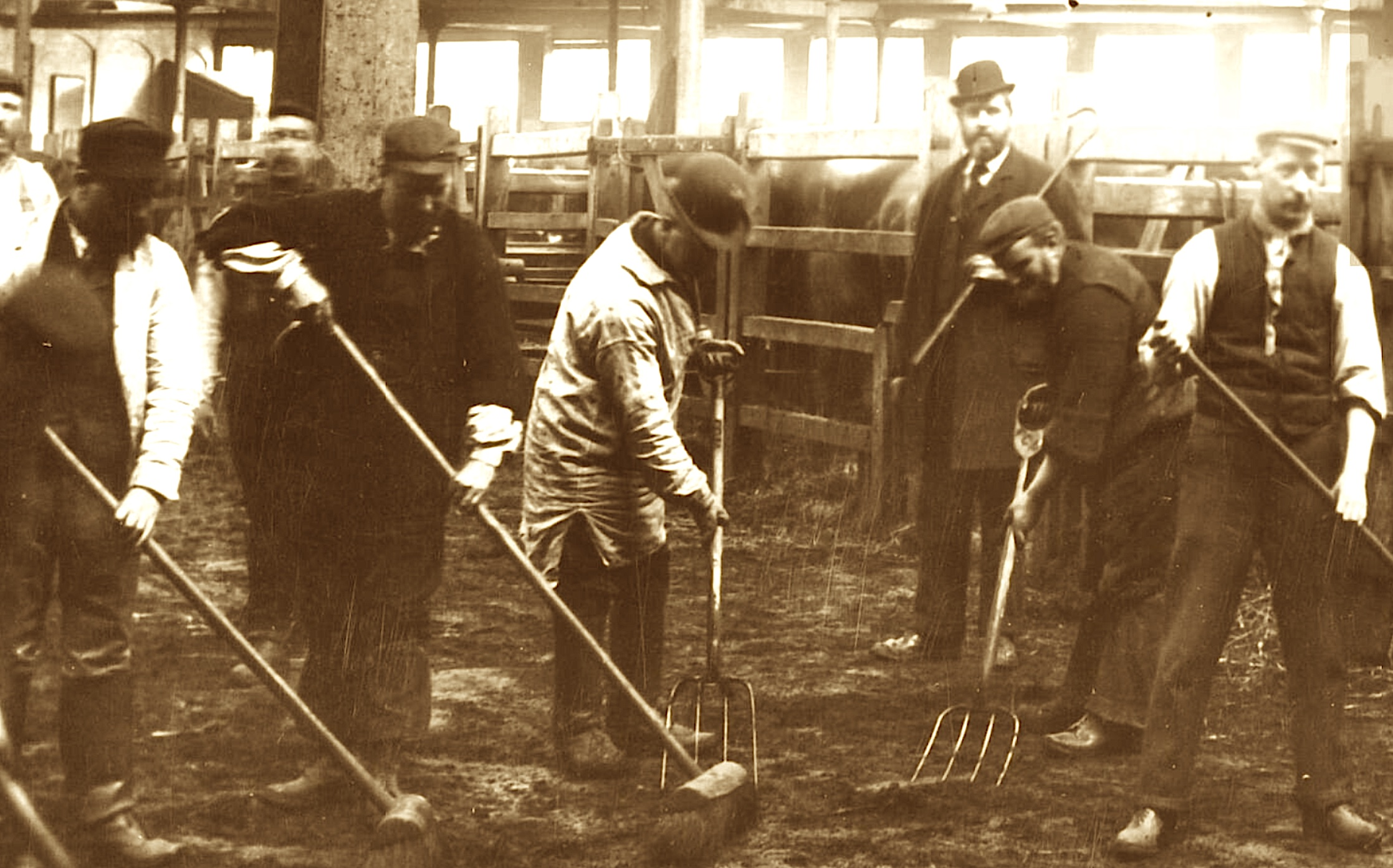
George Philcox, probably the man in the overcoat (London Picture Archive)

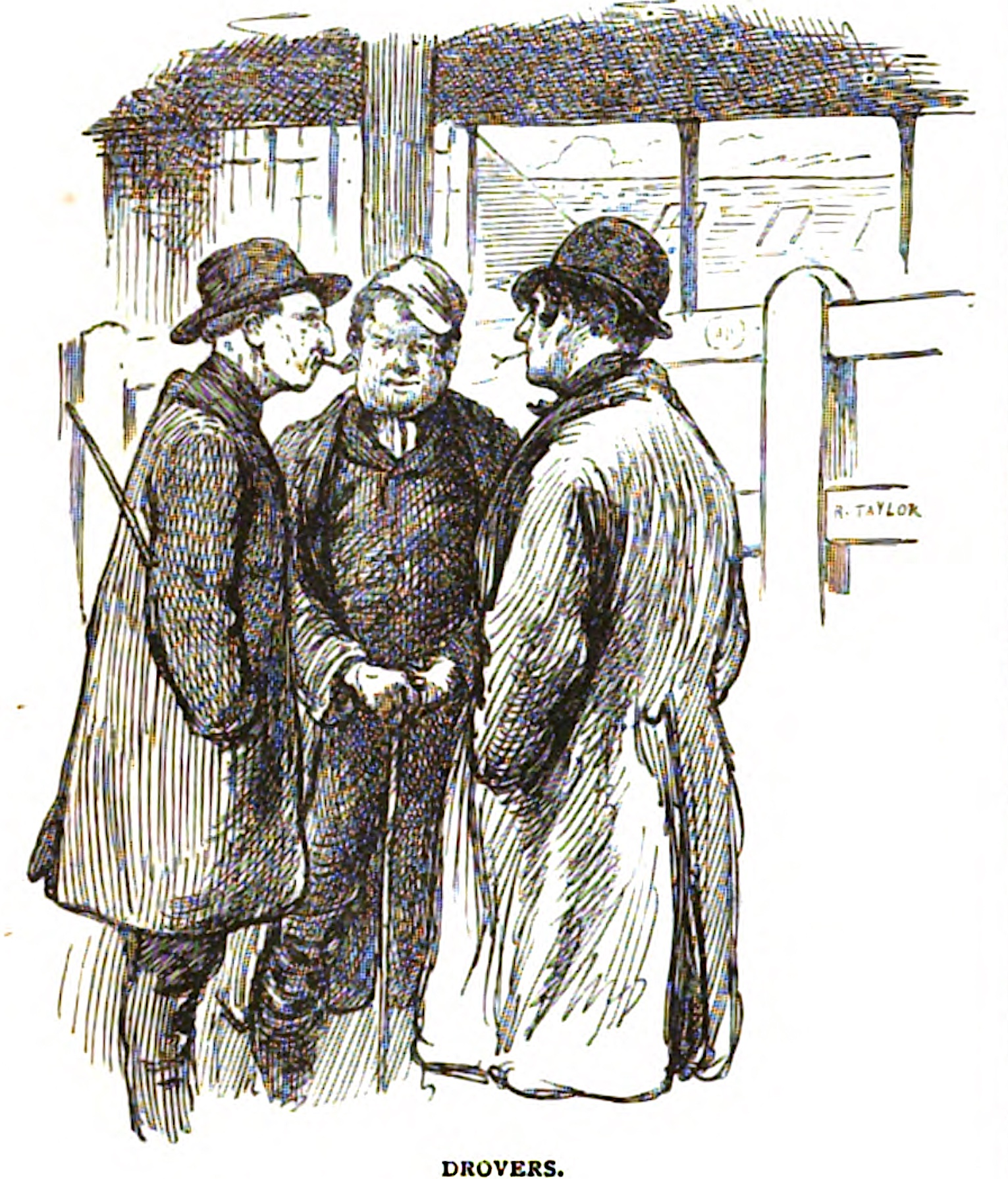
Drovers at the Deptford Cattle Market, 1889

To find a superintendent for the market the City interviewed 25 candidates, and chose a 28-year old Southend station-master, George Philcox. Philcox was in charge of the market for the next 40 years; when he died in 1912, it soon closed. Apparently an able and popular man, it was said "The market made him, and in turn he made it".

=== Employment conditions ===
Employment conditions in Deptford Foreign Cattle Market were investigated by social researcher Charles Booth and are described in his Life and Labour of the People in London (1896).

The market had about 110 direct employees. In addition 1500 casual workers, mostly drovers and slaughtermen, were paid on piecework, and at times could earn high wages, but the hours were irregular and employment was precarious. They were irregular because they depended on when ships arrived. It was precarious because the volume of trade was driven by the animal disease regulations, which kept changing. As was common in high-wage, insecure jobs that attracted improvident men, there was much insobriety, said Booth's researchers.

Unemployment at the market might cause severe hardship in Deptford, where it was already high because people migrated to the district to find work. There is a record of market workers sending a wreath to the funeral of George Joseph Cooper MP, admired because at one time Argentina was put on the blacklist and he had tried very hard to get it removed. In 1924, years after the market had closed, efforts were still being made to get it re-opened.

==== Drovers ====
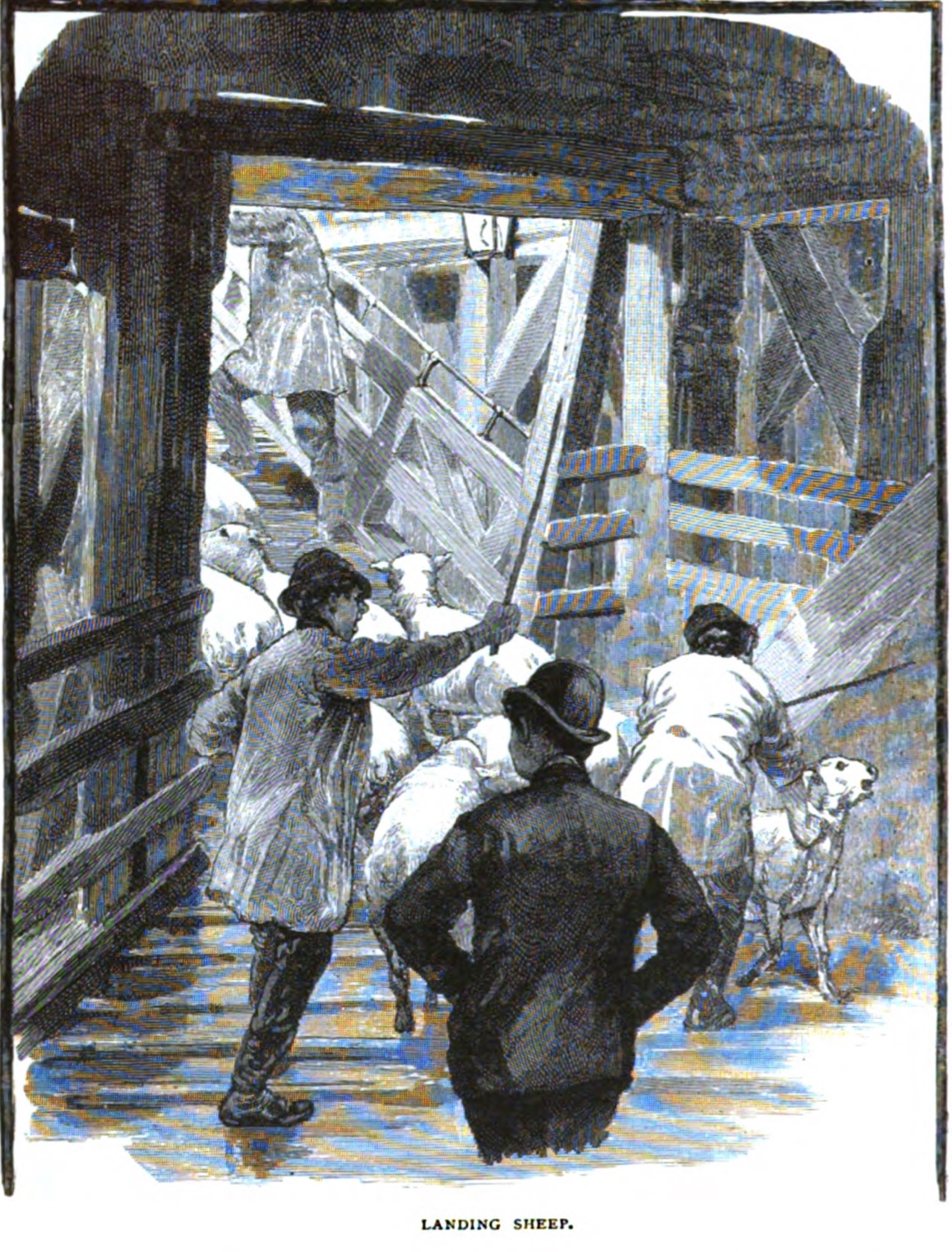
Drovers landing sheep at low tide

It was their job to drive the animals off the boats, or to transship them from the transatlantic steamers at Gravesend.

Nearly all the drovers begin their life in the market as "ochre boys", that is, boys who mark the animals with ochre for the butchers, and who are paid a few pence for so doing. When they get old enough, and begin to pick up the drover's craft, they apply to the City Corporation for a licence, which is granted on satisfactory proof of good character on the payment of a fee of 5s, and is annually renewable without further payment.

Drovers at Deptford market were paid a lump sum per vessel, George Philcox told Booth. They could unload a cattle boat in as little as 15 minutes. Some cattle, especially from Argentina, were very wild, and were best given "a wide berth". A man in regular employment could earn as much as £4 a week (about £520 purchasing power in 2018 money).

==== Slaughtermen ====
These men, who killed and butchered the animals, worked in gangs of four, and earned very high wages for the era: £5 (≅ £650_{2018}) a week was not uncommon. No slaughtering was done on Saturdays; on other days it varied according to demand, and for a rush order might last up to 20 hours on end. The work was said to be brutalising "and conducive to drink".

A carefully aimed blow at the head with a poleaxe was the usual method of stunning used in Britain. While The Times reported favourably on the relative humanity practised at Deptford, it came from the skill acquired by regular repetition; it was not infallible. A tanner, examining the lesions on a sample 100 cattle hides — albeit not from Deptford — noted that 45% showed signs of more than one blow i.e., they were not stunned by the first stroke. An advocate of the Jewish shechita method (which was also used at the market) said that he had observed that it often took five blows to fell an ox at Deptford.

That women slaughtered animals at Deptford is not supported by reliable sources.

==== Women: the gut girls ====
One of the most unpleasant jobs was cleaning cattle and sheep intestines, which were used for making sausage skins (and, according to a later source, condoms). Originally men's work, in about 1891 they went on strike for more pay: management responded by assigning the work to women.

Some 80-100 women and girls, aged 14 to 40, were employed daily; they worked for two firms that had contracted to buy all the gut offal from the market's slaughterhouses. Writing for the Daily Telegraph, "A Lady Visitor", who claimed to have smelled some vile odours in her time, said the stink was insupportable. Tubs of unwashed entrails were coarsely de-fatted by men.

The women's share in the ugly business begins when the greasy, slimy intestinal skins [many yards long] come to them for the scraping off of all fat and substance still attaching to them.

This work was done by a first group who cleaned off the outside, made the gut into a figure of eight rope, and tossed it to a second. The second group, armed with a powerful watercock, turned the gut inside out and washed it ready for the sausage makers. In winter the water nearly froze the hands.

They made 12s to 14s (≅ £77 to £89_{2018}) a week which, for women's work, was good pay.

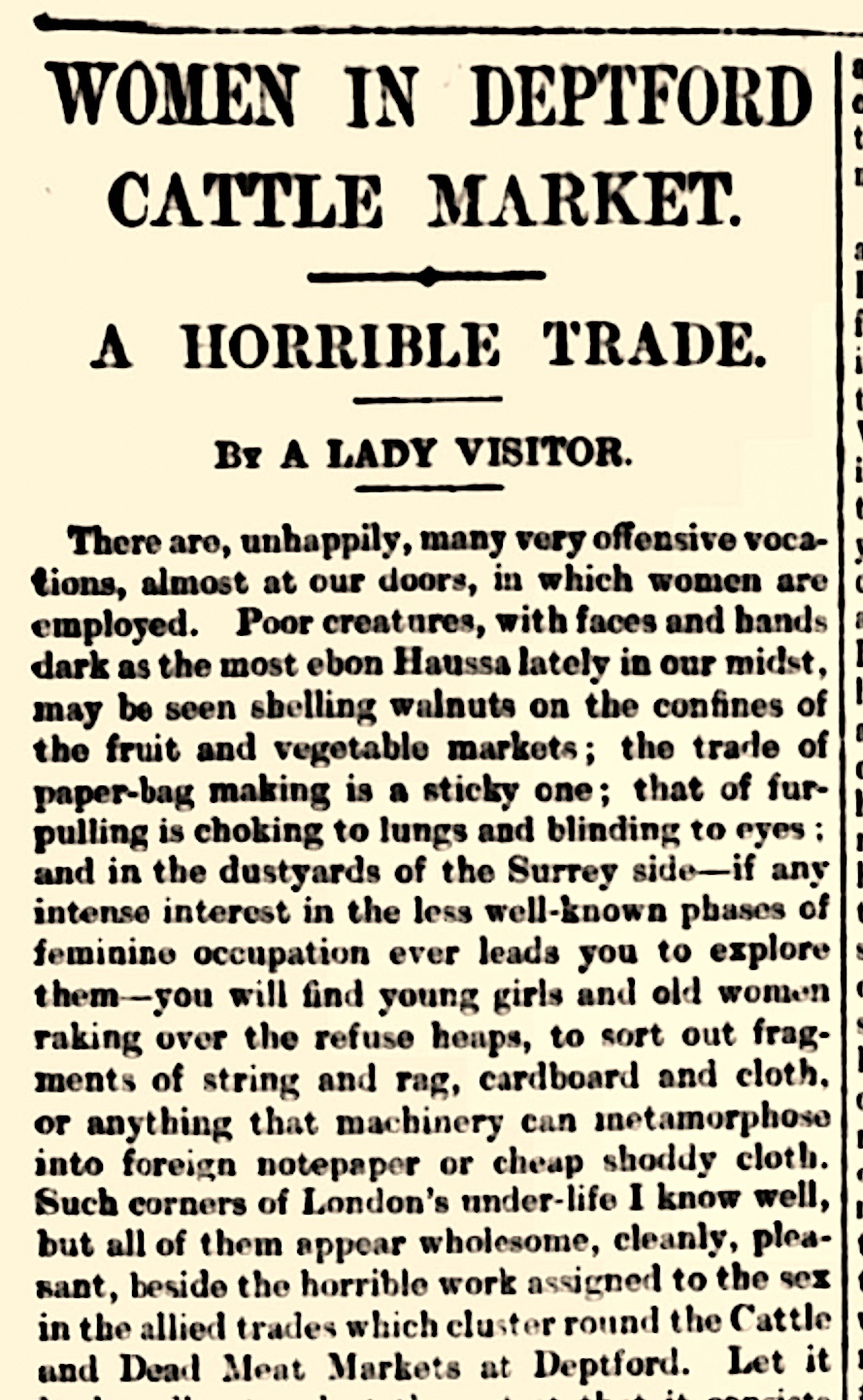
Daily Telegraph 19 July 1897

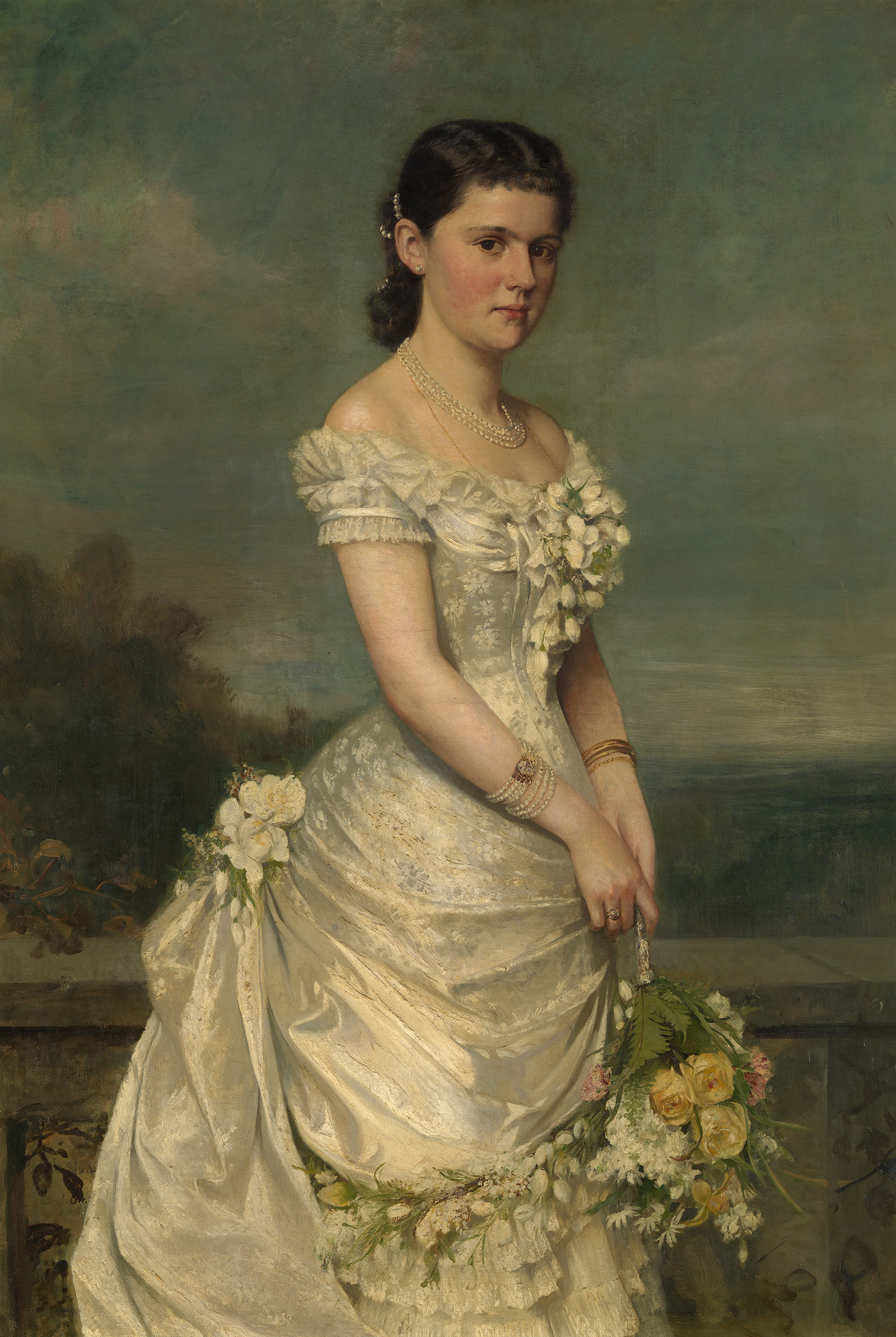
Duchess of Albany, patron of the Detford Fund

For some reason Queen Victoria took an interest in the Deptford market, and she asked her daughter-in-law, the Duchess of Albany, to look into the working conditions of the girls there. The Duchess of Albany went down to Deptford, saw the work, was horrified, and complained in high places. It turned out that the gut firms had been processing, not just the Deptford market entrails, but huge quantities brought in from outside. The City's markets committee, finding out, banned it as a health risk. The result was that the women became unemployed, and a charity, the Deptford Fund, had to be started to support them. The stage play The Gut Girls by Sarah Daniels is a fictionalised version of this incident.

Years later the Duchess of Albany's daughter (aged 95) told the BBC:

I never knew such cheerful people. They were very, very gay. Very unruly, terribly unruly, bad girls. If they came down dancing their can-can and you were in the way, you'd be swept off. They could be horrid.

Despite this, it appears that most women tried to conceal their employment at the market.

== Deptford as an international livestock market ==
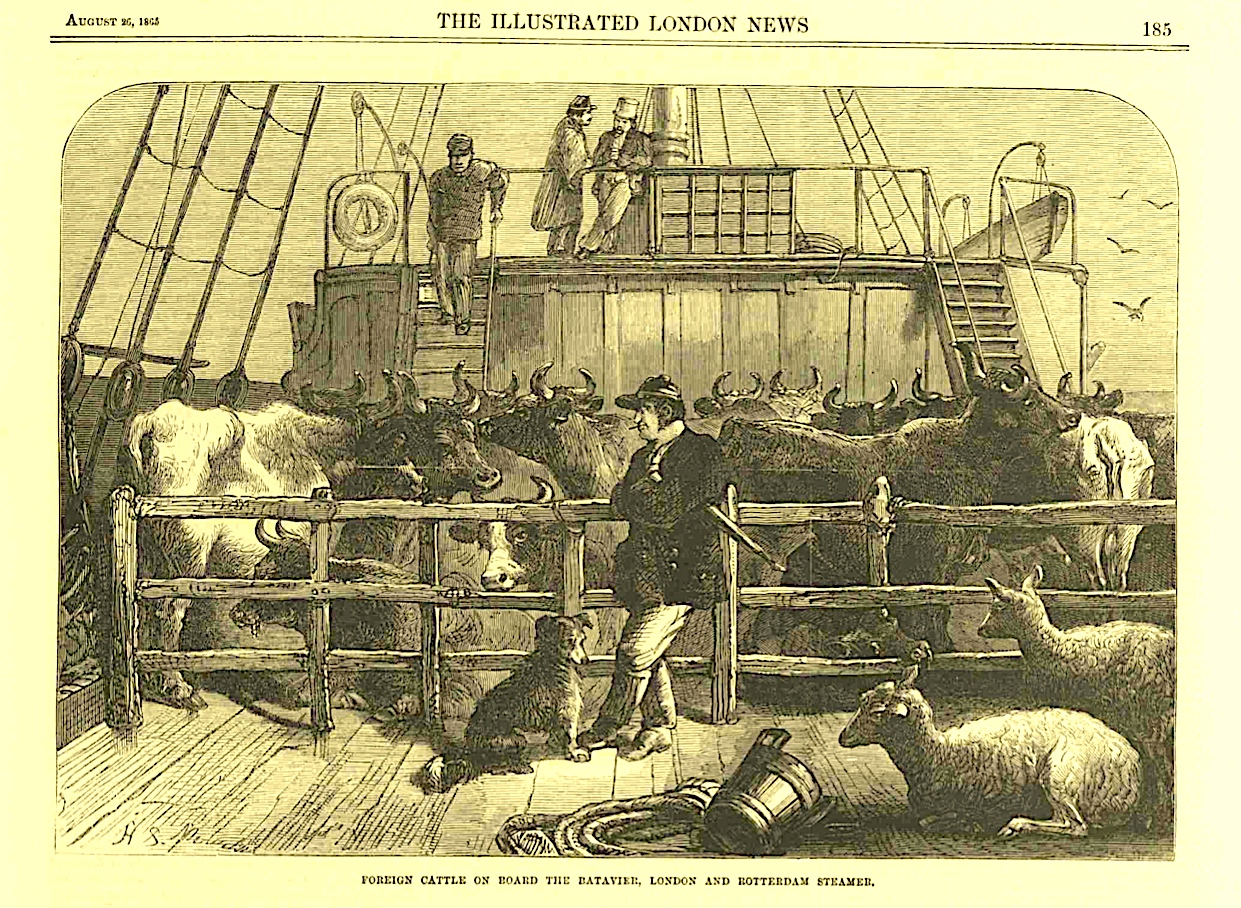
Early cattle boat. These small Dutch passenger steamers on the Rotterdam-London run carried a few cattle as a sideline.

Over the years roughly half of London's meat came from the Foreign Cattle Market. As a consumer of meat, the London of the era has been described as the greatest market in the world. "The British were beef hungry. They had the money to buy meat in any market, and as the great creditor nation they were at a distinct advantage in purchasing livestock in America and in the rest of the world". It was described as the first globalisation.

Hence Deptford market was much more than a set of buildings on the Thames. From it radiated a web of commercial relationships that went out to livestock producers in distant parts of the planet. For example a salesman at Deptford could be representing a cattle buyer in (say) Chicago, who might get his supplies from finishers in the American Cornbelt, who were supplied by Western ranchers, and so on.

=== From Europe ===
==== Early sources ====
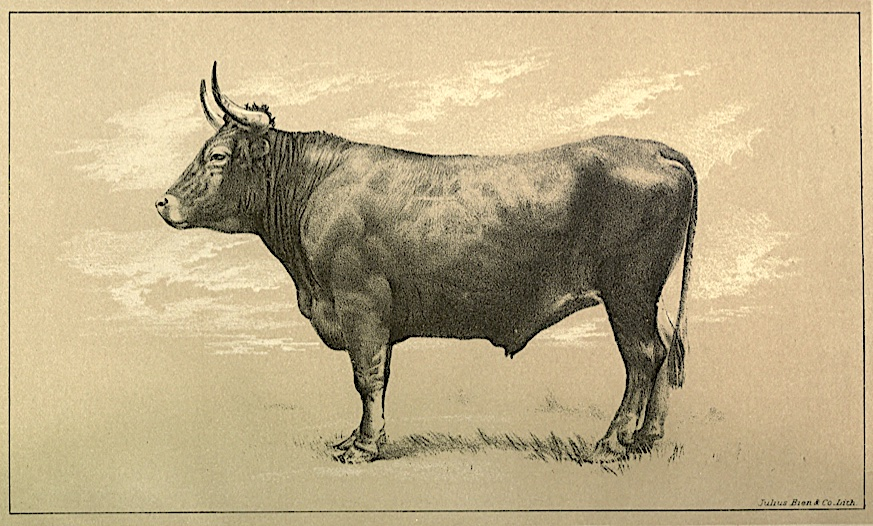
Spanish cattle. Galician ox, part of a cargo for England, 1884

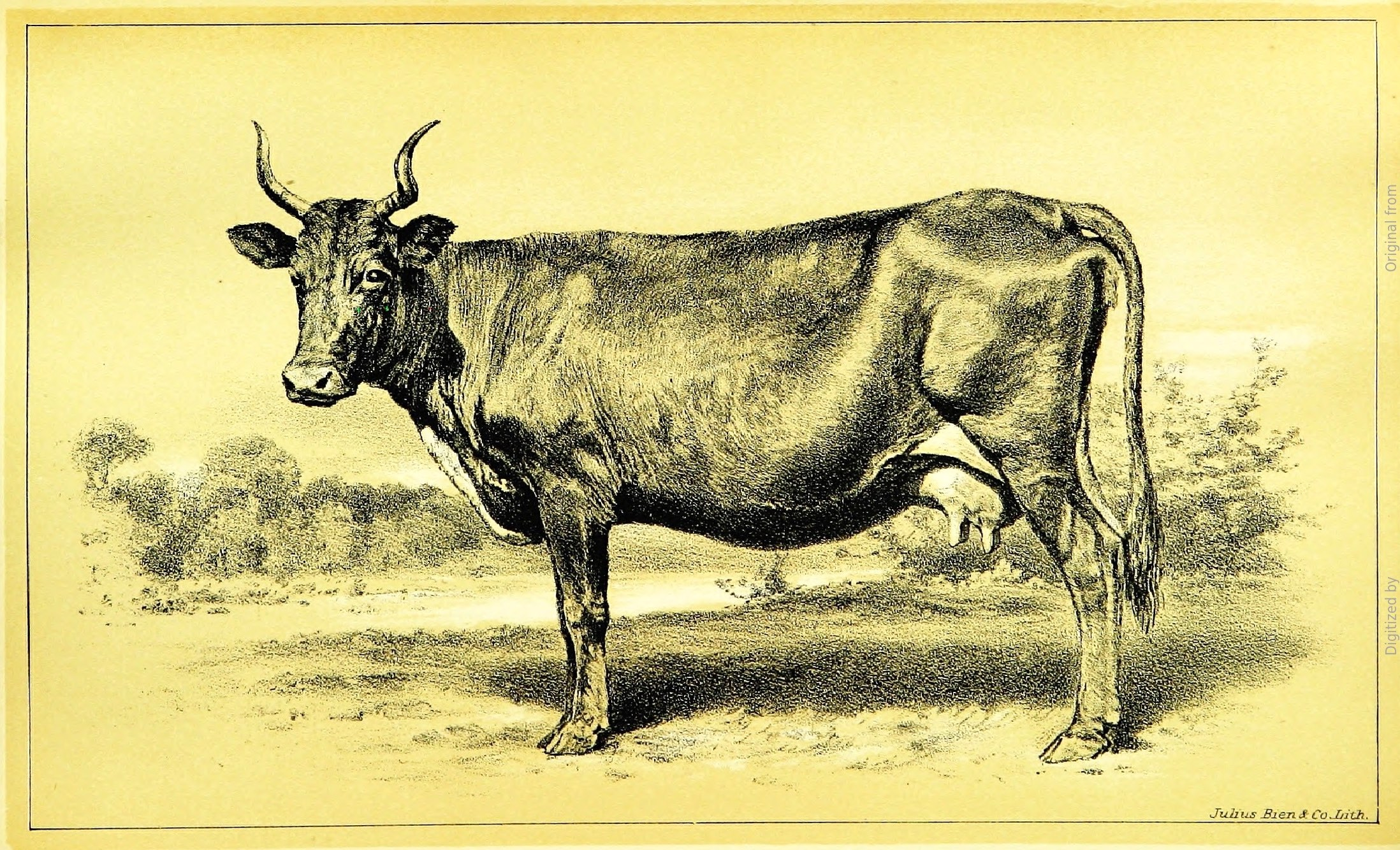
Russian cattle travelled enormous distances. A breed from Kostroma Oblast.

Describing the pull of London as a meat market for European farmers, Richard Peet said "It was as though a city of several million people were located just off the Dutch coast". A journalist, visiting Deptford market in 1889, reported:

From July to December the imports are greatest from the Northern Dutch and Baltic ports; from January to June the trade is briskest from Flushing and the Belgian ports; all the year round Germany sends us sheep from Bremen and Hamburg, and Spain and Portugal send cattle from Vigo and Porto.

The Spanish cattle were "beautiful chestnut brown in colour, sleek and well-built, though rather depressed in look, as Spanish cattle always are".

Some animals had more distant origins. Forrest Capie and Richard Perren said that, although most European animals were shipped from Rotterdam and Hamburg,

these towns were [just] the terminal stations of a great network of main German railway lines and branch lines that ran into Hungary, Poland, and Galicia and extended right up to Bessarabian frontier. In the 1860s the Dutch ports alone sent 150,000 cattle and 250,000 sheep to Britain, many of which passed through the markets of Austria and several German principalities before they reached their port of embarkation.

Several Deptford shipments arrived directly from the port of Kronstadt, in Russia, and were known to have been purchased in the cattle market of Saint Petersburg. The Russian capital was more than 30° to the east of Deptford, and these animals may have come from much further still, since Saint Petersburg oblast raised few export-grade cattle. They may have been driven to market from south Russia. In 1872 the Russian Empire was blacklisted for cattle plague and no more Russian cattle could be landed, even at Deptford.

==== Demise of European cattle trade ====
The European livestock trade was gradually stopped by the late 1880s — except for Iceland — after the British authorities faced the fact that too much livestock was really coming from places where disease was endemic "and the provincial authorities made no attempt to stamp it out". For example Prussia had stringent laws against animal disease but "the profits from smuggling cattle from Poland are too enticing".

By then the United States had become the main supplier.

=== From the United States ===
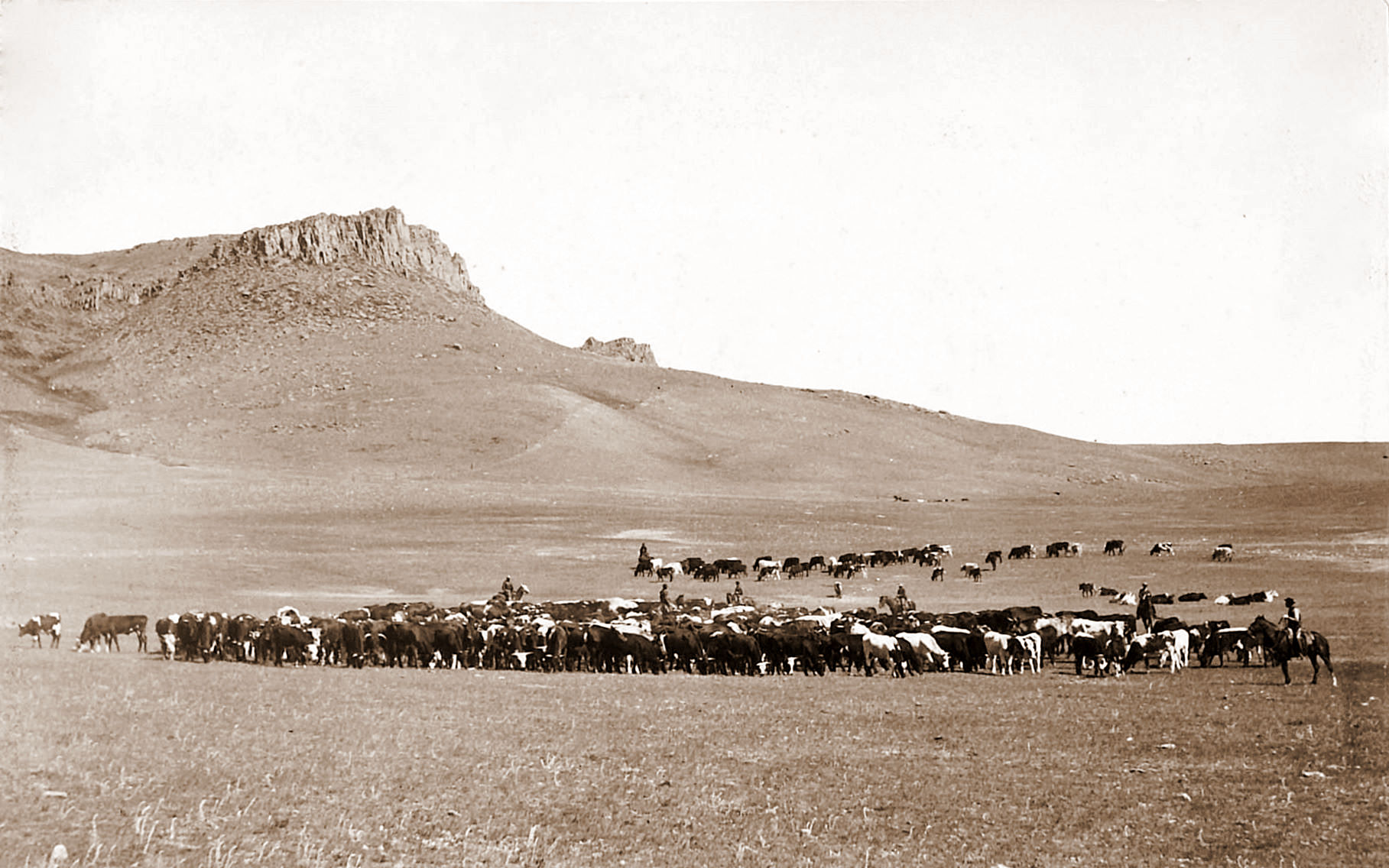
Cattle round-up, Montana, c.1890. Over 3 million American cattle went to Deptford market.

Of all the cattle ever landed at Deptford market, the largest proportion came from the U.S.A. The practice started in 1878 when American cattle and pigs were "scheduled" for port slaughter. By 1913, when Deptford closed, 3,144,400 American cattle had been landed there, besides sheep and pigs.

Nearly all American livestock exports went to England. Americans sent livestock to England because they had a surplus that could not be absorbed by local demand. When, eventually, it was, which happened by 1913, exportation ceased. Writing in 1915, two senior American officials said: "Our beef surplus has vanished and our own people now require all that our farms and ranches produce".

==== Upgrading livestock in the American West ====
The surplus came from the new, teeming lands of the American West. But early Western cattle e.g. Texas longhorns, though hardy, made tough eating. It cost exactly the same to ship a top quality steer from New York to London as a gristly one. Consequently, it made economic sense for American shippers to export their best animals, as better able to absorb the cost of carriage.

At first, export-grade cattle were to be found in the East only, where cattle breeds were similar to those of the British Isles. British farmers were advised not to worry about imported Western livestock for the present, because it would not compete on quality. But (as predicted) Western cattlemen realised they could capture lucrative markets by improving their stock — and did so. The English export trade contributed to the demand for more and better cattle.

Stockmen found profitable the exportation of only the choicest grade cattle and attained this quality by upgrading the range-stock with Shorthorn and Hereford blood... The trade therefore became a factor in improving the quality of American cattle.

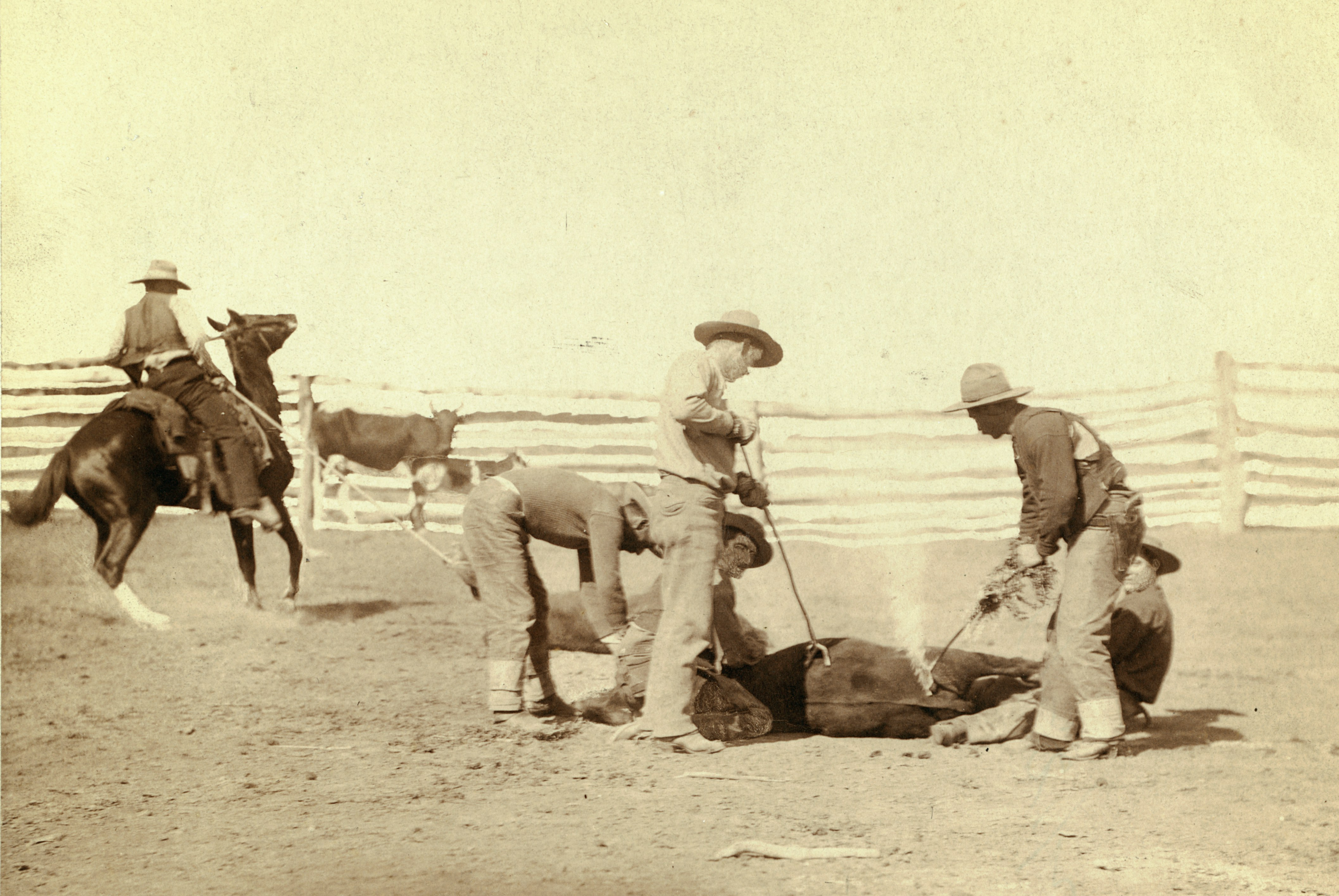
As Western cattle breeds improved, American beef competed on quality in London

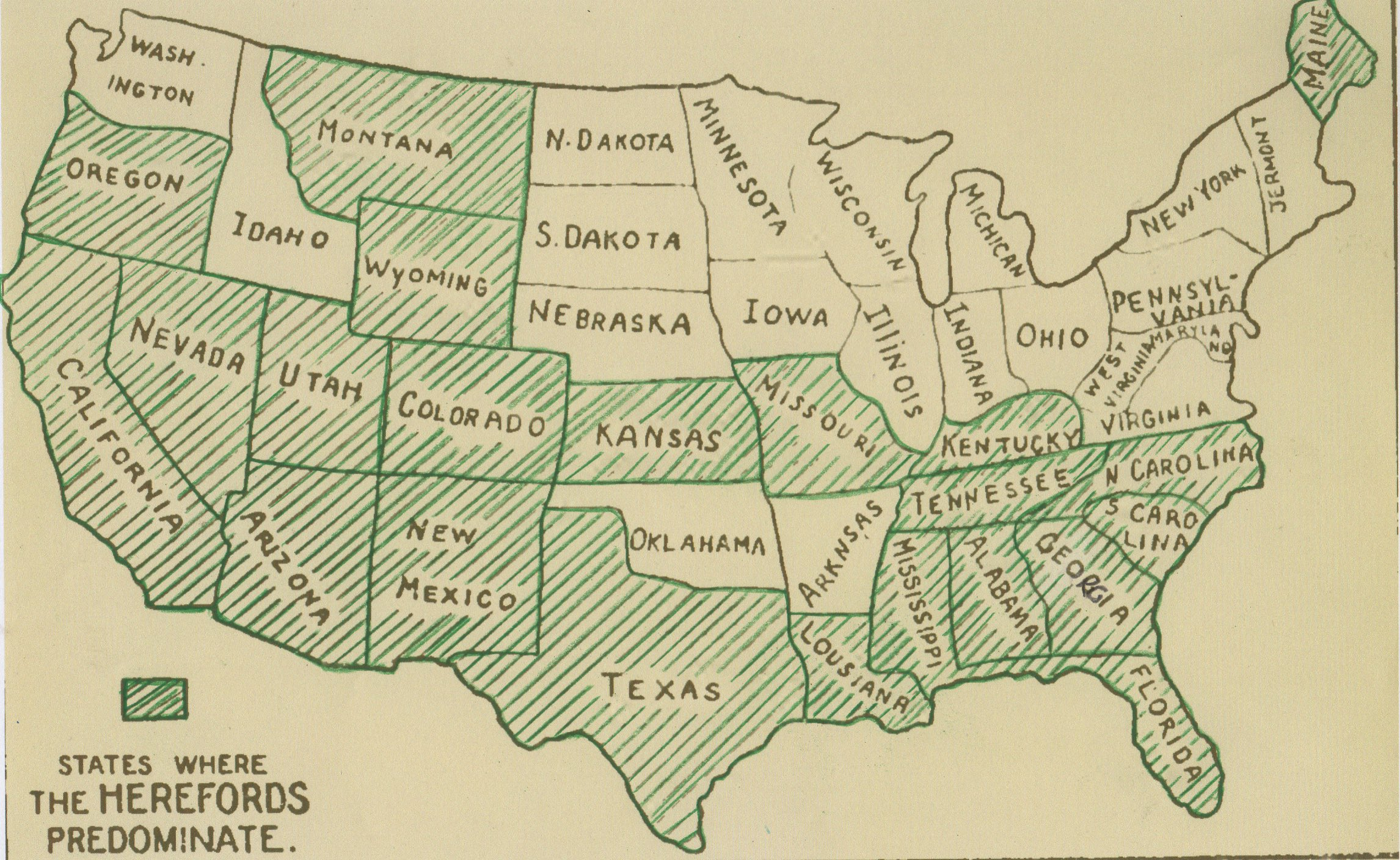
Prize bulls from the British Isles, especially Herefords, improved Western cattle

Progressive American cattlemen imported prize British bulls, sometimes paying fabulous prices. "On the western plains the ranches that succeeded the open range bought high priced sires with which to upgrade their old stock. The upturn in the quality of beef animals, with younger cattle going to the feedlot, meant better beef from the slaughter house and on the family table, all part of a general improvement".

It was the Hereford bull, more than any other single factor, that increased the size and quality of range cattle.

Comparable improvements were made in sheep. By 1884, 95% of cattle exported came from the West.

==== Distances ====
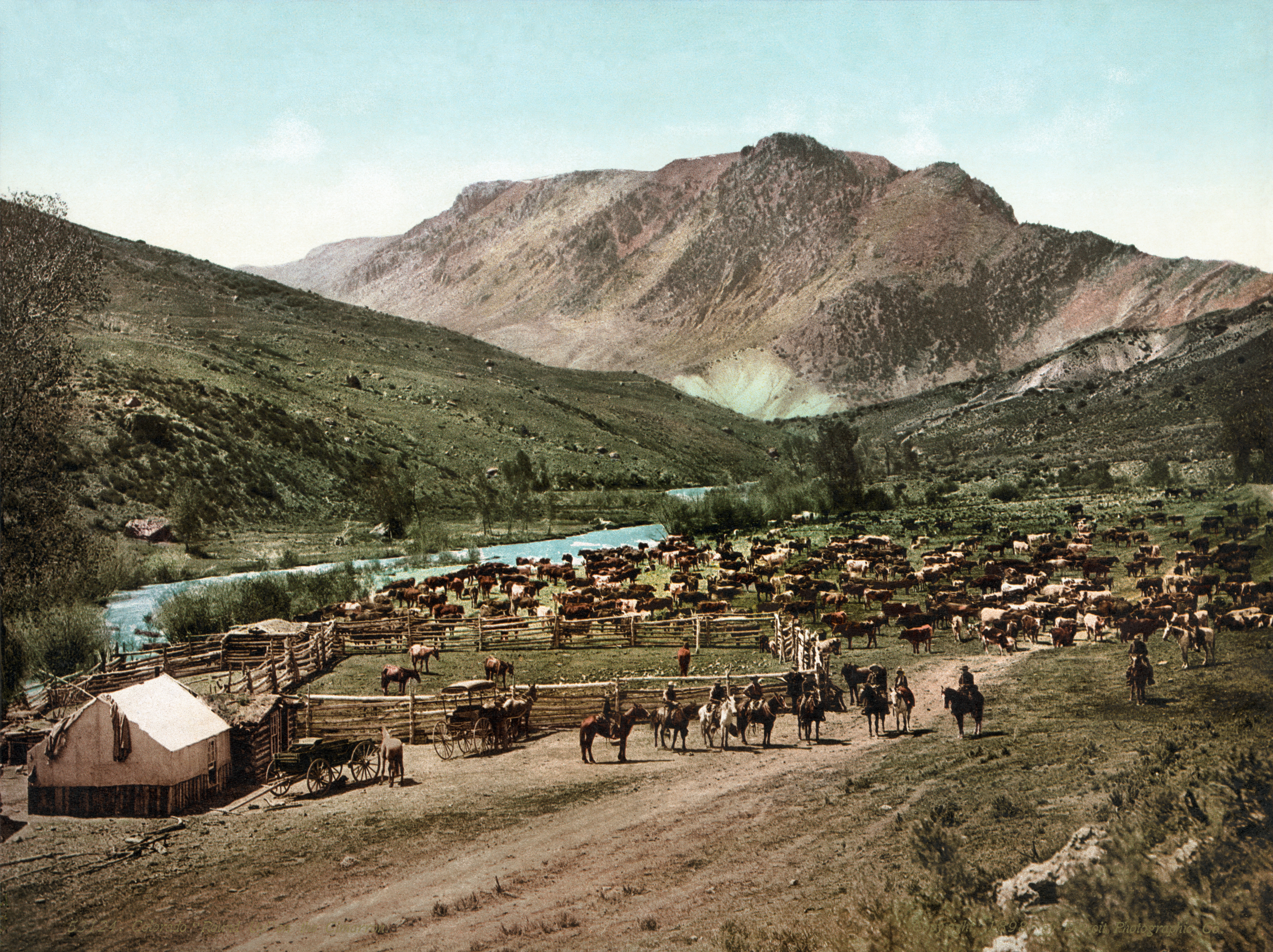
Cattle round-up, Colorado, 1898. Animals that went to Deptford travelled 5,000 miles.

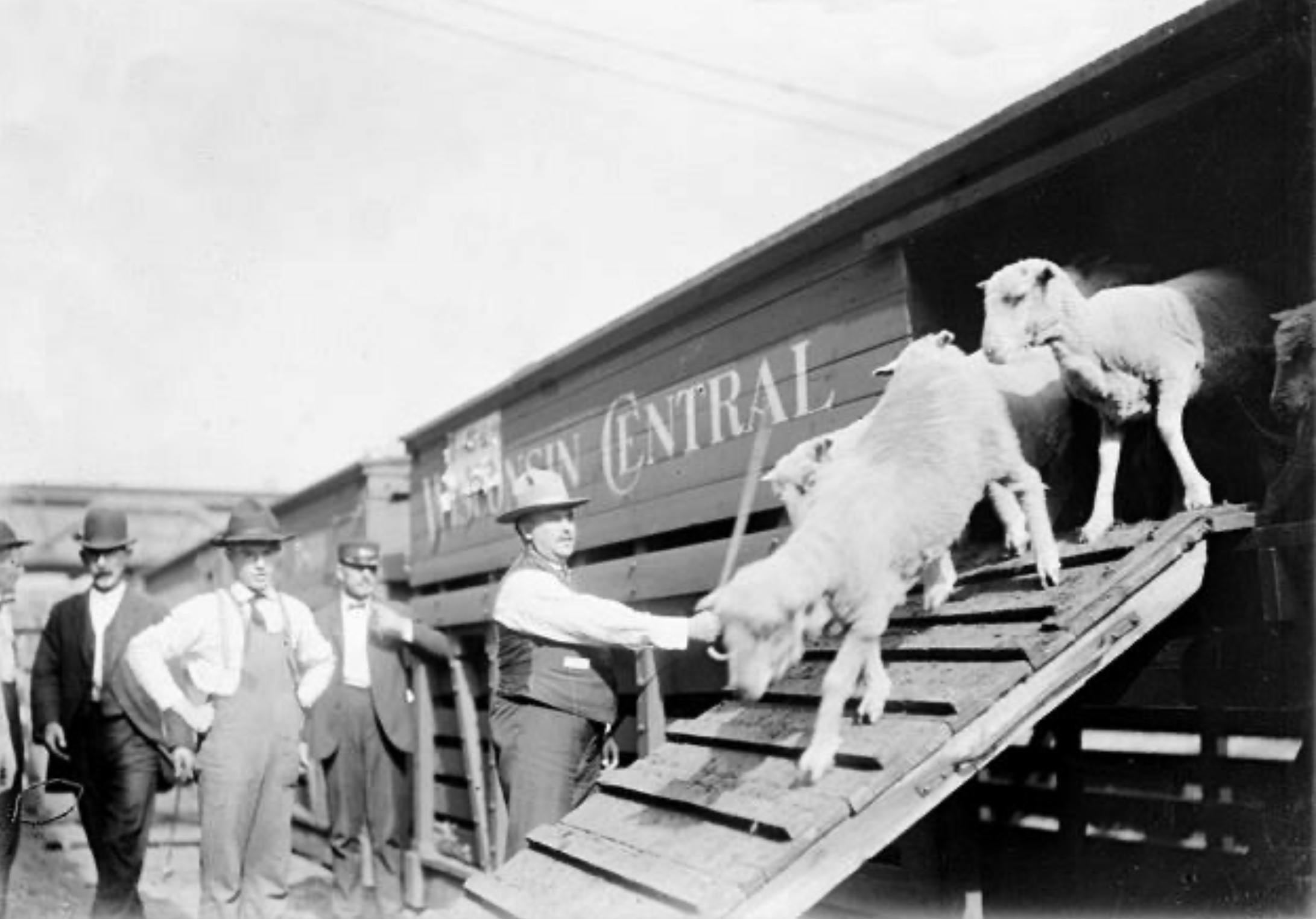
Chicago stockyards, 1904. Once in Chicago, animals had a 900 mile journey to New York followed by the Atlantic crossing to Deptford market.

Already in 1880 The Times was advising its readers that a 1,200 pounds (540 kg) steer from (say) Colorado, Wyoming or Montana could be conveyed to Deptford market — over 2,000 miles of land and 3,000 of ocean — for £10 or £12. It included cowboys' wages, rail fare, shipping freight and the landing charges at Deptford (which, thought the author, were rather extortionate). All this added only 4d a pound to the carcase price of beef (≅£4.40 a kilo_{2018}).

Scientific American reported that, recently, five cattle-laden steamers had sailed from New York to England in one day. The cattle in this new trade "come principally from Ohio, Kentucky, Illinois, Iowa, Missouri, Kansas, Nebraska and Colorado".

Some cattle came to Deptford from as far away as Oregon, though this was sporadic. The English adventurer Moreton Frewen, writing to The Times, said

Croma, due at Deptford Saturday, the 25th, has on board a hundred fat bullocks, the first consignment of western American cattle that have as yet taken advantage of the cheap transportation afforded by the Great Lakes. The majority of them were bred by myself and brother in Wyoming in 1881, but some few which can be distinguished by their brand ... are from far distant Oregon, and, having walked through from there to Wyoming in 1882, were purchased by me at the end of their long march. It is [remarkable] that beasts calved more than 6,000 miles away on the shores of the Pacific Ocean, matured in Wyoming and fattened on Lake Superior, should have been destined after crossing the Atlantic on the hoof, to "terminate their engagements" in the Thames.

==== Significance to the West ====
The exportation of cattle to England had a discernible impact on the American livestock industry. While not all American exports went to Deptford, London was the most important market. Wrote John P. Huttman:

The impact of foreign demand for U.S. meat, in which the British market figured so importantly, was reflected in the growth of the Western packinghouse industry, the expansion of railway traffic due to the movement of live and butchered animals, and the growth of livestock herds".

As noted, the trade became a factor in improving the quality of American cattle.

Further, some British agriculturalists, shielded until recently from American competition — first by distance, then by quality issues — found it attractive to go in for American ranching themselves. They "fought competition at its source and engaged directly in American ranching, until by 1884 it was estimated that 'one-sixth of all our herds are now owned by Englishmen'". And British investors, attracted by the fabulous profits sometimes realised in the West, made an important contribution to its development.

=== From Canada ===
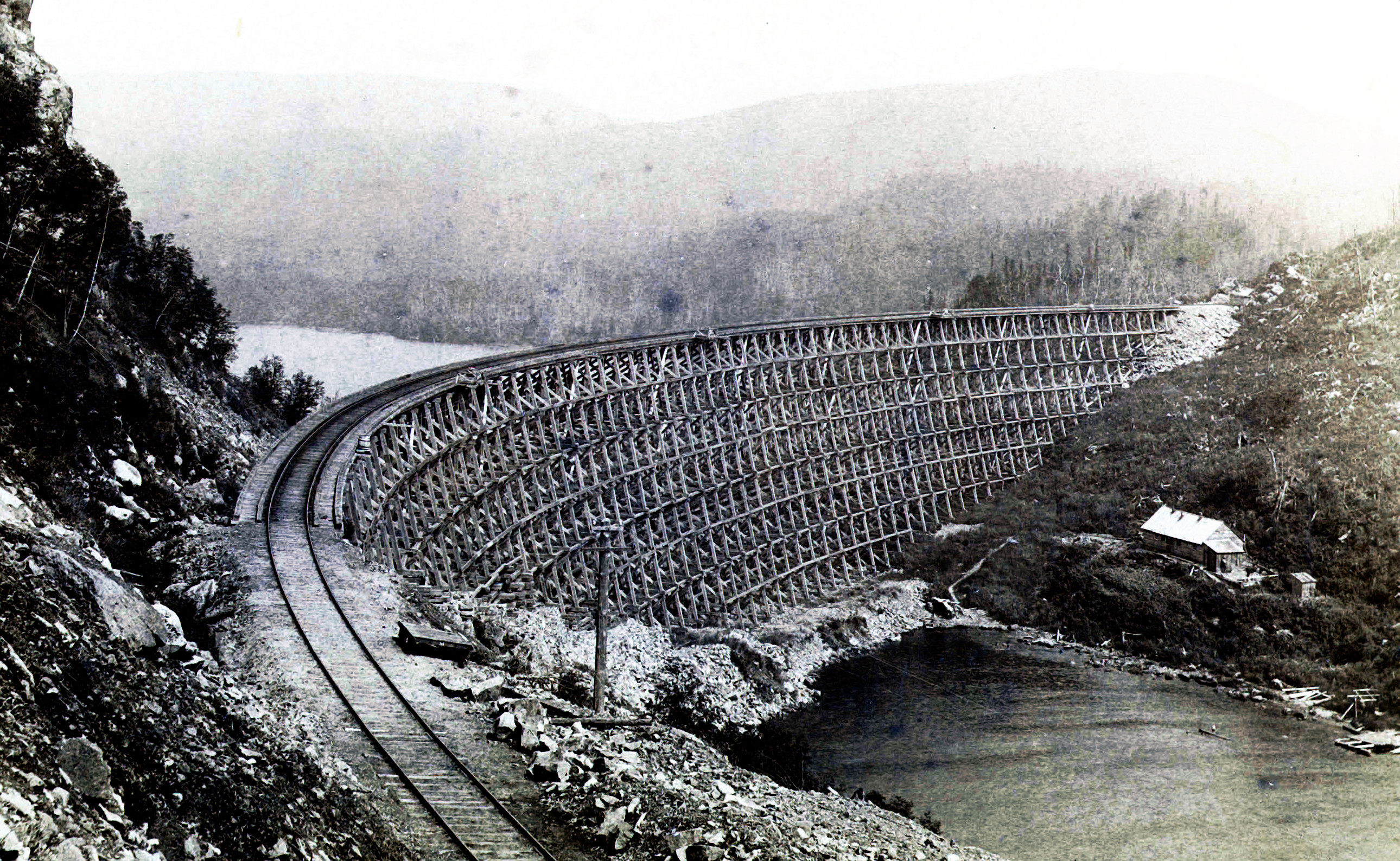
Canadian Pacific Railway, timber trestle bridge over arm of Lake Superior, 1889

A major export industry at the time, range cattle came from Alberta and Assiniboia and went east on the Canadian Pacific Railway. The St. Lawrence River route meant that cattle started the voyage in calm waters and comparatively cool weather. "Most of the losses of cattle in shipments from Atlantic ports were due to delay and neglect prior to shipping and occurred during the first few days of the crossing". For many years Canadian livestock was considered disease-free and could be landed freely, but it was scheduled for slaughter at Deptford from 1892 on. It did western ranchers little harm:

The movement of high quality to the British market continued unabated. These great range-bred cattle had to be slaughtered within the port holding pens anyway, because they were too wild to ship conveniently to provincial butchers.

Exports to England rose from 115,000 cattle in 1900 to 160,000 in 1905, but petered out after a severe winter depleted half the range-cattle industry's working capital.

=== From Argentina ===
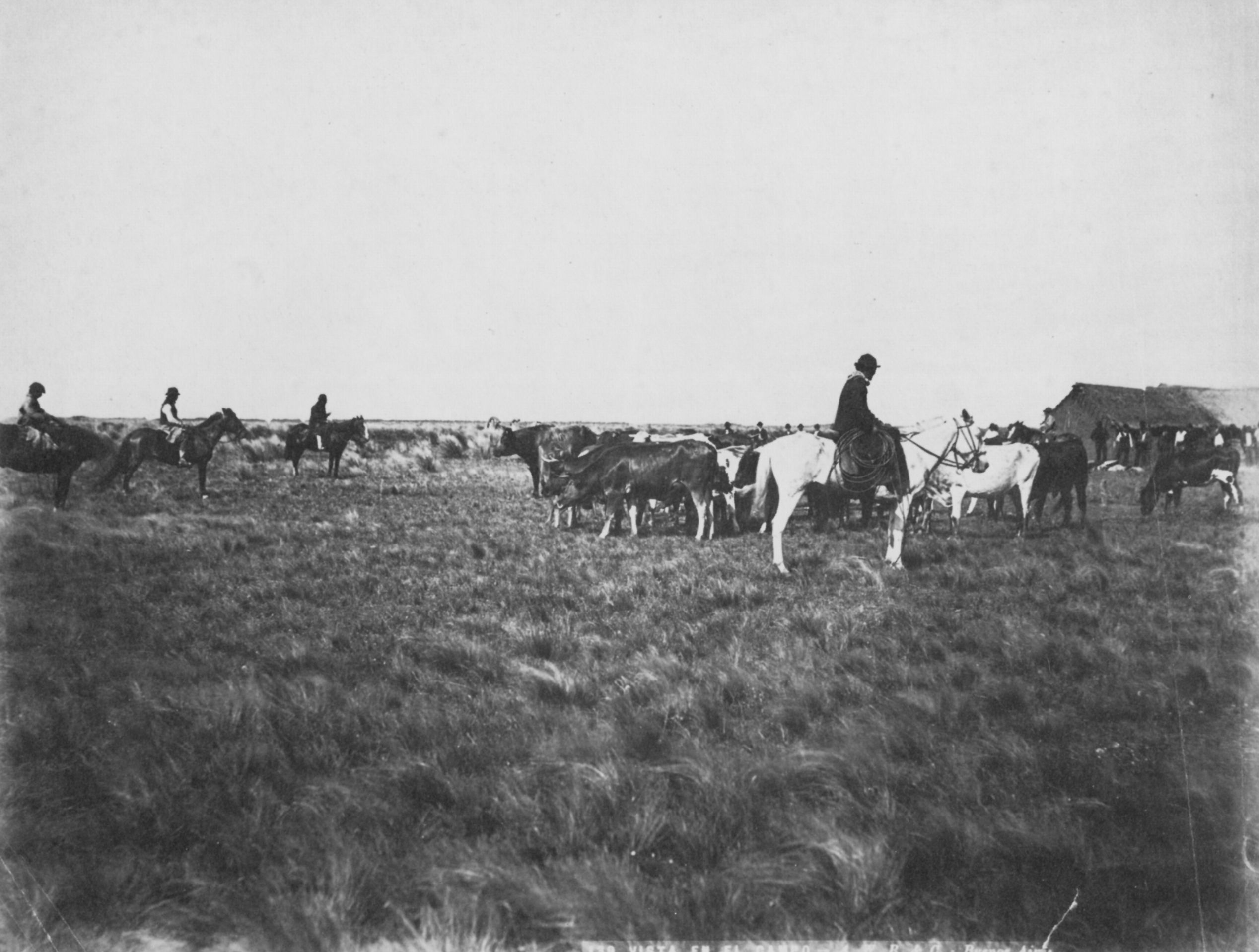
Gauchos herding cattle, Buenos Aires Province, c.1880

As the North American surplus dwindled, Deptford's main supply of animals came from Argentina. Formerly, Argentine cattle "were of an inferior breed, their chief characteristics being thick hides and well-developed horns"; they were slaughtered locally for their hides, bones and tallow. Two things transformed the Argentine beef industry into the greatest exporter in the world: selective breeding and alfalfa (lucerne) forage.

From about 1888 live cattle and sheep were shipped as deck cargo from Buenos Aires, carpenters knocking up temporary stalls and pens. Animals were brought to Buenos Aires e.g. 450 to 750 miles by rail and hoisted aboard vessels by steam crane. The voyage to London took about 30 days. Progressive Argentine cattlemen were keenly aware that quality was important, and they paid large prices for Shorthorn bulls to improve their herds. Such was the demand for export-grade cattle in 1903 that an American agent told his government "it is extremely difficult to get a good piece of beef in the city of Buenos Aires". "Wild, untamed brutes" did badly on the sea journey, and had to be tamed in advance and taught to eat hay.

Deptford was closed to Argentine cattle and sheep in 1900 for foot-and-mouth, and briefly re-opened in 1903. Thereafter there was scant incentive to revive the live meat trade on these very long journeys. From about 1900 good chilled Argentine beef was a more satisfactory alternative. Severe unemployment came to Deptford.

=== From Australia and New Zealand ===
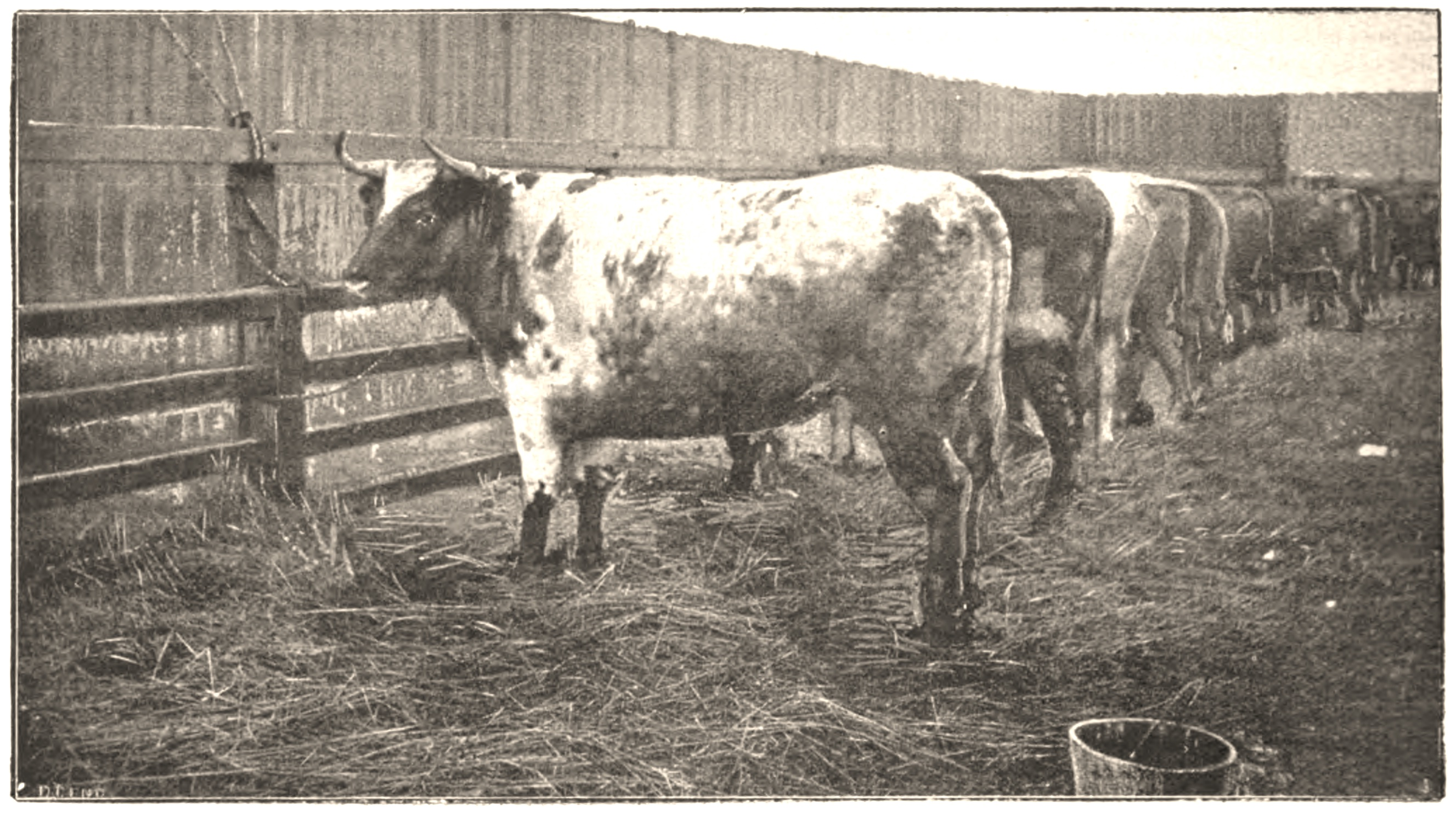
Australian cattle in fine condition at Deptford Market, 1895, the most successful shipment

At the end of the Victorian era cattle and sheep were shipped to Deptford Market from as far away as Victoria (Australia), New South Wales, Queensland, and Dunedin, New Zealand.

The first commercial (though experimental) shipment was from Sydney on the steamer Maori King, a 67-day voyage which went around Cape Horn in winter — presumably to avoid the heat of the Suez Canal. The cattle landed at Deptford in September 1894, but sold at a heavy loss. Next year there was a much more successful voyage by Port Pirie: one animal died of heat in the Red Sea, but the others arrived in excellent condition (see illustration). Another success was 250 sheep per Banffshire from Dunedin; only one was lost.

However, as shipments continued there were "terrible" losses. For these ambitious voyages more than halfway round the world, excellent planning and execution were essential, but were wanting.

The Angers shipment of 381 cattle from Gladstone, Queensland, clapped an extinguisher on the trade. The vessel left the port on November 22, 1895, and arrived at Deptford on February 9, 1896, with 32 animals [alive], some of which were in a maimed condition. The Royal Society for the Prevention of Cruelty to Animals took the matter up, and the Board of Agriculture inspected the ship and issued an order prohibiting the Angers from carrying live stock from or to any port in Great Britain for a twelvemonth.

Altogether in the Australasian live trade, 607 cattle were lost out of 2,654 shipped, and 57 out of 3,882 sheep.

== The Beef Trust ==
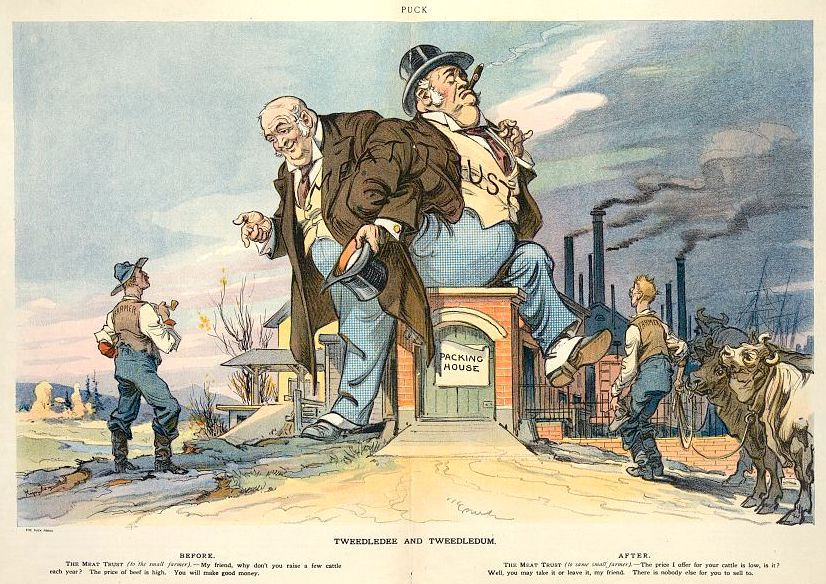
The Beef Trust (1913 cartoon, Udo Keppler)

The Beef Trust was a cartel of the large Chicago meat packers. Acting in collusion they allocated market shares and fixed meat prices in the United States, eventually coming under attack by "trust buster" president Theodore Roosevelt. As described in the next section, by 1900 the Beef Trust controlled the business of shipping live cattle to England from America.

In the Edwardian era reputable newspapers claimed that

- the Trust had bought up many shops in Smithfield Market;
- they met every morning to fix the price of British beef;
- they practically controlled the lairages at Deptford Market; but
- instead of selling their Deptford cattle to buyers at that market, they sent the meat directly to Smithfield; with the result that, on a numerous occasions, market days at Deptford were cancelled for lack of support.

As a result of persistent questioning by C. W. Bowerman, Labour MP for Deptford, Winston Churchill (the President of the Board of Trade) set up an inquiry into "how far and in what manner the general supply, distribution and price of Meat in the United Kingdom are controlled or affected by any combination of firms or companies". The inquiry reported in 1909. The allegations were generally true, except that the Trust was not powerful enough to fix the price of beef in the United Kingdom. This was because, although it did indeed control the North Atlantic meat trade, American beef exports had declined, and large shipments of refrigerated beef were coming from Argentina.

== Animal welfare: journeys ==
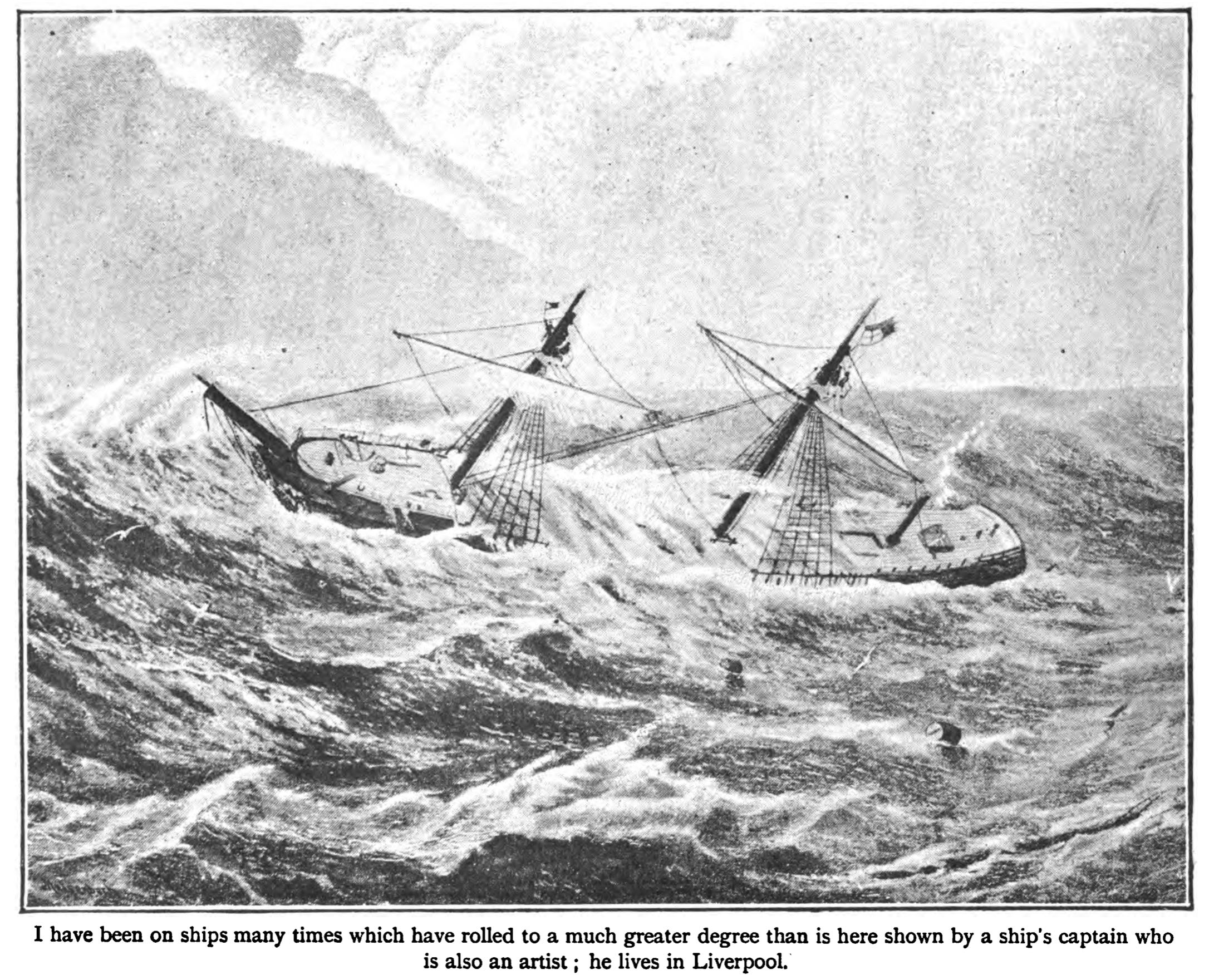
Stress of weather (from Samuel Plimsoll's Cattle Ships)

Animals were sent from the grasslands of the world to be slaughtered at Deptford market. Even today, when animal welfare is a consideration and the average journey from feedlot to slaughter plant lasts just a few hours, transport-related stress and injury are major sources of loss to the American meat industry. According to Temple Grandin, fear, which motivates animals to avoid predators, is a very strong stressor during transport. Animals unaccustomed to human beings are liable to be stressed more, and in that era of range cattle there were many. An American special agent, reporting on the overseas shipping of untamed Argentine cattle (1904), said:

The wild creatures wear themselves out trying to break away. They are in abject terror of everything near them, for they have never been restrained in any way before. Everything is new, and they do not understand that they will not be hurt, as the better trained animals do. They have never seen any dry food, and for days they do not eat.

In the Victorian era there was much publicity about the iniquities of transatlantic cattle ships. Before crossing the Atlantic, however, most animals had endured journeys in cattle trains, sometimes travelling for a week or more. A paper read before the American Veterinary Medical Association claimed that the train journeys had been overlooked, being as bad as the sea voyages if not worse.

=== Transatlantic cattle ships ===
American cattle most often sailed from New York; also Boston, Philadelphia, Baltimore and Portland. Canadian cattle were shipped from the port of Montreal; Argentine cattle and sheep from the port of Buenos Aires.

==== Early days ====
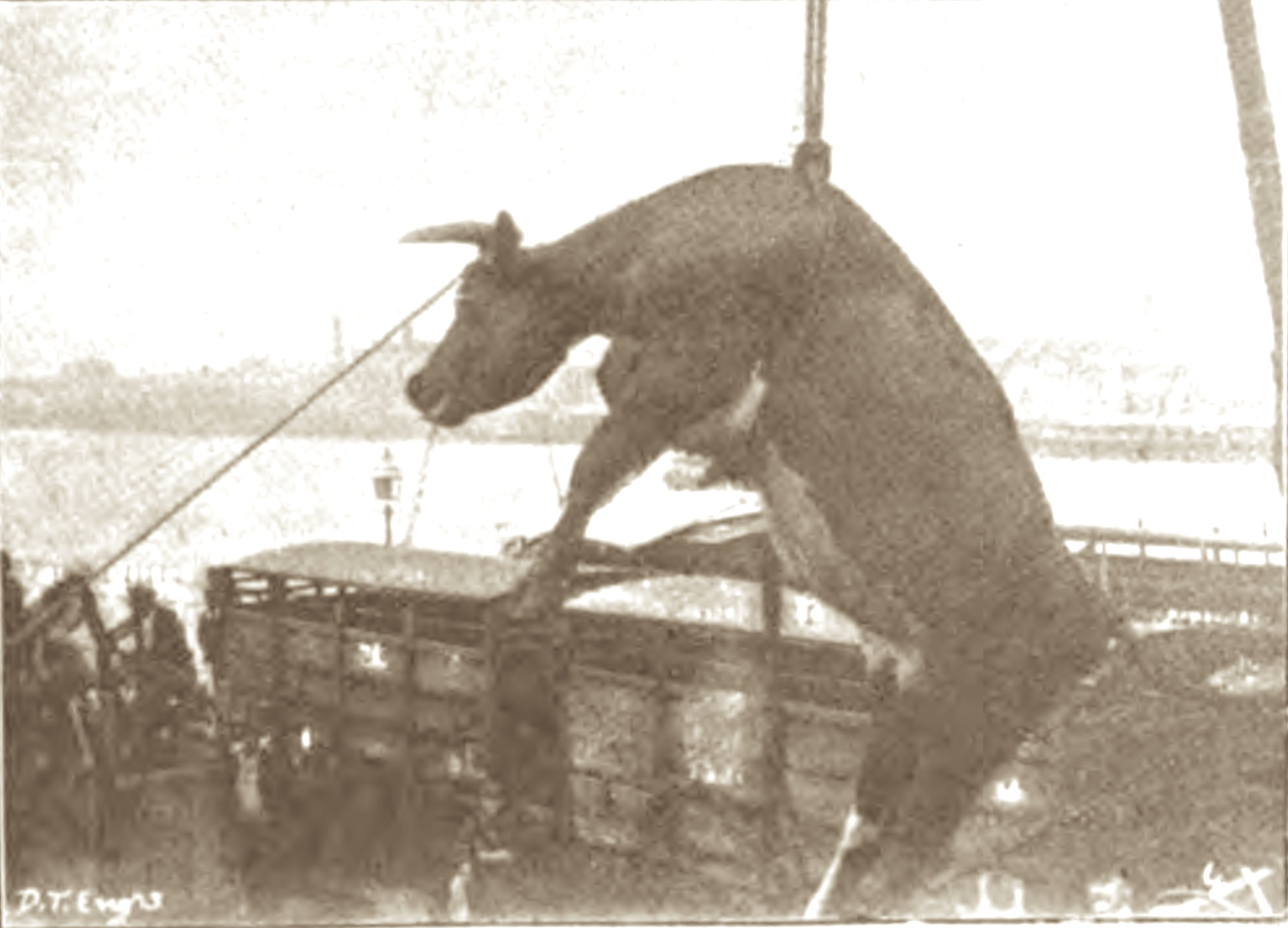
Careless handling (here, a slipped sling, Sydney, 1894) caused injury on cattle boats

Sending cattle safely across the Atlantic demanded forward planning and know-how. Quite often these were lacking, especially in the early days, when conditions were "very bad", or "little better than the horrors of 'the middle passage' of the old slave trading days". According to a government inquiry the worst culprits were tramp steamers, neither specialising in the trade nor built for it. When freights were high these vessels were hastily rigged up with temporary decks and crammed tightly with cattle.

Risk was greatest in winter, when insurance rates soared to 10% "as a heavy storm may make it necessary to lighten the ship by throwing the entire deck load of cattle overboard".

In 1879 the British government's chief veterinary officer reported on animals jettisoned from transatlantic cattle ships or dying on board from injury or suffocation. Describing the losses as "terrible", he said 10,667 animals were thrown overboard, 1,210 were landed dead, and 718 were so badly injured or exhausted that they had to be slaughtered on landing.

==== Samuel Plimsoll ====
In 1890 Samuel Plimsoll, having successfully campaigned for his Plimsoll line, turned to the transatlantic cattle trade. He said it ought to be abolished. In Cattle Ships he seized the reader's attention thus:

The Erin sailed from New York in December, 1889, with 527 cattle on board, for London, and has never since been heard of; she had 74 men on board.

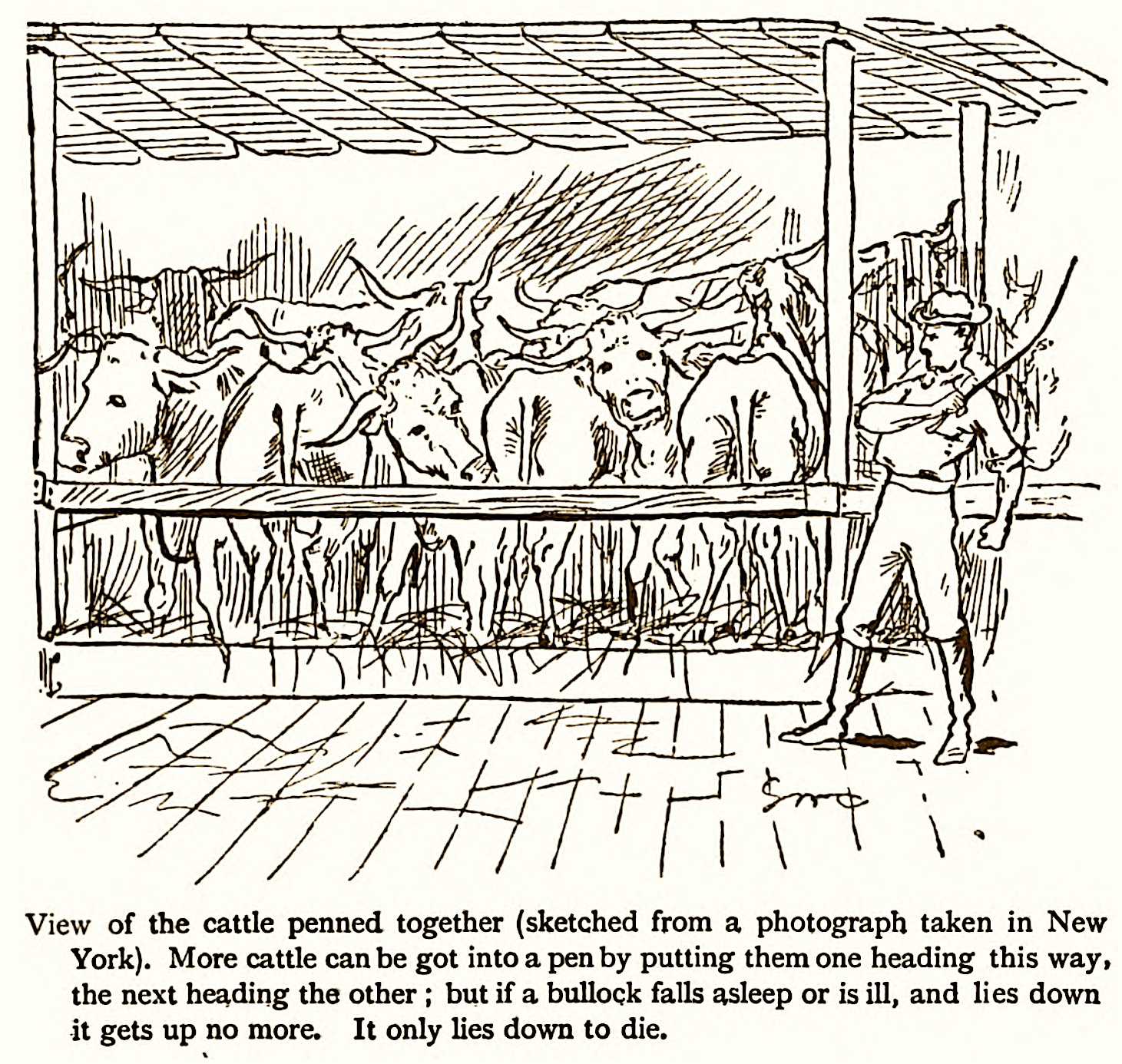
Overcrowding according to Plimsoll. Though seldom packed as tight as this, it did happen.

Plimsoll wrote that cattle ships were dangerously unstable in stormy weather, cruel to animals, and unnecessary. They were unstable if cattle were carried on the upper deck or (worse) on a temporary, higher platform that raised the ship's centre of gravity even further, and obstructed the crew in their duties. Animals were washed overboard by heavy seas, or were deliberately jettisoned to save the vessel. If carried down in the holds they could stifle to death after the hatches were battened down in bad weather. Knowing this, captains sometimes took risks in leaving the hatches open. Further, animals stood on their own dung, which could not be cleared away; on this slippery surface they fell about helplessly and were injured, often fatally.

Plimsoll alleged that cattle attendants were not allowed to euthanise badly injured livestock, because the insurance companies would refuse to pay up. Animals were left to die a lingering death. Plimsoll was probably wrong about the insurance companies; but it made no difference, because the cattle attendants thought it was so and behaved accordingly.

Another accusation was that cattle attendants used cruel methods to make animals get on their feet, such as piercing them with pitchforks, twisting their tails, beating them about the head with iron buckets, or pouring paraffin in their ears. "Some of the men in charge, who are paid a percentage on the number of cattle they bring alive into Deptford, tortured the animals most fiendishly into a semblance of animation". It was indignantly denied by cattle shippers, who asked what they had to gain by such practices: cattle were free to lie down if they wanted to.

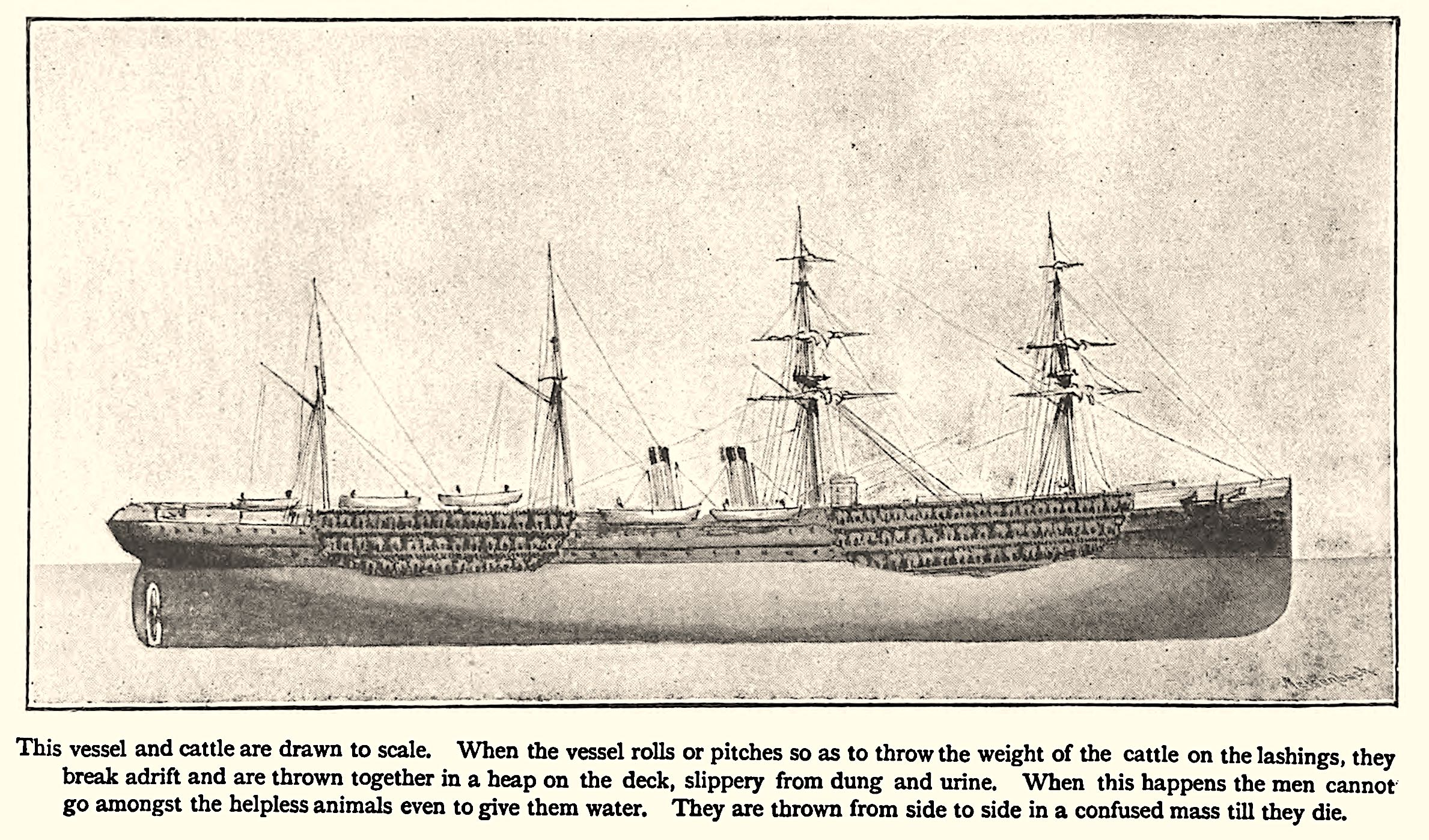
Cattle ship according to Samuel Plimsoll and his campaign to abolish them

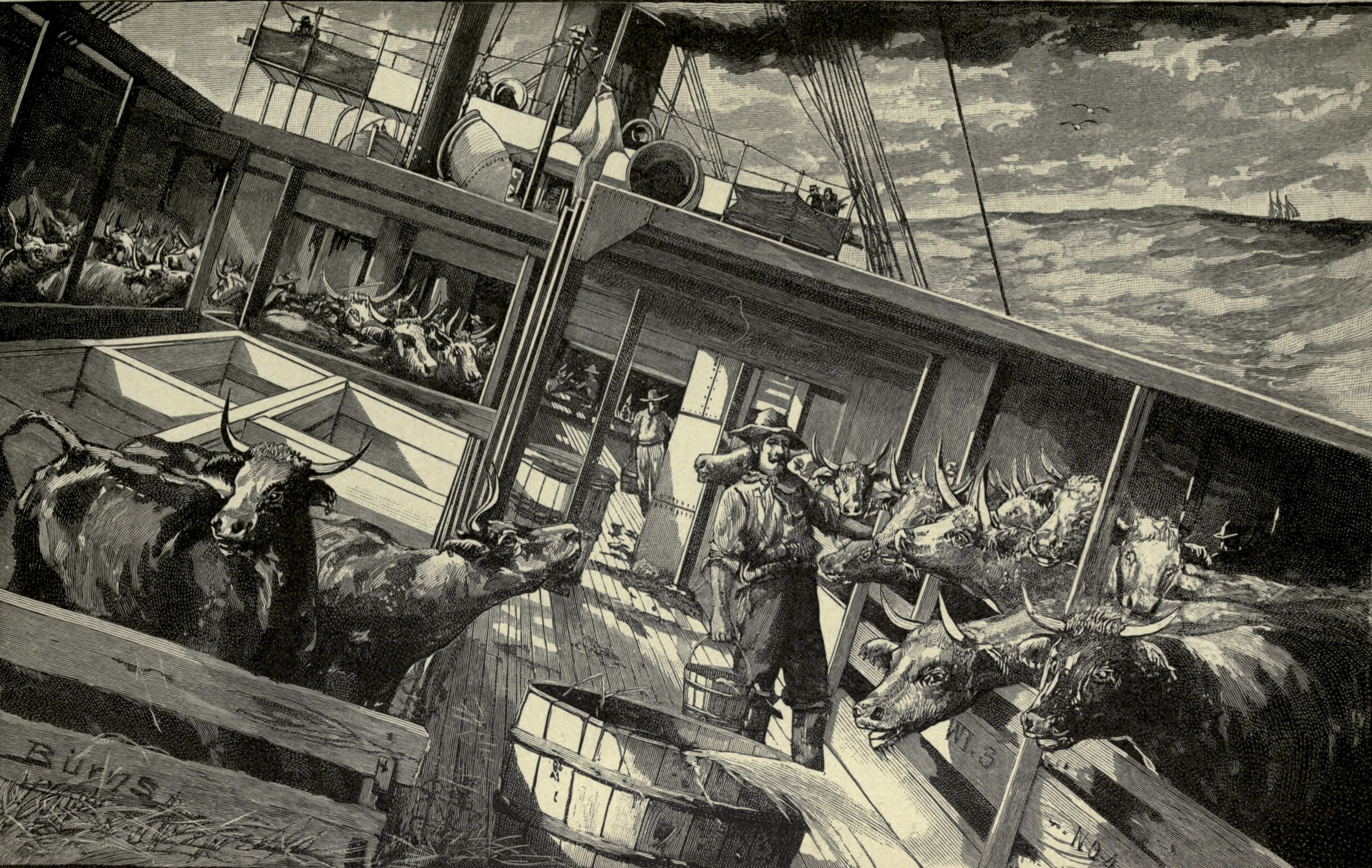
A better class of steamer, good weather, adequate ventilation

The cattle attendants included foremen known as "cowboys of the seas", "big burly fellows who are used to rough living and facing danger"; also a despised class called "stiffs" who did the work for little or no pay just to get across the Atlantic. Sometimes educated men e.g. Harvard students travelled as stiffs. The poet W.H. Davies was a stiff and wrote about the harsh methods used to make the cattle stand up; so did an English solicitor returning from a working holiday in Canada. It was done to stop animals tangling their head ropes, or being trampled to death by their fellows.

==== Improvements ====
A government inquiry tended to confirm many of Plimsoll's allegations. Although he did not succeed in abolishing the trade, British and American regulations prohibited some of the worst practices.

When the export trade became well organised it was dominated by four American meat packers: Swift, Armour, Hammond and Morris: members of the "Beef Trust". They were not shipowners, but they established a liner system. (A liner is a ship that sails to a schedule; a tramp, when she has a cargo.) It was essential to organise a regular liner trade because cattle transportation required close coordination, regularity and long-term contractual relationships. For example, to make sure of shipping space it had to be bought in advance without knowing if London spot meat prices were going to make it worthwhile. It was to the business advantage of shippers (hence, liners) that livestock arrive in the Thames on time and in excellent condition. By 1892 North Atlantic animal losses were reduced to less than 1%, ten times better than on the Buenos Aires run.

Even in the good liners, however, the dung and urine were left to accumulate in the holds; the ammoniacal stench was said to be unbearable. According to Scientific American

Cattle on deck often have the seawater which comes on board frozen on their backs, and heavy rolls and pitches cause many broken legs.

The average run from New York to the Thames was 11 days. Cattle could scent land, sometimes setting up "a united bellow" when thirty or forty hours from shore.

=== Cattle trains ===
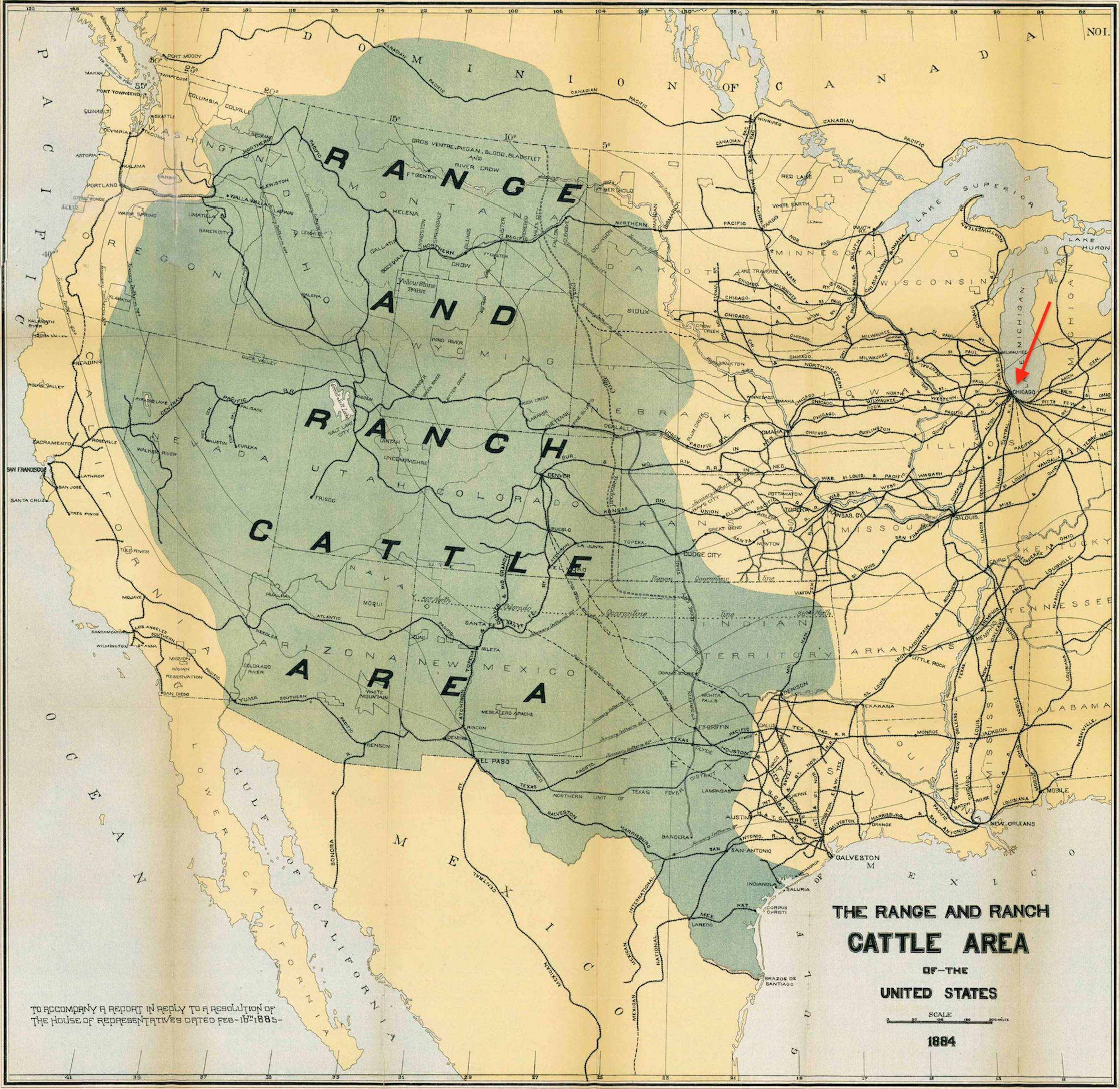
Cattle railroad map, American West, 1894. ↓ denotes Chicago, from where choice animals were re-shipped to ports on the eastern seaboard for export to England.

From the livestock-raising regions animals were taken to market by train, mostly to Chicago. onto which 17 railroads converged. At the Chicago stockyards there was a special market for "export grade" cattle; these were railed to ports on the eastern seaboard for shipment to England. The map also shows the Canadian Pacific Railway that took livestock from the foothills of the Rocky mountains to Montreal.

==== Lengthy journeys ====
Animals were not supposed to travel more than 28 hours at a time, according to a U.S. federal law of 1873, after which they must be got off the train for water, food and 5 hours rest. Quite often at these stops, however, the railroad companies, who were not very enthusiastic about the cattle trade, neglected to provide proper water or food, or there was nowhere to rest because the station stockyard was a sea of mud or a drift of snow.

The 28-hour limit was widely ignored, and there was even something to be said for that, because repeatedly unloading and reloading the animals could do them more harm than leaving them on the train. Thus in 1906 the law was amended to allow animals to be carried for up to 36 hours at a time if the owners agreed, and from then on the law was enforced

'Palace' or "parlor" stock cars were special vehicles supposed to furnish water and hay for animals to consume en route, and hence exempted from the 28-hour law. Thus they could and did run for 60 or even 100 hours at a time. It seems that in reality, however, water and food were seldom supplied to these vehicles: some thought they were a sham.

==== Overcrowding and injury ====
Shipping space was usually sold by the carload, so there was an incentive to cram in as many animals as possible to save freight charges, which were high. Some held that tight packing was good for the animals because it stopped them fighting or lying down, or falling over when the engine jerked the train or when it went round a tight curve.

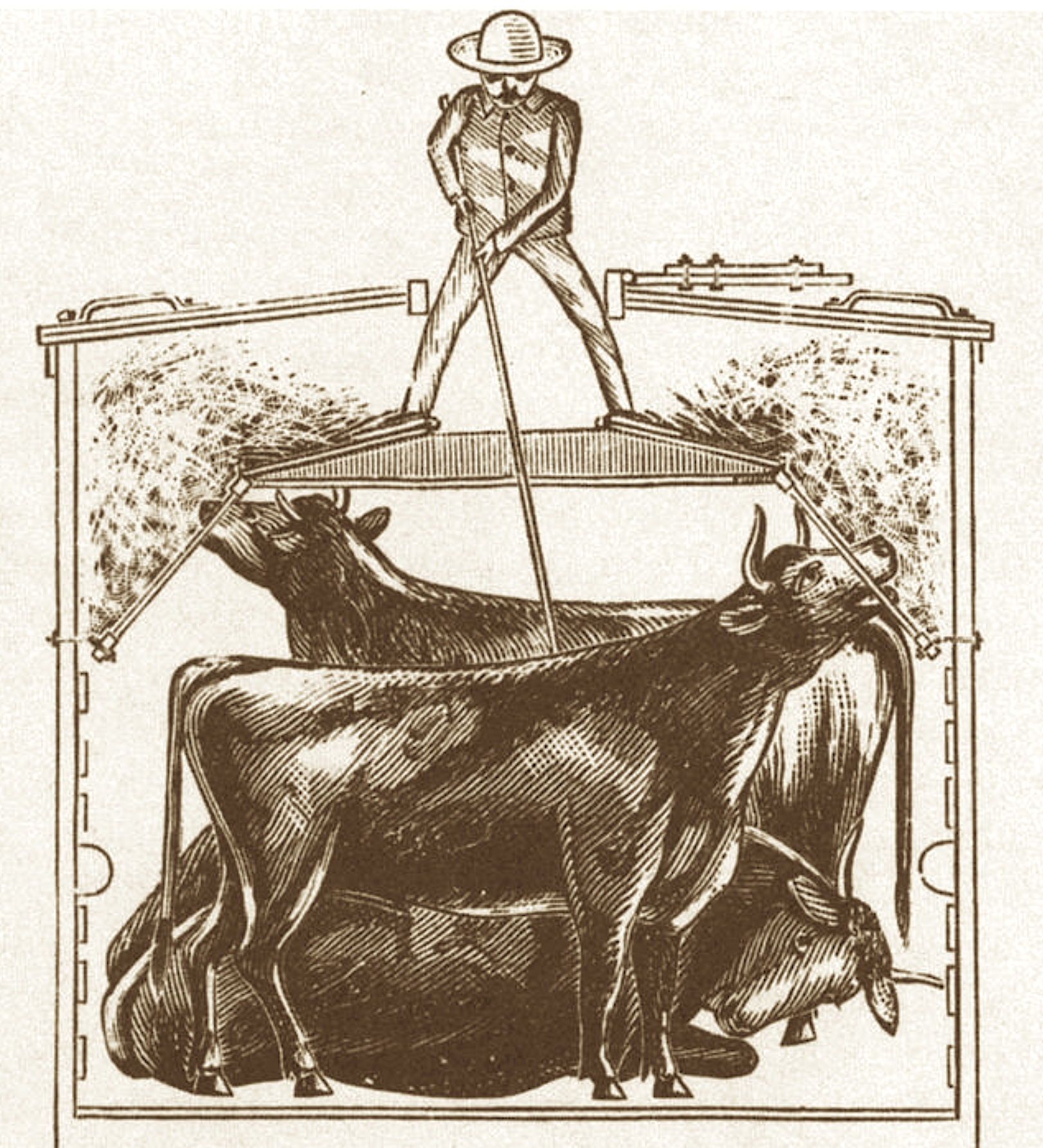
A "palace" cattle car (schematic), by law allowed to convey livestock for any length of time. A prod pole man tries to make an animal stand.

If a steer did fall, or lay down to rest, there was a risk that it might never get up again. Consequently cattle attendants, who travelled in the caboose, went round at intervals and, if they spotted a recumbent animal, tried to make it stand up. For this purpose there was a special tool called a cattle prod which, if the steer was not actually dying, usually worked. A stockman recalled:

The toughest job I ever undertook was to start from the Missouri River and land a consignment of cattle in the Union Stock Yards, Chicago, without a loss. The first run was three hundred miles across the State of Iowa to the Mississippi River; it generally took thirty-six hours, two nights and a day. In loading cattle, on account of the freight charges, you naturally would get every steer in a car you could. The steers had "standing room only"; consequently, if a steer got down, which was a very common occurrence, on account of the fatigue from standing too long, it was either to get that steer on his feet again or he would be trampled to death, and away would go the profit on that car of cattle.

He described how:

Sometimes you could raise him by standing alongside of the car and using your prod — a pole about six feet long with a sharp iron point in one end of it — but often you had to climb into the end window of the car and go right among them, horns, droppings, and all, and take your chances of ever getting out alive, the trainmen paying no attention to you, the train running thirty miles an hour, and maybe it is night and as dark as pitch.

A government official wrote: "Under the present system not a train is brought to any great market without having many crippled beeves, and several dead ones".

==== In Canada ====
There was no 28-hour law in Canada and rail journeys were immense. The Canadian Live Stock Commissioner said the method of exporting western range cattle was "sinfully wasteful, unbusinesslike and unprofitable to the producer", so that Canadian cattle arrived in Britain "gaunt and shrunken".

== Whether economic justification for live cattle trade ==
In the Victorian era the necessity and economic rationale of the transatlantic cattle trade were called in question, since imported chilled meat was a viable alternative. Samuel Plimsoll claimed that the live trade survived only because dishonest profits were being made.

=== An alternative to the live cattle trade ===
An alternative to the live cattle trade was American chilled meat. Already imported into London in 1875, before the Foreign Cattle Market was doing much business, it was a commercial success. It was much cheaper to send meat across the Atlantic chilled than on the hoof; it required refrigerating plant, but it took up less space and only the edible parts were shipped.

=== Plimsoll's case ===
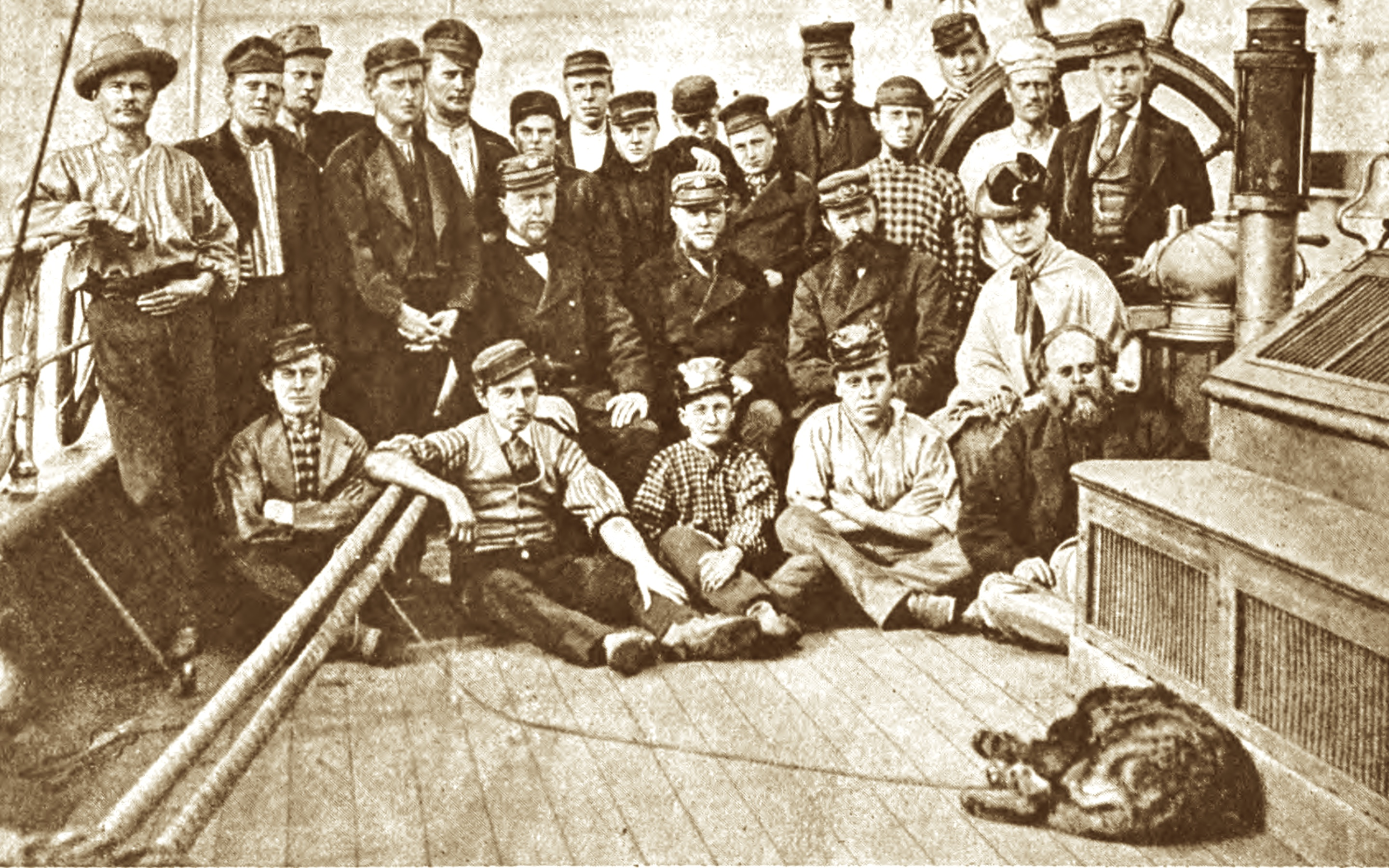
Samuel Plimsoll, his wife (sitting behind him), and a group of seamen

Samuel Plimsoll argued that the transatlantic cattle trade had no rational commercial purpose except to enrich dishonest traders. He asked:

Why are live cattle imported at all, when their beef can be more cheaply and easily imported, and in better condition?

And he answered:

By sending the animals alive the middlemen (sometimes English, sometimes American) who consign the cattle to salesmen, can add to their legitimate profit a wholly illegitimate one, which belongs by right to the English grazier, by calling it, or stating it to be, that which it is not — namely "best Scotch", "town-killed", or "English-fed" beef. This they could not do if it were imported dead.

==== Imported dead vs. alive ====
It was true that there was a prejudice against foreign meat; further — unlike Deptford-killed meat — imported chilled meat was visibly foreign. Butchers could tell that wholesale meat was American if it was imported dead, because meat slaughtered in America was cut ("dressed") according to American butchering practices, which were different. Also, the chilling process slightly discoloured the product. In contrast, American meat killed at Deptford was dressed by British butchers, hence appeared to br the same as British-fed beef.

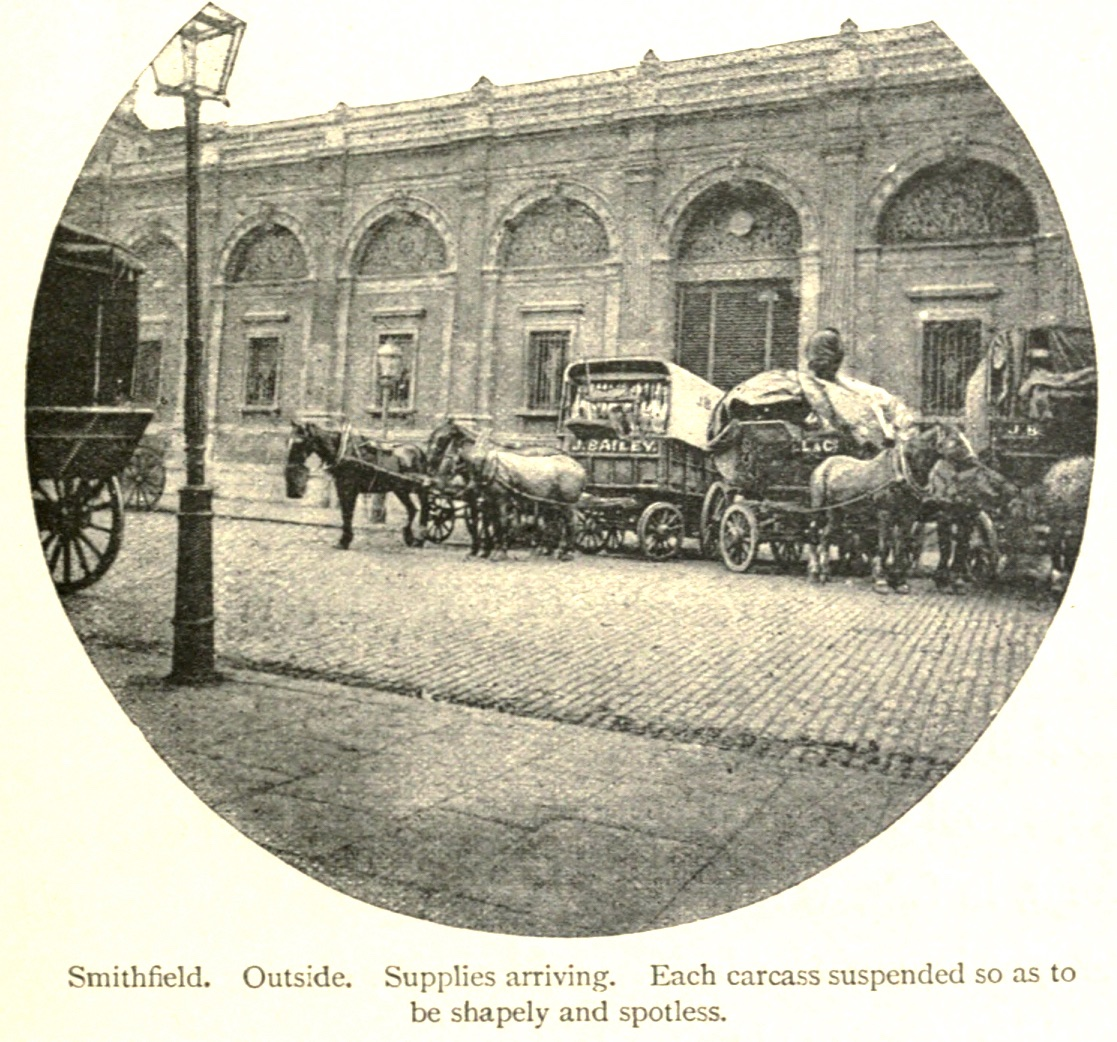
Smithfield Market in Samuel Plimsoll's day

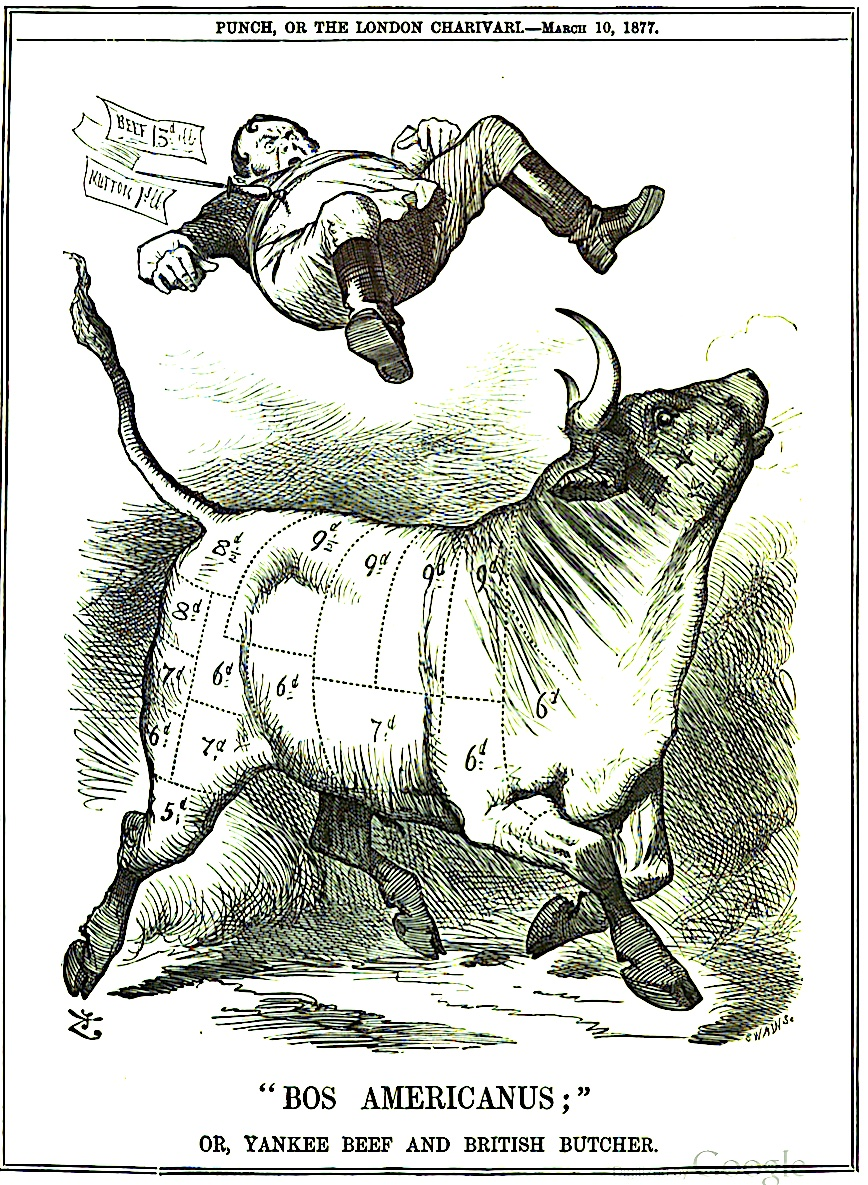
American competition gives profiteering British butchers a good tumbling — or so Punch hoped. Instead, cynical butchers bought the American meat and sold it as British.

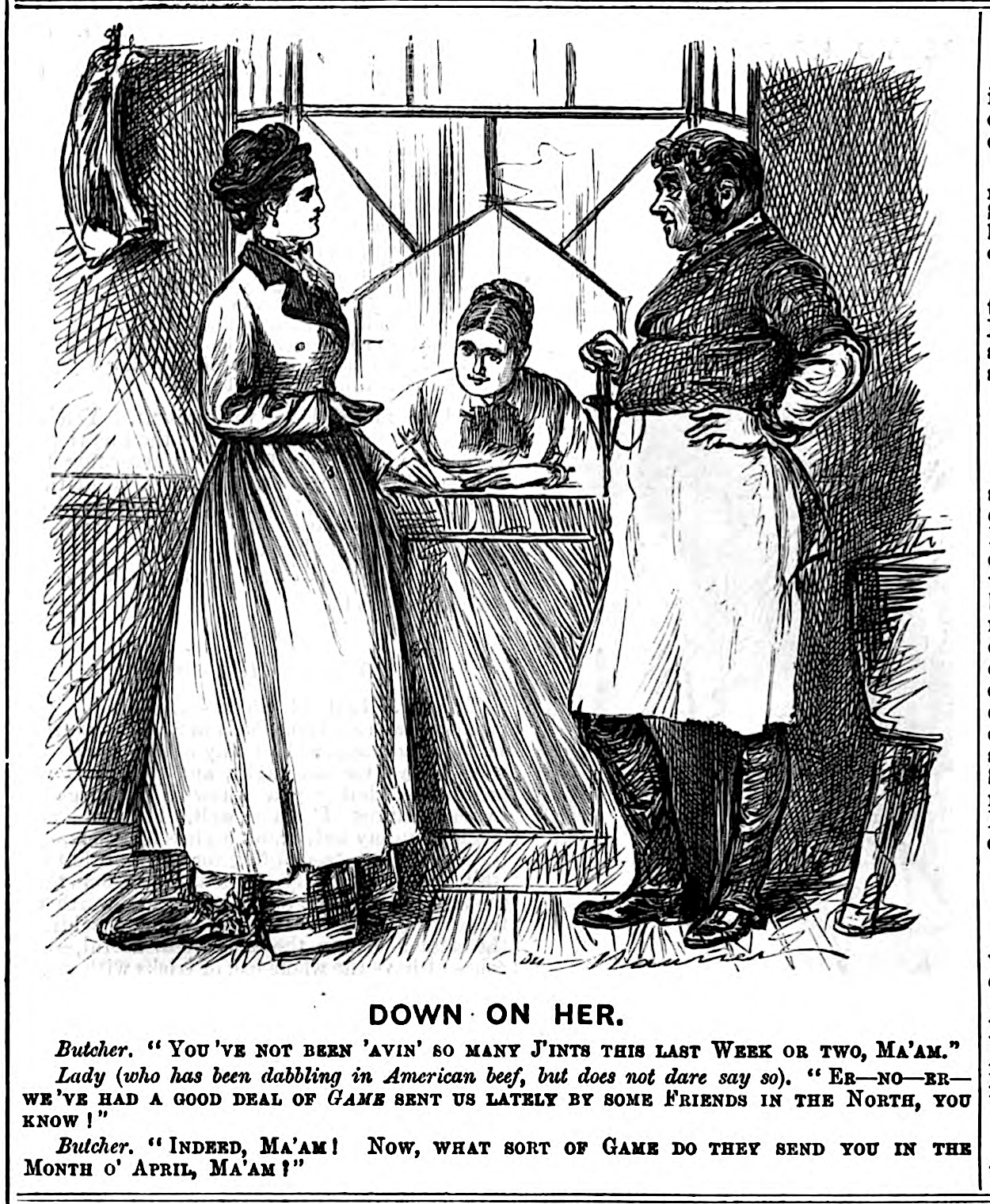
Social embarrassment. A lady is caught out buying American meat.

=== Why the price premium? ===
At Smithfield Market a wholesale quantity of Deptford-killed American beef sold for 10-15% more than the same weight of American chilled beef. Was this because it was thought to be better; or was it because it could be resold fraudulently — as Scotch or English beef? That was the question debated in the Victorian era. The British farming industry had no doubt: the butchers were cheating. The butchers riposted that the farmers were just trying to protect themselves against competition: customers were not really bothered and rarely asked if a joint was English or foreign.

As for palatability, Plimsoll argued that chilled meat (not be confused with frozen meat, an inferior product) was as good as, indeed was better than Deptford-killed beef. It was better because chilling and keeping were equivalent to well-hung meat. Cattle slaughtered at Deptford were tired, stressed and bruised from the journey.

=== Consumer prejudice ===
Another possible explanation was that conservative consumers were put off buying chilled meat because they were repelled by the idea of eating meat not recently killed. (It was said that the working classes strongly objected to what they called "dead" meat.)

What Victorian and Edwardian consumers really thought of chilled beef is difficult to tell: taste, prejudice and snobbery came into it. A writer to The Times said:

I know a family in this town of good position who after much anxious thought and weighing all the chances of being poisoned, &c, timorously resolved one day to try this American beef. Unfortunately, the servants heard of the great experiment. The joint, a fine one, was duly served; the family ate and liked it... But, would you believe it, Sir, not one of the four servants would touch it!

By the Edwardian era two authors said "the West-End folk are very large customers for chilled beef of the highest quality", which suggests it could be quite palatable.

However that may be, Plimsoll argued it was up to the customer to decide. She might be prejudiced, but if she was willing to pay more for British-grown beef, she was entitled to get the real thing.

=== Another theory ===
Richard Perren of Aberdeen University in a 1971 essay argued that the live meat trade survived because the chilled meat trade was riskier. A consignment, having arrived at the London docks, would not keep much longer and had to be sold at Smithfield promptly — even if the market was glutted. There was less urgency about disposing of the live beasts. However, Perren accepted that, once cold-storage was available at ports, chilled meat would keep for another 14 days after arrival; that livestock had to be slaughtered within 10 days of arrival; that the live animal trade was also risky; and that the chilled trade was the bigger of the two. He also acknowledged that some butchers fraudulently sold Deptford-killed meat as English, the price being higher.

=== Incentives to fraud ===
If fraud there was, it was easy to perpetrate: truly effective compulsory marking of origin was not introduced until 1933. It seems no prosecutions were attempted, and it could be argued the City of London itself encouraged the practice.

Plimsoll calculated that the fraud was worth a penny the pound of meat, or £4 per head of cattle (≝ £500_{2018}). A 2010 study found that

For all grades of beef, substantial incentives existed to misrepresent American beef as Scottish/English,

but the gains declined as time went by, and had ceased to exist by 1911. By then, Deptford Market's trade was fading away.

==== Examples ====
In the Victorian era it was reported that "foreign merino sheep are slaughtered at Deptford, sent to Cardiff, the hind quarters there cut off, sent to London again, and there sold as Welsh mutton". It is corroborated by reliable sources.

Scientific American said (1904):

The strong and abiding prejudice of the Englishman against either frozen or chilled meat, or imported meat of any sort if he knows it to be imported, can be overcome in only one way. Instead of carcasses chilled or frozen being brought, the live cattle are conveyed to an English port and at once taken ashore and slaughtered... even an expert would find it hard to tell the difference.

A writer for a Chicago livestock magazine in 1912 tried and failed to find any American meat for sale at Smithfield, though he knew hundreds of American cattle had recently been butchered at Deptford. At last a stallholder admitted their meat was being sold as English.

An English port medical officer, generally sympathetic to the live cattle trade, remarked on the disparity between port-killed wholesale prices and butchers' retail prices.

=== Unexpected benefit ===
Paradoxically, the transatlantic cattle trade made for cheaper bread. The reason was spotted by economic historian Knick Harley.

Vessels laden with cattle were too buoyant, and needed to be ballasted. An easy way to do it was to fill their deep holds with American grain. On some routes it was carried free — it was cheaper than buying ballast. Thus, inexpensive and abundant American wheat was conveyed to England for very low rates. Effectively, the beef eaters were subsidising the bread eaters.

== The end of the Foreign Cattle Market ==
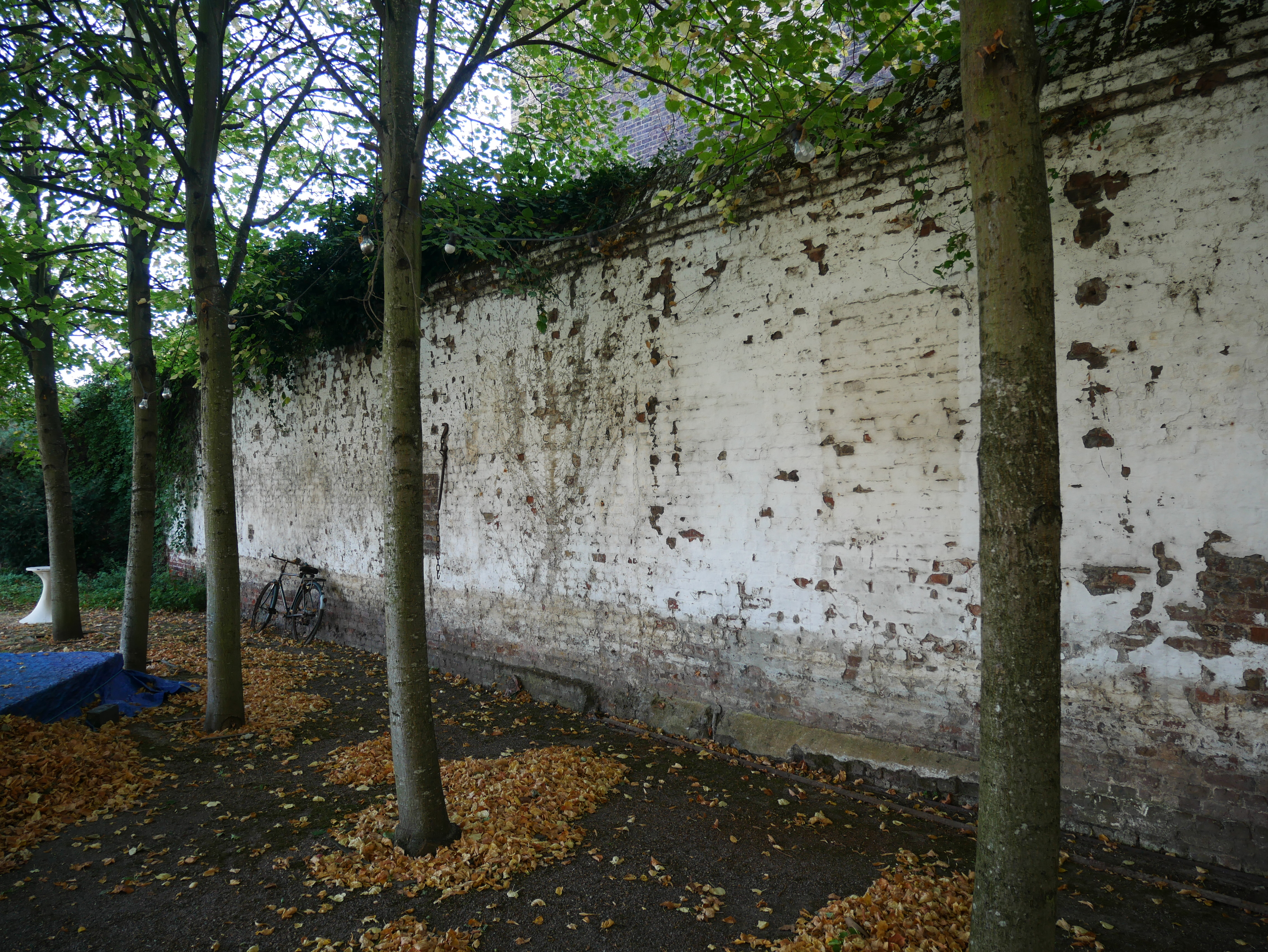
Remains. A boundary wall of the Foreign Cattle Market (and former dockyard) in 2020.

With the 1903 embargo on Argentine cattle, and diminishing American and Canadian supplies, the market went into a decline. In 1912 George Philcox died, borne to the grave by market employees: the City Press wrote that it was of a broken heart, caused by the decay of the market to which he had devoted his life. In 1913 the City of London decided to close it down.

At the outbreak of World War I the site was occupied by the War Office. It became a supply base, sending rations to the troops in France. After the war the City sold it to the government. In time the site became known as Convoys Wharf.

Some remains of the old Market (and former dockyard), such as boundary walls, were made listed buildings, and stand today.

== Sources ==
=== General ===
- Alsford, Niki J.P. (2021). "The City within the City: A Glimpse of Elite Formation in Deptford, London and Dadaocheng, Taipei" (PDF). Journal of Urban History. 47 (1): 111–135. doi:10.1177/0096144219868815. S2CID 202256638.
- Baxter, Arthur (1896). "Butchers and fishmongers". In Booth, Charles (ed.). Life and Labour of the People in London. London and New York: Macmillan.
- Bernier, D. (1903). "El puerto de Deptford". Boletín de Agricultura y Ganadería (in Spanish). Buenos Aires: Ministerio de Agricultura.
- Bicknell, Frank W. (1903). The Animal Industry of Argentina. Washington: U.S. Department of Agriculture.
- Bicknell, Frank W. (1904). Alfalfa and Beef Production in Argentina. Washington: U.S. Department of Agriculture.
- BMJ leader (1865). "The Cattle-Plague". The British Medical Journal. 2 (258): 611–613. JSTOR 25205194.
- Board of Agriculture (1891). "Agricultural Returns of Great Britain (Cd. 6524)". Agricultural Statistics. England and Wales. Part 2: Prices and Index Numbers of Agricultural Produce. London: Eyre and Spottiswoode.
- Board of Agriculture (1901). Agricultural Returns for Great Britain (Cd. 576). London: Wyman & Sons.
- Board of Agriculture and Fisheries (1906). "The Foreign Animals Order of 1903". Handbook for Great Britain of the Acts and the Orders made thereunder by the Board. HMSO.
- Board of Trade (1909). "Departmental Committee Report". In Federal Trade Commission (ed.). Report on the Meat-Packing Industry: Summary and Part I. Washington: FTC: 1919.
- Booth, Charles (1895). Butchers and Fishmongers. London: London School of Economics.
- Booth, Charles (1900). Notebook: Miscellaneous District 45 (Deptford). London: London School of Economics.
- Brayer, Herbert O. (1949). "The Influence of British Capital on the Western Range-Cattle Industry". The Journal of Economic History. 9 (Supplement: The Tasks of Economic History): 85–98. doi:10.1017/S002205070006407X. JSTOR 2113049. S2CID 153383241.
- Brown, G.T. (1873). "Report on the Contagious and Infectious Diseases of Animals referred to in the Contagious Diseases (Animals) Act, 1869 especially with respect to their degree of prevalence in 1872". Journal of the Royal Agricultural Society of England. IX (2nd ser.).
- Brown, G.T. (1879). Annual Report of the Veterinary Department of the Privy Council Office for the Year 1878 with an Appendix. London: Eyre and Spottiswoode.
- Bryden, Williamson (1891). "The Transatlantic Cattle Trade and its Regulations from a Veterinary Point of View". The Journal of Comparative Medicine and Veterinary Surgery and Archives. XII (10): 495–501.
- Capie, Forrest; Perren, Richard (1980). "The British Market for Meat 1850-1914". Agricultural History. 54 (4): 502–505. JSTOR 3742485.
- Chadwick, F.E.; et al. (1891). Ocean Steamships. New York: Charles Scribner's Sons.
- Clemen, Rudolph Alexander (1923). The American Livestock and Meat Industry. New York: The Ronald Press Company.
- Cotton, James Sutherland, ed. (1896). "Diseases of Animals Act, 1896". The Practical Statutes of the Session 1896. London: Horace Cox.
- Critchell, James Troubridge; Raymond, Joseph (1912). A History of the Frozen Meat Trade. London: Constable.
- Davies, W.H. (1908). The Autobiography of a Super-Tramp. London: A.C. Fifield.
- "Deptford Live-Stock Reports". The Farmer's Advocate. Vol. XLIV, no. 1. 10 June 1909. p. 974.
- Dickens, Charles (1867). "The Sinews of the Nation". All the Year Round. Vol. xix, no. 452. London: Chapman and Hall.
- Edwards-Callaway, Lily N.; Calvo-Lorenzo, Michelle S. (2020). "Animal welfare in the U.S. slaughter industry — a focus on fed cattle". Journal of Animal Science. 98 (4): 1–21. doi:10.1093/jas/skaa040. PMC 7134563. PMID 32026929.
- Evans, Simon M. (1979). "Canadian Beef for Victorian Britain". Agricultural History. 53 (4): 748–762. JSTOR 3742691.
- Evans, Simon M. (1983). "The Origin of Ranching in Western Canada: American Diffusion or Victorian Transplant?". Great Plains Quarterly. 3 (2): 79–90. JSTOR 24467610.
- Evans, Stewart P.; Skinner, Keith (2001). The Ultimate Jack the Ripper Sourcebook. London: Robinson. ISBN 978-1-84119-452-3.
- Fisher, J.R. (1980). "The Economic Effects of Cattle Disease in Britain and Its Containment, 1850-1900". Agricultural History. 54 (2): 278–294. JSTOR 3743046. PMID 11610809.
- Fisher, John R. (1998). "Cattle Plagues Past and Present: The Mystery of Mad Cow Disease". Journal of Contemporary History. 33 (2): 215–228. doi:10.1177/002200949803300202. JSTOR 260973. S2CID 161148001.
- Fritz, Henry E. (1972a). "The Cattlemen's Frontier in the Trans-Mississippi West: An Annotated Bibliography (Part I)". Arizona and the West. 14 (1): 45–70. JSTOR 40168001.
- Fritz, Henry E. (1972b). "The Cattlemen's Frontier in the Trans-Mississippi West: An Annotated Bibliography (Part II)". Arizona and the West. 14 (2): 169–190. JSTOR 40168071.
- Goding, Harry; Raub, A. Joseph (1918). The 28-Hour Law Regulating the Interstate Transportation of Live Stock: Its Purpose, Requirements, and Enforcement (USDA Bulletin No. 589). Washimgtonn: U.S. Department of Agriculture.
- Gordon, W.J. (1889). "The Feeding of London". The Leisure Hour. Vol. 38. London: Stevens.
- Grandin, Temple (1980). "Bruises and Carcass Damage". International Journal for the Study of Animal Problems. 1 (2).
- Grandin, T. (1997). "Assessment of stress during handling and transport" (PDF). Journal of Animal Science. 75 (1): 249–257. doi:10.2527/1997.751249x. hdl:10464/7165. PMID 9027573.
- Harley, C. Knick (2008). "Steers Afloat: The North Atlantic Meat Trade, Liner Predominance, and Freight Rates, 1870-1913". The Journal of Economic History. 68 (4): 1028–1058. doi:10.1017/S0022050708000806. JSTOR 40056468. S2CID 154761358.
- Haslam (1 August 1889). "The Haslam Refrigerated Machinery at the Foreign Cattle Market, Deptford". The British Trade Journal. Vol. XXVII. London.
- Higgins, David M. (2004). "'Mutton Dressed as Lamb'? The Misrepresentation of Australian and New Zealand Meat in the British Market c.1890-1914". Australian Economic History Review. 44 (2): 161–184. doi:10.1111/j.1467-8446.2004.00115.x. ISSN 0004-8992.
- Higgins, David M.; Gangjee, Dev (2010). "'Trick or Treat?' The Misrepresentation of American Beef Exports in Britain during the Late Nineteenth Century". Enterprise & Society. 11 (2): 203–241. doi:10.1017/S1467222700009046. JSTOR 23701293. S2CID 155046313.
- Howard, James (1876). "Our Meat Supply". Farmer's Magazine. LXXIX (3): 155–165.
- Husband, Peter M. (1993). "Carcass Chilling — Principles". MLA Meat & Livestock Australia.
- Huttman, John P. (1978). "British Meat Imports in the Free Trade Era". Agricultural History. 52 (2): 247–262. JSTOR 3742922.
- J.E.P. (20 March 1912). "The World's Greatest Meat Market". Breeder's Gazette. Vol. LXI, no. 12. Chicago: Sanders Publishing.
- Kelly (1891). Post Office London Directory. Vol. III Trades. London: Kelly & Co.
- Loring, Nele (1891). "Five Thousand Miles With Range-Cattle". In Knowles, James (ed.). The Nineteenth Century. Vol. XXIX. London: Kegan Paul, Trench, Trübner. pp. 48 v.
- Lyman, Charles P. (1881). "Contagious Pleuro-pneumonia". Contagious Diseases of Domesticated Animals. Washington DC: Department of Agriculture.
- MacDonald, James (1878). Food from the Far West, or American Agriculture. Edinburgh and London: William P. Nimmo.
- MacLachlan, Ian (2008). "Humanitarian Reform, Slaughter Technology, and Butcher Resistance in Nineteenth-Century Britain". In Young Lee, Paula (ed.). Meat, Modernity and the Rise of the Slaughterhouse. University Press of New England. ISBN 978-1-58465-698-2.
- Melvin, A.D.; Rommel, George M. (1915). Meat Production in the Argentine and its Effect upon the Industry in the United States. Washington DC: Department of Agriculture. Archived from the original on 4 September 2022.
- Miller, Cyrus C. (1916). "Municipal Terminal Markets". Journal of the National Institute of Social Sciences. II: 140–154.
- Moore, S.G. (1895). "On the Atlantic Cattle Trade". Journal of the Sanitary Institute. XVI: 49–54.
- Nelson, E. Montague (1895). "The Meat Supply of the United Kingdom". Journal of the Society for Arts. 43 (2208): 420–429. JSTOR 41334185.
- Obituary (1909). "George Joseph Cooper, M.R.C.S., L.S.A., M.P. For Bermondsey". The British Medical Journal. 2 (2546): 1200. doi:10.1136/bmj.2.2546.1200. JSTOR 25283984. PMC 2321873. S2CID 220150583.
- Oliphant, J. Orin (1946). "The Eastward Movement of Cattle from the Oregon Country". Agricultural History. 20 (1): 19–43. JSTOR 3739347.
- Our London Meat Trade (1895). "The "Echua" Shipment". The Australasian Pastoralists' Review.
- Paterson, W., ed. (1869). The Practical Statutes of the Session 1869. London: Horace Cox.
- Paxson, Frederic L. (1916). "The Cow Country". The American Historical Review. 22 (1): 65–82. doi:10.2307/1836196. JSTOR 1836196.
- Peet, Richard (1972). "Influences of the British Market on Agriculture and Related Economic Development in Europe before 1860". Transactions of the Institute of British Geographers. 56 (56): 1–20. doi:10.2307/621539. JSTOR 621539.
- Perren, Richard (1971). "The North American Beef and Cattle Trade with Great Britain, 1870-1914". The Economic History Review. 24 (3): 430–444. doi:10.2307/2594053. JSTOR 2594053.
- Perren, Richard (1975). "The Meat and Livestock Trade in Britain, 1850-70". The Economic History Review. 2 (3): 385–400. doi:10.2307/2593589. JSTOR 2593589.
- Perren, Richard (2017). Taste, Trade and Technology: the Development of the International Meat Industry Since 1840. Abingdon, Oxon; New York: Routledge. ISBN 978-0-7546-3648-9.
- Perry, Edward E. (1885). "Live Stock and Meat Traffic of Chicago". Annual Report of the Bureau of Animal Industry for the Year 1884. Vol. 1. Washington: U.S. Department of Agriculture.
- Plimsoll, Samuel (1890). Cattle Ships: being the fifth chapter of Mr Plimsoll's second appeal for our Seamen. London: Kegan Paul, Trench, Trûbner & Co.
- Post, Lauren C. (1959). "Cattle Breeds, an Aspect of Regional Geography". Yearbook of the Association of Pacific Coast Geographers. 21: 51–58. doi:10.1353/pcg.1959.0002. JSTOR 24042261. S2CID 128946251.
- Princess Alice, Countess of Athlone (2 March 1978). "Out of the Air". The Listener. Vol. 99, no. 2549.
- Royal Commission on Market Rights and Tolls (1888). "Evidence of George Philcox". First Report. Vol. II. London: HMSO.
- Rutherford, J.G. (1909). The Cattle Trade of Western : Special Report. Ottawa: Dominion of Canada Department of Agriculture.
- Select Committee on Cattle Plague (1877). "Report". Reports from Committees. London: House of Commons.
- Sinclair, James M. (1895). Report on the Live Stock and Frozen Meat Production of the Argentine Republic. Melbourne: Department of Agriculture, Victoria.
- "Smithfield Cattle Market". Farmer's Magazine. Vol. 19 (2nd series). London. 1849.
- Stanton, Edgar (1887). "Addenda to Russian Cattle Reports". United States Consular Reports: Cattle and Dairy Farming. Vol. Part II. Washington: Department of State.
- Stanton, G. Smith (1910). 'When the Wildwood was in Flower': Covering the Fifteen years' Experiences of a New Yorker on the Western Plains. New York: J.S. Ogilvie.
- Sullivan, J.W. (1913). Markets for the people : the consumer's part. New York: Macmillan Co.
- "The Exportation of Cattle". Scientific American. Vol. XLIII. New York: Munn & Co. 1880. pp. 217–8.
- "The Transatlantic Cattle Trade". The Nautical Magazine and Journal of the Royal Naval Reserve. Vol. IX, no. VII. 1891.
- Turner, George T. (1878). Cattle Traffic and Cattle Diseases: an Appeal to the Public. London: James Odams.
- Van Engen, N.K.; Coetzee, J.F. (2018). "Effects of transportation on cattle health and production: a review". Animal Health Research Reviews. 19 (2): 1–13. doi:10.1017/S1466252318000075. PMID 30460889. S2CID 206331845.
- Walford, Edward (1878). "Deptford". Old and New London. Vol. 6. London: Cassell, Petter and Galpin/British History Online.
- Wallace, Robert; Watson, J.A. Scott (1923). Farm Live Stock of Great Britain. Edinburgh and London: Oliver and Boyd.
- White, John H. (1990). "Riding in Style: Palace Cars for the Cattle Trade". Technology and Culture. 31 (2): 265–270. doi:10.2307/3105661. JSTOR 3105661. S2CID 111527890.
- Williams, Montagu (1891). Later Leaves. London and New York: Macmillan.
- Wood, Charles (2020). "Purebreds Move West: The 1890s". The Kansas Beef Industry. University Press of Kansas. pp. 25–42. doi:10.2307/j.ctv1p2gk2h.7. ISBN 9780700601974. JSTOR j.ctv1p2gk2h.7.
- Wood, Walter (1904). "Atlantic Cattle-Carrying". Scientific American Supplement. Vol. LVIII. New York: Munn & Co.
- Wynne, Robert J. "London". Municipal Markets and Slaughterhouses in Europe (Special Consular Reports — Volume XLII — Part III). Washington: Department of Commerce and Labor, Bureau of Manufacturers. pp. 86 v.
- Zimmerman, Wm. David (1962). "Live Cattle Export Trade between United States and Great Britain, 1868-1885". Agricultural History. 36 (1): 46–52. JSTOR 3740397.

=== Newspapers ===
- "The Foreign Cattle Market". The Times. 8 November 1870. p. 6.
- "The Foreign Cattle-Market at Deptford". London City Press. 29 July 1871. p. 5.
- "The New Foreign Cattle Market". The Times. 13 December 1871. p. 4.
- "Our Food". The Times. 16 September 1879. p. 6.
- "American Meat Production". The Times. 6 April 1880. p. 4., content reprinted in The Farmer's Magazine retrieved 5 September 2022.
- "Deptford Foreign Cattle Market". The Times. 26 March 1884. p. 5.
- Frewen, Moreton (25 July 1885). "American Competition". The Times. p. 6.
- "The Exclusion of Live Animals Coming from Germany". The Times. 16 November 1889. p. 12.
- "The Importation of Foreign Cattle". Morning Post. 24 February 1897. p. 5.
- "Women in Deptford Cattle Market". Daily Telegraph. 12 July 1897. p. 8.
- "Court of Common Council". The Times. 30 July 1897. p. 8.
- "The Duchess of Albany and Deptford Girls". Daily Telegraph. 11 September 1898. p. 5.
- "London's Meat Supplies". Daily Telegraph. 1 February 1907. p. 7.
- "The Beef Trust". Westminster Gazette. 4 December 1907. p. 8.
- "Deptford Cattle Market and the Shortage of Imports". Kentish Mercury. 1 July 1908. p. 3.
- "More About the Beef Trust". Woolwich Herald. 24 July 1908. p. 4.
- "Funeral of Mr George Philcox". West Kent Argus. 19 March 1912. p. 5.
- "Deptford Foreign Cattle Market". The Times. 6 August 1912. p. 11.
- "Failure of the Foreign Cattle Market". The Times. 4 April 1913. p. 12.
- "Deptford Cattle Market; Its Decaying Industry". Brockley News, New Cross and Hatcham Review. 10 April 1914. p. 6.
- "Deptford Cattle Market". Freeman's Journal. 17 March 1924. p. 2.
- "Sale of Deptford Market". The Times. 13 March 1926. p. 12.
- Kingston, Jeremy (19 November 1988). "The Gut Girls". The Times. p. 33.

=== Purchasing power ===
Where historic money values have been re-expressed in £ of 2018 purchasing power (e.g. £1,234_{2018}) they been estimated with this tool:

- "Inflation Calculator". Bank of England.
