= Vansittart =

Vansittart is a surname of Dutch origin that originated in the city of Sittard in Limburg. A rich mercantile branch of the Dutch family that settled at Shottesbrooke, in Berkshire, England, included several members who were prominent in British politics.

Notable people with the surname include:

- Augustus Arthur Vansittart (1824–1882), English scholar
- Cyril Vansittart (1852–1887), English-Italian chess player
- Edward Vansittart Neale (1810–1892), English barrister
- George Henry Vansittart (1768–1824), British army general
- George Vansittart (1745–1825), British politician
- Henrietta Vansittart (1833–1883), English engineer and inventor
- Henry Vansittart (1732–1770), English diplomat and Governor of Bengal
- Nicholas Vansittart, 1st Baron Bexley (1766–1851), English politician
- Peter Vansittart (1920–2008), English writer
- Robert Vansittart (judge) (1728–1789), English jurist
- Robert Vansittart, 1st Baron Vansittart (1881–1957), English diplomat
- Rupert Vansittart (born 1958), English actor
- Sir Vansittart Bowater, 1st Baronet (1862–1938), English politician
- Tom Vansittart (born 1950), English retired footballer
- William Vansittart (1813–1878), British politician
- William Vansittart Bowater (1838–1907), English businessman
- Alice Vansittart Comyns Carr (1850–1927), British costume designer associated with the Aesthetic dress movement
- Alma Gertrude Vansittart Strettell, (1853–1939), British translator and poet

== See also ==
- Vansittart (ship)
- Vansittart (1814 ship), launched at New York in 1807, under another name
- HMS Vansittart (D64), Admiralty modified W class destroyer of the Royal Navy
- Vansittart (East Indiaman)
- Vansittart Bay, Western Australia
- Vansittart Island (Nunavut), uninhabited Canadian arctic island
- Vansittart Island (Tasmania), island in Australia
