= Eveline Lowe =

British politician (1869–1956)

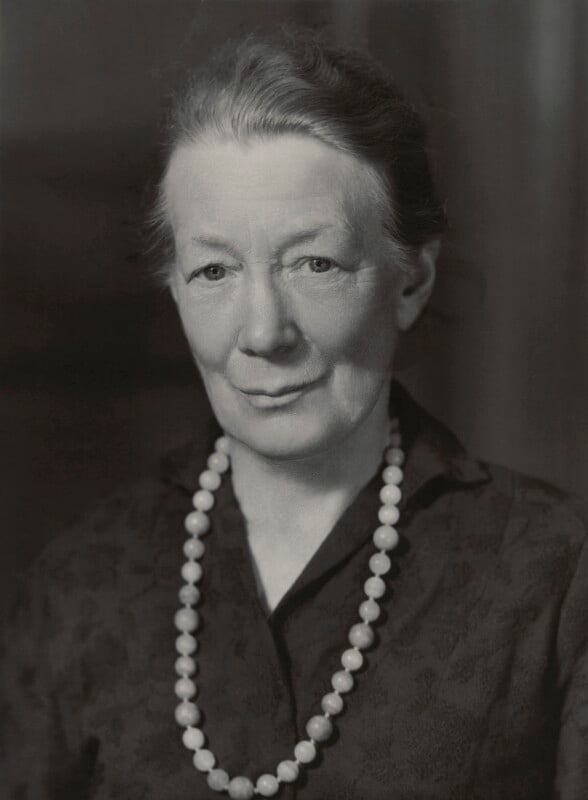
Lowe in 1938

Eveline Mary Lowe (29 November 1869 – 30 May 1956) was a British politician who served as Chair of the London County Council from 1939 to 1940.

Born in Rotherhithe as Eveline Farren, she attended Milton Mount College and then Homerton College, where she qualified as a teacher. She then began teaching at the college, becoming its vice-principal in 1894 and relocating with the institution to Cambridge. In 1903, she married George Carter Lowe, and left teaching. The two moved to Bermondsey, where George joined the medical practice run by Alfred Salter. Along with Alfred and Ada Salter, Lowe founded a Bermondsey branch of the Independent Labour Party (ILP), and she was soon elected to the local Board of Guardians.

George died in 1919, and Lowe decided to devote her life to political activity. She was co-opted to the London County Council education committee, and in 1922 she was elected to the council, representing Bermondsey West. She served as deputy chair of the council in 1929/30.

Lowe remained a member of the ILP, but she resigned in 1932 as she did not support its disaffiliation from the Labour Party. From 1934 to 1937, she chaired the council's education committee, then chaired its establishment committee until 1939. She then served for a year as chair of the council, the first woman to hold the post. She retired in 1946, and was awarded an honorary Doctor of Laws degree by the University of London in 1950.

Civic offices
Preceded by Ewart Culpin	Chair of the London County Council; 1939–1940	Succeeded by Albert Emil Davies
