= Bermondsey West (London County Council constituency) =

London County Council constituency

- Former constituency for the London County Council

Former constituency
- Created: 1919
- Abolished: 1949
- Member(s): 2
- Created from: Bermondsey; Rotherhithe
- Replaced by: Bermondsey

Bermondsey West was a constituency used for elections to the London County Council between 1919 and 1949. The seat shared boundaries with the UK Parliament constituency of the same name.

== Councillors ==
Year	Name	Party	Name	Party
1919	Harold Glanville	Progressive	Montague Shearman	Progressive
1922	Frederick Charles Langton	Labour	Eveline Lowe	Labour
1925	Benjamin Embleton	Labour	Eveline Lowe	Labour
1928	Ada Salter	Labour	Eveline Lowe	Labour
1941	Leslie Davison	Labour	Eveline Lowe	Labour
1944	Edward Snowdon	Labour	Eveline Lowe	Labour
1946	Edward Snowdon	Labour	Reg Goodwin	Labour

== Election results ==
1919 London County Council election: Bermondsey West
Party	Candidate	Votes	%	±%
Progressive	Harold Glanville	2,214	28.5	
Progressive	Montague Shearman	1,619	20.9	
Labour	Alfred Salter	1,464	18.9	
Independent	William Shearring	1,420	18.3	
Labour	Charles Gibson	1,046	13.5	
Majority		155	2.0	
Progressive hold		Swing		
Progressive hold		Swing		

1922 London County Council election: Bermondsey West
Party	Candidate	Votes	%	±%
Labour	Eveline Lowe	4,113		
Labour	Frederick Charles Langton	4,091		
Progressive	Harold Glanville	3,277		
Progressive	Samuel Lithgow	2,671		
Independent Liberal	Jessie Scriven	2,339		
Majority				
Labour gain from Progressive		Swing		
Labour gain from Progressive		Swing		

1925 London County Council election: Bermondsey West
Party	Candidate	Votes	%	±%
Labour	Eveline Lowe	5,222		
Labour	Benjamin Embleton	5,060		
Progressive	William Sherring	2,131		
Progressive	A. J. Jeffrey	2,045		
Majority				
Labour hold		Swing		
Labour hold		Swing		

1928 London County Council election: Bermondsey West
Party	Candidate	Votes	%	±%
Labour	Ada Salter	6,523		
Labour	Eveline Lowe	6,415		
Municipal Reform	W. F. Baker	1,683		
Municipal Reform	Sophia Jevons	1,671		
Liberal	A. J. Cook	1,625		
Liberal	William Freeman	1,591		
Majority				
Labour hold		Swing		
Labour hold		Swing		

1931 London County Council election: Bermondsey West
Party	Candidate	Votes	%	±%
Labour	Ada Salter	4,735		
Labour	Eveline Lowe	4,672		
Municipal Reform	W. A. Phillips	2,216		
Municipal Reform	Sophia Jevons	2,200		
Majority				
Labour hold		Swing		
Labour hold		Swing		

1934 London County Council election: Bermondsey West
Party	Candidate	Votes	%	±%
Labour	Ada Salter	7,324		
Labour	Eveline Lowe	7,217		
Municipal Reform	William Edward Agg-Large	1,967		
Municipal Reform	G. Whitehead	1,933		
Majority				
Labour hold		Swing		
Labour hold		Swing		

1937 London County Council election: Bermondsey West
Party	Candidate	Votes	%	±%
Labour	Ada Salter	7,735		
Labour	Eveline Lowe	7,493		
Municipal Reform	Derek Hall-Caine	2,599		
Municipal Reform	A. H. Gorman	2,570		
Majority				
Labour hold		Swing		
Labour hold		Swing		

1946 London County Council election: Bermondsey West
Party	Candidate	Votes	%	±%
Labour	Reg Goodwin	2,503		
Labour	Edward Snowdon	2,486		
National Liberal	W. B. Pemberton	673		
National Liberal	A. J. Jeffreys	655		
Majority				
Labour hold		Swing		
Labour hold		Swing		
