= List of chairmen of the London County Council =

This is a list of persons who held the offices of chairman, vice chairman and deputy chairman of the London County Council. All three offices existed from 1889 to 1965.

== Background ==
The chairmanship and vice chairmanship were statutory offices created by the Local Government Act 1888. Both of these positions were generally filled by members of the majority party. The chairman chaired meetings of the council, and was the county's civic leader, filling a similar role to the mayor of a borough or city. The vice chairman performed these functions in his or her absence.

As part of the celebrations of the silver jubilee of George V in 1935 it was announced that the chairman would in future be entitled to use the style "right honourable", an honour already enjoyed by the Lord Mayor of London.

The council's standing orders also provided for the post of deputy chairman. This was initially a salaried position created to supervise the administration of the local authority. In 1894 the Royal Commission on the Amalgamation of the City and County of London strongly recommended that a clerk be appointed, independent of the parties on the council, as was the practice in municipal boroughs. A county clerk was duly appointed in 1895, and the deputy chairmanship became ceremonial. The office was filled by nominees of the opposition party on the council.

On 1 April 1965 the London County Council was abolished, with its successor authority being the Greater London Council.

=== Regalia ===
The chairman had no badge of office until 1927. In 1909 the council had decided that no badge or device should be worn by the chairman. By 1926 the number of formal occasions attended by the chairman had increased, and it was felt that he was at a distinct disadvantage due to not having a distinguishing mark to indicate his office. In 1927 Major Lewis-Barned, councillor for South Paddington, agreed to cover the cost of a badge. The badge was made by an instructor at the Central School of Arts and Crafts and featured the council's coat of arms within an oval of London Pride. The badge was worn on a ribbon in a distinctive barry wavy argent and azure pattern derived from the arms. In 1950 similar, but smaller, badges were acquired for the use of the vice and deputy chairmen.

== 1889–1899 ==
William Collins

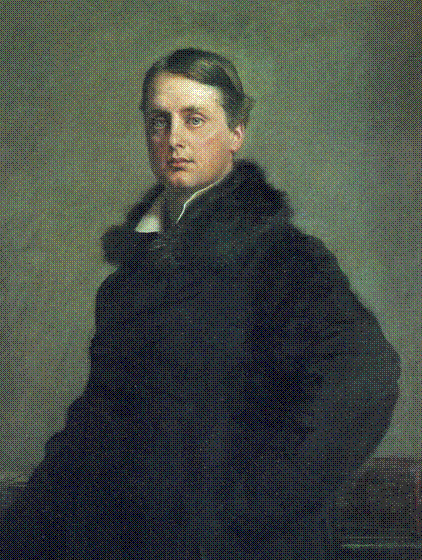
Lord Rosebery

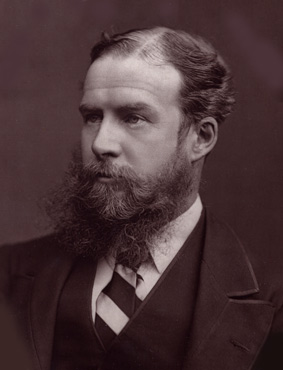
John Lubbock

Thomas McKinnon Wood

Civic year	Chairman	Vice chairman	Deputy chairman
1889	Earl of Rosebery	Sir John Lubbock	Joseph Firth Bottomley Firth (Died September 1889); Office vacant September – November 1889
1889–1890	Earl of Rosebery^{[note a]} Sir John Lubbock (July 1890)	Sir John Lubbock^{[note a]} Thomas Farrer	Alfred H Haggis
1890–1891	Sir John Lubbock	Thomas Farrer	Alfred Haggis (Died November 1891); Office vacant November 1891 – March 1892
1891–1892^{[note b]}	Sir John Lubbock	Thomas Farrer	Alfred Haggis (Died November 1891); Office vacant November 1891 – March 1892
1892–1893	Earl of Rosebery^{[note c]} John Hutton (July 1892)	John Hutton^{[note c]} Charles Harrison (July 1892)	Willoughby Dickinson
1893–1894	John Hutton	Charles Harrison	Willoughby Dickinson
1894–1895	Sir John Hutton^{[note d]}	Charles Harrison	Willoughby Dickinson
1895–1896	Sir Arthur Arnold	John Benn	Willoughby Dickinson
1896–1897	Sir Arthur Arnold	Dr William Job Collins	Melvill Beachcroft
1897–1898	Dr William Job Collins	Melvill Beachcroft	Andrew Mitchell Torrance
1898–1899	Thomas McKinnon Wood	Lord Welby	Henry Percy Harris

- Note a: The Earl of Rosebery resigned, and the vice chairman, Sir John Lubbock was elected in his place in July 1890. The vice chairmanship then became vacant, being eventually filled by Sir Thomas Farrer.
- Note b: The three office holders all made clear their intention to resign at the end of October 1891. However, following unanimous representations from the members of the council, all agreed to continue until the next elections in March 1892. Therefore, no elections to the offices were made in 1891.
- Note c: Rosebery resigned as chairman in the Summer of 1892, becoming Foreign Secretary in the Fourth Gladstone Ministry. Hutton was elected chairman and Harrison replaced him as Vice Chairman.
- Note d: Knighted in 1894.

== 1899–1909 ==
W. H. Dickinson

John Benn

A. M. Torrance

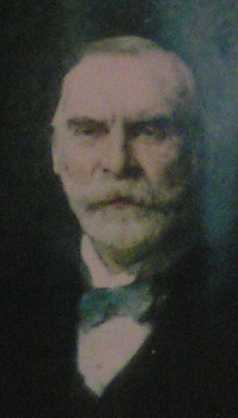
R. A Robinson

E. A. Cornwall

Civic year	Chairman	Vice chairman	Deputy chairman
1899–1900	Lord Welby	Richard Strong	Thomas Lorimer Corbett
1900–1901	Willoughby Dickinson	Andrew Mitchell Torrance	John Fletcher
1901–1902	Andrew Mitchell Torrance	John McDougall	Arthur Rotton
1902–1903	John McDougall^{[note e]}	Lord Monkswell	Henry Clarke
1903–1904	Lord Monkswell	Edwin Cornwall	Richard Atkinson Robinson
1904–1905	John Benn	Edwin Cornwall	Frederick Prat Alliston
1905–1906	Edwin Cornwall	Evan Spicer	Clifford Probyn
1906–1907	Evan Spicer	Henry Ward	Elijah Baxter Forman
1907–1908	Henry Percy Harris	Herbert Stuart Sankey	Fitzroy Hemphill
1908–1909	Richard Atkinson Robinson	William Whitaker Thompson	Arthur Acland Allen

- Note e: Knighted on 24 October 1902. The award was part of the coronation honours of Edward VII, and was announced on 26 June 1902.

== 1909–1919 ==
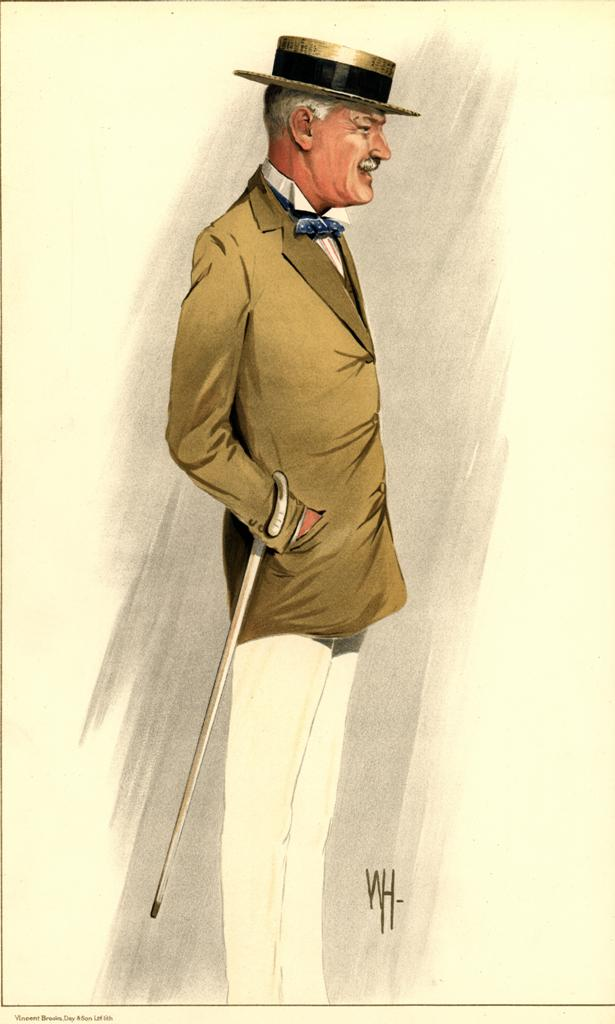
Lord Cheylesmore, chairman 1912 – 1913

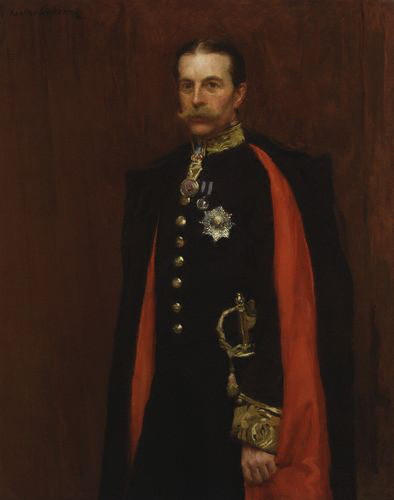
Lord Crewe, chairman 1917 – 1918

Civic year	Chairman	Vice chairman	Deputy chairman
1909–1910	Sir Melvill Beachcroft	Edward White	Edward Smith
1910–1911	William Whitaker Thompson	Cyril Cobb	Alfred James Shepheard
1911–1912	Edward White ^{[note f]}	Cyril Jackson^{[note g]} Captain G S C Swinton (1912)	Arthur B Russell
1912–1913	George Swinton^{[note h]} Lord Cheylesmore (April 1912)	John Herbert Hunter	Harry Gosling
1913–1914	Cyril Cobb	Philip Pilditch	William Cowlishaw Johnson
1914–1915	Viscount Peel	Alfred Ordway Goodrich	H. E. A. Cotton
1915–1916	Cyril Jackson	Ernest Gray	Percy Harris
1916–1917	Alfred Fowell Buxton	William James Squires	Henry Herman Gordon
1917–1918	Marquess of Crewe^{[note i]}	John Gilbert	Thomas Frederick Hobson
1918–1919	Ronald Collet Norman	Cecil Urquhart Fisher	Katharine Wallas

- Note f: Knighted on 9 March 1912 "on the occasion of the laying of the foundation stone of the new London County Hall"
- Note g: Jackson resigned from the post of vice chairman in January 1912 on becoming leader of the Municipal Reform Party, and Swinton was elected in his place.
- Note h: Swinton was elected at the statutory meeting of the council on 12 March, and accepted office, but informed the council that he would only be holding the office for a few weeks, as he was leaving for India. Lord Cheylesmore was elected to the chair in his place on 2 April 1912.
- Note i: In 1917 the two parties on the council agreed a power-sharing deal for the duration of the war, and jointly nominated the Marquess of Crewe, who was Lord Lieutenant of the County of London to be non-partisan chairman.

== 1919–1929 ==
George Hume

Civic year	Chairman	Vice chairman	Deputy chairman
1919–1920	Lord Downham	Andrew Thomas Taylor	Thomas Gautrey
1920–1921	John Gilbert^{[note j]}	Jessie Wilton Phipps	George Masterman Gillett
1921–1922	Percy Simmons^{[note k]}	Francis Robert Ince Anderton	Howell Williams
1922–1923	Francis Robert Ince Anderton	Henry Cubitt Gooch	Henrietta Adler
1923–1924	Henry Cubitt Gooch	Henry Vincent Rowe	Earl of Haddo
1924–1925	John Herbert Hunter	Isidore Salmon	Henry Mills
1925–1926	Oscar Emanuel Warburg^{[note l]}	John Burgess Preston Karslake	Susan Lawrence
1926–1927	George Hume	William Hunt	Emil Davies
1927–1928	John Maria Gatti	Geoffrey Head	Edward Cruse
1928–1929	Cecil Levita^{[note m]}	Frederick Lionel Dove	John Speakman

- Note j: Gilbert was knighted at the end of his term of office in 1921.
- Note k: Simmons was knighted at the end of his term of office in 1922.
- Note l: Warburg was knighted on 5 February 1926
- Note m: Levita was knighted in 1929

== 1929–1939 ==
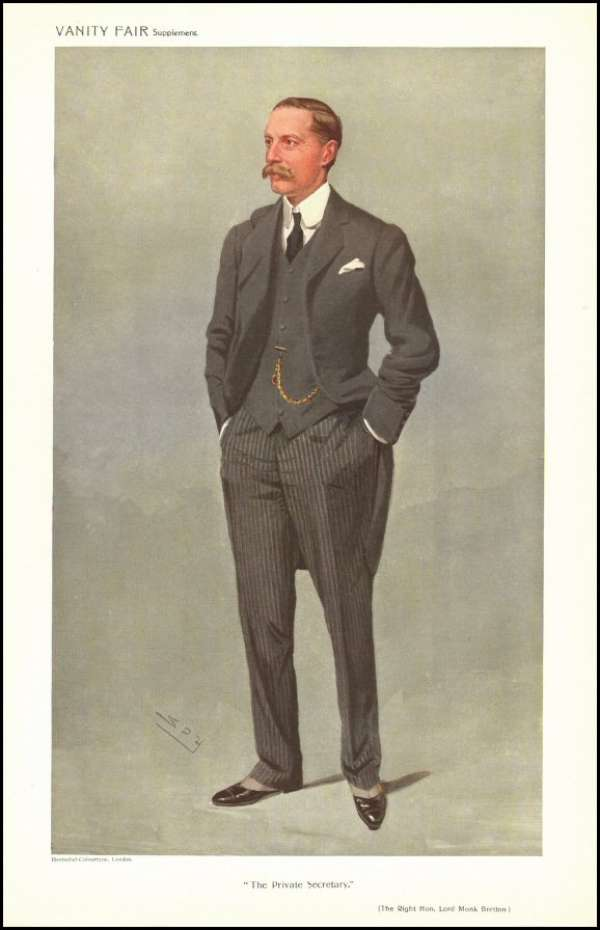
Monk Bretton in 1909, 20 years before he was chairman.

Civic year	Chairman	Vice chairman	Deputy chairman
1929–1930	Lord Monk Bretton	Ernest Sanger	Eveline Lowe
1930–1931	Robert Tasker^{[note n]}	Thomas Clarence Edward Goff	Alfred Baker
1931–1932	Ernest Sanger	Ernest Dence	Cecil Manning
1932–1933	Angus Scott	Beatrix Lyall	Agnes Dawson
1933–1934	Ernest Dence	Cyril Jacobs	Anna Mathew
1934–1935	Lord Snell^{[note p]}	Ewart Culpin	Charles Allpass
1935–1936	Lord Snell	Ewart Culpin	William Wilson Grantham
1936–1937	Lord Snell	Ewart Culpin	Robert Taylor
1937–1938	Lord Snell	Emil Davies	Frederic Bertram Galer
1938–1939	Ewart Culpin	John Speakman	Gervas Pierrepont

- Note n: Knighted on 24 February 1931
- Note p: Lord Snell was brought in from outside the council on the Labour Party taking power for the first time in 1934.

== 1939–1949 ==
Civic year	Chairman	Vice chairman	Deputy chairman
1939–1940	Eveline Lowe	Richard Coppock	Samuel Gluckstein
1940–1941	Albert Emil Davies	Henry Berry	Frank Stanley Henwood
1941–1942	Charles Ammon	Charles Gibson	Edgar John Sainsbury
1942–1943	J. P. Blake	Ada Gray	Walter Clifford Northcott
1943–1944	Alfred Baker^{[note q]} Richard Coppock (May 1943)	Reginald H. Pott	Eric Hall
1944–1945	Somerville Hastings	Thomas Henry Jones	Edward Martin
1945–1946	Charles Robertson	Ethel Maud Newman	Frederick William Dean
1946–1947	John Cliff	Harry Smith	Frank Gibbs Rye
1947–1948	Eleanor Nathan	Ernest Sherwood	John Martin Oakey
1948–1949	Walter Richard Owen	Frank Lawrence Combes^{[note r]} Fred Powe (October 1948)	William Reed Hornby Steer

- Note q: Baker died 2 April 1943. Coppock was elected chairman on 18 May 1943.
- Note r: Combes died 26 September 1948. Powe was elected in his place on 5 October 1948.

== 1949–1959 ==
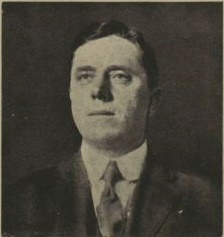
Bowen in 1920, 29 years before becoming chairman

Civic year	Chairman	Vice chairman	Deputy chairman
1949–1950	John William Bowen	Bernard Sullivan	Charles Pearce
1950–1951	John William Bowen	Helen Bentwich	A W Scott
1951–1952	John William Bowen	Richard Sargood	Norah Runge
1952–1953	Edwin Bayliss	Douglas Prichard	Francis William Beech
1953–1954	Arthur Edward Middleton ^{[note s]} Molly Bolton (November 1953) ^{[note a]}	Molly Bolton ^{[note s]} Frank Banfield (November 1953) ^{[note a]}	Frederick Lawrence
1954–1955	Victor Mishcon	Jack Oldfield	Alfred Edward Reneson Coucher
1955–1956	Norman Prichard	Ethel Rankin	George Rowland Durston Bradfield
1956–1957	Helen Bentwich	J. O'Neill Ryan	Elizabeth Evelyn Pepler
1957–1958	Ronald McKinnon Wood	Leonard Browne	Margery Thornton
1958–1959	Albert Samuels	Eleanor Goodrich	Cecilia Petrie

- Note s: Middleton was knighted on 6 July 1953 when Elizabeth II visited County Hall as part of the coronation celebrations. He died on 19 October 1953. On 2 November 1953 Bolton was elected chairman in his place, and her place as vice chairman was filled by Banfield.

== 1959–1965 ==
Civic year	Chairman	Vice chairman	Deputy chairman
1959–1960	Sidney Barton	Edward Woods	Samuel Isidore Salmon
1960–1961	Florence Cayford	John Keen	Norman Farmer
1961–1962	Harold Shearman	Edward Avery	Randolph Joseph Cleaver
1962–1963	Olive Deer	Herbert James Lowton Lygoe	Eileen Hoare
1963–1964	Reginald Stamp ^{[note t]} Arthur Wicks (October 1963) ^{[note t]}	Arthur Wicks; Henry Stillman (October 1963) ^{[note t]}	Unity Lister
1964–1965	Arthur Wicks	Henry Stillman	Frank Abbott

Note t: Stamp resigned unexpectedly on 5 October 1963 when he came under investigation by the Director of Public Prosecutions. On 11 October 1963 Wicks was elected chairman in his place, and his place as vice chairman was filled by Stillman. Stamp was eventually cleared of any wrongdoing in December 1963.

== See also ==
- List of heads of London government
