= J. Comyns Carr =

British critic

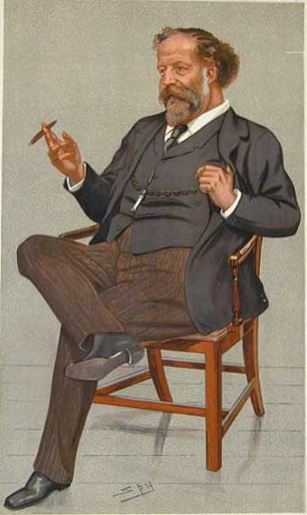
"An Art Critic" February 1893 caricature by Spy (Leslie Ward) in Vanity Fair

Joseph William Comyns Carr (1 March 1849 – 12 December 1916) was an English drama and art critic, gallery director, author, poet, playwright and theatre manager.

Beginning his career as an art critic, Carr was a vigorous advocate for Pre-Raphaelite art and a vocal critic of the "short-sighted" art establishment. In 1877 he became a director of the Grosvenor Gallery and promoting Pre-Raphaelite painters and other important exhibitors, such as James McNeill Whistler, Dante Gabriel Rossetti and Edward Burne-Jones. Ten years later he founded the rival New Gallery.

Carr also wrote essays, books, plays, librettos, English-language adaptations of foreign works and stage adaptations of Dickens novels and classic tales like King Arthur and Faust.

== Early life and family ==
J. Comyns Carr was born in Marylebone, Middlesex, England, the seventh of ten children. His parents were Jonathan Carr, a woollen draper, and his Irish wife, Catherine Grace Comyns. Kate Comyns Carr, his sister, became a portrait artist; his brother Jonathan Carr developed the world's first garden suburb Bedford Park. Comyns Carr was educated at Bruce Castle School, Tottenham, Middlesex, from 1862 to 1865. He studied law at the University of London and graduated in 1869, beginning to practise at the bar at the Inner Temple, London. He soon gave up law for a career in journalism and became drama critic for the Echo.

In 1873 in Dresden, Carr married the author Alice Laura Vansittart née Strettell (1850–1927), a novelist and designer. Alice designed the bold costume that Ellen Terry wore as Lady Macbeth, and in which John Singer Sargent painted her in 1889. Sargent also painted Mrs Comyns Carr in 1889 and several portraits of her sister, Alma, and illustrated Alma's Spanish and Italian Folk-Songs in 1897. Carr and his wife had three children: Philip, Dorothy and Arthur (a barrister and Liberal Member of Parliament). Carr was a member of the Arts Club and the Garrick Club. He published two memoirs: Some Eminent Victorians (1908), and Coasting Bohemia (1914).

== Career ==
=== Art ===
Carr in the 1910s

In 1873, Carr became an art critic for the Pall Mall Gazette. The same year, in The Globe, he wrote a series of widely read articles about contemporary artists. Dante Gabriel Rossetti took notice of these and befriended him. Carr was a strong critic of the art establishment, decrying what he saw as its short-sightedness. In 1875 he was engaged in 1875 by the influential French journal L'Art as its English editor. In 1881–83, he founded and edited Art and Letters. As the first editor from 1883 to 1886 of The English Illustrated Magazine. He also wrote for a number of other journals including the Art Journal, Saturday Review, the Examiner, the World and the Manchester Guardian. Carr wrote books and articles about art championing the Pre-Raphaelite school of art, as well as monographic works on artists such as Edward Burne-Jones, Frederick Walker and Sir Hubert von Herkomer.

Carr and Charles Hallé were appointed co-directors of the Grosvenor Gallery in 1877 by Sir Coutts Lindsay. The gallery promoted Pre-Raphaelite painters and exhibited provocative work. James McNeill Whistler, Rossetti and Burne-Jones exhibited frequently at the Grosvenor Gallery. In 1887, Carr and Hallé resigned from that gallery (which closed in 1890), after a dispute with Lindsay, and quickly founded the rival New Gallery, capturing Burne-Jones and most of the Grosvenor Gallery's other important artists. Carr continued as co-director until 1908. He also wrote the introduction to the British section of the 1911 International Exhibition of Fine Arts at Rome and later was chosen as the English representative to the Art Congress.

=== Theatre ===
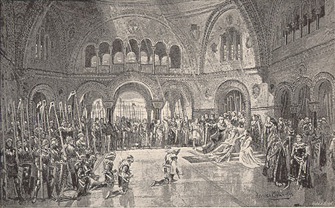
Scene from King Arthur

Carr was also the author of dramatic works, beginning with several light comedies in the early 1880s for the German Reed Entertainments at St George's Hall. He also wrote numerous plays and adapted a number of French plays, such as Frou-Frou, produced at the Princess's Theatre, London (1881); a stage adaptation of Far From the Madding Crowd co-authored with Thomas Hardy (1881); Hugh Conway's Called Back (1884), which was very successful for the actor–manager Herbert Beerbohm Tree; Dark Days; Boys Together; In the Days of the Duke; A Fireside Hamlet; The United Pair; The Naturalist (1887, an operetta with music by Charles King Hall); The Friar; and Forgiveness. At the Haymarket Theatre from 1887 to 1893, Carr acted as Tree's literary adviser and partner.

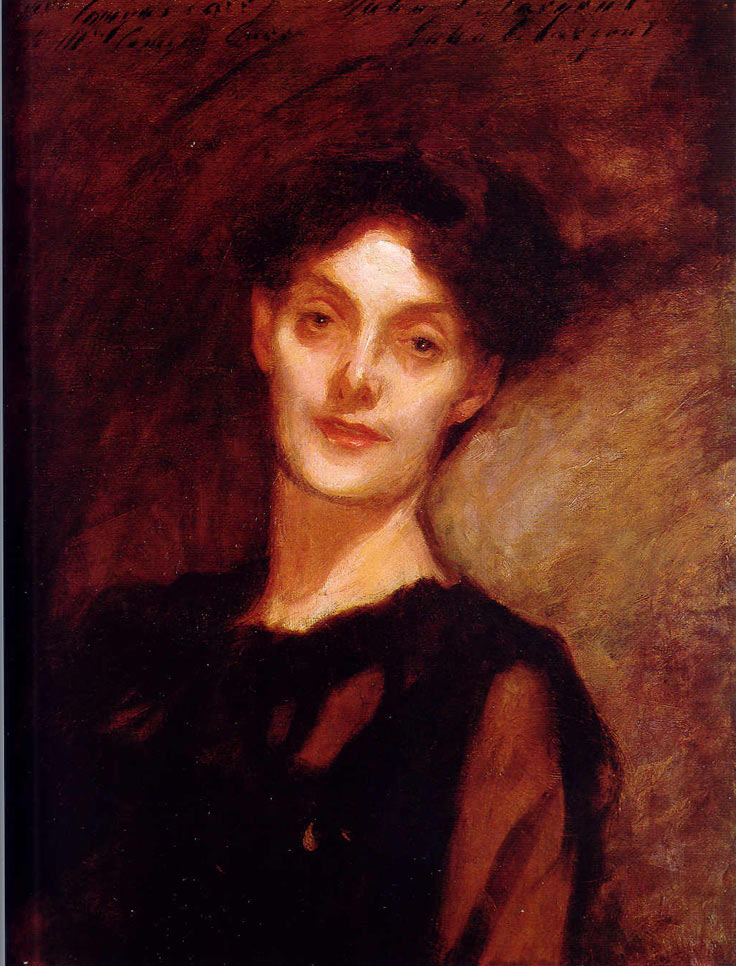
Mrs J. W. Comyns Carr, John Singer Sargent, c. 1889

Carr leased the Comedy Theatre from 1893 to 1896. At the same time, his King Arthur (1895), a blank verse play inspired by the writings of Thomas Malory and Alfred Tennyson, as well as by the visual images of the Pre-Raphaelites, was produced by Henry Irving in the Lyceum Theatre. It starred Irving and Ellen Terry, with incidental music composed by Arthur Sullivan and sets, costumes and artwork designed by Carr's friend Edward Burne-Jones. This spectacular production was a success for Irving and ran for over 100 performances, also touring North America. Another play that year was Delia Harding, an adaptation of a Victorien Sardou play, at the Comedy Theatre. Also for Irving's company, in 1897 he produced an English version of Madame Sans-Gêne by Sardou and Émile Moreau in 1897, which played on both sides of the Atlantic. Carr also dramatised The Strange Case of Dr Jekyll and Mr. Hyde in 1910, starring H. B. Irving at Queen's Theatre.

Carr collaborated with Arthur Wing Pinero and Arthur Sullivan on The Beauty Stone, an opera billed as a "romantic musical drama", at the Savoy Theatre in 1898. The Faustian theme was not what the Savoy audiences were used to, and the piece never found an audience, closing after fifty performances. Carr's adaptation of Oliver Twist was produced by Herbert Beerbohm Tree at His Majesty's Theatre, London (1905). It was also produced on Broadway in 1905 and 1912. From 1899 to 1904, after Irving transferred control of the Lyceum, Carr managed the theatre.

Carr's Tristram and Iseult (1906), a pseudo-medieval drama, was produced at the Adelphi Theatre starring Matheson Lang, Lily Brayton and Oscar Asche. An adaptation of Dickens' The Mystery of Edwin Drood (1907) was produced by Tree in Cardiff. Carr's theory of the play was that Jasper, under the influence of opium, attempted to act upon his murderous impulses, but Drood, overhearing his uncle's ravings, was able to escape. This was followed by an adaptation of Goethe's Faust, for Tree in 1908, in collaboration with Stephen Phillips.

At the Royal Opera House in 1913–14, Carr was artistic adviser. An admirer of Richard Wagner, Carr was responsible for the first English performance of Wagner's Parsifal, in 1914 at Covent Garden.

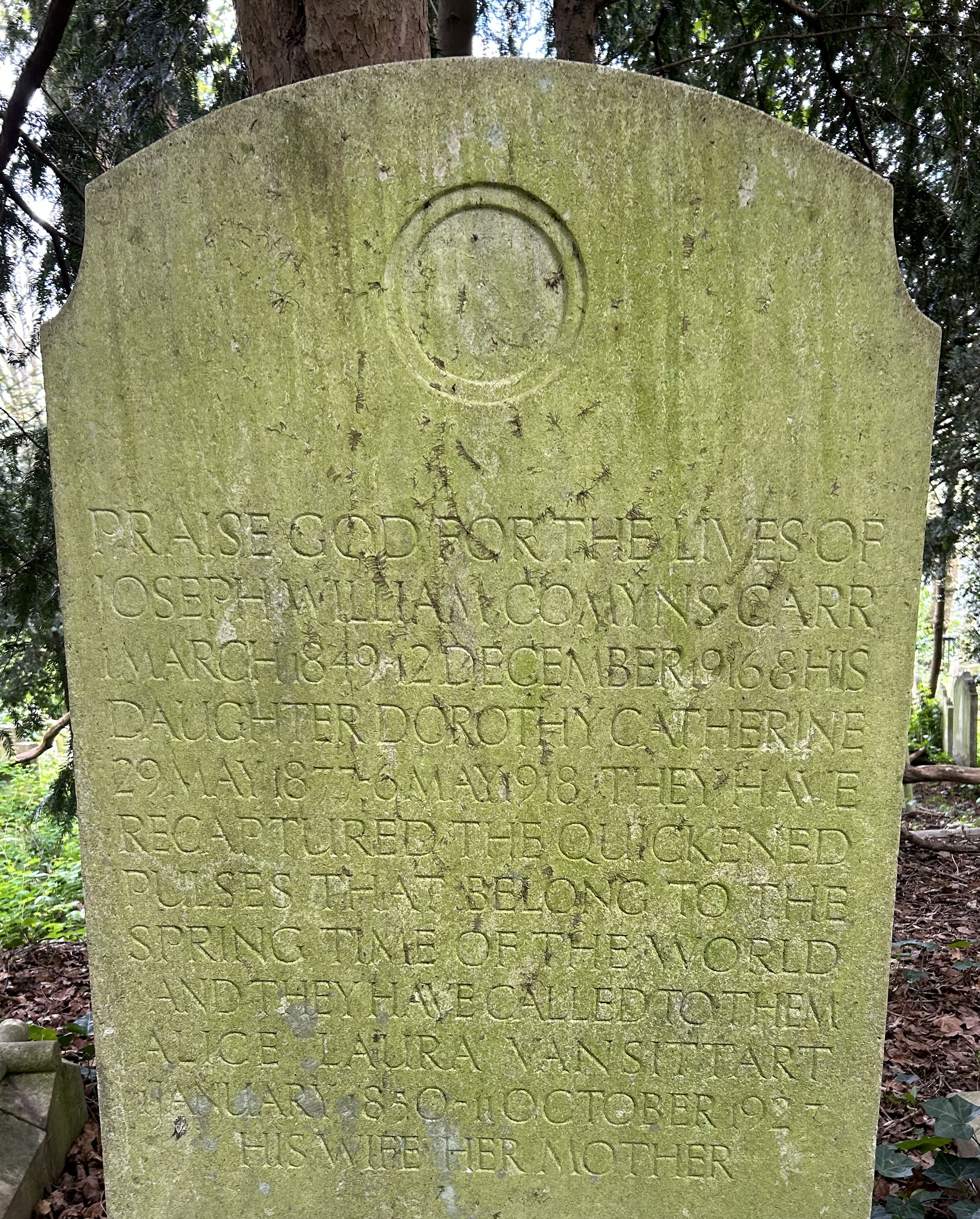
Grave of J. Comyns Carr in Highgate Cemetery

== Death ==
Carr died of cancer at the age of 67 at his home in South Kensington, London. He was buried in Highgate Cemetery.

== Books by Carr ==
- Drawings by the Old Masters, 1877
- The Abbey Church of St Albans, 1877
- Examples of Contemporary Art, 1878
- Essays on Art, 1879
- Hubert Herkomer, 1882
- Art in Provincial France, 1883
- Frederick Walker: An Essay, 1885
- Papers on Art, 1885
- Exhibition of Works of Sir Edward Burne-Jones 1898
- Some Eminent Victorians; Personal Recollections in the World of Art and Letters, 1908
- Coasting Bohemia, 1914
- The Ideals of Painting, 1917 (published posthumously).
