= Vansittart (ship) =

Several ships have been named Vansittart:

- Vansittart (1814 ship) was launched at New York in 1807, under another name. She was captured c.1814 and new owners gave her the name Vansittart. She was initially a West Indiaman. Then between 1817 and 1837 she made seven voyages as a whaler in the British Southern Whale Fisheries. Thereafter she was a merchantman sailing out of Shields. She foundered on 2 February 1855.
- Vansittart (1834 ship) was a schooner of 108 tons burthen launched at Topsham.

== See also ==
- Vansittart (East Indiaman) - one of four vessels
- HMS Vansittart
