= List of shipwrecks in February 1854 =

The list of shipwrecks in February 1854 includes ships sunk, foundered, wrecked, grounded, or otherwise lost during February 1854.

== 1 February ==
List of shipwrecks: 1 February 1854
| Ship | State | Description |
|---|---|---|
| Acorn | United Kingdom | The ship struck the Boulmer Rocks, on the coast of Northumberland and was damaged. She was on a voyage from London to Leith, Lothian. She was refloated and put in to Warkworth, Northumberland in a leaky condition. |
| Aurora | Norway | The ship was driven ashore at Ålesund. She was on a voyage from London, United Kingdom to Fredrikshald. |
| Courier | United Kingdom | The ship was driven ashore in Rhoscolyn Bay. She was on a voyage from Bombay, India to Liverpool, Lancashire. She was refloated with assistance from the steamship Courier (United Kingdom) and taken in to Liverpool. |
| Mary T. Starrett | United States | The ship was abandoned in the Atlantic Ocean. Her crew were rescued by Westmoreland (United Kingdom) and she was scuttled. Mary T. Starrett was on a voyage from New York to Havre de Grâce, Seine-Inféreieure, France. |
| Trader | United Kingdom | The ship was in collision with the schooner Delta (United Kingdom) at Whitby, Yorkshire and was driven ashore. She was on a voyage from Hartlepool, County Durham to Maldon, Essex. She was refloated and taken in to Whitby. |

== 2 February ==
List of shipwrecks: 2 February 1854
| Ship | State | Description |
|---|---|---|
| America | (United Kingdom of Great Britain and Ireland) British North America | The full-rigged Cape Horner struck the Seven Stones reef, off Land's End, Cornwall, England, United Kingdom, and sank within an hour. She was sailing from Callao, Peru, to Queenstown, County Cork, and London with guano. Her crew were picked up by the pilot boat New Prosperous (United Kingdom) and landed near St Ives, Cornwall. |
| Daring | United Kingdom | The brig was damaged by fire at Melbourne, Victoria. |
| Lontra | Portugal | The brigantine ran aground at Youghal, County Cork, United Kingdom. She was on a voyage from Lisbon to Cork. She was refloated on 12 February and towed in to Youghal. |
| Queen of Scotland | United Kingdom | The paddle steamer ran aground in the Humber. She was refloated on 15 February. |

== 3 February ==
List of shipwrecks: 3 February 1854
| Ship | State | Description |
|---|---|---|
| Ann | United Kingdom | The brig was holed by ice at New York, United States. |
| Anne | United Kingdom | The barque ran aground and sank at Sunderland, County Durham. She was refloated the next day and taken in to Sunderland. |
| British Queen | United Kingdom | The steamship ran aground at Smyrna, Ottoman Empire. She was on a voyage from Smyrna to Liverpool, Lancashire. She was refloated on 5 February and resumed her voyage. |
| Eagle | United Kingdom | The sloop struck rocks and sank at Emanuel Head, Lindisfarne, Northumberland. Her crew were rescued. She was on a voyage from Charlestown, Cornwall to Newcastle upon Tyne, Northumberland. |
| Endeavour | United Kingdom | The smack struck the wreck of Secret (United Kingdom) at Appledore, Devon and was damaged. She was consequently beached. She was on a voyage from Appledore to Newport, Monmouthshire. |
| Margaret Skelly | United Kingdom | The full-rigged ship was destroyed by fire at Calcutta, India. |
| Nymph | United Kingdom | The barque ran aground on the Faqueers Reef, off Akyab, Burma. |

== 4 February ==
List of shipwrecks: 4 February 1854
| Ship | State | Description |
|---|---|---|
| Betsey and Isabella | United Kingdom | The ship ran aground on the Saltscar Rocks, Yorkshire. She was on a voyage from Perth to London. She was refloated and taken in to Sunderland, County Durham in a severely leaky condition. |
| Doras | United Kingdom | The sloop ran aground and was damaged on the Carmel Wars Sandbank, in the Irish Sea off the coast of Cumberland. |
| Eliza and Jane | United Kingdom | The ship was driven ashore at Redcar, Yorkshire. She was on a voyage from Exeter, Devon to Middlesbrough, Yorkshire. She was refloated and resumed her voyage. |
| Fairy Queen | United Kingdom | The schooner was driven ashore at Salthouse, Norfolk. She was refloated and resumed her voyage. |
| Harlequin | United Kingdom | The ship ran aground at Teignmouth, Devon. She was on a voyage from Newcastle upon Tyne, Northumberland to Teignmouth. She was refloated and taken in to Teignmouth. |
| Margaret | United Kingdom | The ship ran aground and was wrecked on the Duddon Sands, Lancashire. Her crew were rescued. She was on a voyage from Bangor to Maryport, Cumberland. |
| Marie Juliette | France | The schooner was driven ashore and sank at Urville, Manche. She was on a voyage from Dunkirk, Nord to Bayonne, Basses-Pyrénées. |
| Oberon | Lübeck | The schooner was wrecked on the Oosterbank, in the North Sea off Schouwen, Zeeland, Netherlands. Her crew were rescued. She was on a voyage from Newcastle upon Tyne, Northumberland, United Kingdom to Málaga, Spain. |
| Rob Roy | United Kingdom | The schooner ran aground on Scroby Sands, Norfolk. She was refloated. |
| Sisters | United Kingdom | The full-rigged ship ran aground on the Maplin Sand, in the North Sea off the coast of Essex. She was refloated with the assistance of a Board of Customs cutter and the tender Fly (United Kingdom). |
| Soho | United Kingdom | The schooner was driven ashore west of Portgordon, Moray. She was on a voyage from Portsoy, Aberdeenshire to London. She was refloated the next day and resumed her voyage. |
| Valleyfield | United Kingdom | The ship was abandoned in the Atlantic Ocean. Her crew were rescued by John Sheppard (United Kingdom). Valleyfield was on a voyage from Sierra Leone to London. |

== 5 February ==
List of shipwrecks: 5 February 1854
| Ship | State | Description |
|---|---|---|
| Dolphin | United Kingdom | The schooner was abandoned in the North Sea (58°10′N 2°00′E) by all but her captain. Her crew were rescued by the schooner Kossuth (United Kingdom). Dolphin was on a voyage from Aberdeen to Stromness, Orkney Islands. She sank with the presumed loss of her captain. |
| Hannibal | United Kingdom | The full-rigged ship was driven ashore at Folkestone, Kent. She was on a voyage from London to Sydney, New South Wales. She was refloated the next day with the assistance of three tugs and towed in to London for repairs. |
| Lady Mary | United Kingdom | The barque ran aground on the Newcombe Sand, in the North Sea off the coast of Suffolk. She was on a voyage from London to Seaham, County Durham. She was refloated and taken in to Lowestoft, Suffolk. |
| Recontre | France | The derelict schooner was taken in to Aldeburgh, Suffolk, United Kingdom. |
| Robusta | France | The ship was wrecked at the mouth of the Gironde with the loss of all hands. She was on a voyage from "Aig-sur-Mer" to Bordeaux, Gironde. |

== 6 February ==
List of shipwrecks: 6 February 1854
| Ship | State | Description |
|---|---|---|
| Amanda | United States | The ship was driven ashore and wrecked at Marshfield, Massachusetts. She was on a voyage from Smyrna, Ottoman Empire to Boston, Massachusetts. |
| Good Intent | United Kingdom | The ship was driven ashore at St. Margaret's Hope, Orkney Islands. Her crew were rescued. She was on a voyage from Leith, Lothian to Liverpool, Lancashire. |
| Irene | Prussia | The ship ran aground on Scroby Sands, Norfolk, United Kingdom. She was on a voyage from Newcastle upon Tyne, Northumberland, United Kingdom to Barcelona, Spain. She was refloated the next day and taken in to Great Yarmouth, Norfolk. |
| Jernbarden | Norway | The ship was wrecked off Molde. Her crew were rescued. She was on a voyage from Newcastle upon Tyne to Moss. |
| Premium | United Kingdom | The brig was driven ashore 3 nautical miles (5.6 km) west of Dover, Kent. She was on a voyage from South Shields, County Durham to Southampton, Hampshire. She was refloated and put in to Dover in a leaky condition. |
| Reform | United Kingdom | The ship was driven ashore and wrecked at Lerwick, Shetland Islands. She was on a voyage from South Shields to Dublin. She was refloated on 10 May and taken in to Lerwick. |
| Three Kenner | Norway | The ship was driven ashore in the Bommelfjord. She was on a voyage from Montrose, Forfarshire, United Kingdom to Drammen. |
| William | United Kingdom | The ship was driven ashore at Zoutkamp, Groningen, Netherlands. She was on a voyage from Newcastle upon Tyne to Málaga, Spain. |
| William | United Kingdom | The ship was driven ashore near Dunbar, Lothian. She was on a voyage from Clackmannan to London. She was refloated on 24 February and taken in to Hartlepool, County Durham for repairs. |

== 7 February ==
List of shipwrecks: 7 February 1854
| Ship | State | Description |
|---|---|---|
| Bonadventure | United Kingdom | The ship was driven ashore at Rhosneigr, Anglesey. Her crew were rescued. She was on a voyage from Savannah, Georgia, United States to Liverpool, Lancashire. She was refloated on 13 February. |
| Caroline | United Kingdom | The ship was driven ashore at Liverpool, Lancashire. She was on a voyage from Charleston, South Carolina, United States to Liverpool. She was refloated. |
| Cherie | United Kingdom | The sloop ran aground and was severely damaged at Dunkirk, Nord. She was on a voyage from Pontrieux, Côtes-du-Nord to Dunkirk. She was refloated and taken in to Dunkirk in a sinking condition. |
| Clydesdale | United Kingdom | The ship was wrecked on a reef off Cape Breton, on the south coast of Cuba. Her crew were rescued by a Spanish ship. She was on a voyage from Saint Croix to Cienfuegos, Cuba. |
| Hylton | United Kingdom | The schooner was abandoned in the Irish Sea 10 nautical miles (19 km) south west by south of Holyhead, Anglesey. |
| Vivid | United Kingdom | The ship was wrecked on the Zeehanden Platt, in the North Sea off the coast of the Netherlands. She was on a voyage from Goole, Yorkshire to Rotterdam, South Holland, Netherlands. |

== 8 February ==
List of shipwrecks: 8 February 1854
| Ship | State | Description |
|---|---|---|
| Catherine | United Kingdom | The schooner foundered 10 nautical miles (19 km) south of the Isles of Scilly. Her crew survived. She was on a voyage from Kinsale, County Cork to Cork and London. |
| Gazelle | United Kingdom | The ship ran aground on the Scroby Sands, Norfolk. She was refloated and taken in to Lowestoft, Suffolk in a leaky condition. |
| Heather | United Kingdom | The ship ran aground on the Haisborough Sands, in the North Sea off the coast of Norfolk. She was refloated and taken in to Great Yarmouth, Norfolk in a leaky condition. |
| Manhattan | United States | The ship was driven ashore in the River Mersey. She was on a voyage from New York to Liverpool, Lancashire, United Kingdom. She was refloated the next day. |
| Queen of the Seas | United Kingdom | The ship was driven ashore in Bootle Bay. She was on a voyage from Saint John's, Newfoundland, British North America to Liverpool. She was refloated and taken in to Liverpool. |
| San Francisco | United States | The clipper was wrecked at San Francisco, California. She was on a voyage from New York to San Francisco. |
| Secret | United Kingdom | The steamship was driven ashore at Limerick. She was on a voyage from Limerick to Liverpool. She was refloated. |

== 9 February ==
List of shipwrecks: 9 February 1854
| Ship | State | Description |
|---|---|---|
| Eliza | United Kingdom | The schooner ran aground on the Foulney Bed, in the Irish Sea and was damaged. She was on a voyage from Peel, Isle of Man to Barrow-in-Furness, Lancashire. She was refloated and towed in to Barrow-in-Furness. |
| Eliza | United Kingdom | The ship sank at Aberffraw, Anglesey. She was on a voyage from Cardiff, Glamorgan to Liverpool, Lancashire. |
| Jack Tar | United Kingdom | The schooner ran aground and sank in the Farne Islands, Northumberland. She was on a voyage from Aberdeen to Sunderland, County Durham. |
| Jeune Rose | France | The fishing boat was in collision with Favourite de St. Vaast (France) and sank in the English Channel. Her crew were rescued. |
| Manhattan | United States | The ship was again driven ashore in the River Mersey. She was refloated with the assistance of three tugs. |

== 10 February ==
List of shipwrecks: 10 February 1854
| Ship | State | Description |
|---|---|---|
| Aimable Thérése | France | The ship ran aground and was wrecked. She was on a voyage from Marseille, Bouches-du-Rhône to Cannes, Alpes-Maritimes. |
| Columbus | Kingdom of Hanover | The ship was wrecked on Borkum. Three crew were rescued. She was on a voyage from Cardiff, Glamorgan, United Kingdom to Papenburg. |
| Constellation | United Kingdom | The ship ran aground at Matanzas, Cuba. She was on a voyage from Havana, Cuba to the Clyde. She was refloated and rescued her voyage. |
| Emilie | United Kingdom | The ship was driven ashore at Birkenhead, Cheshire. She was on a voyage from Liverpool, Lancashire to Africa. She was refloated the next day. |
| James Niles | United States | The steamboat sank in the Ohio River at Louisville, Kentucky with much loss of life. |
| Medora | United Kingdom | The barque ran aground at Porto Plata, Dominican Republic. She was on a voyage from Porto Plata to the Clyde. She was refloated on 12 February and taken in to Porto Plata in a waterlogged condition. |
| Menai | United Kingdom | The ship was driven ashore at Calais, France. She was on a voyage from London to Calais. |

== 11 February ==
List of shipwrecks: 11 February 1854
| Ship | State | Description |
|---|---|---|
| Leon | Belgium | The brig was driven ashore and severely damaged at Ostend, West Flanders. She was on a voyage from Lisbon, Portugal to Ostend. She was refloated on 13 February, but was consequently condemned. |
| Lusitania | United Kingdom | The steamship was driven ashore at Birkenhead, Cheshire. She was on a voyage from Brazil to Birkenhead. She was refloated the next day and taken in to Birkenhead. |

== 12 February ==
List of shipwrecks: 12 February 1854
| Ship | State | Description |
|---|---|---|
| Emma | United Kingdom | The ship ran aground on the Sandwich Flats. She was on a voyage from Warkworth, Northumberland to Havre de Grâce, Seine-Inférieure, France. She was refloated and taken in to Ramsgate, Kent in a leaky condition. |

== 13 February ==
List of shipwrecks: 13 February 1854
| Ship | State | Description |
|---|---|---|
| RMS Africa | United Kingdom | The steamship was driven ashore on the Jersey Flats. She was on a voyage from Liverpool, Lancashire to New York, United States. She was refloated on 21 February. |

== 14 February ==
List of shipwrecks: 14 February 1854
| Ship | State | Description |
|---|---|---|
| Amsterdam | Netherlands | The koff was discovered abandoned in the North Sea. She was on a voyage from Bordeaux, Gironde, France to Great Yarmouth, Norfolk, United Kingdom and Amsterdam, North Holland. She was towed in to Texel, North Holland. |
| Glenburn | United Kingdom | The barque was run into by the tug Hope (United Kingdom) and was consequently beached in the River Thames. She was on a voyage from London to Newport, Monmouthshire. |
| Nora | Norway | The ship was driven ashore north of Trondheim. She was on a voyage from London to Christiania. |
| Sofia | (Russian Empire) Grand Duchy of Finland | The schooner was driven ashore on Læsø, Denmark. Her crew survived. She was on a voyage from Newcastle upon Tyne, Northumberland, United Kingdom to Lübeck. |
| Washington | (Russian Empire) Grand Duchy of Finland | The ship was wrecked on Thornby Island, off Hirtshals, Denmark. Her crew were rescued. She was on a voyage from Newcastle upon Tyne, Northumberland, United Kingdom to Copenhagen, Denmark. |

== 15 February ==
List of shipwrecks: 15 February 1854
| Ship | State | Description |
|---|---|---|
| Les Deux Frères, and Volunta | France; United Kingdom | The West Dock at Hartlepool, County Durham was drained to a depth of 11 feet (3.4 m) to enable some masonry repairs to be done, This caused the brig Volunta to heel over and sink the lugger Les Deux Frères. Her crew escaped before she sank. |
| Maren Christine | Duchy of Holstein | The ship ran aground on the Bjornegrund and was damaged. She was refloated and consequently beached at "Albue", Denmark. She was on a voyage from Flensburg to Perth, United Kingdom. She was refloated and taken in to Nakskov for repairs. |
| Mary | (United Kingdom of Great Britain and Ireland) British North America | The ship was sunk by ice in the Atlantic Ocean with the loss of a crew member. Survivors took to the longboat; they were rescued five days later. She was on a voyage from Liverpool, Lancashire to Boston, Massachusetts, United States. |
| Susan | United Kingdom | The ship was driven onto the breakwater and severely damaged at Porthcawl, Glamorgan. |
| Traveller | United Kingdom | The ship sank near Sunderland, County Durham with the loss of three of her crew. |

== 16 February ==
List of shipwrecks: 16 February 1854
| Ship | State | Description |
|---|---|---|
| Bisaieul | France | The chasse-marée was driven ashore and wrecked at Brancaster, Norfolk, United Kingdom. Her crew were rescued. She was on a voyage from Middlesbrough, Yorkshire to Brest, Finistère. |
| Columbus | United Kingdom | The ship was wrecked at Norden, Kingdom of Hanover. |
| Jacob Bell | United States | The pilot boat went ashore in a gale at the Sandy Hook beach with a loss of all the crew. |
| Lucifer | Russia | The barque was driven ashore and wrecked at the Belém Tower, Lisbon, Portugal. |
| Naiad | United Kingdom | The ship ran aground on the Blacktail Spit, in the North Sea off the coast of Essex. She was refloated the next day. |
| Resolution | (United Kingdom of Great Britain and Ireland) British North America | The brigantine was wrecked on the Black Ledge, off Whitehead, Nova Scotia. Her crew were rescued. She was on a voyage from New York, United States to Saint John, New Brunswick. |
| Virginie Augustine | France | The schooner was driven ashore and wrecked at Blakeney, Norfolk. Her crew were rescued. She was on a voyage from Warkworth, Northumberland, United Kingdom to Dieppe, Seine-Inférieure. |

== 17 February ==
List of shipwrecks: 17 February 1854
| Ship | State | Description |
|---|---|---|
| Australia | United States | The ship ran aground on Taylor's Bank, in Liverpool Bay. She was on a voyage from Liverpool, Lancashire, United Kingdom to New York. She was refloated but was run ashore in the River Mersey. She was refloated on 20 February and towed in to Liverpool. |
| Belle | United Kingdom | The full-rigged ship was driven ashore at the Dingle. She was on a voyage from Sydney, Nova Scotia, British North America to Liverpool, Lancashire. She was refloated and taken in to Birkenhead, Cheshire. |
| Brilliant | United Kingdom | The ship foundered off Cape St. Vincent, Portugal. Her crew were rescued by Baltrana (Bremen). Brilliant was on a voyage from Alicante, Spain to London. |
| Cherokee | United Kingdom | The barque ran aground on the East Hoyle Bank, in Liverpool Bay. Some of her crew were taken off by the Liverpool Lifeboat. She then floated off and came ashore at Mockbeggar, Cheshire, where she was wrecked. The remainder of her crew were rescued. She was on a voyage from Liverpool to Africa. Cherokee was refloated on 25 February and towed into the River Mersey. |
| Commodore | United Kingdom | The steamship was driven ashore at Egremont, Lancashire. She was on a voyage from Havre de Grâce, Seine-Inférieure to Liverpool. She was refloated and taken in to Liverpool. |
| Coromandel | United Kingdom | The schooner was in collision with another vessel in the River Mersey and was severely damaged. Two of her three crew got aboard the other vessel. Coromandel then collided with another vessel off New Brighton, Cheshire and capsized. The remaining crew member was then rescued and the vessel came ashore at New Brighton, where she was plundered by the local inhabitants. She was on a voyage from Liverpool to Ulverston, Lancashire. Coromandel was righted the next day. |
| Eleanor | United Kingdom | The ship was driven ashore and wrecked at Combe Martin, Devon. |
| Essex | United Kingdom | The barque was wrecked on the Scroby Sands, Norfolk with the loss of all fourteen crew. |
| Evelyne | United Kingdom | The full-rigged ship was driven ashore in Bootle Bay. She was on a voyage from Liverpool to London. She was refloated with the aid of three tugs. |
| Familiens Haab | Norway | The sloop was driven ashore and wrecked at Bergen. |
| Frederick | Stralsund | The ship was driven ashore and wrecked at Höganäs, Sweden. She was on a voyage from Grangemouth, Stirlingshire, United Kingdom to Stettin |
| Harriet | United Kingdom | The ship was driven ashore and sank at Runcorn, Cheshire. Her crew were rescued by a pilot boat. |
| Katherine Grolladys | United Kingdom | The ship was wrecked on the Roman Rock, off Bird Island, Cape Colony. She was on a voyage from Port Elizabeth, Cape Colony to Liverpool. |
| Laura | United Kingdom | The brig ran aground on the Bree Bank, in the North Sea off the coast of Nord, France with the loss of all hands. |
| Mail | United Kingdom | The steamship collided with a brig or schooner off Seacombe, Cheshire. She was taken in to Liverpool, where she sank. |
| Margaret | United Kingdom | The flat was wrecked on the West Hoyle Sandbank, in Liverpool Bay. Her crew survived. She subsequently floated off and came ashore at Hoylake, Cheshire. |
| Maria Whitfield | United Kingdom | The brig ran aground on the Goodwin Sands, Kent. She was on a voyage from South Shields, County Durham to Portsmouth, Hampshire. She was refloated and taken in to Dover, Kent. |
| Two Friends | United Kingdom | The brig was wrecked on the Royn Sands, in the North Sea. Her crew survived. |
| Unnamed lifeboat | United Kingdom | The lifeboat capsized in Liverpool Bay with the loss of ten of her eleven crew. She was going to the aid of Cherokee (United Kingdom). |

== 18 February ==
List of shipwrecks: 18 February 1854
| Ship | State | Description |
|---|---|---|
| Brevet, and Windsor | United Kingdom | The brig Windsor was driven into the full-rigged ship Brevet at Liverpool, Lancashire. Both vessels were severely damaged. Brevet was on a voyage from Liverpool to Melbourne, Victoria. Windsor was on a voyage from Liverpool to Barra, Outer Hebrides. |
| Clara Josephine | France | The ship was driven ashore at Vauville, Manche. She was on a voyage from Nantes, Loire-Inférieure to Cardiff, Glamorgan, United Kingdom. She had been refloated by 6 March and towed in to Cherbourg, Manche. |
| Eagle | United Kingdom | The schooner foundered off Cromer, Norfolk. |
| Magnet | United Kingdom | The ship was run ashore at Wisbech, Cambridgeshire. She was on a voyage from Wisbech to Seaham, County Durham. She was refloated the next day. |
| Mary | United Kingdom | The flat sank at Liverpool. Her crew were rescued. |
| Penninghame | United Kingdom | The barque was driven ashore and wrecked on Salt Island, Anglesey. She was on a voyage from Liverpool to Rio de Janeiro, Brazil. |
| Rangoon | United Kingdom | The ship struck the Pan Sand, floated off and was driven ashore at Herne Bay, Kent. She was on a voyage from Ceylon to London. Rangoon was refloated on 23 February. |
| True Friends | United Kingdom | The ship was wrecked on the Royn Sand, in the Lynn Deeps. Her crew took to a boat; they were rescued by Eagle (United Kingdom). True Friends was on a voyage from Newcastle upon Tyne, Northumberland to King's Lynn, Norfolk. |
| Wasp | United Kingdom | The brig was wrecked on the Burbo Bank, in Liverpool Bay with the loss of all hands. She was on a voyage from Liverpool to Africa. |
| W. V. Kent | United States | The ship ran aground in the Victoria Channel. She was on a voyage from Liverpool to Philadelphia, Pennsylvania. She was refloated and put back to Liverpool. |

== 19 February ==
List of shipwrecks: 19 February 1854
| Ship | State | Description |
|---|---|---|
| Dolphin | United Kingdom | The ship was driven ashore at Wells-next-the-Sea, Norfolk. |
| Henry and Mary | United Kingdom | The ship was driven ashore at St. Margaret's Hope, Orkney Islands. |
| Hope | United Kingdom | The ship ran aground on Scroby Sands, Norfolk. She was on a voyage from London to South Shields, County Durham. |
| Lark | United Kingdom | The schooner was wrecked on the Burrows Sand, in the North Sea off the coast of Essex. Her crew were rescued. She was on a voyage from London to Mistley, Essex. |
| Mary | United Kingdom | The brig was wrecked on the Sunk Sand, off the north Kent coast. Her crew took to the longboat; they were rescued by the fishing smack Victory (United Kingdom). |
| Minerva | United Kingdom | The ship was driven ashore at Holtenau, Prussia. She was on a voyage from Flensburg, Duchy of Holstein to London. |
| Montezuma | United Kingdom | The ship ran aground on the Great Burbo Bank, in Liverpool Bay. She was on a voyage from Liverpool, Lancashire to Boston, Massachusetts, United States. She subsequently floated off and was towed in to Liverpool. |
| Rose | United Kingdom | The ship was driven ashore and wrecked at Hunstanton, Norfolk. Her crew were rescued. She was on a voyage from Hull, Yorkshire to Berwick upon Tweed, Northumberland. |
| Vansittart | United Kingdom | The ship ran aground on the Sunk Sand. She was on a voyage from South Shields, County Durham to London. She was refloated and put in to Ramsgate, Kent. |
| William and Sally | United Kingdom | The schooner ran aground on the Barber Sand, in the North Sea off the coast of Norfolk and was abandoned by her crew. She was refloated ashore and beached at Caister-on-Sea where she was wrecked. |

== 20 February ==
List of shipwrecks: 20 February 1854
| Ship | State | Description |
|---|---|---|
| Angelina | France | The ship ran aground off Granville, Manche. Her crew were rescued. She was on a voyage from Newcastle upon Tyne, Northumberland to Nantes, Loire-Inférieure. |
| Brontes | United States | The ship was driven ashore at Philadelphia, Pennsylvania. |
| Moss | Norway | The ship was driven ashore at "Slette", Denmark. |
| Ricardi | Norway | The ship was driven ashore and wrecked at the entrance to the Agger Canal, Denmark. Her crew were rescued. She was on a voyage from Hartlepool, County Durham, United Kingdom to Larvik. |
| S. J. Roberts | United Kingdom | The ship was driven ashore at "Aaricom". She was on a voyage from Marseille, Bouches-du-Rhône, France to New York. She became a wreck on 27 February. |

== 21 February ==
List of shipwrecks: 21 February 1854
| Ship | State | Description |
|---|---|---|
| Cicero | United Kingdom | The ship struck a sunken wreck and lost her steering. She was then wrecked on the Newcombe Sand, in the North Sea off the coast of Suffolk. Her crew were rescued. She was on a voyage from Sunderland, County Durham to Southampton, Hampshire. |
| Jenny | United Kingdom | The ship was wrecked at Cape Otway, Victoria. All on board survived. |
| Providence | United Kingdom | The ship foundered in the North Sea 30 nautical miles (56 km) off Tynemouth, Northumberland. Her crew were rescued by Ythan (United Kingdom). |
| Recovery | United Kingdom | The ship was driven ashore at Rutland, County Donegal. She had become a wreck by 26 February. |
| West Wind | United Kingdom | The ship was damaged by fire at Melbourne, Victoria. |

== 22 February ==
List of shipwrecks: 22 February 1854
| Ship | State | Description |
|---|---|---|
| Earl of Dalhousie | United Kingdom | The ship struck the Whirlpool Rock and sank. She was on a voyage from Melbourne, Victoria to Launceston, Van Diemen's Land. |
| Jupiter | United Kingdom | The steamship was driven ashore at Clee Ness, Lincolnshire. She was refloated the next day. |
| Oliver Cromwell | United Kingdom | The ship ran aground on the Liffey Sands, off Rangoon, Burma. She was on a voyage from Madras, India to Rangoon. She was refloated on 27 February and taken in to Rangoon for repairs. |
| Soobrow | India | The ship ran aground on the Liffey Sands. She was on a voyage from Rangoon to Calcutta. She was refloated and resumed her voyage. |

== 23 February ==
List of shipwrecks: 23 February 1854
| Ship | State | Description |
|---|---|---|
| Defiance | United Kingdom | The schooner was in collision with the brig Livingston (United Kingdom) and sank in the North Sea 8 nautical miles (15 km) north north east of Flamborough Head, Yorkshire. Her crew were rescued by Livingston. Defiance was on a voyage from Folkestone, Kent to Seaham, County Durham. |
| Jemima | United Kingdom | The schooner was wrecked east of Arbroath, Forfarshire. She was on a voyage from Hartlepool, County Durham to aberdeen. |
| Lionel | United Kingdom | The schooner was abandoned in the North Sea. Her crew were rescued by Neptunus (Norway). Lionel was on a voyage from South Shields, County Durham to Namsos, Norway. |
| O'Halloran | United Kingdom | The brig foundered in the Atlantic Ocean off the Abrolhos Archipelago, Brazil. |
| Orline St. John | United States | The barque was abandoned in the Atlantic Ocean with the loss of four of the nine people on board. Survivors were rescued by the barque Saxonville (United Kingdom). Orline St. John was on a voyage from Norfolk, Virginia to Barbados. |
| Trotter | United Kingdom | The ship was driven ashore and sank at the mouth of the River Parrett. |
| Vivid | (United Kingdom of Great Britain and Ireland) Victoria | The schooner departed from Melbourne for Circular Head, Van Diemen's Land. No further trace, presumed foundered with the loss of all hands. |

== 24 February ==
List of shipwrecks: 24 February 1854
| Ship | State | Description |
|---|---|---|
| Albert | France | The ship ran aground on the Goodwin Sands, Kent, United Kingdom and was abandoned by her crew. She was on a voyage from Newcastle upon Tyne, Northumberland, United Kingdom to Nantes, Loire-Inférieure. She was refloated by the lugger Buffalo Gal and taken in to Ramsgate, Kent. |
| Ramon | Hamburg | The ship was driven ashore on Langeoog, Kingdom of Hanover. She was on a voyage from Havana, Cuba to Hamburg. |
| True Briton | United Kingdom | The ship ran aground on the Newcombe Sand, in the North Sea off the coast of Suffolk. She was refloated and taken in to Lowestoft, Suffolk. |

== 25 February ==
List of shipwrecks: 25 February 1854
| Ship | State | Description |
|---|---|---|
| Azorean, Caledonian, Jane, and Isabella | United Kingdom | The steamship Caledonian was driven into the schooners Azorean and Jane at Cuxhaven. All three vessels were severely damaged' Caledonian subsequently drove into the brig Isabella, which was also damaged. |
| Jane | United Kingdom | The schooner was driven ashore in Deer Sound. She was on a voyage from Sunderland, County Durham to Kirkwall, Orkney Islands. |
| Oriental | United States | The clipper ran aground and was wrecked at the mouth of the Min. All on board were rescued. |
| Simlax | United Kingdom | The ship was wrecked in the Farne Islands, Northumberland. She was on a voyage from Grangemouth, Stirlingshire to Havre de Grâce, Seine-Inférieure, France. |

== 26 February ==
List of shipwrecks: 26 February 1854
| Ship | State | Description |
|---|---|---|
| Catherina | Duchy of Holstein | The ship ran aground and sank on the Hetterven. Her crew were rescued. |
| Gleaner | United Kingdom | The ship ran aground on the Colt Rock, off Berehaven, County Cork. |
| Harbinger | United Kingdom | The ship was driven ashore. She was on a voyage from Montrose, Forfarshire to Barcelona, Spain. She was refloated and taken in to Dover, Kent in a leaky condition. |
| Orleans | United States | The ship struck the Calf of Man, Isle of Man and capsized. Her crew were rescued. She was on a voyage from Liverpool, Lancashire, United Kingdom. She was subsequently towed in to Douglas, Isle of Man in a capsized condition by Mona's Queen ( (United Kingdom of Great Britain and Ireland) Isle of Man). |
| Superior | Sweden | The ship was driven ashore at Copenhagen, Denmark. She was on a voyage from Lisbon, Portugal to a Baltic port. |
| Sylphiden | Denmark | The ship was driven ashore at "Steenberg". She was on a voyage from Hull, Yorkshire to Copenhagen. |
| Thistle | (United Kingdom of Great Britain and Ireland) South Australia | The schooner capsized in a squall at Adelaide. All on board were rescued. |
| William and Eliza | United Kingdom | The full-rigged ship was abandoned in the North Sea. Her crew were rescued by the koff Vaarwel (Netherlands). |

== 27 February ==
List of shipwrecks: 26 February 1854
| Ship | State | Description |
|---|---|---|
| Benjamin Elkin | United Kingdom | The barque was wrecked at Port Fairy, Victoria. She was on a voyage from Port Fairy to London. |
| Catherina | Norway | The ship was driven ashore and sank at "Hetteoren". Her crew were rescued. |
| Dundee | United Kingdom | The barque was wrecked at Port Fairy. |
| Edinburgh | United Kingdom | The steamship ran aground on a reef off Borkum, Kingdom of Hanover and was partly abandoned. Twelve people took to a boat and were presumed to have subsequently been drowned. She was on a voyage from London to Hamburg. |
| George and Eliza | United Kingdom | The ship was in collision with Courser and sank off Grimsby, Lincolnshire. Her crew were rescued. She was on a voyage from Newcastle upon Tyne, Northumberland to London. |
| Innellan | United Kingdom | The barque was reported to have been wrecked at Port Fairy. She was on a voyage from London to Portland, Maine, United States and Melbourne, Victoria. |
| Iris | (United Kingdom of Great Britain and Ireland) British North America | The ship was abandoned in the Atlantic Ocean. Her crew were rescued by Boreas (United Kingdom). Iris was on a voyage from Saint John, New Brunswick to Puerto Rico. |
| J. J. Hathorn | United States | The ship ran aground in the Delaware River. She was on a voyage from Liverpool, Lancashire, United Kingdom to Philadelphia, Pennsylvania. |
| Katherine Gwlladys | United Kingdom | The ship was wrecked at the mouth of the Roman River, Cape Colony. She was on a voyage from Port Elizabeth, Cape Colony to Liverpool, Lancashire. |
| Ocean Queen | United Kingdom | The ship was run down and sunk in the North Sea 3 nautical miles (5.6 km) east by south of Whitby, Yorkshire by Policy (United Kingdom). Her crew were rescued by Policy. Ocean Queen was on a voyage from Hartlepool, County Durham to London. |
| Orlando | United States | The ship ran aground on the Memory Rock, Bahamas. She was on a voyage from Matanzas, Cuba to Cowes, Isle of Wight, United Kingdom. She was refloated and taken in to Nassau, Bahamas. |
| Pursuit | United Kingdom | The ship was abandoned on the Smithwick Sand, in the North Sea off the coast of Yorkshire. She was later refloated and taken in to Bridlington. |
| Sincerity | United Kingdom | The schooner ran aground on the Herd Sand, in the North Sea off the coast of County Durham. She broke up the next day. |
| Union | Kingdom of Hanover | The galiot sprang a leak and was beached on Ameland, Friesland, Netherlands. Her crew survived. She was on a voyage from Newcastle upon Tyne to Altona. |

== 28 February ==
List of shipwrecks: 28 February 1854
| Ship | State | Description |
|---|---|---|
| Alma | United Kingdom | The ship was wrecked near Strömstad, Sweden. All on board were rescued. She was on a voyage from London to Copenhagen, Denmark. |
| Gem | United Kingdom | The Yorkshire Billyboy was run down and sunk by the schooner Sheraton (United Kingdom) off the Heugh Lighthouse, County Durham. Her crew were rescued by Sheraton (United Kingdom). Gem was on a voyage from South Shields, County Durham to London. |
| Hermes | United Kingdom | The ship was wrecked on the English Bank, in the River Plate. She was on a voyage from the Cape Verde Islands to Buenos Aires, Argentina. |
| HMS Princess Royal | Royal Navy | The Albion-class ship of the line ran aground at Gosport, Hampshire. She was refloated with the aid of the tug Pygmy (United Kingdom). |
| Richard Wright | United Kingdom | The ship was in collision with Violante and was abandoned in the Irish Sea. Her crew were rescued by Violante. Richard Wright was on a voyage from Liverpool, Lancashire to Boston, Massachusetts, United States. She was taken in to Whitehaven, Cumberland in a derelict condition. |
| San Joseph | United States | The schooner foundered off Cape Horn, Chile. Her crew were rescued by Boa Fortuna (Portugal). San Joseph was on a voyage from Queenstown, County Cork to Plymouth, United States. |
| Smilax | United Kingdom | The ship was driven ashore in the Farne Islands, Northumberland. She was on a voyage from Grangemouth, Stirlingshire to Havre de Grâce, Seine-Inférieure, France. She had broken up by 7 March. |

== Unknown date ==
List of shipwrecks: Unknown date in February 1854
| Ship | State | Description |
|---|---|---|
| Ann | United Kingdom | The ship was driven ashore and wrecked at Tétouan, Morocco. She was on a voyage from Gibraltar to Bordeaux, Gironde, France. |
| Berwick Castle | United Kingdom | The barque was wrecked on Moriarty's Bank before 28 February. Her crew were rescued by Red Rover (United Kingdom). Berwick Castle was on a voyage from Hobart, Van Diemen's Land to Melbourne, Victoria. |
| Clemence | France | The schooner was abandoned in the Atlantic Ocean before 9 February. |
| Columbian | United Kingdom | The ship was abandoned in the Atlantic Ocean. Her crew were rescued by Cornelius Grinell (United States). Columbian was on a voyage from New Orleans, Louisiana, United States to Liverpool. |
| Emilie | Norway | The schooner was abandoned in the North Sea before 21 February. Her crew were rescued by Clio (Hamburg). Emilie was on a voyage from Grangemouth, Stirlingshire, United Kingdom to Antwerp, Belgium. |
| Flight | United States | The fishing schooner was lost on the Georges Bank. lost with all 12 hands. |
| Frederick | United Kingdom | The ship was abandoned in the Atlantic Ocean. Her crew were rescued by Cornelius Grinell (United States). Frederick was on a voyage from Halifax, Nova Scotia, British North America to Liverpool. |
| Friendship | United Kingdom | The brig was driven ashore at Great Yarmouth, Norfolk. She had become a wreck by 19 February. |
| Golden | United Kingdom | The steamship ran aground at San Diego, California and was severely damaged. She was later refloated and taken in to San Francisco, California for repairs. |
| Gold Hunter | United States | The trading schooner sailed from Gloucester, Massachusetts for Virginia on the night of 17 February and vanished. Lost with all 5 hands. |
| Gothen | Sweden | The brig was driven ashore at Odesa. She had been refloated by 27 February and taken in to Odesa in a severely leaky condition. |
| Hardiesse | Norway | The ship was abandoned in the North Sea. Her three crew were rescued. |
| Hendrika Jantina | Netherlands | The ship was abandoned in the North Sea before 23 February. She was on a voyage from London, United Kingdom to Amsterdam, North Holland. She was towed in to Sheerness, Kent, United Kingdom in a waterlogged condition. |
| Henriette | Netherlands | The ship wrecked on the Tornano Bank, in the Sea of Azov before 27 February. She was on a voyage from Kertch, Russia to Hull, Yorkshire. |
| H. M. Johnson | United States | The schooner was abandoned in the Atlantic Ocean before 17 February. |
| Kate | United Kingdom | The ship was driven ashore in the Pearl Islands before 6 February. |
| Marco Polo | United Kingdom | The ship was driven ashore at Melbourne, Australia. All on board were rescued. |
| Matador | United Kingdom | The ship was driven ashore in the Dardanelles. She was on a voyage from Liverpool to Constantinople, Ottoman Empire. She was refloated and completed her voyage, arriving on 7 February. |
| Mazeppa | United Kingdom | The barque capsized in the Atlantic Ocean before 4 February with the loss of all hands. She was on a voyage from Liverpool to Geelong, Victoria. |
| Napoleon | France | The barque was abandoned in the North Sea off the coast of Friesland, Netherlands before 24 February. She was driven ashore on "Inist" on 28 February.. |
| Queen of the Isles | United Kingdom | The brig was wrecked north of Cape Kalagua, on the west coast of the Black Sea before 2 February with the loss of all but one of her crew. She was on a voyage from Galaţi, Ottoman Empire to a British port. |
| Saucy Jack | United Kingdom | The ship foundered in the North Sea off the Belgian coast on or before 18 February. |
| Tolvo, or Trova | United Kingdom | The brig was wrecked north of Cape Kalagua before 2 February. Her crew were rescued. |
| Ventus | Norway | The ship was driven ashore at Trondheim. She was refloated on 15 February and taken in to Drontheim. |
| Victory | (United Kingdom of Great Britain and Ireland) British North America | The barque was abandoned in the Atlantic Ocean. Her crew were rescued by Royal Saxon (United States). Victory was on a voyage from Saint John, New Brunswick to London. |
| Walter Rose | (United Kingdom of Great Britain and Ireland) British North America | The schooner was abandoned in the Atlantic Ocean. Her crew were rescued by Cornelia (United Kingdom). Walter Rose was on a voyage from Yarmouth, Nova Scotia to the West Indies. |
| Wolf's Cove | United Kingdom | The ship was driven ashore at Stromness, Orkney Islands. She was refloated on 22 February and resumed her voyage. |
