= Harold Glanville (junior) =

British politician

Harold James Abbott Glanville (26 June 1884 – 21 February 1966) was a British Liberal Party politician.

Born in London, Glanville was the son of Harold Glanville, himself a Liberal Party politician, who was later elected to Parliament. Glanville junior studied at Aske's School and gradually rose to political prominence.

In 1918, Glanville was a member of the War Pensions Committee, and the following year, he was elected to London County Council, representing Bermondsey West. He lost his seat in 1922, and subsequently held various positions, including becoming a magistrate, sitting on the Children's Court Panel, London Licensing Planning Committee and Lord Chancellor's Advisory Committee. During World War II, he served on the London Ministry of Information Committee.

In his spare time, Glanville was a member of the National Liberal Club, serving as its chairman from 1944 until 1963, and subsequently as its president. He also served as president of the London Liberal Federation, and as president of the Liberal Party in 1959/60.

Party political offices
Preceded by Arthur Comyns Carr	President of the Liberal Party; 1959–1960	Succeeded by Andrew Murray
