= John Gilbert (alderman) =

British politician (1871–1934)

John William Gilbert
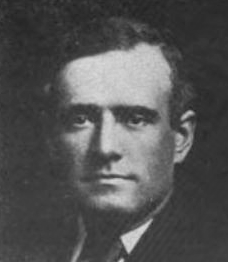
- Born: 23 October 1871; Southwark, England
- Died: 21 December 1934 (aged 63); Camberwell, England
- Education: University of London
- Occupation: Politician

Sir John William Gilbert KBE, KCSG, KSS, JP (23 October 1871 – 21 December 1934) was an alderman of the London County Council (LCC) from 1910 until his death. He served in various roles within the council, with organisations associated with the poor, with education and with administration in London and on organisations related to the Catholic Church.

== Life ==
Gilbert was born in Southwark as the youngest son of James Gilbert. He attended school at St. Joseph's Academy, Kensington and St. Joseph's College, Clapham and Tooting and gained a Bachelor of Arts degree from University of London in 1891 before becoming a school teacher. He was Assistant Master of secondary schools, London from 1891 to 1895.

Having been co-opted to the LCC's education committee in 1908, he was elected an alderman of the council in 1910. For the LCC, he served as the Chair of the education committee (1913–17 and 1928–32), the Chair of the general purpose committee (1921–27) and as Vice-chairman (1917–18) and Chairman (1920–21) of the full council.

He served as a member of the University of London's senate (1921–29) and court (1929–34). He was a member of the Burnham committee (1931–34) and the London Passenger Transport Board (1933–34).

Gilbert was actively engaged in social work in south London. In 1896 he became secretary of the Providence Row Night Home and Refuge, and was at various times manager of Catholic schools in and near London. He was a member of the Poor Law Inspectors' Advisory Committee on Homeless Poor, and the Executive Committee of the Southwark Rescue Society.

He was a contributor to the Catholic Truth Society, The Month, The Tablet, and the Catholic Encyclopedia.

Gilbert never married and he died at his home in Denmark Hill on 21 December 1934.

== Honours ==
For his work with Catholic organisations, Gilbert was appointed Knight of the Order of St. Sylvester by Pope Pius X in 1909 and Knight Commander of the Order of St. Gregory the Great by Pope Benedict XV in 1920.

In the 1921 New Year Honours List, Gilbert was appointed a Knight Commander of the Order of the British Empire.

He was awarded an honorary doctorate by the University of London in 1932.

== See also ==
- List of chairmen of the London County Council

Political offices
Preceded by Hayes Fisher, 1st Baron Downham	Chairman of the London County Council; 1920 – 1921	Succeeded by Percy Simmons
