= Arthur Comyns Carr =

British Liberal politician and lawyer

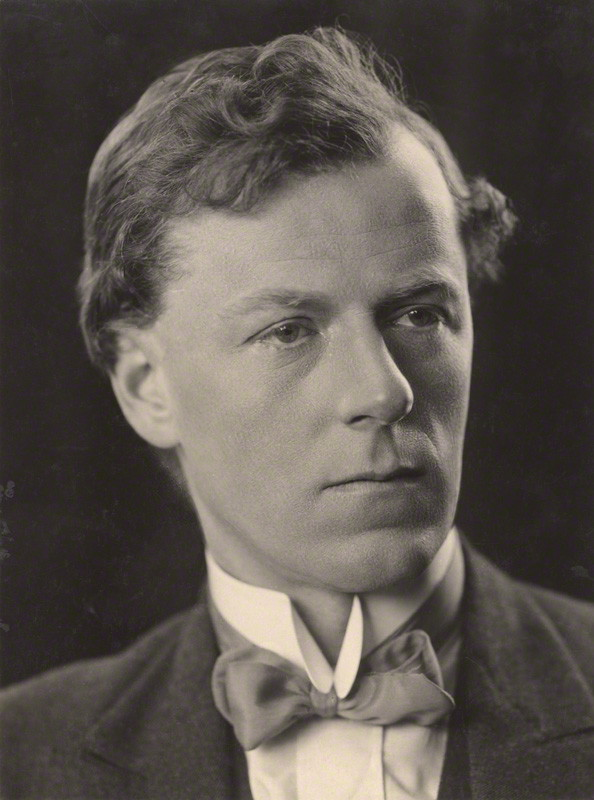
Arthur Comyns Carr, circa 1914

Sir Arthur Strettell Comyns Carr (19 September 1882 – 20 April 1965) was a British Liberal politician and lawyer.

== Family and education ==
Comyns Carr was the son of J. Comyns Carr, a dramatist and art critic. His mother, Alice Comyns Carr (1850–1927), was a costume designer for the theatre. He was born in Marylebone and educated at Winchester College and Trinity College, Oxford.

In 1907, he married Cicely Raikes Bromage, the daughter of a clergyman. They had three sons including Richard Strettell Comyns Carr, the second husband of the avant garde English novelist Barbara Comyns Carr.

== Career ==
In 1908, Comyns Carr was called to the Bar at Gray's Inn. He became a King's Counsel in 1924, a Bencher of the Inn in 1938, and, eventually, Treasurer in 1951. Comyns Carr's reputation as a barrister was confirmed in a libel action brought by Horatio Bottomley against an associate named Reuben Bigland.

Carr's cross-examination of Bottomley and another key witness destroyed his case and was instrumental in Bottomley's eventual imprisonment on charges of fraud and his expulsion from the House of Commons.

Comyns Carr later began to specialize in the law relating to local taxation and as a result of appearing in landmark rating appeals he was engaged as counsel to government departments. He also became an expert in the subject of national insurance. Much later Comyns Carr was a prosecutor in trials of German and Japanese war criminals, including serving as senior prosecutor at the trial of Erich von Manstein in 1949, and he was knighted for this work in 1949.

== War service ==
At the outbreak of the First World War Comyns Carr he joined the Royal Naval Volunteer Reserve and later served on the staff at the Ministry of Munitions. He also acted as an adviser to the Ministry of Reconstruction. In the last months of the war he joined the army as a private soldier but did not serve overseas.

== Politics ==
Comyns Carr's expertise in National Insurance led him to co-author a book on the subject in 1912 to which David Lloyd George wrote the preface. He was a member of the Liberal land inquiry committee of 1912 and also sat on the land acquisition committee in 1917.

His ambition to become a Liberal Member of Parliament (MP) led Comyns Carr to stand for Parliament on eleven occasions in all. He first stood for election in 1918 in St Pancras South West against a Conservative opponent who had received the Coalition Coupon and fought the same seat again in 1922.

At the 1923 general election Comyns Carr had his only success, becoming Liberal MP for Islington East turning a Unionist majority of nearly 4,000 into a Liberal majority of 1,632 but he lost the seat at the general election of 1924 like many other Liberals swept away as British politics seemed to be reverting to its traditional two party model. In 1928, he was Liberal candidate at the by-election for the constituency of Ilford and fought the seat again in the general election of the following year.

In 1930, Comyns Carr published an influential and controversial booklet, Escape from the Dole, which gained him significant public attention. In it he queried the policy of spending large sums of money supporting the unemployed when the government could be investing in providing work for them. He then challenged Winston Churchill in his constituency at Epping in the 1931 general election and in 1935 he suffered his heaviest defeat ever at Nottingham East.

In June 1936, he was elected to serve on the Liberal Party Council. He stood again in 1945 when he lost at Shrewsbury. In October 1945, he was a candidate at another by-election, this time in the City of London.

== Other public appointments ==
In later life Comyns Carr served as chairman of the Foreign Compensation Commission (1950–1958) and was a president of the Institute of Industrial Administration and of the Association of Approved Societies. He was also President of the Liberal Party in 1958–59. Comyns-Carr was also one of the British prosecutors at the Tokyo Trials.

== Death ==
He died in Hampstead on 20 April 1965, aged 82. A memorial service was held for him in the chapel of Gray's Inn on 24 May 1965.

== Ancestry ==
Ancestors of Arthur Comyns Carr

4. Jonathan Carr (1808-1881)
2. Joseph William Comyns Carr
5. Catherine Grace Comyns (d. 1876)
1. Arthur Comyns Carr
24. John Strettell
12. Amos Strettell (1782-1855)
25. Mary
6. Rev. Alfred Baker Strettell (1817-1904)
26. John Utterson
13. Harriet Eliza Utterson (1784-1863), sister of Edward Vernon Utterson
27. Elizabeth Rowe
3. Alice Laura Strettell (1850–1927)
28. George Vansittart
14. Rev. Edward Vansittart-Neale (1769-1850)
29. Sarah Stonhouse (1745-1819)
7. Laura Vansittart-Neale (1816-1899)
30. Isaac Spooner
15. Anne Spooner (1780-1873)
31. Barbara Gough-Calthorpe (1746-1826), matrineal descendant of Anne of York, Duchess of Exeter

Parliament of the United Kingdom
Preceded by Austin Hudson	Member of Parliament for Islington East; 1923–1924	Succeeded by Robert Tasker
Party political offices
Preceded by Nathaniel Micklem	President of the Liberal Party; 1958–1959	Succeeded by Harold Glanville
