= Ewart Culpin =

British politician and town planner (1877–1946)

Chairman of London County Council
- In office 1938–1939
- Preceded by: Harry Snell, 1st Baron Snell
- Succeeded by: Eveline Lowe

Vice-Chairman of London County Council
- In office 1934–1937
- Preceded by: Cyril Jacobs
- Succeeded by: Emil Davies

London County Councillor for Battersea North
- In office 1937–1946
- Preceded by: Caroline Ganley
- Succeeded by: J. S. Wilkie

Personal details
- Born: 3 December 1877
- Died: 1 December 1946 (aged 68)
- Party: Labour
- Education: Alleynes Grammar School and Hitchin Grammar School

Ewart Gladstone Culpin (3 December 1877 – 1 December 1946) was a British Labour Party politician and town planner who served as the Chairman of London County Council.

== Biography ==
The son of Ben Ephraim Lamartine and Eliza Culpin, Ewart attended Alleynes Grammar School and Hitchin Grammar School. He became a journalist, based in Letchworth, where he developed an interest in town planning and the garden city movement. In 1906, he was appointed as secretary of the Garden City Association, and in 1907 he founded the International Garden Cities and Town Planning Association. Enthusiastic about the positions, in his spare time he qualified as a town planner and as an architect. Through the association, he promoted low-density housing schemes, whether designed as new towns or as extensions to existing ones, and in 1913 he toured the United States speaking on this topic. His approach was opposed by Ebenezer Howard, founder of the movement, and in 1918 he was replaced by Charles Purdom, who, like Howard, championed only new town developments.

After World War I, Culpin was president of the Belgian Society for the Reconstruction of Belgium, and he chaired the Standing Conference on London Regional Planning from 1926 until his death. In 1930, he was the president of the Incorporated Association of Architects and Surveyors, while in 1937/8 he was president of the Town Planning Institute. He also became a Fellow of the Royal Institute of British Architects.

Culpin became active in the Labour Party, for which he stood unsuccessfully in Islington North at the 1924 United Kingdom general election. In 1925, he was appointed to London County Council as an alderman, serving until 1937, when he moved to become a councillor in Battersea North. He chaired the council from 1938 to 1939.

Culpin received several honours, including becoming an officer of the Belgian Order of the Crown, a grand officer of the Romanian Order of the Crown, and a commander of the Dahomean Order of the Black Star.

Civic offices
Preceded by Harry Snell	Chairman of London County Council; 1938–1939	Succeeded by Eveline Lowe
Non-profit organization positions
Preceded by Thomas Adams	Secretary of the Garden City Association; 1906–1918	Succeeded by Charles Purdom
