= Ada Salter =

English social reformer, environmentalist, pacifist and Quaker (1866-1942)

Ada Brown
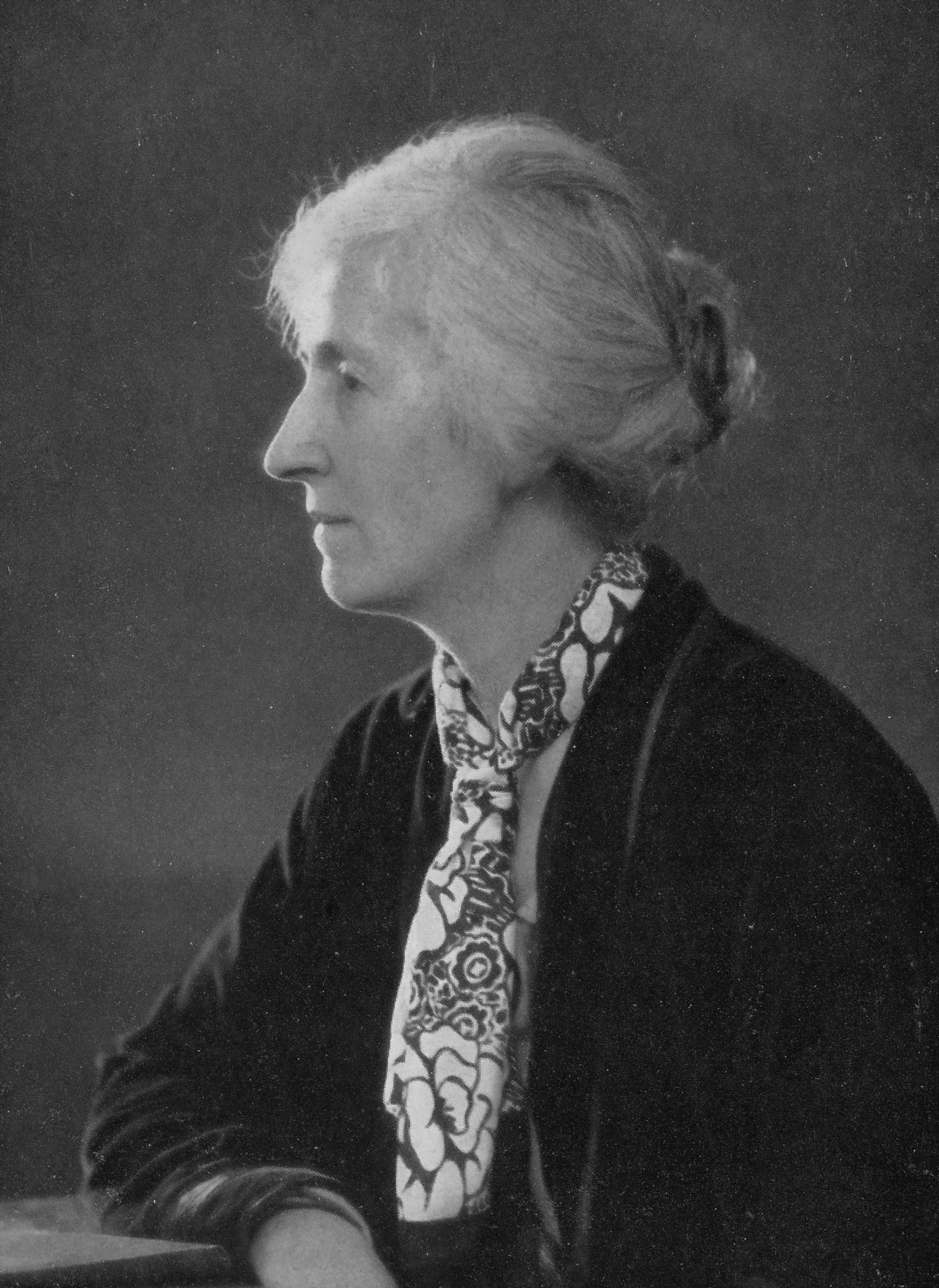
- Ada Salter (née Brown)
- Born: 20 July 1866; Raunds, Northamptonshire, England
- Died: 4 December 1942 (aged 76); London, England
- Known for: Co-founder Women's Labour League
- Spouse: Alfred Salter (m. 1900; died 1942)
- Children: 1

Ada Salter (née Brown; 20 July 1866 – 4 December 1942) was an English social reformer, environmentalist, pacifist and Quaker, President of the Women's Labour League and President of the National Gardens Guild. She was one of the first women councillors in London, the first woman mayor in London and the first Labour woman mayor in the British Isles.

== Early life and marriage ==
Ada Brown was born on 20 July 1866 into a Methodist family in Raunds, Northamptonshire. She had several sisters - Mary, Beatrice, Alice and Adelaide - and a brother, Richard, who became a minister in Lancaster. Ada Brown was active in the Methodist church and on the radical wing of the Liberal Party before she moved to London. There she joined the West London Mission in Bloomsbury to work as a 'Sister of the People' in the slums of St Pancras. The Sisters were run by Katherine Hughes, wife of the mission's founder Hugh Price Hughes and an inspirational Christian socialist in her own right. In 1897, after the marriage of her sister Mary Baldwin, Ada transferred to the Bermondsey Settlement, in south-east London. There she met Alfred Salter, agnostic and socialist, a resident engaged in medical research into infectious diseases on a farm in Sudbury (now Wembley), Middlesex. Under her influence, Alfred converted to Christianity and joined the Liberal Party. They both committed to the Society of Friends (Quakers) and started to attend the Deptford Meeting. They were married in Raunds on 22 August 1900.

== Bermondsey ==
Ada had always insisted on living in the slums, among the poor, ever since arriving in London. Now she was equally insistent on staying in Bermondsey, a place she had fallen in love with despite its drab poverty. Alfred, who was such a brilliant doctor he could have made a fortune as a consultant, therefore set up a GP's medical practice in Jamaica Road. He charged poorer patients only a small sum and the poorest nothing at all. Ada continued as a social worker at Bermondsey Settlement, where she already had a high reputation for the clubs she ran, especially those for the "roughest and toughest" of teenage girls. In 1902 she temporarily gave up work when the couple's only child, Ada Joyce, was born.

Ada was President of the Women's Liberal Party in Bermondsey and Rotherhithe but in 1906 she left the Liberal Party when it failed to honour its promise of granting the vote to women and soon joined the Independent Labour Party. The ILP was the political party most favourable to the rights of women and wanted to stand women candidates, including Ada, at the next council elections. This put Alfred, a Liberal councillor on the London County Council (LCC), into an awkward position. In 1908 therefore he also left the Liberals, to found an ILP branch in Bermondsey. Once again it was Ada who had blazed the trail for him to follow. In November 1909 Ada was elected to the borough council for the ILP, becoming the first woman councillor in Bermondsey, first Labour councillor in Bermondsey, and one of the first women councillors in London. However, in 1910, personal tragedy struck when the Salters' only child, Joyce, then eight years old, died of scarlet fever in one of the periodic epidemics that swept through the slums, having been infected twice before. Joyce's photo was daily decorated with flowers and ivy leaves in Alfred's study.

Ada responded by throwing herself into the work of the Women's Labour League, which she had co-founded in 1906 with Margaret MacDonald, wife of Labour's rising star, James Ramsay MacDonald. She rose to be first its National Treasurer and then in 1914 its National President, the leader of all the Labour Party women in Britain. The WLL was not tied to any particular suffragist movement but Ada supported the non-violent Women's Freedom League, led by her friend Charlotte Despard, rather than endorse the tactics of the Women's Social and Political Union led by Emmeline Pankhurst.

In the WLL Ada did pioneering research work on social housing, seeking not only to demolish the slums but to put in their place model council houses (often derided by her opponents as utopian) built specifically with the needs of working-class women in mind. To expedite demolition, she and her WLL comrades called for a Green Belt around London, to absorb the excess population from the slums. Ada followed John Ruskin in believing that fresh air and contact with nature improved people not only physically but mentally and morally. She became a proponent of urban gardening, and a pioneer of organised campaigning against air pollution in London.

What brought her the greatest renown before 1914 was, however, the Bermondsey Uprising of 1911. She had in 1910 started to recruit women in the local factories to a trade union, the National Federation of Women Workers, led by Mary Macarthur. At first the results were disappointing, but in August 1911, 14,000 women walked out on strike in protest against terrible working conditions. They won. Ada was hailed by the ILP and the WLL as the inspiration of this big step forward for women's rights at work (though she was only one factor) and for this, as well as for the huge organisational effort including what we would now consider as family food banks during the dockers' strike of 1912 (see Ben Tillett), she was honoured by the trade unions which are known today as Unite and the GMB. Ada spoke out for equality among workers, not just in the workplace but in the labour movement:

“When the trades union movement fully realises that all the workers, men and women, youth and maidens, were members one of another, then they will hear more than the rumble of revolution in the distance, the revolution will be here.”

== The Great War and pacifist work ==
Ada had always since her youth opposed war and becoming a Quaker had fortified her commitment to peace. For her, therefore, 1914 was a catastrophe. She was a founding member of the Women's International League for Peace and Freedom (WILPF) and from 1916 she also worked with Alfred for the No Conscription Fellowship. Although the British government prevented her from attending the Hague peace conference in 1915, she managed to reach Berne, Switzerland, as the representative of the ILP, to attend Third International Socialist Women's Conference which organised opposition to the First World War. There she came up against Lenin, who was determined to get the conference to vote for armed revolution. Ada and the WLL delegate, Margaret Bondfield, stood their ground and Lenin was defeated. At the end of the war she was amongst the British delegations to the Women's International League congresses in Zürich (1919) and Vienna. Her international position was that of the Vienna International, which tried to mediate between the Second International (Labour) and the Third International (Communist) but failed to reconcile them.

== The great peace ==
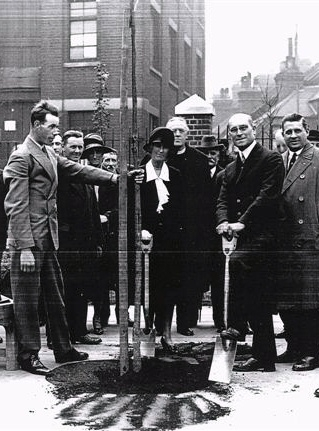
Ada opens a playground by planting a tree. Alfred is on her left.

Re-elected to Bermondsey Council in 1919, Ada was appointed Mayor in 1922, making her the first woman mayor in London and first Labour woman mayor in Britain. Ada refused all the trappings of mayoral insignia or robes, and replaced the Union Jack with a red flag with symbols of Bermondsey, St Olave and Rotherhithe on the town hall. She had launched in 1920 her famous Beautification Committee and now she launched her housing campaign, demolishing the slums that could be demolished and beautifying the slums that could not. By the 1930s she had planted 9000 trees, decorated buildings with window-boxes, and filled all open spaces with flowers, some 60,000 plants. Looking not only for beautification of streets but for beautification of every individual's body, mind and soul, she organised all over the borough music concerts, art competitions, games, sports and children's playgrounds. After a fierce political battle she built her beautiful 'utopian' council houses in Wilson Grove, designed by Ewart Culpin, where they still stand today as exemplary housing. Her electoral results were phenomenal, regularly achieving the highest vote of any councillor in London. When her time in office was over she had hardly spent any of the mayoral 'expenses' allowance. At the 1925 London County Council election, she was elected to represent Hackney South. In 1932 she was elected National President of the National Gardens Guild. Finally, after the 1934 London County Council election, when Labour led by Herbert Morrison took control, Ada was able to spread her green socialist ideals to every corner of the capital. The Green Belt was secured by law in 1938.

Ada felt the 1939 war as much a catastrophe as the 1914 one. In 1942, Ada and Alfred were bombed out of their home in Storks Road after refusing to leave Bermondsey to its fate, as others did. She died, cared for by her sisters, in Balham Park Road, Battersea, on 4 December 1942 and was accorded a Quaker funeral at Peckham Meeting-House, where she was an elder. There was also a memorial service at her Church of England parish church of St James Bermondsey. Her widower said a month later: "The loneliness grows deeper and has not lessened in the slightest with the lapse of time. Sometimes it is almost unbearable, but I have to learn to bear it."

== Personal beliefs ==
Ada Salter's personal beliefs evolved from the social liberalism of Hugh and Katherine Hughes to the ethical socialism of the ILP. Like Alfred, she was an admirer of Giuseppe Mazzini and of his clarion call for the unity and equality of all humanity. This chimed in with her Quaker belief that "there is something of God in everyone." In practice what she meant by 'ethical' was human or humanitarian, and what she meant by 'socialism' was a worldwide network of co-operative enterprises. She believed that people would become truly human only by valuing nature and valuing each other. On valuing nature her famous slogan was: "The cultivation of flowers and trees is a civic duty." As for valuing others, she believed this depended not only on individual effort but also entailed the emancipation of women and workers, who ought to be natural allies against oppression. She believed too that ethical socialism secured personal happiness, provided that the ethical socialist followed what was true as well as valuing others: "Act according to truth and principle." she advised, "If one does that, there will be no need ever to be anxious or distraught."

After her death in the Friends (Quakers) Quarterly Examiner it was said: 'Socialism in action: that is what she was."

== Memorials to Alfred and Ada Salter ==
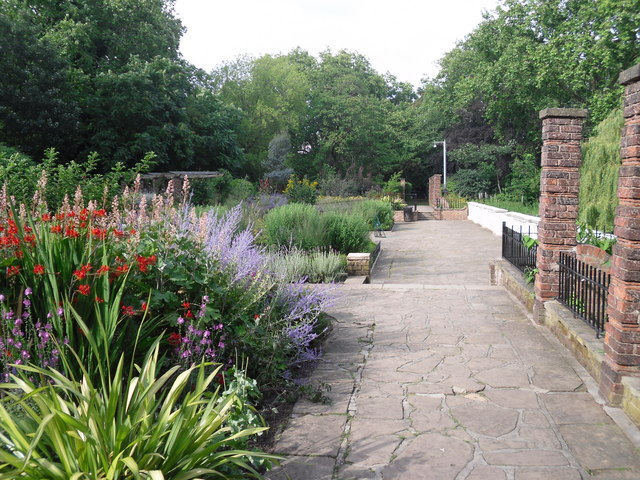
Ada Salter Garden

A beautiful garden, overlooking a lake, designed and supervised by Ada herself, was opened in 1936 within Southwark Park, in the Old Surrey Docks area. It was spontaneously referred to by locals as the 'Ada Salter Garden' and in 1943 the name was formally recognised by the LCC.

The Alfred Salter Primary School was opened in 1995 to meet the growing demand for school places in Rotherhithe, due to the redevelopment of the old docks. The Alfred Salter Bridge is a footbridge leading off Watermans Lane, between Stave Hill and Redriff Road, near Greenland Dock as part of the Russia Dock Woodland.

A set of statues was commissioned in 1991, depicting Dr Salter sitting on a bench facing the Thames, little Joyce standing by the river, with a cat perched on the wall. In November 2011 these were stolen, presumably for the value of the bronze. The Salter Statues Campaign group raised £60,000, which Southwark Council matched, to pay for replacement statues by Diane Gorvin, and these were unveiled on 30 November 2014. Ada's statue was only the 15th public statue in London to a woman.

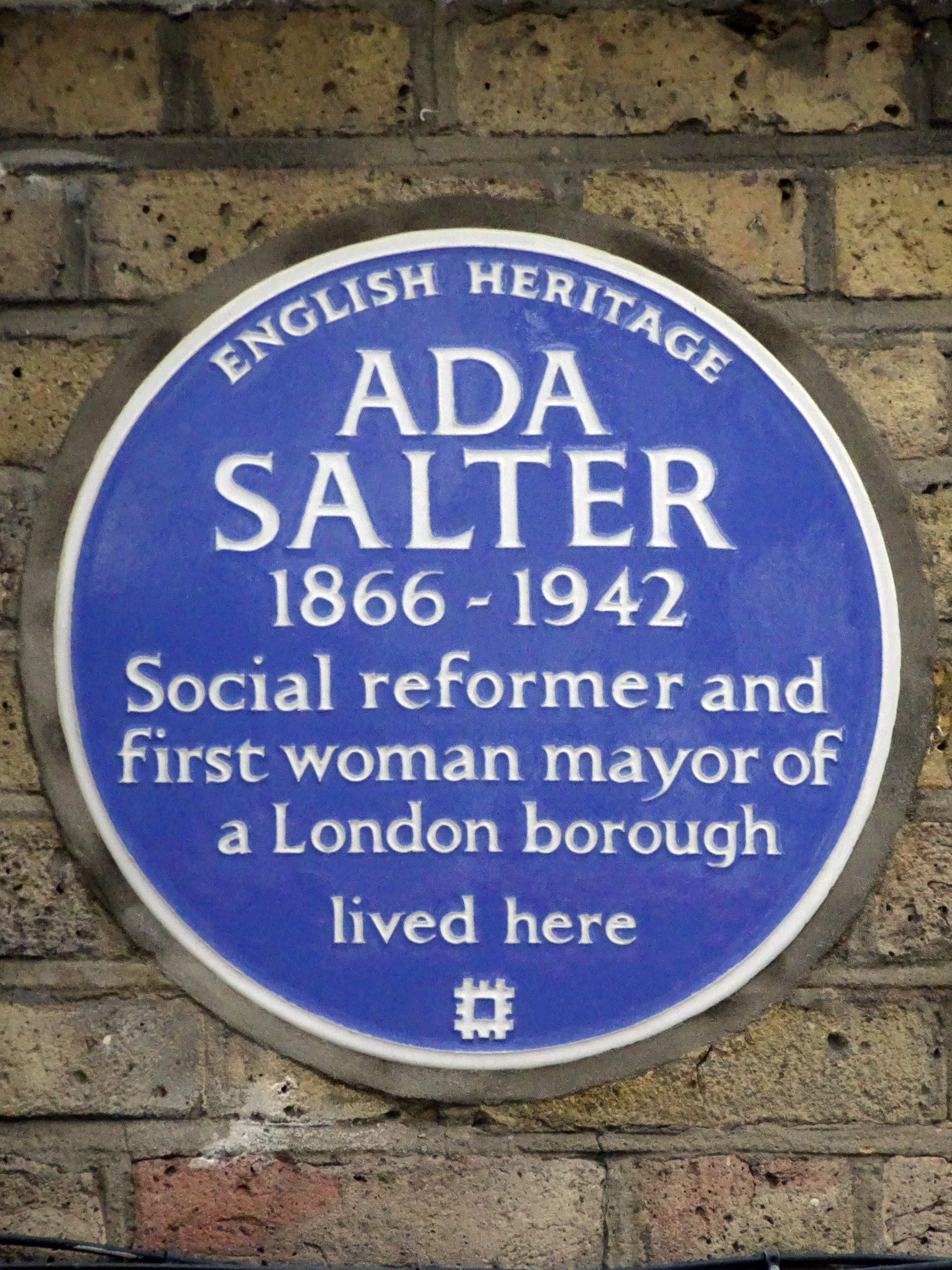
Blue plaque for ADA SALTER 1866–1942 Social reformer and first woman mayor of a London borough lived here

A Salter Memorial Lecture is promoted by the Quaker Socialist Society each year as a fringe event at the Britain Yearly Meeting of the Religious Society of Friends (Quakers). The Ada Salter room at Friends House, London, UK is named after her.

In 2015 a play about Ada Salter, Red Flag over Bermondsey, by Lynn Morris was performed all over the country. In 2016 her first full biography appeared: Ada Salter, Pioneer of Ethical Socialism by Graham Taylor.

In January 2023, English Heritage announced that a blue plaque would be unveiled later that year in Southwark which Salter had lived in during the late 1890s. The plaque was unveiled in March 2023 at 149 Lower Road in Rotherhithe where Salter lived in the late 1890.

== See also ==
- List of peace activists

== Bibliography ==
- Brockway, Fenner: Bermondsey Story: the Life of Alfred Salter (1949), Allen & Unwin.
- Hannam, June & Hunt, Karen: Socialist Women: 1880s to 1920s (2002)
- Collette, Christine: The Newer Eve: Women, Feminists and the Labour Party (2009).
- Oldfield, Sybil: Salter, Ada (1866-1942) in Oxford Dictionary of National Biography.
- Howell, David: Salter, Alfred (1873-1945) in Oxford Dictionary of National Biography.
- Taylor, Graham: Ada Salter: Pioneer of Ethical Socialism (2016), Lawrence & Wishart.

Civic offices
Preceded by William Charles Bustin	Mayor of Bermondsey; 1922–1923	Succeeded by William Joseph Craigie
