= Constance Maud =

- Born: Constance Elizabeth Maud; 11 March 1856; Brighton, Sussex, England
- Died: 11 May 1929 (aged 73); Chelsea, London, England
- Known for: Writer and suffragette

Constance Elizabeth Maud (11 March 1856 – 11 May 1929) was a British writer and suffragette.

== Early life ==
Constance Elizabeth Maud was born in 1857, the elder daughter of Rev Henry Landon Maud, MA, rector at All Saints’ Church, Sanderstead, Surrey between 1892 and 1901. Her father had been elected a scholar of Trinity College, Cambridge, at the Westminster School elections, 1846 (source: Ecclesiastical Gazette). Charlotte Maud was educated in France and later lived at the family homes in France and in her flat in Chelsea.

== Writing ==
She published books from 1895, was a member of the Women Writers' Suffrage League and contributed to many suffrage publications including the suffragist newspaper Votes for Women.

She became a member of The Women's Social and Political Union (WSPU) in 1908 (source: The Women's Suffrage Movement: A Reference Guide 1866–1928, Elizabeth Crawford). She is best known as the author of No Surrender in 1911, a novel about the struggle for votes for women.

No Surrender is considered to be an important addition to literature about the campaign for votes for women: "Maud's fast-paced tale of prewar suffrage activism enrich[es] a literary field long impoverished by a lack of pro-suffrage fiction". The book was used as a tool by suffragettes in championing their cause and has since become an important social document of its time.

No Surrender was reviewed by suffragette Emily Davison in 1911. She said "It is a book which breathes the very spirit of our Women’s Movement." Charlotte Despard, the president of the Women's Freedom League and the editor of The Vote called it "The best Suffrage novel I have ever read."

No Surrender was re-published by Persephone Books in 2011, to mark the 100th anniversary of its original publication.

== Published books ==
- An English Girl in Paris (1902)
- My French Friends
- Felicity in France (1906)
- Angélique (1912)
- My French Year (1917)
- A Daughter of France (1908)
- No Surrender (1911)
- Sparks Among the Stubble (1924)
