= John Hutton (publisher) =

British publisher and politician

Sir John Hutton
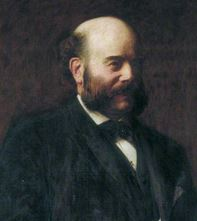
- Portrait of Sir John Hutton by Leonard Watts
- Born: 14 October 1841
- Died: 31 May 1903 (aged 61)
- Resting place: Highgate Cemetery
- Occupations: Publisher and Politician
- Known for: Chairmanship of the LCC

Sir John Hutton (14 October 1841 – 31 May 1903) was a publisher and Chairman of the London County Council between 1892 and 1895.

== Career ==
Hutton was a proprietor and publisher of various newspapers and journals, including the Eclipse, Sporting Life and the ABC Railway Guide.

He became a London County Councillor, rising to become chairman in 1892, a post he held for three years. He was a campaigner for parks, opening to the public: Hackney Marshes (1893), Bishop's Park (1893), Lincoln's Inn Fields (1895).

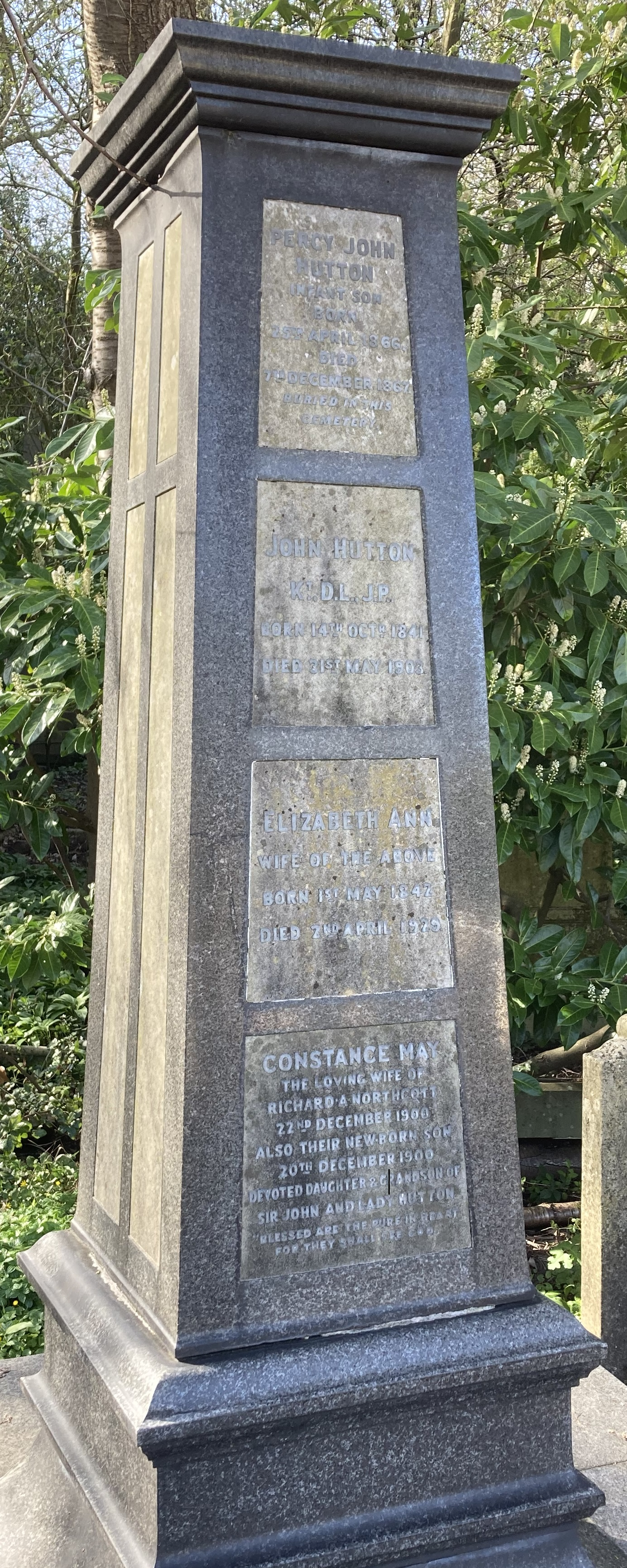
Family grave of Sir John Hutton in Highgate Cemetery

== Personal life ==
John Hutton was born in London on 14 October 1841. In 1865 he married Elizabeth Ann Neale (1 May 1842 – 2 April 1929) and they had five children: Percy John (1866-7), Ernest (b.1869), Constance May (b.1871), Winifred (b.1873) and Montagu (b.1876).

Constance was the subject of widely reported slander case in 1897 when a French naval officer, Rene Martin Fortris accused her father of falsely stating that Fortris had been making unwelcome advances towards his daughter for two years. According to Fortris this led to Sir Frederick Pollock and John Norbury declining his application for membership of the London Fencing Club. The court was told that Fortris had sent Lady Hutton a piece of blood stained material as a Christmas present with a note claiming that he had tried to commit suicide. The jury was unimpressed by his case and found in favour of Sir John Hutton. Constance later married Richard Northcott.

Hutton was knighted in 1894 and died on 31 May 1903. He is buried in a family grave on the west side of Highgate Cemetery.
