= Alice Comyns Carr =

British costume designer and writer (1850–1927)

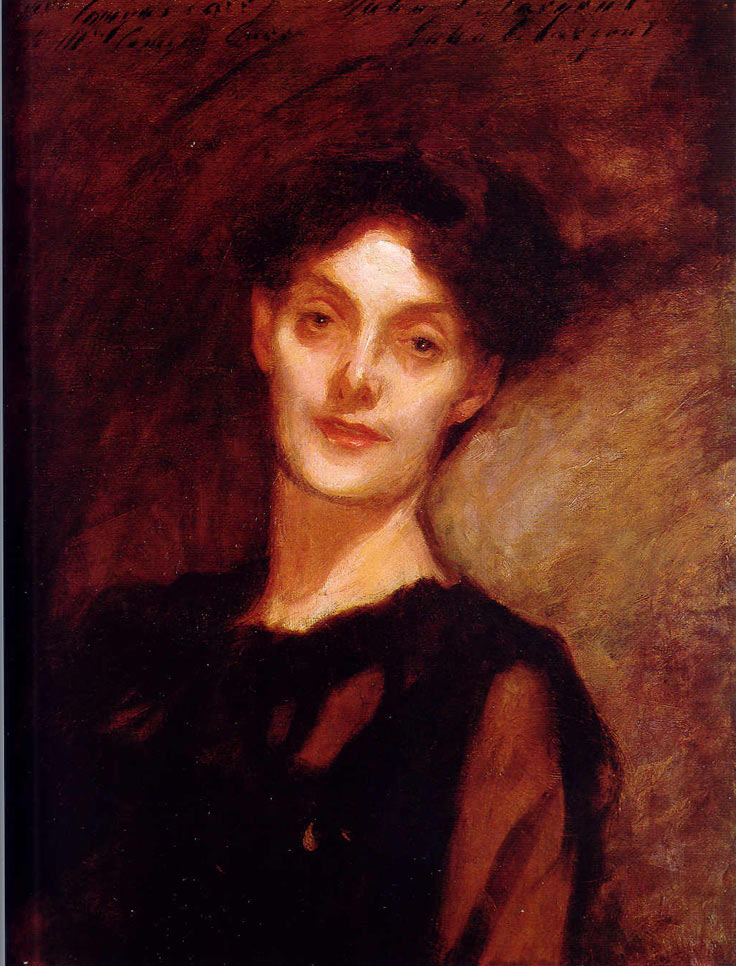
- John Singer Sargent (c. 1889), "Mrs. J. W. Comyns Carr"
- Born: Alice Laura Vansittart Strettell; 1 January 1850; Taplow, Buckinghamshire, UKGBI
- Died: 11 October 1927 (aged 77); Hampstead, London, UK
- Resting place: Highgate Cemetery
- Occupation: Costume designer
- Spouse: J. Comyns Carr (m. 1873; died 1916)
- Children: 3, including Arthur Comyns Carr
- Relatives: Alma Strettell (sister); Edward Vansittart Neale (uncle)

Alice Laura Vansittart Comyns Carr (née Strettell; 1 January 1850 – 11 October 1927), was a British theatrical costume designer and writer. A leading figure in the Aesthetic dress movement, Carr was the chief costume designer for the actress Ellen Terry from 1886 to 1902.

== Early life and family ==
Carr was born Alice Laura Vansittart Strettell on 1 January 1850 in Taplow, Buckinghamshire to The Rev Alfred Baker Strettell (1817–1904), the curate of Taplow, and Laura Vansittart Strettell (née Neale; 1816–1888). The second of three siblings, Carr was the elder sister of the poet, folklorist and translator Alma Strettell. Carr was the maternal niece of Edward Vansittart Neale, a leader in the Christian Socialist movement.

In 1851, Carr's father was appointed the British consular chaplain in Genoa and the family settled in the city. Raised in Italy, Carr was sent to a boarding school in Brighton during her late teens.

== Career ==
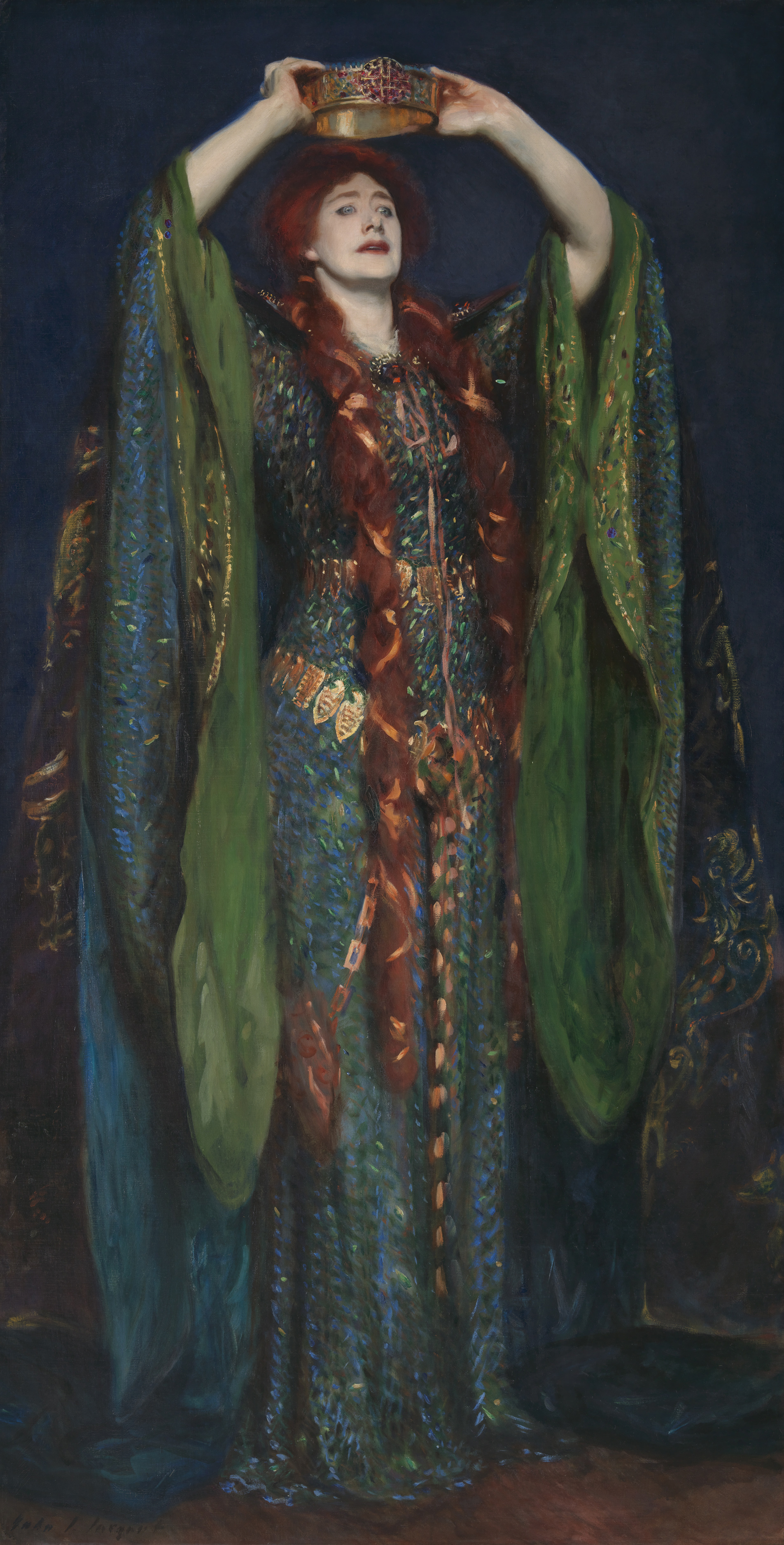
Ellen Terry as Lady Macbeth, by John Singer Sargent, 1889. Terry is wearing the Carr-Nettleship iridescent dress.

As a costume designer, Carr was associated with the Aesthetic dress movement and its championship of looser, more flowing garments with theatrical touches such as lace and embroidery. It was rumored that she was the inspiration behind the comic figure of "Mrs Cimabue Brown" that the cartoonist George du Maurier invented to mock the Aestheticists in some of his drawings for Punch magazine.

For two decades, Carr was actor Ellen Terry's chief costume designer, succeeding Patience Harris. Carr began consulting with Terry and Harris in 1882, but the two designers' tastes didn't align well, and Harris resigned in 1887 following disagreements over costumes for the plays Henry VIII and The Amber Heart. The latter became the first production on which Carr had primary responsibility for Terry's costumes, though her influence is clear in designs as early as the 1885 production of Faust. Carr and Terry continued working together until 1902, when Terry left the Lyceum Theatre.

One of Carr's best-known works is a costume that used beetle wings to create an iridescent effect worn by Terry as Lady Macbeth in the Shakespeare play Macbeth. It was designed by Carr and crocheted by dressmaker Ada Nettleship to simulate a soft chain mail with also something of an effect of serpent scales. Nettleship had used beetle wings in some of her earlier designs, and this dress employed over 1,000 beetle wings. The restored costume is now on display in Terry's home, Smallhythe Place, near Tenterden in Kent. The American artist John Singer Sargent painted Terry in the dress in 1889. Sargent was a friend of Carr and painted her portrait around the same time.

Carr later collaborated with Nettleship to make another dress for Terry, this time for a production of Henry VIII. In 1895, she collaborated with the artist Edward Burne-Jones on costumes for a production of the play King Arthur starring Henry Irving.

== Writings ==
Carr wrote an analysis of fashion for The Woman's World magazine after Oscar Wilde took over the editorship in 1887. Carr published a volume of reminiscences in 1926. In it, she wrote, "I had long been accustomed to supporting a certain amount of ridicule in the matter of clothes, because in the days when bustles and skin-tight dresses were the fashion, and a twenty-inch waist the aim of every self-respecting woman, my frocks followed the simple, straight line as waistless as those of today."

Carr also wrote several books, including North Italian Folk: Sketches of Town and Country Life (1878), Margaret Maliphant (1889), and The Arm of the Lord (1899).

== Personal life ==
On 15 December 1873, Carr married J. Comyns Carr, a writer, theatre manager and director of the Grosvenor Gallery. The couple had three children including Sir Arthur Comyns Carr, a barrister and Liberal Party politician.

On 11 October 1927, Carr died at her home in Hampstead, London. Carr was buried at Highgate Cemetery.
