= Alma Strettell =

British translator and poet

Alma Strettel
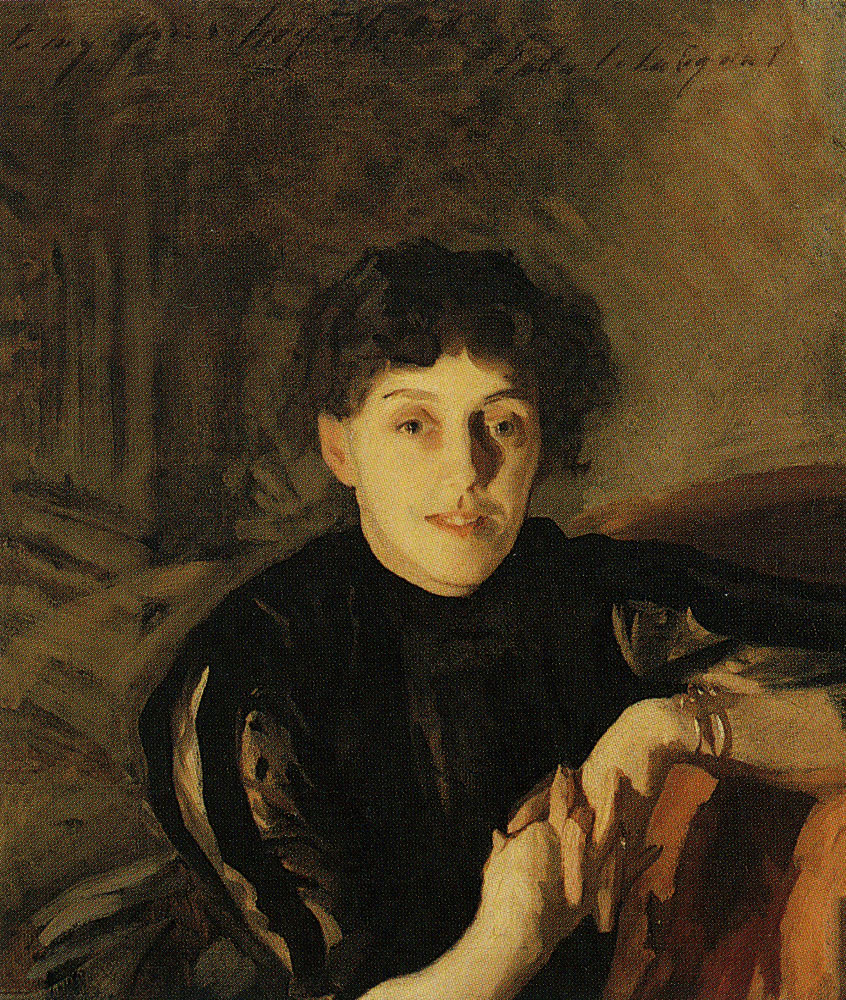
- Born: Alma Gertrude Vansittart Strettell; 1853; Genoa
- Died: 1939 (aged 85–86); Boston
- Other names: Alma Gertrude Vansittart Harrison
- Citizenship: British
- Occupations: Translator, poet

Alma Gertrude Vansittart Harrison (née Strettell; 1853–1939) was a British translator and poet known for her translations of folk songs, folk tales, and poems from Greek, Romanian, French, Provençal, German, Norwegian, and other languages.

== Early life and family ==
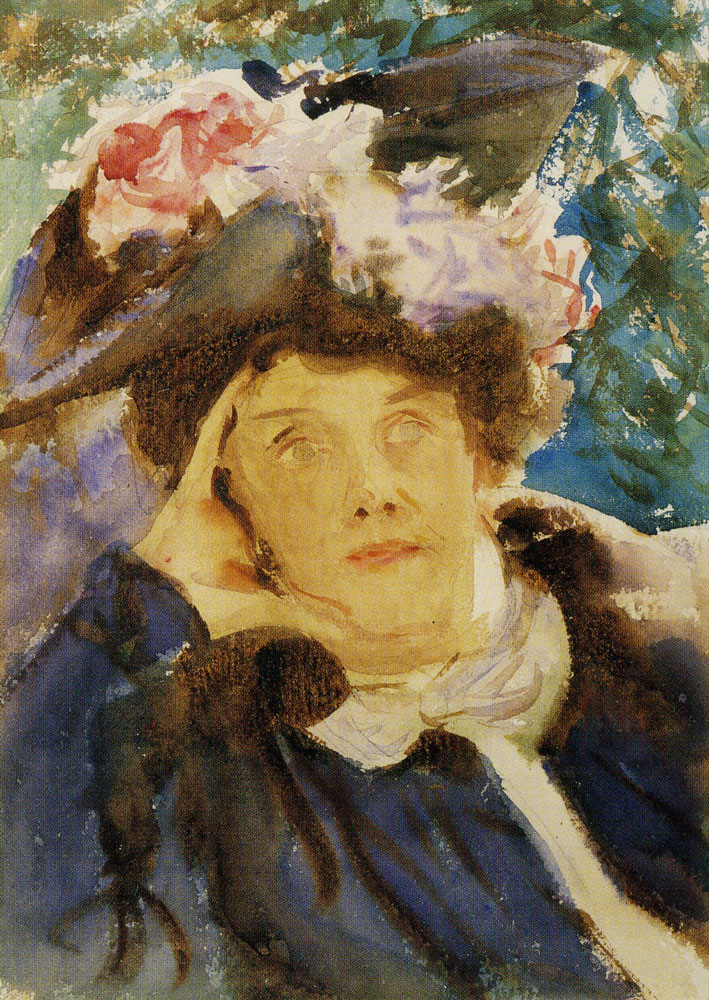
Mrs Peter Harrison (Alma Strettell), 1905 by Sargent

Alma Gertrude Vansittart Strettell was born 1853, in Genoa, Italy, the daughter of Laura Vansittart (née Neale) and the Reverend Alfred Baker Strettell, the British consular chaplain in Genoa, and subsequently the rector of St. Martin’s Church in Canterbury. Strettell was brought up in Italy, and only moved to Britain in 1873 after her older sister, Alice Comyns Carr married and moved there, later becoming a costume designer and a leader of the Artistic Dress movement there.

In 1890, Strettell married Lawrence Alexander "Peter" Harrison (1866–1937), an English painter, and continued to publish under her maiden name. They had three children.

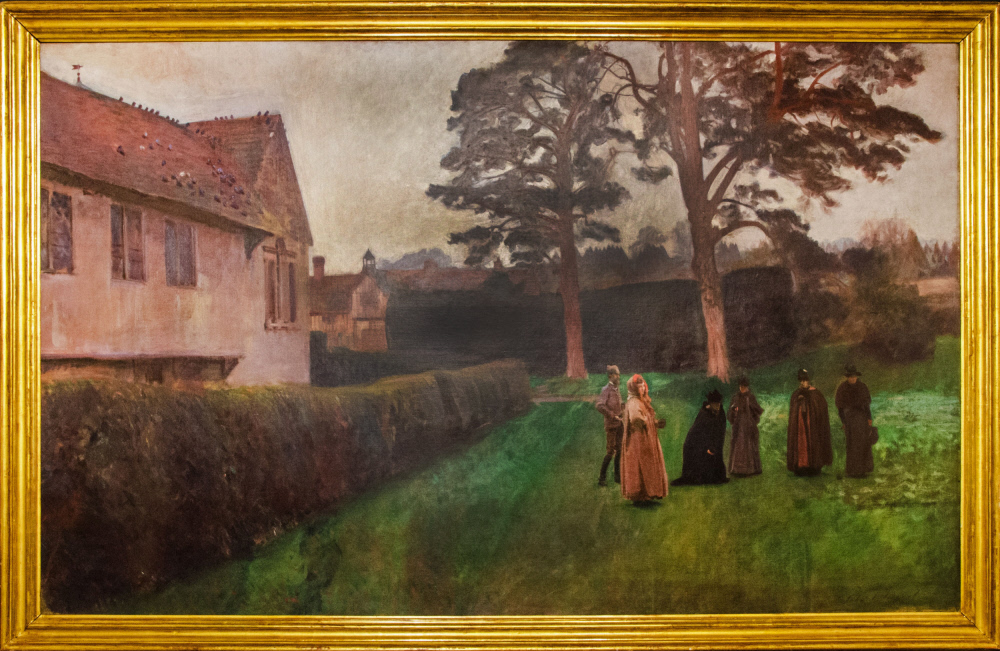
Sargent - A Game of Bowls, 1889, NT 826023

== Literary career ==
Strettell established a reputation as a translator with some forty translations that she contributed to the 1889 volume Selections from the Greek Anthology. She is one of only five translators named on the title page. Over the subsequent decades of her career, critics complimented her on her "genius for felicitous paraphrases" from foreign languages and on her ability to make her translations sound as if they were originally written in English.

Two years later, she collaborated with Elisabeth of Wied, Queen consort of Romania, who published under the pen name Carmen Sylva. Together they translated the Romanian-French writer Elena Văcărescu's Romanian folk songs into English under the title The Bard of the Dimbovitza. The book proved popular and went through multiple reprints over the next decade, with selections being set to music by such composers as Charles Griffes, Arnold Bax, and Arthur Foote. They later (1896) collaborated on a second volume of translations, this time of folk tales.

In 1894, Strettell published Lullabies of Many Lands, which included translations from German, Norwegian, and Romanian.

In 1897, she published a book of translations of Spanish and Italian folk songs. It was illustrated by Edwin Austin Abbey and John Singer Sargent. Sargent, a close friend, painted Strettell's portrait twice, once around 1889 and again in 1905, and also included her in several group studies. She is among a group of figures in his 1889 painting A Game of Bowls, Ightham Mote, Kent.

In 1899, Strettell published Poems of Émile Verhaeren, with an expanded version in 1915 that stood as the major English translation of Verhaeren's work for the remainder of the century. Another poet she translated was Frédéric Mistral; her versions were issued in tandem with the 1907 English translation of his memoirs edited by Constance Maud. Other poets she translated included Paul Verlaine and Charles Baudelaire.

Strettell also published some of her own poetry in The Yellow Book and The Fortnightly Review.

== Publications ==
Translations

- Spanish and Italian Folk-Songs (1887)
- Selections from the Greek Anthology (1889, edited by Rosamund Marriott Watson; some 40 translations)
- The Bard of the Dimbovitza (Vol 1 1891, Vol 2 1894), (translation with Carmen Sylva of Elena Văcărescu's Lieder aus dem Dimbovitzathal (Bonn, 1889), collection of Romanian folk-songs, etc)
- Lullabies of Many Lands (1894, 1896)
- Legends from River & Mountain (1896, with Carmen Sylva)
- Poems of Émile Verhaeren (1899)
- The Metamorphosis (1922). London
- Memoirs of Mistral (1907, edited by Constance Maud, with translations from the Provençal)
- The Wreckers (les naufrageurs) (1909, with Ethel Smyth)

Articles

- "A Little Western Town" (1881, Macmillan's Magazine)
- "An Indian Festival" (1882, Macmillan's Magazine)

== Extract ==
Beware of black old cats, with evil faces;
Yet more, of kittens white and soft be wary:
My sweetheart was just such a little fairy,
And yet she well-nigh scratched my heart to pieces.
—Alice Strettell, from her translation of Heinrich Heine's poem "Hüt Dich, mein Freund, vor grimmen Teufelsfratsen"
