= Vansittart (East Indiaman) =

Four ships named Vansittart, the first probably for Peter van Sittart (father of Henry Vansittart), served the British East India Company (EIC) as East Indiamen:

- Vansittart, of 480 tons (bm), was launched in 1718 and was lost in 1719 on the outward leg of her maiden voyage.
- Vansittart, of 676 tons (bm), was launched in 1763, made four voyages for the EIC, and was sold for breaking up in 1775.
- Vansittart, of 829 tons (bm), was launched in 1780 and made three full voyages for the EIC before she was lost in 1789 on her way to China on her fourth voyage. Nonsuch helped rescue her crew and much of her treasure.

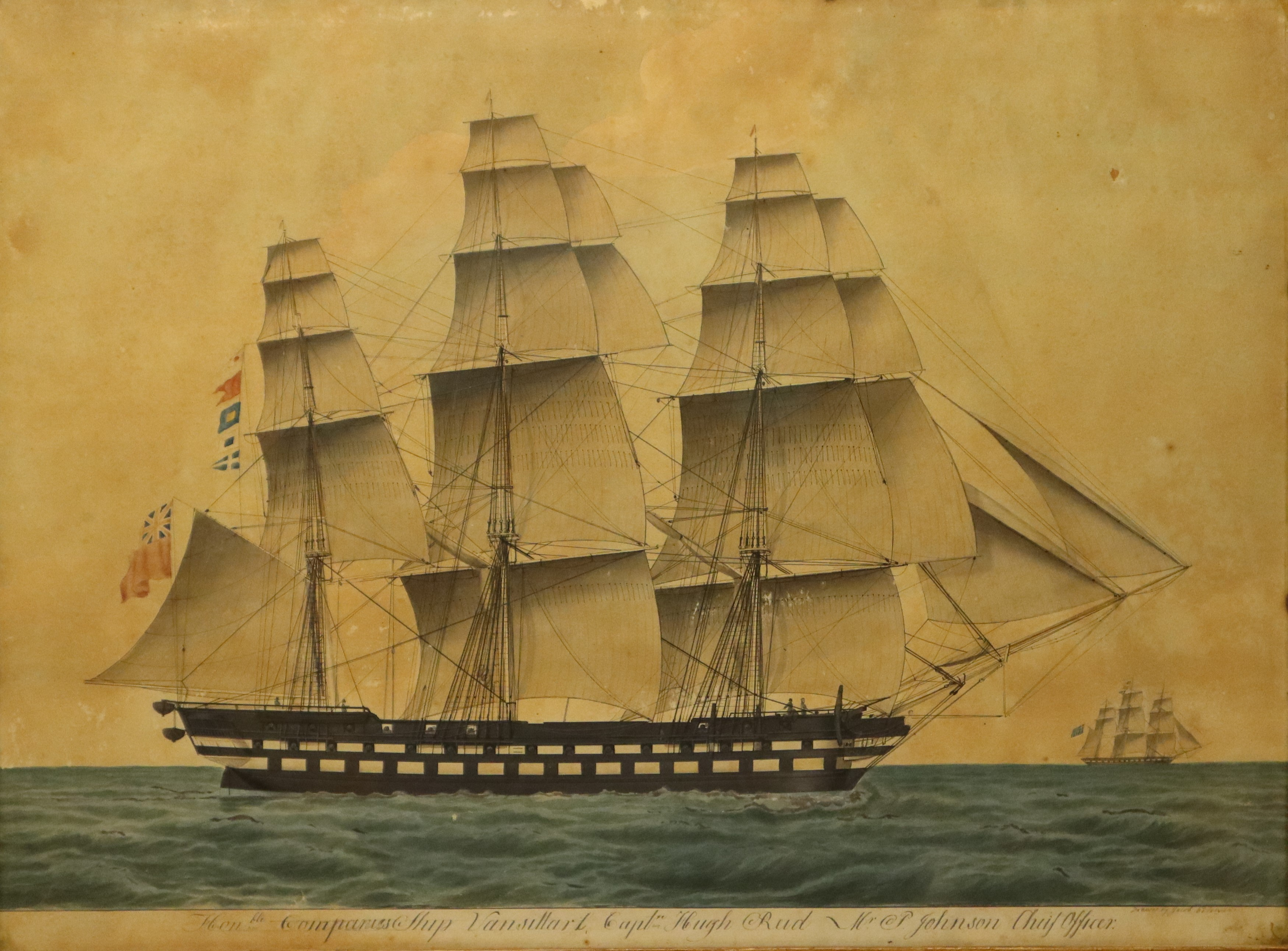
Water colour of the "Honourable Company's Ship Vansittart", painted by Danish artist Jacob Petersen between 1814 and 1817. In the collections of Bornholms Museum, Denmark. Reg. nr. 1288x00022.

- Vansittart, of 1312 tons (bm), was launched at Calcutta in 1813 for the India to China trade. However, she then became an East Indiaman for the British East India Company (EIC). She made 11 voyages for the EIC. Her owners then sold her and her new owners continued to sail her to China from London, the EIC's monopoly having ended. She carried opium from India to Canton. In 1839 she assumed a Danish name and registry as a short-lived subterfuge to evade Chinese government restrictions on the opium trade. By September 1840 she reverted to her original name and British registry. A fire of questionable origin destroyed her at Bombay in 1842.
