= Vansittart (1814 ship) =

History

United Kingdom
- Name: Vansittart
- Launched: 1807, New York
- Acquired: c.1814 by purchase of a prize
- Fate: Foundered 2 February 1855

General characteristics
- Tons burthen: 279, or 290, or 291, or 294 (bm)

Vansittart was launched at New York in 1807, under another name. She was captured c.1814 and new owners gave her the name Vansittart. She was initially a West Indiaman. Then between 1817 and 1837 she made seven voyages as a whaler in the British Southern Whale Fisheries. Thereafter she was a merchantman sailing out of Shields. She foundered on 2 February 1855.

== Career ==
Vansittart first appeared in Lloyd's Register in 1815 with W.Mills, master, changing to R.Creig, Hughes & Co., owners, and trade London–Antwerp, changing to London–West Indies. The Register of Shipping (RS) showed her with M Mills, master, changing to R. Craigie, Hughs & Co., owner, and trade London–Antwerp, changing to London–Antigua. It also showed her as an American prize.

=== Whaler ===
Lloyd's Register for 1818 showed Vansittart with J.Bennett, master, Benett & Co., owners, and trade London–South Seas. It also showed her as having been built in New York in 1807.

1st whaling voyage (1817–1819): Captain James Daniel Bennett sailed from London on 28 July 1817, bound for the Isle of Desolation. He returned on 28 September 1819 with 400 casks of oil and 750 seal skins.

2nd whaling voyage (1819–1823): Captain Thomas C. Hunt sailed from London on 17 December 1819, bound for the New South Wales fishery. He returned on 8 April 1823 with 470 casks of whale oil.

3rd whaling voyage (1823–1826): Captain Bacon sailed on 17 June 1823, bound for New Zealand and the waters off Japan. At some point William Beacon became master of Vansittart.

On 20 January 1825, the Bennett whaler Mary wrecked on Jarvis Island. Fortuitously Vansittart, Captain Beacon, and Francis, Captain Thomas Hunt, arrived in May. Each ship took part of Mary's crew. Vansittart arrived at Sydney in July with 16 crew members from Mary, including the second officer.

Vansittart returned to England on 30 August 1826 with 400 casks of whale oil.

4th whaling voyage (1826–1829): Captain David Barney sailed on 1 December 1826, bound for Peru. Vansittart returned on 16 July 1829.

5th whaling voyage (1829–?): Captain William Blakely was both Vansittart's master and owner on this voyage.

6th whaling voyage (1831–?): Thomas Gustard was Vansittart's master on this voyage. Blakely was still her owner, together with some partners.

7th whaling voyage (1834–37): Captain Thomas Hunt sailed in 1834. He returned on 4 April 1837 with 470 casks of whale oil.

=== Later career ===
LR for 1837 showed Vansittart with R.Murray, master, changing to I.B.Shipley, Hart, owner, and trade London–Petersburg. She had undergone a large repair in 1837. Hart moved Vansittart's homeport to South Shields.

Year	Master	Owner	Trade	Source & notes
1840	W.Down	Hart	Newcastle–London	LR; large repair 1837, and small repairs 1837 & 1838
1845	W.Down	Hart	Newcastle–London	LR; large repair 1837 & 1845
1850	W.Down	Hart	Newcastle–London	LR; large repair 1837 & 1845

On 19 February 1854 Vansittart ran aground on the Sunk Sand. She was on a voyage from South Shields to London. She was refloated and put in to Ramsgate.

LR for 1854 showed Vansittart with I.Wallis, master, R.Hart, owner, and trade Shields–Mediterranean.

== Fate ==
Vansittart foundered in the Atlantic Ocean off Cape Finisterre, Spain, on 2 February 1855. Adventure rescued her crew. Vansittart was on a voyage from South Shields, to Constantinople, Ottoman Empire.
