= Bermondsey (London County Council constituency) =

Former London County Council constituency

- Former constituency for the London County Council

Former constituency
- Created: 1889; 1949
- Abolished: 1919; 1965
- Member(s): 2 (1889 to 1919); 3 (1949 to 1965)
- Created from: Bermondsey West and Rotherhithe
- Replaced by: Bermondsey West and Rotherhithe

Bermondsey was a constituency used for elections to the London County Council between 1889 and 1919, and again between 1949 and the council's abolition, in 1965. The seat shared boundaries with the UK Parliament constituency of the same name.

== Councillors ==
Year	Name	Party	Name	Party
1889	George Cooper	Progressive	Joseph Thornton	Progressive
1899	George Cooper	Progressive	Arthur Acland Allen	Progressive
1906	Alfred Salter	Progressive	Arthur Acland Allen	Progressive
1910	William Henry Ecroyd	Progressive	Charles Russell	Progressive
1913	William Henry Ecroyd	Progressive	Montague Shearman, Jr	Progressive

Year	Name	Party	Name	Party	Name	Party
1949	James Allan Gillison	Labour	Reg Goodwin	Labour	Alfred John Kemp	Labour
1952	John R. Thomas	Labour	Reg Goodwin	Labour	Alfred John Kemp	Labour
1961	John R. Thomas	Labour	Albert Samuels	Labour	Alfred John Kemp	Labour

== Election results ==
=== 1889 to 1919 ===
1889 London County Council election: Bermondsey
Party	Candidate	Votes	%	±%
Progressive	George Cooper	2,602		
Progressive	Joseph Thornton	2,401		
Moderate	Hugh Colin Smith	1,319		
Moderate	Thomas Brooksbank	1,280		
Independent	William Shepherd	556		
Progressive win (new seat)				
Progressive win (new seat)				

1892 London County Council election: Bermondsey
Party	Candidate	Votes	%	±%
Progressive	George Cooper	3,181		
Progressive	Joseph Thornton	3,052		
Moderate	Horace Sedger	1,995		
Moderate	John Dumphreys	1,830		
Progressive hold		Swing		
Progressive hold		Swing		

1895 London County Council election: Bermondsey
Party	Candidate	Votes	%	±%
Progressive	George Cooper	2,703		
Progressive	Joseph Thornton	2,699		
Moderate	A. Beresford	1,682		
Moderate	V. J. Hussey Walsh	1,668		
Progressive hold		Swing		
Progressive hold		Swing		

1898 London County Council election: Bermondsey
Party	Candidate	Votes	%	±%
Progressive	George Cooper	2,977		
Progressive	Joseph Thornton	2,843		
Moderate	W. W. Tyler	2,028		
Moderate	Forbes St John Morrow	1,993		
Progressive hold		Swing		
Progressive hold		Swing		

1901 London County Council election: Bermondsey
Party	Candidate	Votes	%	±%
Progressive	George Cooper	3,147	30.4	+0.2
Progressive	Arthur Acland Allen	3,096	29.9	+1.0
Conservative	Thomas Cox	2,094	20.2	−0.4
Conservative	A. Layman	2,026	19.5	−0.8
Progressive hold		Swing		
Progressive hold		Swing	+0.6	

1904 London County Council election: Bermondsey
Party	Candidate	Votes	%	±%
Progressive	George Cooper	3,221		
Progressive	Arthur Acland Allen	3,215		
Conservative	T. H. Flood	2,153		
Conservative	F. R. Anderton	2,085		
Progressive hold		Swing		
Progressive hold		Swing		

1907 London County Council election: Bermondsey
Party	Candidate	Votes	%	±%
Progressive	Alfred Salter	4,197		
Progressive	Arthur Acland Allen	4,195		
Municipal Reform	J. F. Vesey FitzGerald	3,474		
Municipal Reform	J. K. Foster	3,389		
Progressive hold		Swing		
Progressive hold		Swing		

1910 London County Council election: Bermondsey
Party	Candidate	Votes	%	±%
Progressive	Charles Russell	3,288	24.5	
Progressive	William Henry Ecroyd	3,276	24.4	
Municipal Reform	Walter Somerville	2,509	18.7	
Municipal Reform	Joseph Ricardo	2,470	18.4	
Labour	Alfred Salter	1,876	14.0	
Majority				
Progressive hold		Swing		
Progressive hold		Swing		

1913 London County Council election: Bermondsey
Party	Candidate	Votes	%	±%
Progressive	William Henry Ecroyd	2,951		
Progressive	Montague Shearman	2,820		
Municipal Reform	E. Stickland	2,462		
Municipal Reform	John Swiney	2,409		
Labour	Alfred Salter	1,632		
Labour	Charles Ammon	1,374		
Majority				
Progressive hold		Swing		
Progressive hold		Swing		

=== 1949 to 1965 ===
1949 London County Council election: Bermondsey
Party	Candidate	Votes	%	±%
Labour	James Allan Gillison	12,551		
Labour	Reg Goodwin	12,149		
Labour	Alfred John Kemp	12,097		
Conservative	W. B. J. Pemberton	4,045		
Conservative	A. P. Davis	3,842		
Conservative	C. Martin	3,824		
Labour win (new seat)				
Labour win (new seat)				
Labour win (new seat)				

1952 London County Council election: Bermondsey
Party	Candidate	Votes	%	±%
Labour	Alfred John Kemp	13,149		
Labour	Reg Goodwin	12,985		
Labour	John R. Thomas	12,563		
Conservative	W. B. J. Pemberton	2,035		
Conservative	C. F. Bassett	1,980		
Conservative	D. Willmott	1,811		
Labour hold		Swing		
Labour hold		Swing		
Labour hold		Swing		

1955 London County Council election: Bermondsey
Party	Candidate	Votes	%	±%
Labour	Alfred John Kemp	7,526		
Labour	Reg Goodwin	7,098		
Labour	John R. Thomas	7,093		
Conservative	J. Murray	1,644		
Conservative	H. Oliver	1,319		
Conservative	E. E. Simpkins	1,303		
Labour hold		Swing		
Labour hold		Swing		
Labour hold		Swing		

1958 London County Council election: Bermondsey
Party	Candidate	Votes	%	±%
Labour	Alfred John Kemp	8,042		
Labour	Reg Goodwin	7,725		
Labour	John R. Thomas	7,650		
Conservative	H. M. L. Morton	774		
Conservative	H. W. Aplin	673		
Conservative	R. G. Field	600		
Ind. Labour Party	E. R. Gomme	362		
Ind. Labour Party	G. F. Bond	300		
Ind. Labour Party	A. Collyer	284		
Labour hold		Swing		
Labour hold		Swing		
Labour hold		Swing		

1961 London County Council election: Bermondsey
Party	Candidate	Votes	%	±%
Labour	Alfred John Kemp	9,404		
Labour	John R. Thomas	9,134		
Labour	Albert Samuels	8,814		
Conservative	N. G. Wallace	1,506		
Conservative	J. MacN. Porter	1,463		
Conservative	G. E. Collyer	1,275		
Ind. Labour Party	A. Collyer	724		
Ind. Labour Party	E. R. Gomme	541		
Ind. Labour Party	Frank Ridley	368		
Labour hold		Swing		
Labour hold		Swing		
Labour hold		Swing		
