= Roderick Kedward =

Roderick Kedward may refer to:

- Rod Kedward (1937–2023), British historian
- Roderick Kedward (politician) (1881–1937), British politician
