= Spencer Leigh Hughes =

British politician

Spencer Leigh Hughes

Spencer Leigh Hughes (21 April 1858 – 22 February 1920) was a British engineer, journalist, and Liberal politician.

== Family and education ==
Spencer Leigh Hughes was born at Trowbridge in Wiltshire, the son of the Reverend James Hughes, a Wesleyan minister. He was educated at Woodhouse Grove School near Apperley Bridge in the West Riding of Yorkshire. In 1881 he married Ellen Wayland, the daughter of James Groves from Newport, Isle of Wight. They had one daughter. Hughes was widowed in 1916 and did not remarry.

== Career ==
Hughes began working life as an engineer in the firm of Ransomes, Sims & Jeffries of Ipswich but went on to make his reputation as a journalist with the publication The Morning Leader, for which he wrote for many years a column under the title of 'Sub Rosa'. His articles dealt in a light and witty fashion with current topics, political and other, and he continued writing it for some time after the Morning Leader merged with The Daily News in 1912. Hughes came to be known professionally and in political circles as 'S.L.H' and was regarded a successful Press Gallery journalist. One of the highlights of Hughes press career was being appointed a special correspondent by the Morning Leader for the visit of Kaiser Wilhelm and the Empress Augusta to Palestine in 1898. Hughes also contributed material to other newspapers, most notably The Star. Hughes was also a strong supporter of the Institute of Journalists, the professional and representative body for journalists, being sometime vice-chairman of the organisation.

== Politics ==
=== Jarrow ===
SLH's Press Gallery reportage had heightened his interest in politics and he aspired to a Parliamentary career. His nonconformist religion and association with the radical publication the Morning Leader, described as 'the only Radical morning paper in London in 1901' had reinforced his already strong Liberal leanings. However he did not have an easy journey into Parliament. His first opportunity came at Jarrow in 1907. The sitting Liberal MP, the 84-year-old Sir Charles Palmer, announced that he did not intend to stand for Parliament at the next election and the local Liberals selected Hughes as his replacement. Hughes' opportunity to get into Parliament came quickly as Sir Charles died on 4 June 1907 thus causing a by-election at which Hughes was adopted as Liberal candidate. At the 1906 general election Palmer had had a straight fight with Labour but the by-election on 4 July 1907 was a four-way contest with Hughes facing, Labour, Conservative and Irish Parliamentary Party opponents. With the non-Labour vote split badly, the Labour candidate Pete Curran topped the poll, with the Tory, Patrick Rose-Innes second, Hughes third and Alderman John O'Hanlon, the Irish Nationalist, last.

=== Bermondsey ===
In 1909, following the death of George Cooper, the Liberal MP for Bermondsey, Hughes was adopted unanimously as the candidate for the ensuing by-election. Bermondsey was an important contest. It was the only by-election to take place between the speech made by Chancellor of the Exchequer, David Lloyd George, at Limehouse on 30 July 1909 and the January 1910 general election and was therefore seen as a commentary on the economic policies of the government against the background of the People's Budget. The Conservatives campaigned against the radicalism of the Liberals and their idea of massive state intervention in welfare. Hughes and the local Liberals embraced this New Liberal approach but the left-wing vote was split between Hughes and the Labour candidate Dr Alfred Salter. Salter was Progressive Party member of the London County Council for Bermondsey, having replaced George Cooper in representing the seat, and was therefore regarded as a Liberal. The Bermondsey Liberals considered adopting Salter as their candidate for the by-election but thought him too advanced politically and by 1909 Salter had become increasingly associated with the Independent Labour Party. Salter was to become the Labour candidate in the election, presenting himself as the true heir to George Cooper's legacy, he strongly supported the anti-poverty message of Lloyd George's budget and split the progressive vote. Hughes also struggled as a candidate not previously associated with Bermondsey whereas Salter could properly portray himself as Cooper's successor. All this allowed the Tory candidate John Dumphreys to top the poll and win by a majority of 987 votes.

=== Stockport ===
Such was Hughes' reputation within the Liberal Party that these two defeats did not discourage Liberal Associations from considering him for further Parliamentary contests. The local party in Sudbury in Suffolk were reported to be about to ask him to contest their seat when their MP, William Heaton-Armstrong, indicated he would soon be retiring. Instead however Hughes was invited to become the Liberal candidate for a safer (but not rock solid) prospect, Stockport in north-east Cheshire, replacing the more traditionally inclined Liberal MP James Duckworth. At the January 1910 general election he was finally successful in becoming an MP, elected as one of Stockport's two Liberal MPs. He held the seat for the rest of his life, being returned unopposed in 1918 as a Coalition Liberal.

== Legacy ==
One historian has concluded that Hughes remained "an obscure backbencher" and politically his impact may have been small but his ability to entertain and divert the House of Commons was second to none and on more than one occasion his humour in debate transformed the atmosphere of the chamber from cold, hostile and partisan, or just plain bored, to one of comradeship and laughter. David Lloyd George described one speech as "extraordinarily brilliant" and his obituary in The Times concluded he was liked by everybody and the Press Gallery always had a warm corner in its heart for him. It is clear that Hughes' great strength was his ability with words, both on paper and as a public speaker. He was said to be the cleverest after-dinner speaker of his time and was constantly in demand at dinners and other occasions.

== Publications ==
Hughes’ abilities with words is reflected in his many publications and in the topics he chose to write about.

- From Village Green to Downing Street, The Life of the Rt. Hon. D Lloyd George; (with John Hugh Edwards), George Newnes, 1908
- Press, Platform and Parliament, Nisbet & Co, 1918
- The English Character, T. N. Foulis, 1912
- The Art of Public Speaking, Daily News and Record, 1913
- Things that don’t count, C. Palmer and Hayward, 1916

== Death ==
Hughes died suddenly on 22 February 1920 at the age of 61 from heart failure. Apparently while speaking at an engagement in Lancashire early in 1920, he broke a blood vessel setting up an aneurysm which terminated fatally. It was reported that Hughes had been unwell for some time and had not attended Parliament in the current session. His funeral took place on 27 February 1920 at Ipswich.

Parliament of the United Kingdom
Preceded by James Duckworth	Member of Parliament for Stockport; January 1910 – 1920	Succeeded by Henry Fildes
