= Bermondsey by-election =

Bermondsey by-election may refer to one of two parliamentary by-elections for the British House of Commons constituency of Bermondsey, in South London:

- 1909 Bermondsey by-election, following the death of George Cooper
- 1983 Bermondsey by-election, following the resignation of Bob Mellish. Won by the Liberal Party with a huge swing.

== See also ==
- Bermondsey (UK Parliament constituency)
