= Marian Barry =

Irish trade unionist

- Born: 1 October 1871; Skibbereen, County Cork
- Died: 8 September 1921 (aged 49); Brighton
- Occupation: Trade Unionist.

Marian Barry (1 October 1871 – 8 September 1921) was an Irish trade unionist.

Barry was born at Skibbereen, County Cork, a daughter of John and Mary (née Ronan) Barry. She followed her parents into tailoring, and moved to London when she was around twenty years old. There, she joined a union for female tailors, which soon affiliated to the Women's Trade Union League. Barry soon became a spokesperson for the league, and was elected as its assistant secretary in 1896.

She often attended the London Trades Council, which supported her successful nomination to London County Council's technical education board in 1897.

Through her trade union work, Barry this met Pete Curran, the two marrying in 1897 or 1898, and she thereafter was known as "Mrs Pete Curran". The couple had four children, and Marian withdrew from political activity until 1906 in order to bring them up.

In 1906, Barry was appointed as an organiser for the Women's Trade Union League. She founded a branch in Jarrow, where her husband won a by-election, in 1907, a campaign in which Marian was prominent. She campaigned locally for reforms including free school meals, and was elected to the League's executive in 1908. She is believed to have also campaigned for women's suffrage.

Pete Curran lost his seat in 1910 and died shortly afterwards. Marian relocated to Hackney, where she was active on the local employment exchange. She died at Brighton in 1921.
