= Alfred Lafone =

British politician

Lafone in 1895.

Alfred Lafone (13 February 1821 – 26 April 1911) of Hanworth Park, Feltham, Middlesex, was a British leather merchant and Conservative Party politician in London. He was the Member of Parliament (MP) for Bermondsey from 1886 to 1892, and from 1895 to 1900.

== Origins ==
Lafone was born in the West Derby area of Liverpool, the fourth son of Samuel Lafone. His half-brother was Samuel Fisher Lafone (1805–1871), a powerful and influential businessman based in Montevideo, dealing in cattle and hides, the wealthiest British resident in South America who in 1843 made a spectacular land purchase in Uruguay, and had purchased a large estate on East Falkland.

== Career ==
He was educated privately, and moved to Bermondsey in London where he joined the leather and hide factors business of Boutcher, Mortimore and Company.

He was elected in 1870 as a member of the London School Board, and was re-elected in 1873. In 1873 he purchased the large mansion house and estate of Hanworth Park, near London. At the 1885 general election he unsuccessfully contested the new Bermondsey division of Southwark, losing by only 83 votes (1.2% of the total) to the sitting Liberal MP Thorold Rogers. He had been selected by the local Conservative Association in preference to John Dumphreys, who had been put forward as a Conservative working man's candidate.

However, he defeated Rogers at the 1886 election, taking the seat with a swing of 3.4%. In 1888, he chaired a committee set up to raise funds for the establishment of a series of South London Polytechnics. The first of the three institutes was Goldsmiths College in New Cross, which opened in 1891, followed in 1892 by the Borough Road Polytechnic, of which Lafone became a governor.

By 1892 he had become a Justice of the Peace (JP) for Middlesex, but at the 1892 general election he lost his seat in Parliament to the Liberal Party candidate Reuben Barrow, on a swing of 7.9%.

He stood again in 1895, with the active support of the local Liberal Unionist Party. On election day, his campaign was assisted by many loans of carriages, including from the Duke of Norfolk, the Duke of Richmond, the Earl of Yarborough, Lord Iveagh, and Baroness Burdett-Coutts. The sitting Liberal MP, Reuben Barrow, was supported by processions of workingmen, but Lafone regained the seat with a majority of 360 votes (4.4% of the total).

Lafone retired from Parliament at the 1900 general election, on account of his "advanced age"; he was by then 79 years old.

== Marriage and progeny ==
In 1852 Lafone married Jane Boutcher, daughter of William Boutcher of Grateley in Hampshire. She died on 9 April 1885. A son, Captain William Bauthcher Lafone, aged 40, was killed in action at Ladysmith in January 1900. "In Captain Lafone the regiment has lost one of the kindest-hearted and best officers that ever led a company."

== Death ==
He died aged 90 on 26 April 1911, at his mansion house Hanworth Park having been ill for about four months.

Parliament of the United Kingdom
Preceded by Thorold Rogers	Member of Parliament for Bermondsey; 1886 – 1892	Succeeded by Reuben Barrow
Preceded by Reuben Barrow	Member of Parliament for Bermondsey; 1895 – 1900	Succeeded by Henry Cust
