= Alison Neilans =

English suffragette (1884–1942)

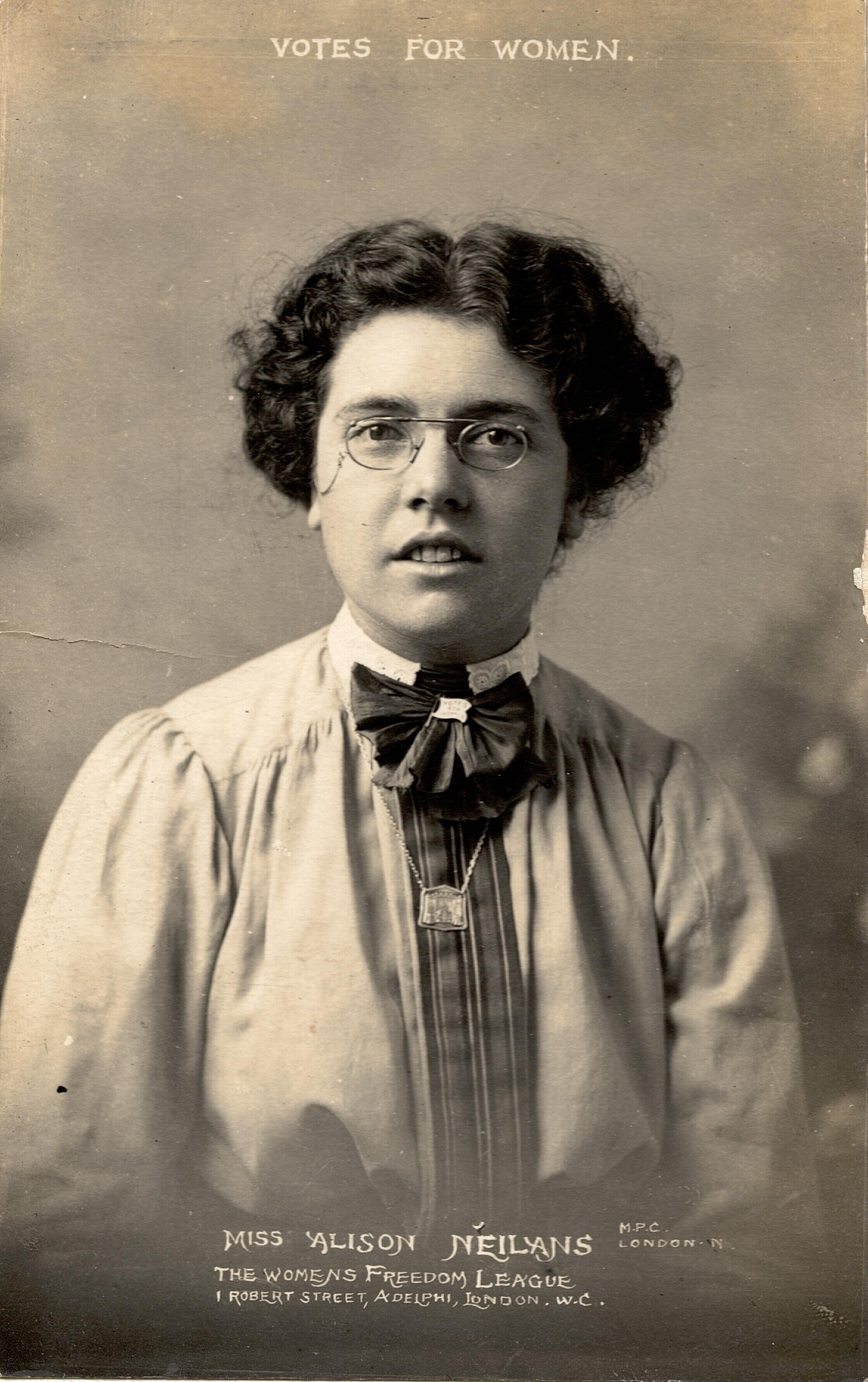
Alison Neilans was the general secretary for the Association for Moral and Social Hygiene in the 1920s.

Alison Roberta Noble Neilans (19 June 1884 – 17 July 1942) was an English suffragette. Neilans was a member of the executive committee of the Women's Freedom League, a member of the Church League for Women's Suffrage and the East London Federation of Suffragettes, where she worked with Sylvia Pankhurst. She was also a member of the board of the International Woman Suffrage Alliance.

== Life ==
Neilans was born at East Dulwich, Surrey on 19 June 1884. She had a good life until her father died when she was age 12, and she was obliged to work as a bookkeeper. She became the financial secretary of the Women's Freedom League in 1908.

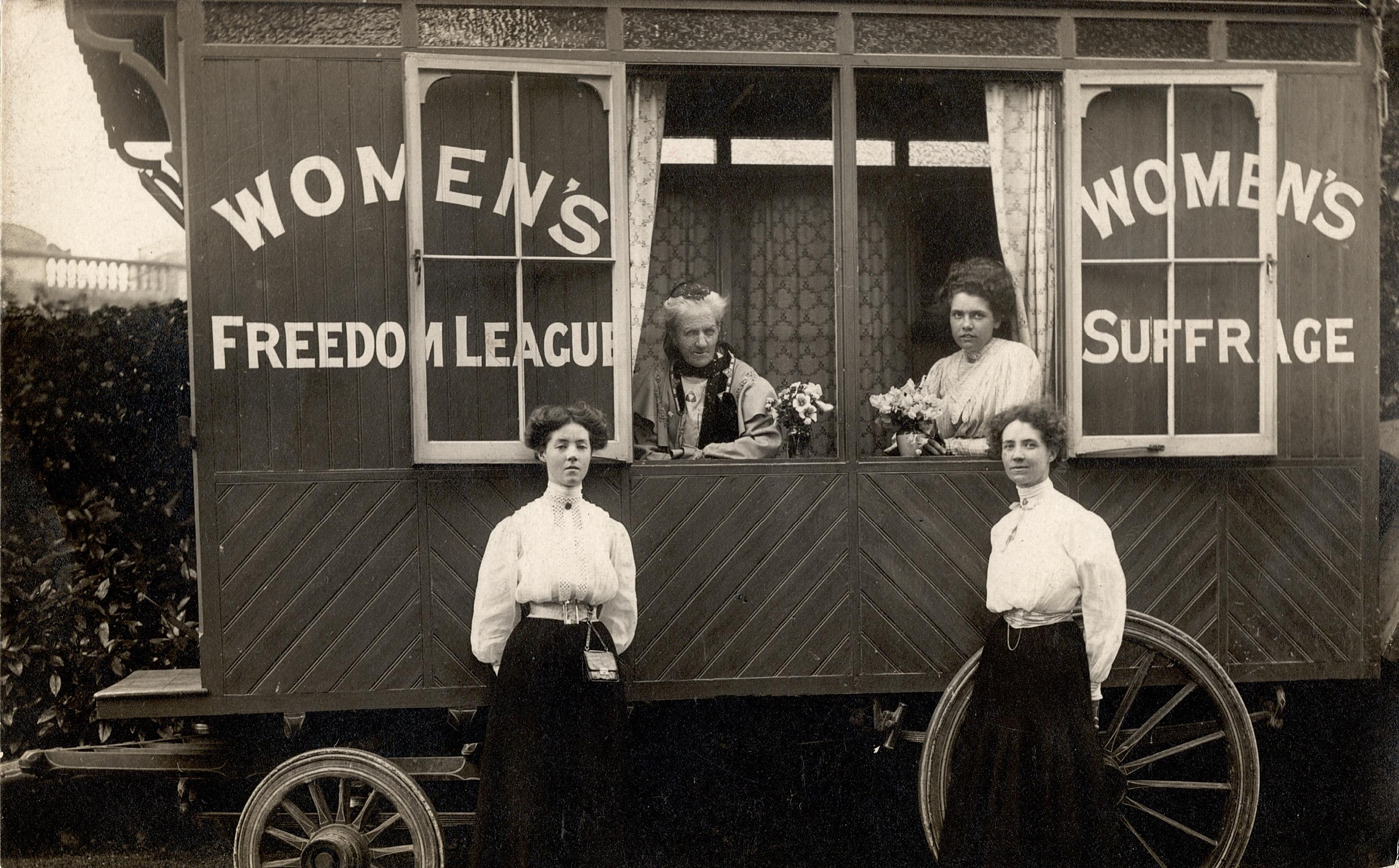
Charlotte Despard and Neilans at the Women's Freedom League caravan's window in 1908

Neilans was imprisoned three times for her activities; twice, for one month each occurrence, in 1908 and once, for three months, in 1909. Her third prison sentence was for pouring liquid into ballot boxes at a local by-election. She and Alice Chapin splashed chemicals over the ballot papers in the 1909 Bermondsey by-election. The protest was intended to highlight that the Prime Minister had refused to see a deputation of suffrage campaigners who had been sitting outside the House of Commons since July. Chapin was successful in damaging many ballot papers, and Neilans damaged a few. Most of the ballot papers were still readable and John Dumphreys was elected. However, presiding officer George Thorley had chemicals splashed in his eye. At their trials the doctors said that Thorley may have a haze over his eyes for life but Thorley stated that he did not believe that injury had been intended. Some suffragettes believed that Thorley had exaggerated his injury and that the damage was due to someone applying ammonia after the incident in an attempt at treatment.

Chapin and Neilans were tried at the Old Bailey, and Neilans later published an account of their defence. Chapin was given a larger sentence than Neilans, but she was released two days after her under the "King's Pardon".

In August 1913, Neilans was the speaker for the daily meetings of the Women's Freedom League 'Clyde Coast Campaign', which included Rothesay, Largs and Dunoon.
