= 1933 Ashford by-election =

UK parliamentary by-election

- 17 March 1933

The Ashford seat in the House of Commons.
Candidate	Patrick Spens, 1st Baron Spens	Richard Matthews
Party	Conservative	Liberal
Popular vote	21,323	8,338
Percentage	59.2%	23.2%

The 1933 Ashford by-election was a parliamentary by-election for the British House of Commons constituency of Ashford on 17 March 1933.

== Vacancy ==
The by-election was caused by the sitting Conservative MP, Michael Knatchbull's succession to the peerage on 15 February 1933. He had been MP here since gaining the seat in 1931.

== Election history ==
Ashford had been gained by the Conservatives from the Liberals at the last election. The Liberals had gained the seat in 1929, the only occasion since the war that the Conservatives did not win. The result at the last General election was as follows;

General election 27 October 1931: Electorate 46,882
Party	Candidate	Votes	%	±%
Conservative	Michael Knatchbull	20,891	58.7	+16.1
Liberal National	Roderick Kedward	14,681	41.3	−4.7
Majority		6,210	17.4	
Turnout		35,572	75.9	+0.6
Conservative gain from Liberal		Swing		

== Candidates ==
The local Conservatives selected 48-year-old Patrick Spens as candidate to defend the seat. He served in the First World War as an adjutant in the 5th battalion of the Queen's Royal Regiment. After the war Spens started practising as a lawyer and became a King's Counsel (KC) in 1925. He unsuccessfully contested St Pancras South West in the 1929 general election.

The Liberals selected 52-year-old Wesleyan minister and former MP for the seat, Rev. Roderick Kedward as candidate. During the First World War, Kedward served in Egypt and France. He was invalided out of the army in October 1916 with 'trench fever' but served as president of ex-servicemen's associations after the war. He unsuccessfully contested the Kingston upon Hull Central constituency at the 1918 general election. He stood in Bermondsey West at the 1922 general election. At the next election in 1923, he was elected as the Bermondsey West Member of Parliament but was defeated at the 1924 general election. Transferring his political allegiance to his original home area, Kedward stood at the 1929 general election for Ashford in Kent. He won a remarkable victory with a swing of over 20% from the Tories to the Liberals. During this time, Kedward was strongly associated with the National Tithe-payers Association, a group which campaigned against the collection of tithes by the Church of England mainly for the upkeep of the clergy and which was unevenly levied across the country, hitting some areas harder than others. In 1931, having sided with the Simonite faction in the Liberal party, Kedward fought Ashford as a Liberal National but was defeated as the local Conservatives refused to endorse his candidacy, seeing him as too radical and disliking his overt non-conformism (anti-tithe stance).

The local Labour party selected W J Beck as candidate. Labour had not contested the seat in 1931 and in 1929 their candidate had finished a poor third.

== Main Issues and Campaign ==
Polling Day was set for 17 March 1933.

At this point, the leading Liberal ministers had all resigned from government office, however, they remained supporters of the National Government and sat on the government benches. Many in the Liberal party outside parliament felt that the Liberals should now sit on the opposition benches. Only four Liberals, including David Lloyd George had been elected in 1931 and gone into opposition. In February 1932, a fifth Liberal MP, Harry Nathan had also moved into opposition. Roderic Kedward, the Liberal candidate, declared that he was contesting the election as a candidate opposed to the National government and would sit on the opposition Liberal benches if he were elected. This allowed Kedward the freedom to criticise the government on a wide range of issues during the campaign. However, his stance highlighted the awkward position of the Liberals in parliament.

== Result ==
Despite a small swing against the National Government, the Conservative managed to hold on to the seat because the Labour intervention split the anti-Tory vote.

Ashford by-election, 1933: Electorate 47,434
Party	Candidate	Votes	%	±%
Conservative	Patrick Spens	16,051	47.7	−11.0
Liberal	Roderick Kedward	11,423	33.9	−7.6
Labour	W J Beck	6,178	18.4	+18.4
Majority		4,628	13.8	−3.7
Turnout		33,652	70.9	−5.0
Conservative hold		Swing	-1.7	

== Aftermath ==
The Liberal Party formally moved into opposition to the National government in November 1933. Spens was re-elected in 1935. In 1937 Kedward died from the sudden onset of a duodenal ulcer. The result at the following General election;

General election 14 November 1935: Ashford Electorate 48,914
Party	Candidate	Votes	%	±%
Conservative	Patrick Spens	21,323	59.2	+0.5
Liberal	Richard Matthews	8,338	23.2	N/A
Labour	W J Beck	6,333	17.6	N/A
Majority		12,985	36.0	+18.6
Turnout		35,994	73.6	−2.3
Conservative hold		Swing		

== See also ==
- List of United Kingdom by-elections
- United Kingdom by-election records
