= Rotherhithe (London County Council constituency) =

London County Council constituency

- Former constituency for the London County Council

Former constituency
- Created: 1889
- Abolished: 1949
- Member(s): 2
- Replaced by: Bermondsey

Rotherhithe was a constituency used for elections to the London County Council between 1889 and 1949. The seat shared boundaries with the UK Parliament constituency of the same name.

== Councillors ==
Year	Name	Party	Name	Party
1889	Francis Culling Carr-Gomm	Progressive	Lawrence Stevens	Progressive
1892	James Thomas Macnamara	Progressive	Lawrence Stevens	Progressive
1894	Howell Jones Williams	Progressive	Lawrence Stevens	Progressive
1894	Howell Jones Williams	Progressive	William Henry Christopher Payne	Moderate
1895	Arthur Henry Aylmer Morton	Moderate	William Henry Christopher Payne	Moderate
1898	Ambrose Pomeroy	Progressive	Harold Glanville	Progressive
1910	John Scott Lidgett	Progressive	Robert Leishman Stuart	Progressive
1922	Alan Randle	Labour	William John Webb	Labour
1928	Isaac Hayward	Labour	Sidney Stranks	Labour
1934	Isaac Hayward	Labour	James Allan Gillison	Labour
1937	Albert Charles Starr	Labour	James Allan Gillison	Labour

== Election results ==
1889 London County Council election: Rotherhithe
Party	Candidate	Votes	%	±%
Progressive	Francis Culling Carr-Gomm	1,968		
Progressive	Lawrence Stevens	1,652		
Moderate	John Bulmer	1,607		
Moderate	William Watson Tyler	741		
Progressive win (new seat)				
Progressive win (new seat)				

1892 London County Council election: Rotherhithe
Party	Candidate	Votes	%	±%
Progressive	Lawrence Stevens	2,853		
Progressive	James Thomas Macnamara	2,720		
Moderate	John Bulmer	2,107		
Moderate	C. C. Gridley	1,913		
Progressive hold		Swing		
Progressive hold		Swing		

1895 London County Council election: Rotherhithe
Party	Candidate	Votes	%	±%
Moderate	William Henry Christopher Payne	2,630		
Moderate	Arthur Henry Aylmer Morton	2,474		
Progressive	Howell Jones Williams	2,417		
Progressive	Harry Gosling	2,304		
Moderate gain from Progressive		Swing		
Moderate hold		Swing		

1898 London County Council election: Rotherhithe
Party	Candidate	Votes	%	±%
Progressive	Ambrose Pomeroy	2,778		
Progressive	Harold Glanville	2,650		
Moderate	William Henry Christopher Payne	2,427		
Moderate	A. Radford	2,344		
Progressive gain from Moderate		Swing		
Progressive gain from Moderate		Swing		

1901 London County Council election: Rotherhithe
Party	Candidate	Votes	%	±%
Progressive	Harold Glanville	2,934	28.2	+2.2
Progressive	Ambrose Pomeroy	2,927	28.1	+0.9
Conservative	James Augustus Grant	2,302	22.1	−1.7
Conservative	Arthur Pennell	2,244	21.6	−1.4
Progressive hold		Swing		
Progressive hold		Swing	+1.5	

1904 London County Council election: Rotherhithe
Party	Candidate	Votes	%	±%
Progressive	Ambrose Pomeroy	3,103		
Progressive	Harold Glanville	3,029		
Conservative	J. W. Oake	1,530		
Conservative	W. W. Tyler	1,448		
Independent	W. F. Brown	1,160		
Majority				
Progressive hold		Swing		

1907 London County Council election: Rotherhithe
Party	Candidate	Votes	%	±%
Progressive	Ambrose Pomeroy	3,693		
Progressive	Harold Glanville	3,663		
Municipal Reform	F. Fremantle	3,365		
Municipal Reform	F. E. Eddie	3,259		
Majority				
Progressive hold		Swing		

1910 London County Council election: Rotherhithe
Party	Candidate	Votes	%	±%
Progressive	John Scott Lidgett	3,716		
Progressive	Robert Leishman Stuart	3,706		
Municipal Reform	H. G. L. Davidson	2,060		
Municipal Reform	Gilbert Hurst	2,058		
Majority				
Progressive hold		Swing		

1913 London County Council election: Rotherhithe
Party	Candidate	Votes	%	±%
Progressive	Robert Leishman Stuart	3,186		
Progressive	John Scott Lidgett	3,159		
Municipal Reform	W. G. Marriott	2,662		
Municipal Reform	D. Radcliffe	2,457		
Majority				
Progressive hold		Swing		
Progressive hold		Swing		

1919 London County Council election: Rotherhithe
Party	Candidate	Votes	%	±%
Progressive	John Scott Lidgett	2,327	36.3	
Progressive	Robert Leishman Stuart	2,252	35.2	
Labour	Ada Salter	988	15.4	
Labour	John Thomas Westcott	839	13.1	
Majority		1,264	19.7	
Progressive hold		Swing		
Progressive hold		Swing		

1922 London County Council election: Rotherhithe
Party	Candidate	Votes	%	±%
Labour	Alan Randle	5,457		
Labour	William John Webb	5,296		
Progressive	John Scott Lidgett	3,807		
Progressive	Arthur Acland Allen	3,604		
Majority				
Labour gain from Progressive		Swing		
Labour gain from Progressive		Swing		

1925 London County Council election: Rotherhithe
Party	Candidate	Votes	%	±%
Labour	Alan Randle	5,604		
Labour	William John Webb	5,355		
Municipal Reform	J. J. Stewart	2,305		
Municipal Reform	F. W. Wallace	2,232		
Majority				
Labour hold		Swing		
Labour hold		Swing		

1928 London County Council election: Rotherhithe
Party	Candidate	Votes	%	±%
Labour	Isaac Hayward	6,006		
Labour	Sidney Stranks	5,946		
Municipal Reform	W. T. Donovan	2,721		
Municipal Reform	F. H. East	2,686		
Majority				
Labour hold		Swing		
Labour hold		Swing		

1931 London County Council election: Rotherhithe
Party	Candidate	Votes	%	±%
Labour	Isaac Hayward	4,338		
Labour	Sidney Stranks	4,291		
Municipal Reform	A. H. Gorman	2,053		
Municipal Reform	A. B. Bartley	2,047		
Majority				
Labour hold		Swing		
Labour hold		Swing		

1934 London County Council election: Rotherhithe
Party	Candidate	Votes	%	±%
Labour	James Allan Gillison	8,561		
Labour	Isaac Hayward	8,436		
Municipal Reform	A. H. Gorman	2,640		
Municipal Reform	T. W. E. Burgess	2,618		
Majority				
Labour hold		Swing		
Labour hold		Swing		

1937 London County Council election: Rotherhithe
Party	Candidate	Votes	%	±%
Labour	James Allan Gillison	9,065		
Labour	Albert Charles Starr	8,690		
Municipal Reform	Norah Runge	4,187		
Municipal Reform	J. A. Davis	3,830		
Majority				
Labour hold		Swing		
Labour hold		Swing		

1946 London County Council election: Rotherhithe
Party	Candidate	Votes	%	±%
Labour	James Allan Gillison	4,097		
Labour	Albert Charles Starr	4,094		
Conservative	C. Martin	645		
Conservative	W. Say	611		
Majority				
Labour hold		Swing		
Labour hold		Swing		
