= Queen's Road Cemetery =

Cemetery in Croydon, London, England

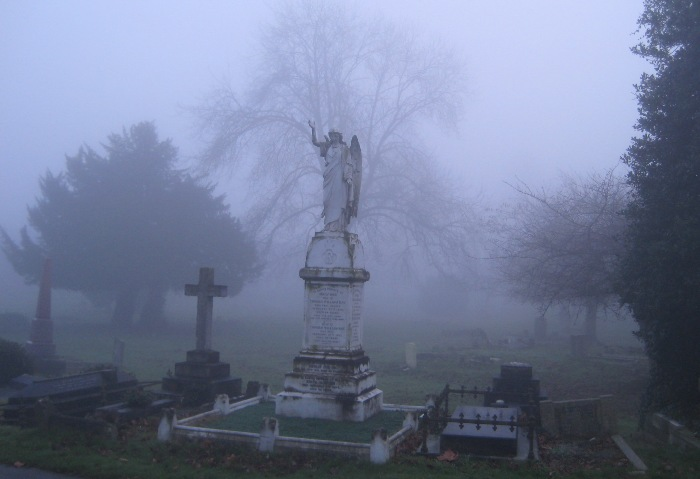
- Interactive map of Queen's Road Cemetery

Details
- Established: 1861
- Location: Croydon, London
- Country: England
- Coordinates: 51.3896°N 0.1009°W
- Owned by: London Borough of Croydon
- Size: 9 hectares (22 acres)
- No. of graves: 50,000+
- No. of interments: 91,000+
- Find a Grave: Queen's Road Cemetery

Queen's Road Cemetery is a cemetery in Croydon, England. It opened in 1861, and was followed in 1897 by the larger Croydon Cemetery in Mitcham Road. Both cemeteries are now managed by the London Borough of Croydon.

Queen's Road Cemetery covers approximately 22 acres (89,000 m^{2}) and is in the north of the borough of Croydon, east of Croydon University Hospital and west of Selhurst railway station. It has about 50,000 graves and approximately 97,000 burials have taken place since it opened. The graves are shaded by large trees and landscaped with shrubbery beds.

== History ==
Overcrowding and the rise of urban centres in the 19th century made it necessary to establish cemetery plots outside the city limits. In order to cater for poorer members of the public, the Burial Acts of 1852–57 organised local burial boards throughout the country, which had a duty to provide burial grounds where interment would be cheap and decent. The Croydon Local Board of Health was appointed as a Burial Board by an Order in Council on 3 March 1859, and was responsible for establishing Queen's Road Cemetery.

In 1859, following the suggested closure of St John the Baptist (Croydon Parish Church) churchyard by Order of the Council, the Home Secretary approved the purchase of 22 acres (89,000 m^{2}) of land for the purpose of burials. St John the Baptist was, by Order of the Privy Council, allowed an extension to continue burials in churchyard until 1860, when Queen's Road Cemetery was to be used for services and interments.

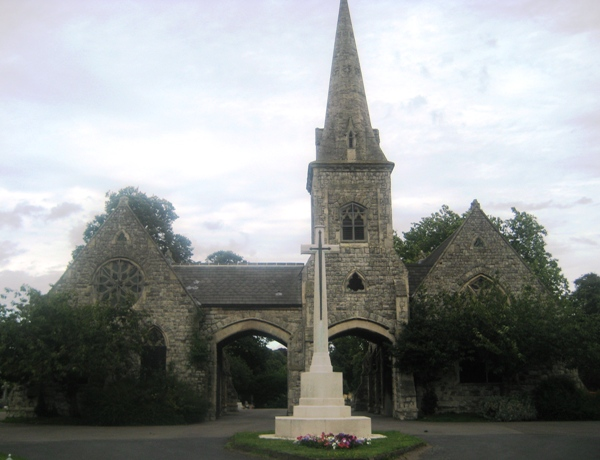
The disused mortuary chapels and Cross of Sacrifice to war graves in Queen's Road Cemetery

An award was given to E.C. Robbins, Arundel Street, the Strand, London, in October 1860 for the best design layout for the Queen's Road chapels. The design featured two mortuary chapels, each having a simple nave with open timbered roof, and the Episcopal chapel having the addition of a semi-octagonal apse at the east end. The chapels are no longer in use for burial services.

To accompany the chapels a Lodge was also built, which until recently was home to cemetery staff but is now in private ownership.

Croydon Borough Council paid £5079 in 1860 to purchase the land for the cemetery. Approximately 22 acres (89,000 m^{2}) were purchased at a cost of £200 per acre, and £8 per acre for a portion of tithes to give the poor (then known as ‘paupers’) a decent burial. The cost of the land, erection of buildings, walls, railings and laying out of grounds was £16,000.

Portions of the cemetery were set aside for Church of England, Nonconformists, Roman Catholic and the Society of Friends burials. Archbishop of Canterbury John Sumner consecrated the first section of the Church of England ground on Thursday 18 July 1861. Dr Thomas Grant, Archbishop of Southwark, blessed the Roman Catholic section on 28 August 1861.

In the first year of opening 63 consecrated burials took place and 20 unconsecrated burials. The approximate population of Croydon at the time was 30,663.

In the south-west corner of the cemetery stands a substantial brick public air-raid shelter.

== Persons buried ==
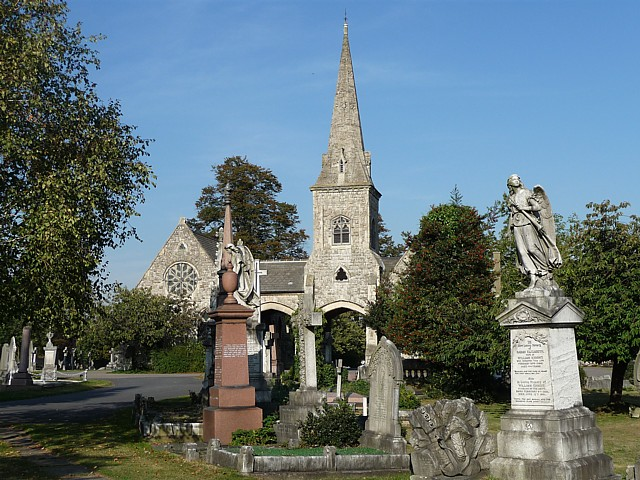
Cemetery chapel and monuments in Queen's Road Cemetery

The first person to be buried in the cemetery was Mr Thomas Garniss, a member of the Croydon Board of Guardians. The grave was purchased on 26 July 1861 for £9 4s10d.

Two of the largest purchased areas in Queen's Road Cemetery belong to the Ladies of Mary, sisters from the Roman Catholic religious order. All the brothers of the Christian Schools from 1904–51 lie together in the cemetery as do many of the parish priests of St Mary’s.

Street traders of Croydon have a number of graves within the cemetery known as ‘Surrey Street’ after the local Surrey Street Market.

Admiral Sir Stephen Lushington, 1803–1877, Crimean War veteran, captain of HMS Albion and governor of Greenwich Hospital, is buried here.

There are 181 Commonwealth service war graves, of both World Wars, in the cemetery. Hurricane Pilot Flying Officer Peter Carter who fought in the Battle of Britain is also buried in the cemetery.

The parents and sister of Victorian preacher Charles Spurgeon (1834–1892) are buried in the cemetery.

=== Other notable burials ===
- Joshua Allder, founder of Allders department store
- Reuben Barrow, Liberal MP for Bermondsey
- Francis Barraud of Lavers, Barraud and Westlake
- Edmund Duff, Vera Sydney, Violet Sydney, victims of the Croydon Poisoning Mystery in Birdhurst Rise, South Croydon are buried in a double grave (close to the entrance of the cemetery).
- Frederick Walters

John & Mary Harris. John Harris (1792–1873), (artist and facsimilist) was notable for designing Tracing-Boards used in Masonic Lodges worldwide. Worked also at the British Museum and produced a facsimile of Magna Carta in gold. He and his wife resided at The Asylum for Aged, Worthy and Decayed Freemasons, located in Freemason's Road, Croydon. They were in an unmarked grave until a headstone was erected by the Provincial Grand Lodge of Surrey and consecrated in September 2018.

== Wildlife ==
Like many urban cemeteries, Queen's Road provides a good localised habitat for wildlife in an otherwise largely built-up area. There is a wide variety of trees, bushes and shrubs, and a few areas of grass have been set aside to grow wild. Both green and great spotted woodpecker may be seen as well as the more usual jays, magpies, carrion crows, robins, thrushes and blackbirds.

Trees include yew, birch, beech, rowan, several species of pine and a number of blossoming fruit trees.
