= Alan Randle =

Alan Randle (15 May 1883 – 26 March 1970) was a British medical doctor and politician.

Born in the West Ham area of London, England. Randle moved with his family to Otago in New Zealand when only six months old. He was educated at the Otago Boys' High School, then studied medicine at University College Hospital in London. He qualified in 1908, and became a surgeon at St Olave's Hospital.

During World War I, Randle served with the Royal Army Medical Corps, and was present at Arras, Ypres and Passchendaele. For his work, he was awarded the Military Cross, and was promoted to become a major.

After the war, Randle returned to St Olave's, where he became concerned at the standard of local housing. This led him to join the Labour Party, and at the 1922 London County Council election, he was elected in Rotherhithe. He served for six years, and became deputy leader of the Labour group on the council, under Herbert Morrison.

In 1926, Randle became the superintendent of St Peter's Hospital, Covent Garden, later moving to Mile End Hospital and then St Giles' Hospital. In the role, he encouraged medical staff to develop specialisms and take higher degrees. He also developed one of the first psychiatric units in a general hospital. He retired in 1946, moving to Cork, where he died in 1970.
