= Alice Chapin =

American actress (1857–1934)

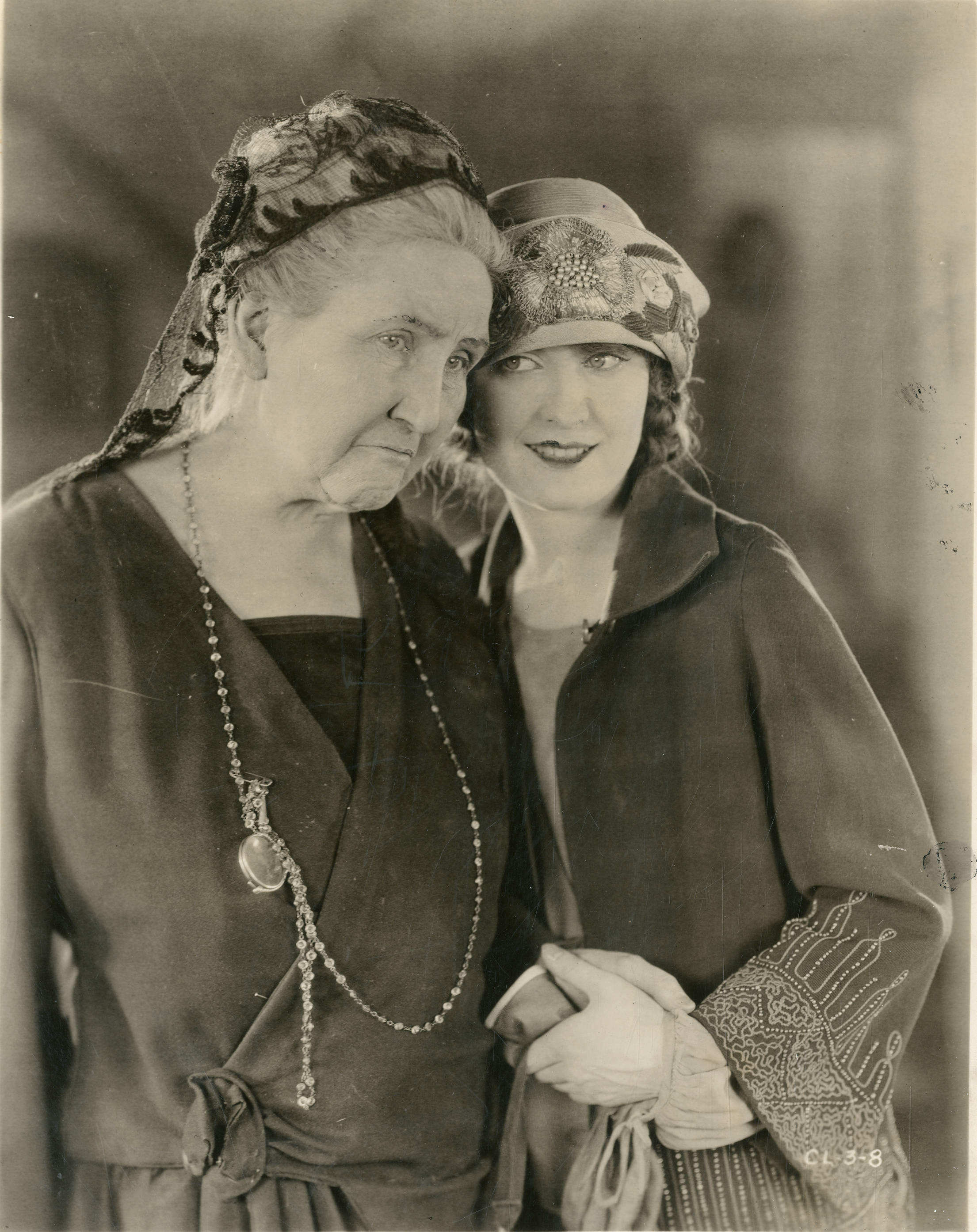
- Alice Chapin and Alyce Mills in the film Daughters of the Night (1924)
- Born: August 28, 1857; Keene, New Hampshire, U.S.
- Died: July 5, 1934 (Aged 76); Keene, New Hampshire, U.S.
- Spouse: Harvey Merrill Ferris
- Children: 2

Alice Chapin or Alice Ferris (August 28, 1857 – July 5, 1934) was an American actress, playwright and suffragette active in England. She returned to America and played roles in silent films.

== Life ==
Chapin was born in Keene, New Hampshire to Ephraim Atlas Chapin, who had interests in the railroad, and to Josephine, née Clark. Alice had an elder brother Alfred, who was elected as a Democrat to the 52nd United States Congress.

After 1868, she moved to Brooklyn, where she was successful in amateur dramatics, and her brother became a successful politician and lawyer. She made an unsuccessful marriage with a realtor, and her name was briefly Ellis until she obtained a divorce in June 1888. She had a son, Harold Chapin, and she moved to England taking with her a large inheritance from her mother. In England, she had a daughter, Elsie Chapin.

In London, her life involved professional acting. She appeared in important productions, including one The Websters, with her son Harold and his wife-to-be Calypso Valetta, at the Royalty Theatre. On a political basis, she was an active member of the Actresses' Franchise League. The league included many notable actresses among its members, and with their help, the League produced suffrage plays. Chapin wrote and adapted some of the plays.

Chapin was also a militant suffragette within the Women's Freedom League, and she was sentenced to jail in 1911. She and Alison Neilans splashed chemicals over the ballot papers in the 1909 Bermondsey by-election. The protest was intended to highlight that the Prime Minister had refused to see a deputation of suffrage campaigners who had been sitting outside the House of Commons since July. Chapin was successful in damaging many ballot papers, and Neilans damaged a few. Most of the ballot papers were still readable and John Dumphreys was elected. However, presiding officer George Thorley had chemicals splashed in his eye. At their trials the doctors said that Thorley may have a haze over his eyes for life but Thorley stated that he did not believe that injury had been intended. Some suffragettes believed that Thorley had exaggerated his injury and that the damage was due to someone applying ammonia after the incident in an attempt at treatment.

Chapin and Neilans were tried at the Old Bailey, and Neilans later published an account of their defence. Chapin was given a larger sentence than Neilans, but she was released two days after her under the "King's Pardon".

Meanwhile, her son Harold was following an acting career as well as writing and staging plays in London. He joined the Royal Army Medical Corps despite being an American. He was wounded and killed while volunteering at the Battle of Loos in 1915. The loss of his talent was compared to the death of Rupert Brooke. Alice appeared with Gerald du Maurier, Sydney Fairbrother, and Calypso Valetta in a memorial presentation of four of his plays. One of the plays, The Philosopher of Butterbiggens, was recreated in Provincetown, Massachusetts, with Elsie Chapin as the director.

Alice Chapin returned to the U.S., and by 1917, she appeared in silent films.

Chapin died in Keene, New Hampshire in 1934.

== Plays ==
- Shame (with E.H.C. Oliphant 1892)
- The Wrong Legs (1896)
- A Knight Errant (1906)
- The Happy Medium (with P. Gaye, 1909)
- Outlawed (Court, 1911) a dramatisation, with Mabel Collins, of the novel by Collins and Women's Freedom League leader Charlotte Despard

== Partial filmography ==
- Thais (1917)
- The Spreading Dawn (1917)
- By Hook or Crook (1918)
- Anne of Little Smoky (1921)
- Icebound (1924)
- Daughters of the Night (1924)
- Manhattan (1924)
- Argentine Love (1924)
- Youth for Sale (1924)
- The Crowded Hour (1925)
- Pearl of Love (1925)
