= Association for Moral and Social Hygiene =

British organisation founded in 1915 concerned with sexuality

Josephine Butler in 1876

The Association for Moral and Social Hygiene (AMSH) was founded in 1915 from the British Continental and General Federation for Abolition of Government Regulation of Prostitution and the Ladies' National Association to campaign for equality in how sexuality was policed, especially sex work. In 1962, it was renamed the Josephine Butler Society.

== History ==
In the late 19th-century in the United Kingdom, moral and social hygiene organisations were created to fight the Contagious Diseases Acts, which aimed to keep male soldiers and sailors healthy enough to fight by arresting and forcibly examining women suspected of being prostitutes. These included the British Continental and General Federation for Abolition of Government Regulation of Prostitution and the Ladies' National Association, formed by Josephine Butler in the 1860s.

The Association for Moral and Social Hygiene was formed from these two organisations in 1915 to advocate for gender equality. The AMSH was a member of the International Abolitionist Federation. It sought to abolish the state regulation of prostitution and instead punish third parties who benefited from sex work, such as brothel keepers or pimps. It fought against the parts of the Defence of the Realm Acts during World War I (and later World War II) that enabled prosecution of women suspected of prostitution.

Particularly between 1916 and 1930, the AMSH campaigned against solicitation laws.

The Association also campaigned on issues including sex education, sexual offences and age of consent, human trafficking, and sex tourism. It published the journal The Shield.

In the 1950s, the group spoke to the Wolfenden Committee on Homosexual Offences and Prostitution and criticised the Street Offences Act 1959. Key figures included Sir Charles Tarring as the Chair, Helen Wilson as honorary secretary, and Alison Neilans as assistant secretary and then general secretary. In 1962, it was renamed the Josephine Butler Society.
