= Harold Chapin =

British playwright and actor

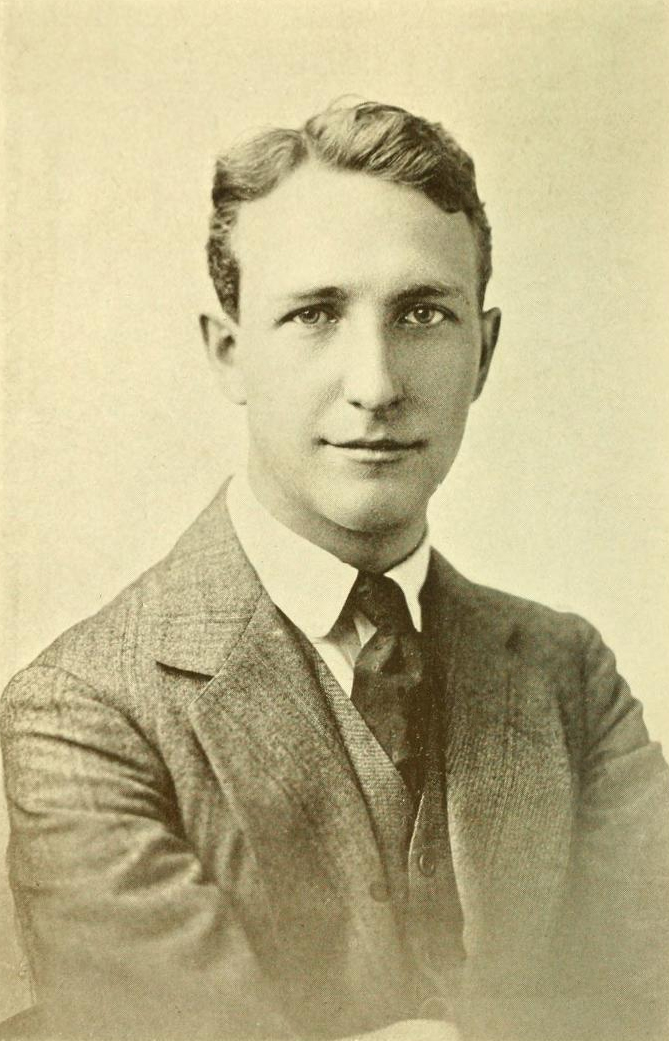
- Born: 15 February 1886; Brooklyn, Kings County, New York
- Died: 26 September 1915 (aged 29); Loos-en-Gohelle, France
- Spouse: Calypso Valetta (m. 1910)
- Children: 1
- Parent: Alice Chapin (mother)
- Military career
- Allegiance: United Kingdom
- Branch: Royal Army Medical Corps
- Service years: 1914-1915
- Rank: Lance Corporal
- Battles: Battle of Loos

Harold Chapin (15 February 1886 – 26 September 1915) was an American-born English actor and playwright. He served in the British Army during World War I.

== Life ==
Chapin was born in Brooklyn, New York, in 1886. His mother was Alice Chapin an actress and suffragette and his father was Harvey Merrill Ferris. His parents divorced and his mother took the three-year-old Harold to live in England where he was educated and she continued her career. In 1910 he married the actress Calypso Valetta (1884–1978); their son Harold Valetta Chapin (1911–1950) was also an actor.

Enlisting as a private in the 6th London Field Ambulance Royal Army Medical Corps of the British Army in September 1914, Chapin served as a lance corporal in France. He was killed in action at the age of 29 at the Battle of Loos in 1915.

Chapin's letters, written while he was training in the army and on service, were collected and published after his death.

== Career ==
Chapin's acting career began at age seven when he first appeared publicly in a Frank Benson production. He studied singing and appeared in touring and London productions and as well as working as an assistant stage manager and stage director. Between 1908 and 1914 he worked for the impresario Charles Frohman and for the director and manager Harley Granville Barker. He was also a producer with the Glasgow Repertory Theatre and two of his one-act comedies, Muddle-Annie and The Autocrat of the Coffee-Stall, were staged by that company. In January 1914 he appeared in Israel Zangwill's play The Melting Pot.

In December 1915 Alice Chapin, Calypso Valetta, Gerald du Maurier and Sydney Fairbrother appeared in a memorial performance of four of his plays: The Philosopher of Butterbiggins, Innocent and Annabel, The Dumb and the Blind and It's the Poor that 'Elps the Poor at the Queen's Theatre, London. The performance raised funds for a YMCA hut to accommodate soldiers at the front in France.

The novelist and playwright J.M. Barrie wrote the introduction to a collection of Chapin's plays: The New Morality, Elaine, Art and Opportunity, and The Marriage of Columbine. Barrie acknowledged Chapin's talent as a playwright.

His plays were produced throughout the UK and in New York City from the 1920s to the 1950s. The New Morality and The Threshold were broadcast on the radio in 1927 and Art and Opportunity was televised in 1953. The New Morality was performed at the Finborough Theatre, London, in 2005 and in New York City in 2015.

Chapin's plays were often social dramas (The Dumb and the Blind and It's the Poor that 'Elps the Poor) but he was also an established writer of comedy (The Marriage of Columbine and The Philosopher of Butterbiggins).

== Bibliography ==
- Augustus in Search of a Father (1910) One Act
- The Marriage of Columbine (1910) Four Acts
- Muddle-Annie (1911) One Act
- The Autocrat of the Coffee-Stall (1911) One Act
- The Dumb and the Blind (1911) Originally titled Deaf and Blind
- The Dumb and the Blind (1911) One Act
- Innocent and Annabel (1912) One Act
- Elaine (1912) Three Acts
- Art & Opportunity (1912) Three Acts
- Wonderful Grandmama (1912) Two parts
- It's the Poor that 'Elps the Poor One Act (1913)
- Every Man for His Own (1914) One Act
- Dropping the Baby (1914) One Act
- The Philosopher of Butterbiggins (1915) One Act
- The New Morality (1920) Three Acts
- The Threshold (1921) One Act
- The Well Made Dress Coat Four Acts

== Sources ==
- Harold Chapin, Sidney Dark - Soldier and dramatist: being the letters of Harold Chapin, American citizen...
