= Reuben Barrow =

English magistrate and politician

Sir Reuben Vincent Barrow (27 April 1838 – 13 February 1918) was an English magistrate and Liberal Party politician. He was the Member of Parliament (MP) for Bermondsey from 1892 to 1895.

Barrow was elected at the 1892 general election as MP for Bermondsey, defeating the sitting Conservative MP Alfred Lafone. However, he served only three years in Parliament, losing his seat to Lafone at the 1895 general election. After his defeat, he did not stand again.

During his time in the House of Commons he introduced the London (Equalization of Rates) Bill, which was enacted in 1894. In its first ten years of operation, about £6million was distributed from richer parishes to poorer ones.

He had moved to Croydon in 1873, and when the town was given its borough charter in 1883, he was elected to the council, becoming the third Mayor of Croydon in 1885. He was also Chairman of Croydon magistrates bench for 21 years. He was a Commissioner of income tax, and an active member of the Baptist Church.

Barrow was made a freeman of Croydon in 1909, and was knighted in the 1912 New Year Honours; the title was conferred on 8 March 1912.

Barrow died at this home in Croydon on 13 February 1918, aged 79, and was buried in Queen's Road Cemetery, after a funeral service at West Croydon Tabernacle.

Parliament of the United Kingdom
Preceded by Alfred Lafone	Member of Parliament for Bermondsey; 1892 – 1895	Succeeded by Alfred Lafone
