= Harold Glanville =

British politician

Member of Parliament for Bermondsey West Bermondsey (1910–1918)
- In office 10 February 1910 – 15 November 1922
- Preceded by: John Dumphreys
- Succeeded by: Alfred Salter

Personal details
- Born: Harold James Glanville; 5 June 1854 Bermondsey, London, UK
- Died: 27 September 1930 (aged 76) West Hill, Sydenham, London
- Party: Liberal
- Other political affiliations: Progressive
- Spouse(s): Hannah Abbott (1881–1918); Bertha Nimmo (1918–30)
- Children: 4
- Relatives: Harold Glanville (Son)
- Education: Deptford Grammar School

Harold James Glanville (5 June 1854 – 27 September 1930) was an English businessman and Liberal Party politician.

== Family and education ==
Glanville was born in Bermondsey in south London the son of James Glanville, a Chartered Accountant of 15 Great St Helens, in the City of London. He was educated at Deptford Grammar School. In 1881 he married Hannah Elizabeth, the daughter of James and Hannah Abbott of Bermondsey. They had three sons and a daughter. One of their sons was James Harold Abbott Glanville (1884–1966) who also had a career in public service and was President of the Liberal Party in 1959–60. Hannah Glanville died in 1891. Harold was married for a second time in 1918 to Bertha Nimmo, a widow from Brockley.

== Career ==
On leaving school, Glanville entered the General Post Office but afterwards he worked for a while in his father's office. In 1883 he entered into partnership with his father-in-law and for over 30 years carried on the business of mill furnishers, being head of the firm of James White Abbott & Co. However he always took a keen interest in public affairs.

== Politics ==
=== Bermondsey politics ===
Glanville started off in local politics. He served on the Bermondsey Vestry, a body set up under the Metropolis Management Act 1855 as a second tier of local government in London. In 1889 he was prominent in a campaign to stop the provision of meals and refreshments to vestrymen and officials on the rates. At this time Glanville was Secretary of the Bermondsey Liberal and Radical Association and was involved in a court case arising from a disturbance at a Vestry meeting where members of the public were being excluded from the proceedings.

=== London County Council ===
Glanville graduated from the Vestry to the London County Council (LCC). He was first elected to the LCC for the Rotherhithe Division in 1898 as a Progressive. He was re-elected in 1901 and 1904. During his time on the Council he was chosen to represent the LCC on the Metropolitan Water Board. He was last re-elected to the LCC for Rotherhithe in 1907. He lost his Bermondsey West seat at the 1922 London County Council election. During his years on the Council Glanville held many local positions in the borough of Bermondsey and he also served as a Justice of the Peace for the County of London.

=== Parliament ===
Glanville's first Parliamentary contest was for the constituency of Rotherhithe at the 1892 general election but he lost to the Conservative John Cumming Macdona by 1,230 votes.

His next chance came in 1909 when he was adopted as Liberal candidate for Bermondsey. There had been a by-election in the seat on 28 October 1909. The sitting Liberal MP, George Joseph Cooper had died and the Liberals adopted Spencer Leigh Hughes, a journalist, to contest the constituency. However, the by-election was won by the Conservative John Dumphreys who turned a Liberal majority of 1,759 at the 1906 general election into a Conservative majority of 987 – the intervention of a Labour candidate who got 1,435 votes having split the anti-Tory vote. Hughes then moved to Stockport where he was elected in the general election of January 1910. This gave the Bermondsey Liberals the chance to pick a local man and Glanville was the successful applicant. He duly won the seat back in January 1910 in a straight fight against Dumphreys. He held the seat in the general election of December 1910 and served until 1918 when the constituency was abolished in boundary changes. A General Election had been expected to take place in either 1914 or 1915, at which, Glanville was expected to face a challenge, not only from a Unionist but also from an Independent Labour Party candidate, Dr Alfred Salter.

During the earlier part of his Parliamentary career, Glanville was credited with playing a prominent part, as a backbencher, in the Liberal Party's programme of social reform legislation.

Glanville then switched to the new seat of Bermondsey West. At the 1918 general election he was opposed by a Coalition Liberal, i.e. a member of that section of the party supporting Prime Minister David Lloyd George in his Coalition government with the Conservative Party. This candidate, Mr C R Scriven, presumably received the Coalition Coupon. Glanville also faced Labour opposition and an Independent candidate supported by the National Federation of Discharged and Demobilized Soldiers and Sailors.

During this period of his time in Parliament, Glanville assumed duties for the government in relation to claims and allowances arising from the First World War and he was helped in discharging these duties by his son, H J A Glanville, who later went on to be a Progressive member of the LCC.

Glanville did not stand for re-election in 1922 as he was almost 70 years old by this time. However he earlier nearly got into the House of Lords. In the struggle between the Liberal government and the House of Lords over the Parliament Act 1911, H H Asquith proposed to the King the creation of many new Liberal peers to ensure the measure could be carried if the Lords continued to obstruct. According to a list discovered in Asquith's papers Glanville was named as someone who would be nominated as one of these peers.

== Death ==
Glanville, who had been seriously ill for some time, died at his home, Westwood, West Hill, Sydenham on 27 September 1930 at the age of 76 years.

== See also ==
- List of members of London County Council 1889 - 1919

Parliament of the United Kingdom
| Preceded by John Dumphreys | Member of Parliament for Bermondsey; January 1910–1918 | constituency abolished |
| New constituency | Member of Parliament for Bermondsey West; 1918–1922 | Succeeded by Alfred Salter |
