= Simon Kitson =

British-New Zealand historian (born 1967)

Simon Kitson (born c. 1967) is a British and naturalized New Zealand historian and author.

== Life ==
Kitson did his undergraduate studies at the University of Ulster and his post-graduate studies at the University of Sussex, under the supervision of Roderick Kedward. His doctoral thesis on the Marseille Police, was examined by Mark Mazower and Clive Emsley.

== Career ==
He lectured in French Studies at the University of Birmingham before becoming director of research at the University of London Institute in Paris (ULIP). Dr Kitson left ULIP in April 2011 and became a senior research fellow at the Institute of Historical Research. Kitson is currently an Associate Professor of French Studies at the University of Auckland, New Zealand. He is a Fellow of the Royal Historical Society and a fellow of the Alexander von Humboldt Foundation. He is also known for the web resource on Vichy France that he set up and for being the founder of the Facebook group 'Simon Kitson's France: News and Discussion'. He is British Correspondent of the French history journal Vingtième Siècle. and is on the editorial board of the Journal of War and Culture Studies.

Kitson has worked extensively on the French police and counter-espionage services. He is also a specialist on Vichy France, on which he published Vichy et la Chasse aux Espions Nazis with Autrement of Paris in 2005, The Hunt for Nazi Spies with the University of Chicago Press in 2008. and Police and Politics in Marseille, 1936–1945 with Brill of Amsterdam in 2014.

== Publications ==
Books

- Police and Politics in Marseille, 1936–1945, Amsterdam, Brill, 2014
- The Hunt for Nazi Spies, Chicago, University of Chicago Press, 2008
- Vichy et la chasse aux espions nazis, Paris, Autrement, 2005
- (with Hanna Diamond) Vichy, Resistance, Liberation (essays in honour of Rod Kedward), Oxford, Berg, 2005
- 'The Marseille Police in their context from Popular Front to Liberation', D Phil thesis, University of Sussex, 1995
