= 1909 Bermondsey by-election =

UK parliamentary by-election

← 1906	28 October 1909	Jan. 1910 →

Candidate	Dumphreys	Hughes	Salter
Party	Conservative	Liberal	Labour
Popular vote	4,278	3,291	1,435
Percentage	47.5%	36.6%	15.9%
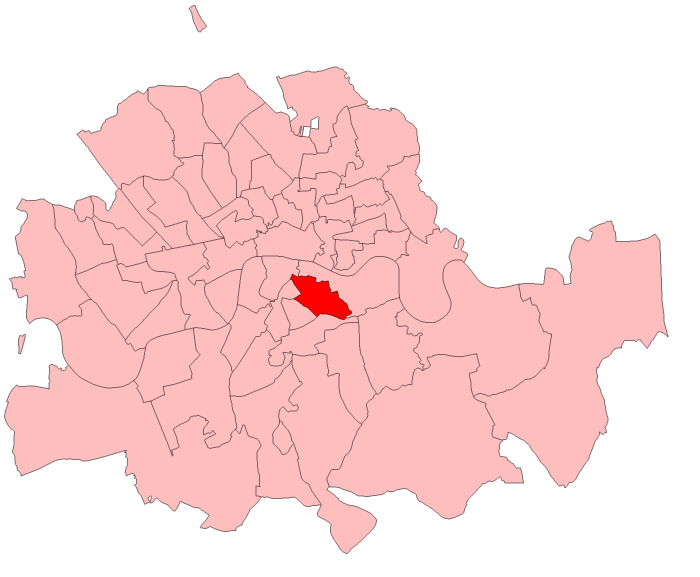
MP before election
George Cooper
Liberal
Subsequent MP
Harold Glanville
Liberal

The 1909 Bermondsey by-election was a by-election held on 28 October 1909 for the British House of Commons constituency of Bermondsey in South East London. It returned one Member of Parliament (MP) to the House of Commons of the United Kingdom, elected by the first past the post voting system. Two suffragettes who tried to disrupt the men's election damaged the presiding officer and the ballots.

== Vacancy ==
The by-election was called following the death of George Cooper, who had gained the seat as part of the Liberal Party victory in the 1906 general election.

== Electoral history ==
The seat had been Liberal since they gained it at the last General Election in 1906;

Cooper

General election January 1906
Party	Candidate	Votes	%	±%
Liberal	George Cooper	4,775	61.3	+13.2
Conservative	Henry Cust	3,016	38.7	−13.2
Majority		1,759	22.6	N/A
Turnout		7,791	73.4	+4.4
Liberal gain from Conservative		Swing	+13.2	

== Candidates ==
The Labour party intervened in the contest having not stood in 1906. They selected 36-year-old Alfred Salter who had recently joined the Independent Labour Party. Back in 1906, Salter had been elected in succession to Cooper as the Progressive member for Bermondsey on the London County Council. On 8 October, Salter was officially announced as the party's candidate, just one day after the death of Cooper. The local Liberal Association selected 51-year-old journalist Spencer Leigh Hughes to defend the seat. He was not previously connected to the area and had unsuccessfully stood as Liberal candidate in the 1907 Jarrow by-election. Hughes was adopted unanimously as the candidate for the by-election. The local Liberals might have chosen Harold Glanville, a Bermondsey man who represented neighbouring Rotherhithe on the London County Council. With a General election pending, the Conservatives had already selected their candidate, Assheton Pownall. However, he was out of the country at the time and unable to campaign. Forced to find someone else at short notice, they settled on a local man, 64-year-old Cllr.John Dumphreys as their candidate. He had worked as a leather dresser, in an industry which was quite significant locally. In 1907 he became Mayor of Bermondsey. He was a supporter of Tariff Reform.

== Campaign ==
Polling Day was fixed for the 28 October, just 21 days after the death of Cooper. There was a significant speech made by Chancellor of the Exchequer, David Lloyd George, at Limehouse on 30 July 1909 in which he outlined the proposals in the People's Budget. Since then, there had been no by-election in which to gauge public reaction to these proposals. The proposals therefore became central to the campaign. The Conservatives campaigned against the radicalism of the Liberals and their idea of massive state intervention in welfare. Hughes and the local Liberals embraced this New Liberal approach. Dumphreys was critical of the Liberal government's failure to act on the recommendation of the Poor Law Commission, which had been initiated by the previous Conservative government. In particular, he pressed for wholesale reform of the workhouse system, for better treatment of the deserving poor, and removal of the taint of pauper from children. "For every child a chance" was his philosophy. The Liberal campaign faced particular difficulties because their candidate was an outsider while both the Conservative and Labour candidates were local.

== Suffragette protest ==
On polling day, Alice Chapin and Alison Neilans from the Women's Freedom League poured corrosive liquids over ballot boxes in protest at the Prime Minister's refusal to meet with suffrage campaigners. A presiding officer, George Thornley, had his eye damaged. He testified at Chapin's trial that this was an accidental consequence of the attempt to damage ballots. The count was delayed while ballot papers were carefully examined, 83 ballot papers were damaged but legible but two ballot papers became indecipherable.

== Result ==
Dumphreys gained the seat for the Conservatives and Unionists, though with less than half the votes;

Bermondsey by-election, 1909
Party	Candidate	Votes	%	±%
Conservative	John Dumphreys	4,278	47.5	+8.8
Liberal	Spencer Leigh Hughes	3,291	36.6	−24.7
Labour	Alfred Salter	1,435	15.9	New
Majority		987	10.9	N/A
Turnout		9,004	73.6	+0.2
Conservative gain from Liberal		Swing	+16.8	

== Aftermath ==
Dumphreys would lose the seat to the Liberals eleven weeks later in the general election, but not to Hughes who was to be elected as Liberal MP for Stockport, but this time to a Bermondsey man. After finishing bottom of the poll in the by-election, the Labour party withdrew from the contest;

General election January 1910
Party	Candidate	Votes	%	±%
Liberal	Harold Glanville	5,477	54.9	+18.3
Conservative	John Dumphreys	4,508	45.1	−2.4
Majority		969	9.8	N/A
Turnout		9,985	82.4	+8.8
Liberal gain from Conservative		Swing	+10.4	

Salter later became MP for West Bermondsey in 1922. The two suffragette protesters Alice Chapin and Alison Neilans, were sentenced to three months each in Holloway Prison.
