= James Allan Gillison =

British-Australian doctor and politician

James Allan Gillison (22 June 1892 – 15 August 1975) was a British-Australian doctor and politician.

Born in Melbourne to a Scottish family, Gillison grew up in New Zealand, and he studied engineering at Otago University. He then moved to Scotland, and studied medicine at the University of Edinburgh, graduating in 1920.

In his youth, Gillison was an evangelical Christian, but he moved away from this and became a socialist. He joined Alfred Salter's general practice in Bermondsey, in London. Like Salter, he joined the Labour Party, and at the 1934 London County Council election, Gillison was elected to represent Rotherhithe. He devoted much time to supporting refugees from the Spanish Civil War, and later from Nazi Germany.

After World War II, Gillison became governor of Guy's Hospital, and developed an interest in hypnotism, which he used to treat addictions. By 1951, he had become disillusioned with the Labour Party, claiming that it was too reliant on the trade unions and was uninterested in individual liberty. He resigned from the party and from the council. He travelled to New Zealand and, while there, joined the British Conservative Party.

Gillison retired to Jersey, where he died in 1975.
