= J. E. Smith =

British political activist

John E. Smith (1862 or 1863 – 16 May 1912) was a British trade unionist and political activist.

Smith came to prominence as the Leeds District Secretary of the National Union of Gasworkers and General Labourers. Under his leadership, membership in the city grew rapidly. He served on the Leeds Trades and Labour Council, including a period as its president, and on numerous local committees. He was considered to be on the right wing of the union, suspicious of the Independent Labour Party, and avoiding industrial action.

Smith was a supporter of the Labour Party, and stood unsuccessfully for Leeds City Council in the West ward. He came from an Irish Catholic background, and was also a member of the Irish Nationalist League. At the 1906 UK general election, he was credited with gaining the backing of Irish immigrants for James O'Grady in Leeds East.

1910 saw the death of Pete Curran, president of the Gasworkers' Union, and Smith was elected as his replacement. He also replaced Curran on the Management Committee of the General Federation of Trade Unions. In addition, he represented the union at the Trades Union Congress, and was elected for several years in a row to its standing orders committee.

Smith became seriously ill early in 1912. He underwent two operations, but died in May.

Trade union offices
| Preceded by William Cockayne | Leeds District Secretary of the National Union of Gasworkers and General Labourers; 1894–1912 | Succeeded by Walter Wood |
| Preceded by Pete Curran | President of the National Union of Gasworkers and General Labourers; 1910–1912 | Succeeded by J. R. Clynes |
