= Roderick Kedward (politician) =

Rev. Roderick Kedward

Member of Parliament for Ashford
- In office 30 May 1929 – 27 October 1931
- Preceded by: Samuel Strang Steel
- Succeeded by: Michael Knatchbull

Member of Parliament for Bermondsey West
- In office 6 December 1923 – 29 October 1924
- Preceded by: Alfred Salter
- Succeeded by: Alfred Salter

Personal details
- Born: Roderick Morris Kedward; 5 March 1881 Westwell, Kent, UK
- Died: 5 March 1937 (aged 56)
- Party: Liberal
- Other political affiliations: National Liberal
- Spouse: Daisy Fedrick
- Children: 6
- Relatives: Rod Kedward (Grandson)
- Education: Richmond College
- Occupation: Wesleyan minister

Rev. Roderick Morris Kedward (14 September 1881 – 5 March 1937) was a Wesleyan minister and a Liberal Party politician in the United Kingdom.

== Early life ==
Roderick Kedward was born at Westwell in Kent, one of fourteen children of a local farmer, originally from Hereford but resident in Kent since the 1870s. He became a minister in 1903 having trained at Richmond College. In 1906, he married Daisy Fedrick and they had three sons and three daughters.

In 1908, Kedward was made minister of three Wesleyan congregations in Hull and earned the nickname 'the fighting parson' for physically protecting a woman from her wife-beating husband.

During the First World War, Kedward served in Egypt and France. He was invalided out of the army in October 1916 with 'trench fever' but served as president of ex-servicemen's associations after the war.

== Political career ==
Kedward unsuccessfully contested the Kingston upon Hull Central constituency at the 1918 general election, losing by a long way to a Conservative who had been favoured with the Lloyd George coalition 'coupon'. By then he had established a considerable local connection with Hull having been a minister of religion in the city for seven years and having founded the Kings Hall Brotherhood. He stood in Bermondsey West at the 1922 general election but was soundly beaten by the Labour candidate, a former Progressive (Liberal) member of the London County Council, Dr. Alfred Salter. At the next election in 1923, there was a straight fight between Kedward and Salter and Kedward was elected as the constituency's Member of Parliament (MP) by uniting the anti-Labour vote. He been associated with Bermondsey for some years having been chairman of the finance committee of the borough council and a member of the board of guardians. However Labour surged back the following year, a year in which the Liberal vote slumped badly all over the country and he was defeated at the 1924 general election.

Transferring his political allegiance to his original home area, Kedward stood at the 1929 general election for Ashford in Kent. He won a remarkable victory with a swing of over 20% from the Conservatives to the Liberals. During this time, Kedward was strongly associated with the National Tithe-payers Association, a group which campaigned against the collection of tithes by the Church of England mainly for the upkeep of the clergy and which was unevenly levied across the country, hitting some areas harder than others. In 1931, having sided with the Simonite faction in the Liberal party, Kedward fought Ashford as a Liberal National but was defeated as the local Conservatives refused to endorse his candidacy, seeing him as too radical and disliking his overt non-conformism (anti-tithe stance). They put up their own candidate against him. He was unsuccessful again at the 1933 by-election (this time as an anti-government Liberal) following his successor's elevation to the House of Lords.

== Personal life ==
At the time of his death from the sudden onset of a duodenal ulcer at the relatively young age of 55 years, Kedward was superintendent of the South London Mission. His successor praised his energy and said that Kedward had worked himself to death serving his community.

His grandson Rod Kedward was a historian of 20th-century France.

Parliament of the United Kingdom
| Preceded by Alfred Salter | Member of Parliament for Bermondsey West; 1923–1924 | Succeeded by Alfred Salter |
| Preceded by Samuel Strang Steel | Member of Parliament for Ashford; 1929–1931 | Succeeded by Michael Knatchbull |
