= Bermondsey West =

Parliamentary constituency in the United Kingdom, 1918–1950

- Former borough constituency for the House of Commons
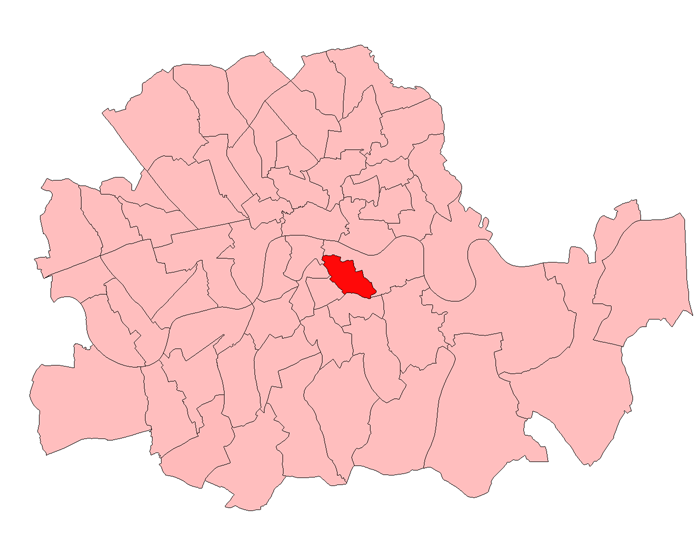
- Bermondsey West within London

1918–1950
- Seats: one
- Created from: Bermondsey and Rotherhithe
- Replaced by: Bermondsey

Bermondsey West was a parliamentary constituency centred on the Bermondsey district of South London. It returned one Member of Parliament (MP) to the House of Commons of the Parliament of the United Kingdom.

The constituency was created for the 1918 general election and abolished for the 1950 general election.

== Boundaries ==
The wards of Bermondsey Metropolitan Borough in 1916

The constituency, when it was created in 1918, comprised the wards numbered One, Two, Three and Four of the Metropolitan Borough of Bermondsey, in the County of London. This was the south-western part of the borough, and was similar in extent to the preceding Bermondsey Division of the parliamentary borough of Southwark.

It covered South Bermondsey ward and most of London Bridge & West Bermondsey ward, together with small sections of North Bermondsey, Chaucer and Old Kent Road wards, in the modern day London Borough of Southwark.

== Members of Parliament ==
| Election | Member | Party | Notes |
|---|---|---|---|
| 1918 | Harold Glanville | Liberal | Member for main predecessor seat (1910–1918) |
| 1922 | Alfred Salter | Labour | |
| 1923 | Roderick Kedward | Liberal | |
| 1924 | Alfred Salter | Labour | |
| 1945 | Richard Sargood | Labour | |
| 1950 | constituency abolished: see Bermondsey | | |

== Election results ==
=== Election in the 1910s ===
Harold Glanville

General election 1918: Bermondsey West
| Party | | Candidate | Votes | % |
|---|---|---|---|---|
| | Liberal | Harold Glanville | 4,260 | 40.5 |
| C | National Liberal | Charles Scriven | 2,998 | 28.5 |
| | Labour | Alfred Salter | 1,956 | 18.6 |
| | NFDDSS | Harry Becker | 1,294 | 12.3 |
| Majority | | | 1,262 | 12.0 |
| Turnout | | | 10,508 | 45.5 |
| Registered electors | | | 23,100 | |
| | Liberal win (new seat) | | | |
C indicates candidate endorsed by the coalition government.

=== Election in the 1920s ===
General election 1922: Bermondsey West
| Party | Candidate | Votes | % | ±% |
|---|---|---|---|---|
| Labour | Alfred Salter | 7,550 | 44.6 | +26.0 |
| Liberal | Roderick Kedward | 5,225 | 30.9 | –9.7 |
| National Liberal | Charles Scriven | 2,814 | 16.6 | –11.9 |
| Ind. Unionist | Charles Nordon | 1,328 | 7.9 | New |
| Majority | | 2,325 | 13.7 | N/A |
| Turnout | | 16,917 | 64.6 | +19.2 |
| Registered electors | | 26,168 | | |
| Labour gain from Liberal | | Swing | +17.8 | |

General election 1923: Bermondsey West
| Party | Candidate | Votes | % | ±% |
|---|---|---|---|---|
| Liberal | Roderick Kedward | 9,186 | 52.5 | +21.7 |
| Labour | Alfred Salter | 8,298 | 47.5 | +2.8 |
| Majority | | 888 | 5.1 | N/A |
| Turnout | | 17,484 | 66.1 | +1.4 |
| Registered electors | | 26,456 | | |
| Liberal gain from Labour | | Swing | +9.4 | |

General election 1924: Bermondsey West
| Party | Candidate | Votes | % | ±% |
|---|---|---|---|---|
| Labour | Alfred Salter | 11,578 | 57.2 | +9.7 |
| Liberal | Roderick Kedward | 8,676 | 42.8 | –9.7 |
| Majority | | 2,902 | 14.3 | N/A |
| Turnout | | 20,254 | 75.0 | +9.0 |
| Registered electors | | 26,989 | | |
| Labour gain from Liberal | | Swing | +9.7 | |

General election 1929: Bermondsey West
| Party | Candidate | Votes | % | ±% |
|---|---|---|---|---|
| Labour | Alfred Salter | 13,231 | 60.3 | +3.1 |
| Liberal | Leonard Stein | 4,865 | 22.2 | –20.7 |
| Unionist | Herbert Butcher | 3,852 | 17.6 | New |
| Majority | | 8,366 | 38.0 | +23.8 |
| Turnout | | 21,948 | 66.6 | –8.5 |
| Registered electors | | 32,963 | | |
| Labour hold | | Swing | +11.9 | |

=== Election in the 1930s ===
General election 1931: Bermondsey West
| Party | Candidate | Votes | % | ±% |
|---|---|---|---|---|
| Labour | Alfred Salter | 10,039 | 48.1 | –12.2 |
| Conservative | Norman Bower | 9,948 | 47.7 | +30.1 |
| Communist | Wal Hannington | 873 | 4.2 | New |
| Majority | | 91 | 0.4 | –37.7 |
| Turnout | | 20,860 | 63.4 | –3.2 |
| Registered electors | | 32,904 | | |
| Labour hold | | Swing | –21.1 | |

General election 1935: Bermondsey West
| Party | Candidate | Votes | % | ±% |
|---|---|---|---|---|
| Labour | Alfred Salter | 12,603 | 62.2 | +14.0 |
| National Liberal | Francis Glanville | 7,674 | 37.8 | –9.8 |
| Majority | | 4,929 | 24.3 | +23.9 |
| Turnout | | 20,277 | 65.8 | +2.4 |
| Registered electors | | 30,803 | | |
| Labour hold | | Swing | +11.9 | |

- Glanville was a son of the former MP Harold Glanville. Conservative candidate Francis Howard Collier withdrew when Glanville gave an undertaking to support the National Government.

=== Election in the 1940s ===
General election 1945: Bermondsey West
| Party | Candidate | Votes | % | ±% |
|---|---|---|---|---|
| Labour | Richard Sargood | 8,139 | 72.2 | +10.0 |
| National Liberal | W. Bernard Pemberton | 2,238 | 19.8 | –18.0 |
| Liberal | Francis Collier | 903 | 8.0 | New |
| Majority | | 5,901 | 52.3 | +28.0 |
| Turnout | | 11,280 | 66.3 | +0.5 |
| Registered electors | | 17,004 | | |
| Labour hold | | Swing | +14.0 | |
