= Sidney Stranks =

British trade unionist

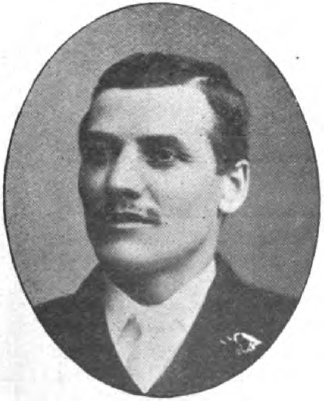
Sidney Stranks, about 1905.

Sidney Stranks (c.1868 – September 1953) was a British trade unionist.

Born in Aylesbury, Stranks completed an apprenticeship in Lichfield. He joined the Operative Society of Masons, Quarrymen and Allied Trades of England in 1888 and became involved in the campaign for independent labour movement representation on political bodies. At the 1906 general election, he was selected to stand for Croydon by the Labour Representation Committee, although he took third place with 20.2% of the votes cast.

Although Stranks did not stand for Parliament again, he was elected to Lambeth Borough Council, and then in 1928 was elected to London County Council, representing Rotherhithe. He was re-elected in 1931, and stood down in 1934.

The Operative Society of Masons became part of the Amalgamated Union of Building Trade Workers in 1921, and Stranks remained involved to the end of his life, receiving a medal for sixty years' service in 1948. He died in 1953, the last survivor of all the candidates of the Labour Representation Committee.
