= Pete Curran =

British trade unionist and politician

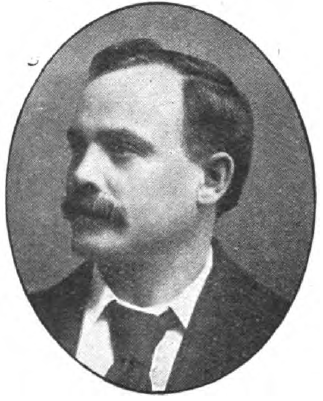
Curran, about 1905

Peter Francis Curran (28 March 1860 – 14 February 1910) was a British trade unionist and politician.

Born Patrick Francis Curran in Glasgow, to a Catholic family of Irish origin, Curran became known as "Pete" at an early age. He left school at the age of eleven, training as a blacksmith and working at a steel plant. Always interested in politics, he joined the Irish Land League, but was impressed by Henry George's speeches, and transferred to the Scottish Land Restoration League in 1880. He married in 1881, and around this time also joined the Social Democratic Federation (SDF).

Late in the 1880s, Curran moved to London to work at the Royal Arsenal. He worked with Will Thorne to found the National Union of Gasworkers and General Labourers, and in 1889, he became the union's full-time secretary for the West of England. In October 1890, in Plymouth, Curran and two other union leaders were fined £20 each for intimidation against George Treleaven, a coal merchant who employed both union and non-union dockers to unload coal shipments. The following year this conviction was overturned by the Court of Appeal, which ruled that notifying an employer that union dockers would no longer work for him if he continued to employ non-union dockers, was not a qualified intimidation. The case Curran v. Treleaven became immediately famous and, with newfound fame, Curran moved back to London to take up the post of national organiser of the gasworkers' union.

While remaining a member of the SDF, Curran joined the Fabian Society and was a founder member of the Independent Labour Party (ILP). He was a member of the ILP's National Administrative Council from 1893 to 1898, and stood for the party in Barrow at the 1895 general election, but won only 6.9% of the votes cast. His next contest was the 1897 Barnsley by-election, where he took just over 1,000 votes, only 9.7% of the total, and was attacked by Ben Pickard, General Secretary of the Yorkshire Miners' Association, for his socialist politics, and with claims that he had abandoned his wife.

Curran married his second wife, Marian Barry, a prominent women's labour activist, by 1898, and the couple had two sons and two daughters. Around this time, the couple were active opponents of the Second Boer War, and Curran resigned from the Fabian Society in protest at its support for the conflict.

In 1899, Curran was a founder of the General Federation of Trade Unions (GFTU) serving as its first chairman. Although he was well known for his passionate speech at Trades Union Congress (TUC) meetings, he was privately dismissive of its leadership, and hoped that the GFTU would provide a way for unions to bypass and possibly supersede it. He was also prominent in the formation of the Labour Representation Committee (LRC), forerunner of the Labour Party, which he saw as sharing the same aims as the GFTU. In 1905, he arranged the creation of the Joint Board of the TUC, GFTU and LRC, and this marked the period in which the GFTU enjoyed the greatest influence.

Curran stood for the LRC in Jarrow at the 1906 general election. Although he was narrowly defeated in a contest against the sitting Liberal Party MP, he stood again at the 1907 Jarrow by-election. On this occasion, he also faced Unionist Party and Irish Nationalist opposition, and these candidates took enough of the Liberal vote that he won the seat.

By this time, Curran was in poor health, principally due to his drinking. He was arrested and fined in 1909 for being drunk and incapable, and he developed cirrhosis of the liver. He lost his seat in another close contest at the January 1910 general election, and died shortly afterwards, aged 49.

Parliament of the United Kingdom
Preceded by Charles Palmer	Member of Parliament for Jarrow; 1907 – 1910	Succeeded by Godfrey Palmer
Trade union offices
Preceded by Will Watkinson	President of the National Union of Gasworkers and General Labourers; 1894–1910	Succeeded by J. E. Smith
Preceded by James Haslam and Alexander Wilkie	Trades Union Congress representative to the American Federation of Labour; 1900; With: John Weir	Succeeded by Francis Chandler and Ben Tillett
Preceded by New position	Chairman of the General Federation of Trade Unions; 1899 – 1910	Succeeded by Allan Gee
