= Rod Kedward =

British historian (1937–2023)

- Born: Harry Roderick Kedward; 26 March 1937; Hawkhurst, England
- Died: 29 April 2023 (aged 86)
- Spouse: Carol Wimbleton (m. 1965)
- Children: 2

Academic background
- Education: Worcester College, Oxford; St Antony's College, Oxford

Academic work
- Institutions: University of Sussex
- Main interests: French Resistance

Harry Roderick Kedward (26 March 1937 – 29 April 2023) was a British historian at the University of Sussex, known for his study of the French Resistance.

== Personal life ==
Born in 1937 at Hawkhurst, Kent, Kedward spent his early life in Goldthorpe (Yorkshire), Tenterden (Kent) and in Bath, where he obtained a scholarship to attend Kingswood School. He then studied at Worcester College and St Antony's College, Oxford, before being recruited as a lecturer at the University of Sussex in 1962. He became professor of history in 1991.

Kedward married Carol Wimbleton in 1965, and they had two children. He was the grandson of Roderick Morris Kedward (1881–1937), Liberal MP for Ashford, Kent between 1929 and 1931. Kedward was an active member of the Labour Party, who held what The Guardian described as "anarchist sympathies", and wrote for the Brighton Voice in the 1970s.

Kedward died on 29 April 2023, at the age of 86.

== Major works ==
Kedward specialized in the history of Vichy France and of the Resistance. Oral history formed a central part of Kedward's historical approach, as he interviewed hundreds of ordinary Frenchmen and women about their experience of being in the Resistance. He also published a general history of 20th-century France, under the title La Vie en Bleu (740 pages).

=== Resistance in Vichy France ===
When Resistance in Vichy France was published in 1978 its quality was widely applauded. Joanna Richardson found it "solid and imaginative", Maurice Larkin described it as "stimulating and unpretentious" and John Horne praised its "admirable subtlety". For G. M. Hamburg the book had captured Vichy France in all of its complexity: "Kedward’s study of French idealism and opportunism gives a more complicated, but a more accurate picture of the motivations behind the resistance than is available in other histories". Critics particularly enjoyed Kedward's linking of the history of the distant and recent past. M. R. D. Foot underlined that: "Mr Kedward’s great advantage when he writes about politics is that he understands history. One of his book’s main virtues is that he shows how much people of southern France in those years of defeat and despair were conscious of, and sustained by, the knowledge of previous national catastrophes and of the traditional remedies for them."

This view was reiterated by an anonymous reviewer in The Economist: "he thoroughly understands French history, and is able to show how people in a country in difficulties can come to terms with their present by reflecting on their past". This same reviewer was full of praise for the book's methodology, finding in Kedward: "an exemplar to scholars of how to treat almost intractable material". Using oral history had given considerable vitality to the study in the eyes of the Times Higher Education Supplement, "Kedward brings the period alive as a result of his many interviews with former résistants". Kedward had attempted to allow different voices to emerge but for Maurice Larkin he had been a little bit over-indulgent in accepting the Communist party's stance: "He tries very hard to be fair to everyone – perhaps, some may think, a little too benignly in his account of communist behaviour in 1940–41".

Kedward was given support in France by Henry Rousso who described it in 1982 as a "little known work, full of original ideas". Rousso, although from a French family, had been born in Egypt and lived in New York, so spoke fluent English. The book had to wait over ten years for a French translation. Julian T. Jackson explained the long wait by the fact that at that time the French academic community was much more focused on the study of Vichy which Robert Paxton had revitalised than on reviewing the history of the Resistance. Paxton, he explained, "wrote the right book at the right time, Kedward the right one at the wrong time".

When a French translation was published, Jean-Pierre Azéma wrote a preface for it. Azéma began this by listing all the reasons why the book had not so far been bedtime reading in France. The first was obviously a linguistic one with few French scholars of Azéma's generation showing much inclination to read in English. But there were also reasons related to the subject matter- Resistance in Vichy France was a book limited geographically to the study of the unoccupied zone and chronologically to the years 1940–1942 which most would consider as the nadir of Resistance activity.

Azéma went on to highlight the originality of the book, describing it as "a book of the highest quality which will become a reference". He ended the preface by thanking the publisher for having given the French public access to a truly "pioneering study". A similar baton was taken up by French reviewers once this translation became available. Jean-Pierre Rioux in Le Monde of 20 October 1989 described it as "a work which appeared in 1978 and has become a classic in the eyes of specialists and all praise must go to Champ Vallon for having at last commissioned its translation". He praised its challenge to received ideas and its "remarkable understanding" of historical situations.

=== In Search of the Maquis ===
In the mid-1980s Kedward suffered a heart problem which almost killed him. The research on his next major monograph, which was drawing to a close at that point, was put on hold and it was not until 1993 that In Search of the Maquis came out. Again the reviews were very positive. Douglas Johnson (historian) underlined that it was a "book that is not only remarkably well-documented but also perceptive and moving". The writer Francis Hodgson described the text as a "Maquisard history of the Maquis, and a very fine one".

According to John Simmonds "Kedward has written an extraordinary book, which maintains strong elements missing from much history of the times, such as the role of women in the Resistance". Simmonds underlined the skill with which Kedward conjoined different periods of history, his "ability to link this type of refusal with the revolts of the 18th Century Camisards in the Cévennes and the radicalism of 19th and 20th century rural movements". Sarah Fishman described the book as an "exceptional historical analysis". She praised its "nuanced and rich portrait of life in Vichy France" and underlined that "Kedward’s sensitivity to issues of rhetoric and discourse leads to rich descriptions of the complexities and subtleties of public opinion". For Fishman "Kedward’s work, in sum, is an eloquent and subtle example of the third phase into which historiography is moving. From mythmaking to mythbreaking".

Again the book was well received in France where it was translated more rapidly than his previous monograph under the title A la recherche du Maquis. In Libération on 23 September 1999, Olivier Wieviorka predicted classic status would befall A la recherche du Maquis. Laurent Douzou in his review of the Maquis book for Le Monde of 10 September found it astonishing that a foreign historian should have such an intimate understanding and knowledge of rural France. Perceptively he added: "To pull off such a triumph, without doubt one must love this history, its actors and the countryside in which it was performed".

== Recognition ==
Kedward obtained numerous awards including the Prix Philippe Viannay (2005) for his book A la recherche du maquis. The French government awarded him the title of Chevalier dans l'Ordre des Palmes Académiques in recognition of his services to French history. Some of his former students and colleagues grouped together to put together a festschrift for him. This came out with the publisher Berg in 2005 under the title Vichy, Resistance, Liberation, co-edited by Hanna Diamond and Simon Kitson.

== Bibliography ==
- The Dreyfus Affair: Catalyst for Tensions in French Society, Longman (1965)
- Fascism in Western Europe 1900–45, Blackie and New York University Press (1969)
- The Anarchists: The Men Who Shocked an Era, Macdonald (1970)
  - translated in Dutch as De anarchisten. Onmacht van het geweld (1970)
- Resistance in Vichy France, Oxford University Press (1978)
  - Naissance de la Résistance dans la France de Vichy, Champ Vallon (1989)* Occupied France: Resistance and Collaboration, Blackwell (1985)
- In Search of the Maquis, Oxford University Press (1993)
  - A la recherche du Maquis, Cerf (1999)
- La Vie en Bleu: France and the French since 1900, Penguin (2005)
  - published in the U.S. as France and the French: A Modern History (2005)
- The Pursuit of Reality: The Némirovsky Effect, University of Reading (2008)
- The French Resistance and its Legacy, Bloomsbury (2022)
