= St Giles' Hospital =

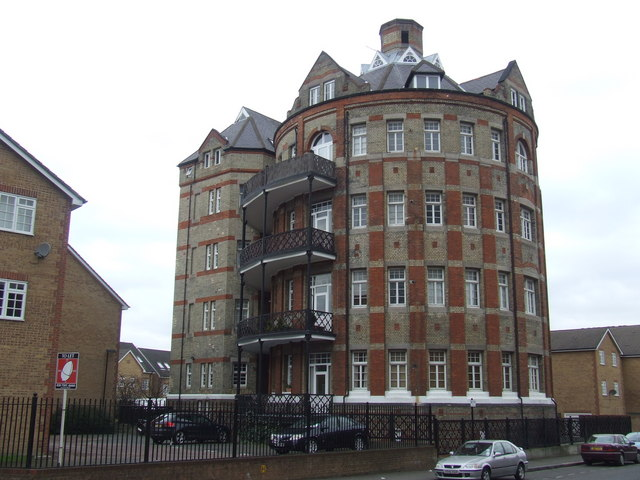
- Circular ward at St Giles' Hospital

- Shown in Southwark

Geography
- Location: Southwark, London, England
- Coordinates: 51.4756°N 0.0835°W

Organisation
- Care system: NHS England
- Type: Teaching

Services
- Emergency department: No

History
- Founded: 1875
- Closed: 1983

Links
- Lists: Hospitals in England

St Giles' Hospital was a hospital located in Camberwell, London.

== History ==
The hospital had its origins in the Camberwell Workhouse Infirmary which was completed in 1875. A large circular tower was added in 1890 and further ward blocks were completed in 1903. It became the Camberwell Parish Infirmary in 1913 and St Giles' Hospital in 1930.

In 1930 St Giles came under the administration of the London County Council as part of the reforms of the Local Government Act 1929. Overseeing the 828 beds was medical superintendent EWG Masterman FRCS MD (Durham) DPH and the Matron was Miss ME Jones ARRC (Associate Royal Red Cross). In the New Years Honours list of 1943 Matron Jones was awarded the MBE (Member of the British Empire).

Nurses' badges

It was hit by a V-1 flying bomb during the Second World War. It joined the National Health Service in 1948 and closed in 1983. The circular tower, which is a grade II listed building, has since been converted for residential use.
