= 1907 Jarrow by-election =

UK parliamentary by-election

- 4 July 1907

| Candidate | Curran | Rose-Innes | Hughes |
| Party | Labour | Conservative | Liberal |
| Popular vote | 4,698 | 3,930 | 3,474 |
| Percentage | 33.0% | 27.6% | 24.4% |
| Candidate | O'Hanlon |
| Party | Irish Parliamentary |
| Popular vote | 2,122 |
| Percentage | 14.9% |
MP before election
Sir Charles Palmer
Liberal
Subsequent MP
Pete Curran
Labour

The 1907 Jarrow by-election was held on 4 July 1907.

== Vacancy ==
The by-election was held due to the death of the incumbent Liberal MP, Charles Palmer.

== Electoral history ==
At the 1906 general election Palmer had had a straight fight with Labour;

Palmer

General election 1906: Jarrow
| Party | Candidate | Votes | % | ±% |
|---|---|---|---|---|
| Liberal | Charles Palmer | 8,047 | 61.2 | |
| Labour Repr. Cmte. | Pete Curran | 5,093 | 38.8 | |
| Majority | | 2,954 | 22.4 | |
| Turnout | | 13,140 | 77.2 | |
| Liberal hold | | Swing | | |

== Candidates ==
The sitting Liberal MP, the 84-year-old Sir Charles Palmer, had announced that he did not intend to stand for Parliament at the next election and the local Liberals had already selected Spencer Leigh Hughes as his replacement. Hughes’ opportunity to get into Parliament came quickly as Sir Charles died on 4 June 1907 thus causing a by-election at which Hughes was adopted as Liberal candidate. Hughes faced, Labour, Conservative and Irish Parliamentary Party opponents.

== Result ==
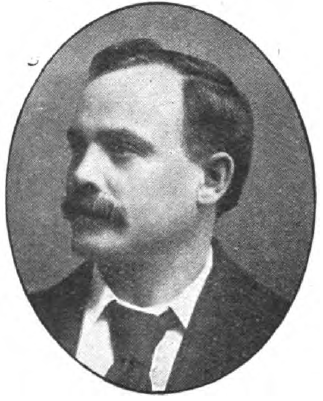
Curran

Jarrow by-election, 1907
| Party | Candidate | Votes | % | ±% |
|---|---|---|---|---|
| Labour | Pete Curran | 4,698 | 33.0 | −5.8 |
| Conservative | Patrick Rose-Innes | 3,930 | 27.6 | New |
| Liberal | Spencer Leigh Hughes | 3,474 | 24.4 | −36.8 |
| Irish Parliamentary | John O'Hanlon | 2,122 | 14.9 | New |
| Majority | | 768 | 5.4 | N/A |
| Turnout | | 14,224 | 82.7 | +5.5 |
| Labour gain from Liberal | | Swing | | |

== Aftermath ==
For Curran, it was a short-lived triumph as he was unseated by another Liberal at the following General Election in January 1910. Rose-Innes did not stand for Parliament again. In 1909 Hughes was the unsuccessful Liberal candidate at the 1909 Bermondsey by-election. The Irish Nationalists never again ran a candidate in Jarrow.

General election January 1910: Jarrow
| Party | Candidate | Votes | % | ±% |
|---|---|---|---|---|
| Liberal | Godfrey Mark Palmer | 4,885 | 34.0 | +9.4 |
| Labour | Pete Curran | 4,818 | 33.5 | +0.4 |
| Conservative | James Kirkley | 4,668 | 32.5 | +4.9 |
| Majority | | 67 | 0.5 | N/A |
| Turnout | | 14,371 | 78.6 | −4.1 |
| Liberal gain from Labour | | Swing | +4.5 | |
