= Alfred Salter =

British politician (1873-1945)

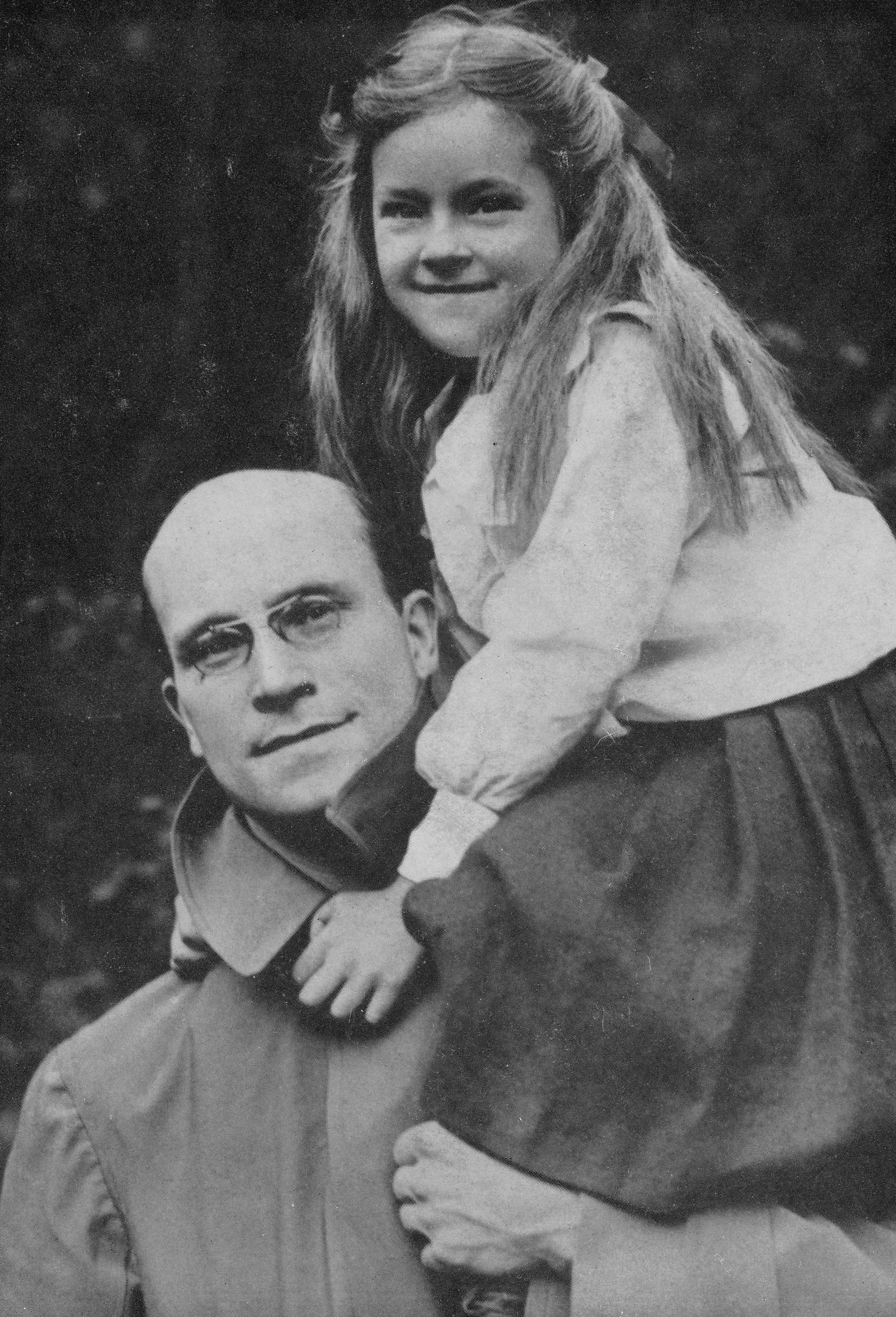
- Alfred Salter and Joyce

Member of Parliament for Bermondsey West
- In office 29 October 1924 – 5 July 1945
- Preceded by: Roderick Kedward
- Succeeded by: Richard Sargood
- In office 15 November 1922 – 6 December 1923
- Preceded by: Harold Glanville
- Succeeded by: Roderick Kedward

Personal details
- Born: 16 June 1873 Greenwich, London, England
- Died: 24 August 1945 (aged 72)
- Party: Labour
- Spouse: Ada Brown (m. 1900; died 1942)
- Children: 1
- Parents: Walter Hookway Salter (father); Elizabeth Tester (mother)
- Education: The John Roan School

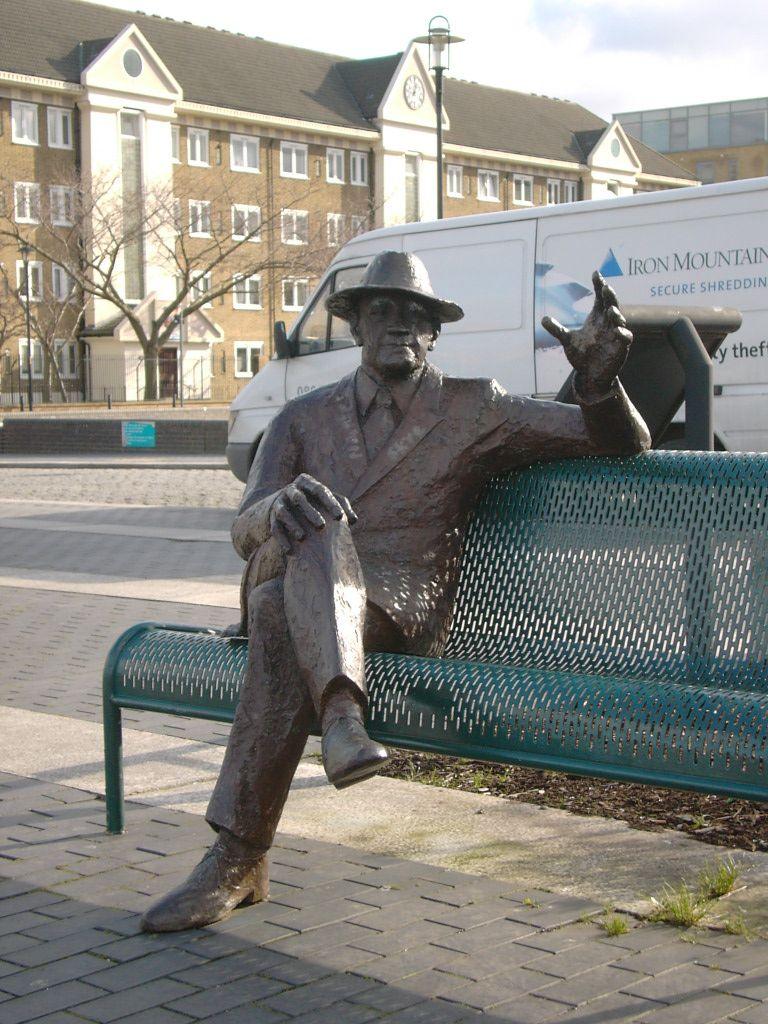
Statue of Salter in Bermondsey

Alfred Salter (16 June 1873 – 24 August 1945) was a British medical practitioner and Labour Party politician.

== Early life ==
Salter was born in Greenwich in 1873, the son of Walter Hookway Salter and Elizabeth Tester. Following education at The John Roan School, Greenwich, he went on to study medicine at Guy's Hospital, London. He qualified in 1896 and in the following year was awarded the Golding-Bird gold medal and scholarship in public health, and the Gull research scholarship in pathology. He was made house physician and resident obstetric physician at Guy's and was appointed as bacteriologist to what later became the Lister Institute of Preventive Medicine.

In 1898 he became a resident at the Methodist Settlement in Bermondsey, an area of south-east London alongside the River Thames, then an area of "poverty that is stark and staring" and some of the most appalling slums in London. In the 19th century Bermondsey specialised in leather but in the 20th century the major sources of employment were the food factories, employing mostly women, and the docks, employing men. Most of the men working in the docks were employed on a contingent daily basis; the casual nature of this work made it difficult to make a decent living. While at the Settlement, which had been established by Rev. John Scott Lidgett, Salter set up mutual health insurance schemes and adult education classes on health matters. In 1900 he married Ada Brown, who shared his political and social views, and in 1902 a daughter was born, Ada Joyce Salter. Joyce died in 1910 after a scarlet fever epidemic swept through the slums. She was their only child.

In the year of his marriage he established his medical practice in Bermondsey, and the couple worked together in trying to alleviate the effects of poverty in the largely working class area. He chose to offer services free to those who could not pay. This work was to lead the establishment of a pioneering comprehensive health service in the area. (See the background to the formation of the NHS.)

== Politics ==
Salter decided that by entering politics he could effect changes to the squalid environment in Bermondsey far more quickly and profoundly than he could outside the political arena. He was elected to Bermondsey Borough Council in 1903, and was also a member of the local board of guardians. In March 1906 he was elected to fill a vacancy on the London County Council, representing the seat of Southwark, Bermondsey as a member of the Progressive Party following the election of the sitting councillor, George Cooper, as the area's Member of Parliament. He was re-elected to the LCC in 1907.

In October 1909 George Cooper MP died. Cooper had been elected as a Liberal Party Member of Parliament (MP), and although Salter had succeeded him on the county council, he had since become aligned with the Independent Labour Party (ILP). On 8 October, Alfred Salter was officially announced as the party's candidate at the by-election. The poll was held on 28 October, and Salter received 1,435 votes, finishing third of the three candidates. Crucially, his intervention probably led to the loss of the seat by the Liberals, with the Conservative candidate John Dumphreys securing a majority of 987 votes.

In March 1910 the triennial election of the London County Council was held. Salter was chosen to defend the Bermondsey seat as a Labour candidate against both the Progressives and the Conservative-backed Municipal Reform Party. He was heavily defeated, coming at the bottom of the poll of five candidates. He contested the same seat in 1913, but was again unsuccessful.

All elections were postponed for the duration of the First World War. When a general election was called in December 1918, the parliamentary constituencies were revised under the Representation of the People Act 1918. Salter was selected as Labour Party candidate for the new Bermondsey West seat, and was described in the following terms by The Times:

"Dr Salter, the Labour candidate, is one of the highly educated idealists who are to be found in the ranks of that party. After a brilliant academic career, he decided to devote himself to work among the poor in Bermondsey, and there he has laboured for many years both as a doctor professionally and as a member of local administrative bodies. Personally, nobody has a word to say against him, but his views are of a very extreme kind. His attitude during the war was that of a pacifist, though he would not, it is said, admit the accuracy of this popular term."

The new constituency was won by the Liberal candidate Harold Glanville, who had been the sitting MP for Bermondsey.

In 1919 municipal elections resumed. In March both Alfred and his wife Ada were Labour Party candidates in the London County Council elections, standing in the neighbouring electoral divisions of Bermondsey West and Rotherhithe. Neither was elected. In November Ada was elected to Bermondsey Borough Council. She held the seat in 1922, and in the same year was elected as the first female mayor of the borough.

== Member of Parliament ==
In the 1922 general election he was again nominated as Labour candidate for Bermondsey West. Salter secured 7,550 votes, a majority of 2,325. He was helped to victory by there being three opposing candidates, with the Anti-Labour vote split between Liberal, National Liberal and Independent Unionist opponents. His wife, as mayor of the borough, was the returning officer who declared him elected. A further general election was held in 1923, and Salter lost the seat in a straight fight to the Rev. Roderick Kedward, the Liberal candidate, in spite of increasing his vote to 8,298. Political instability led to another election in October 1924. Salter was able to overturn the result of the previous year, increasing his vote to 11,578 and unseating Kedward with a majority of 2,902. He was re-elected in the general elections of 1929, 1931, and 1935, but stood down at the 1945 election, when he was in very poor health, and died soon afterwards, aged 72.

== Personal beliefs ==
According to Fenner Brockway, the anti-war activist, Salter in his youth was known as the "Settlement firebrand – militant Republican, militant Socialist, militant Agnostic, militant Teetotaller, militant Pacifist." Alfred Salter was a committed Christian and pacifist, a Quaker from 1900 onwards, and later an active member of the Peace Pledge Union. He was one of the founders of the Socialist Medical Association and a friend of its President Somerville Hastings, with whom he made a trip to the Soviet Union in 1931. Salter and his friend, George Lansbury, attributed the rise of Hitler to the Treaty of Versailles, which imposed crushing reparations on Germany, and to the existence of the colonial empires. In 1936 he advocated the calling of a world economic conference and the creation of a new League of Nations to which the possessions of the British Empire could be transferred. Salter believed appeasement could avert war with Germany, stating in November 1938 that "the average German will withdraw his backing from Hitler if we show willingness to be just". The failure of appeasement and outbreak of World War II left Salter deeply depressed. Noting that his constituency was heavily bombed by the Luftwaffe during the Blitz because of its docks, he opposed the strategic bombing of civilian areas in Germany by the Royal Air Force Bomber Command on moral grounds, one of the few Parliamentarians to do so, along with fellow Labour MP Richard Stokes and Bishop George Bell in the House of Lords,

Salter was a strong supporter of the Temperance Movement, i.e. abstaining from alcohol, at a time when drink was a major problem for working class women dependent on their husband's wages. He also caused controversy when he spoke out against widespread drunkenness in the House of Commons. As a pacifist and a supporter of free speech, he resigned from the Bermondsey Borough Labour Party and the local trades council when they organised a counter-demonstration to prevent the British Union of Fascists from holding a march in the borough. (See the 1936 Battle of Cable Street for context.) He accused the trades council of being "Communist in sympathy and Fascist in methods". It was his contribution on health, however, which has caused his name to be remembered. Though not an elected councillor, he was an Alderman and the leader of the Bermondsey ILP in the 1920s and inspired radical innovations in the local health service, including campaigns for preventative medicine using films and advertising, and the founding in 1936 of one of Britain's first multi-purpose health centres. Taken together with his practice of free treatment for the poorest, he is credited with creating, locally, an 'NHS before the NHS'.

== Memorials to Alfred Salter ==
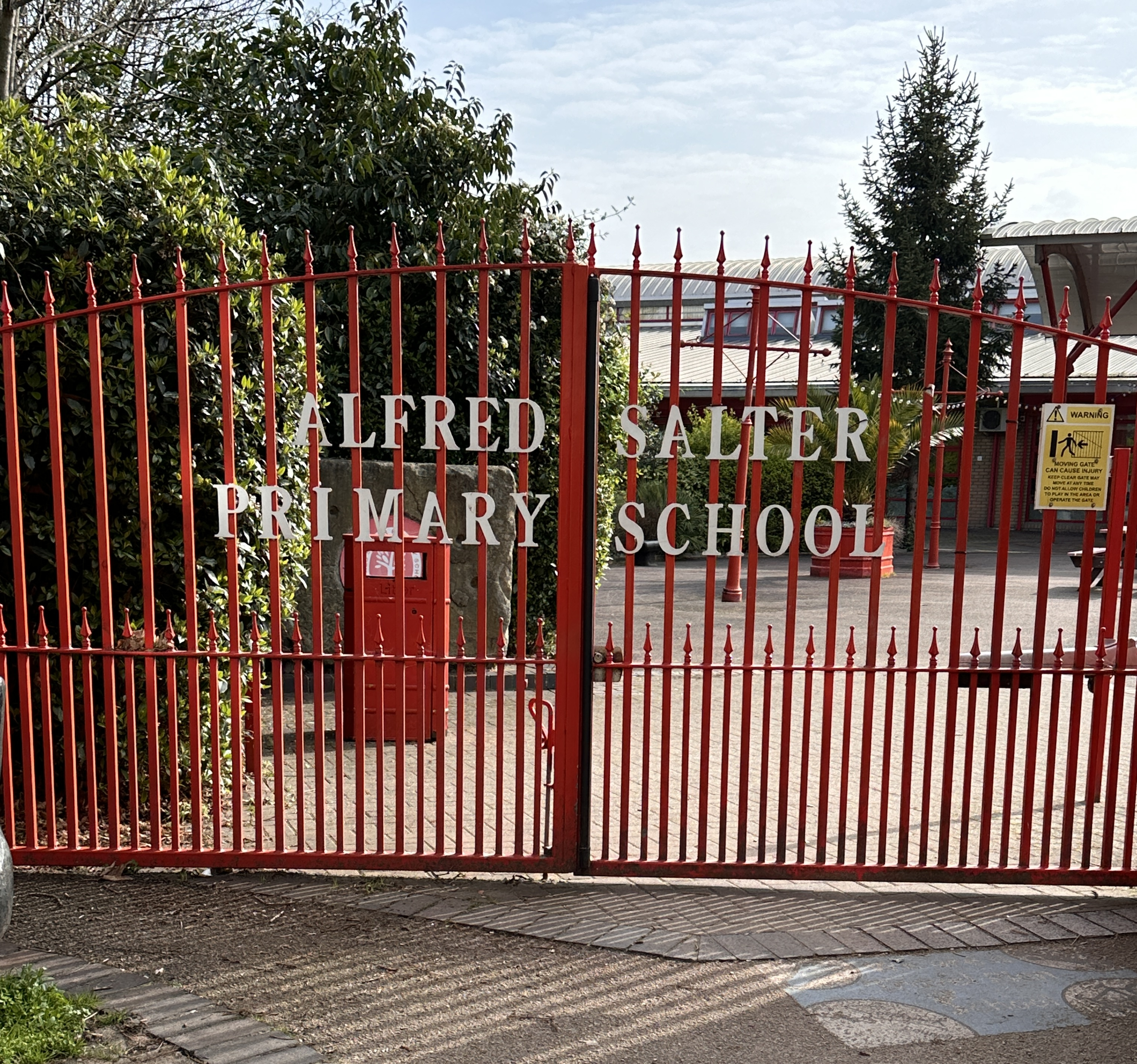
Alfred Salter Primary School

in 1990 a plaque to mark Dr Salter's birthplace was unveiled in Greenwich. The Alfred Salter Primary School was opened in 1995 to meet the growing demand for school places in Rotherhithe, due to the redevelopment of the old Surrey Docks. The Alfred Salter Bridge is a footbridge leading off Watermans Lane, between Stave Hill and Redriff Road, near Greenland Dock as part of the Russia Dock Woodland. In 2002 a plaque to Alfred Salter, also mentioning Ada, was unveiled at Bermondsey tube station.

In 1991 a statue ensemble of Alfred and his daughter, Joyce, entitled Dr Salter's Daydream, sculpted by Diane Gorvin, was unveiled on the river-front. The statue of Alfred was stolen, presumably for the value of its bronze, in November 2011. The Salter Statues Campaign group raised £60,000, which Southwark Council matched, to pay for replacement statues, including Ada this time, and these were unveiled on 30 November 2014.

A Salter Memorial Lecture is promoted by the Quaker Socialist Society each year as a fringe event at the Britain Yearly Meeting of the Religious Society of Friends (Quakers).

== Bibliography ==
- Brockway, Archibald Fenner (1949). Bermondsey Story: The Life of Alfred Salter. Allen & Unwin.
- Howell, David (23 September 2004). "Salter, Alfred". Oxford Dictionary of National Biography. doi:10.1093/ref:odnb/50376.
- Taylor, Graham (1 January 2016). Ada Salter: Pioneer of Ethical Socialism. Lawrence & Wishart. ISBN 978-1910448014.
- White, Jerry (3 January 2008). London in the Twentieth Century. Vintage Books. ISBN 978-1845951269.

Parliament of the United Kingdom
Preceded by Harold James Glanville	Member of Parliament for Bermondsey West; 1922–1923	Succeeded by Roderick Kedward
Preceded by Roderick Kedward	Member of Parliament for Bermondsey West; 1924–1945	Succeeded by Richard Sargood
