= George Cooper (Bermondsey MP) =

British politician

George Cooper

George Joseph Cooper (c. 1844 – 7 October 1909) was a British Liberal Party politician in London.

He qualified as a medical doctor in 1867 and became a GP with a house and dispensary at the corner of Reverdy Road and Southwark Park Road in Bermondsey, living there from 1881 with his wife, eight children, and a servant.

When the London County Council (LCC) was created in 1889, Cooper was elected as a councillor for Bermondsey, standing for the Progressive Party, the municipal organisation of the Liberals. He was re-elected five times, holding the seat at the 1904 elections.

At the 1906 general election he was elected as the member of parliament (MP) for Bermondsey, defeating the sitting Conservative MP Henry Cust. He then resigned from the LCC. Whilst an MP he voted in favour of the 1908 Women's Enfranchisement Bill.

He died in 1909, aged 65. According to his son, he was killed by overwork relating to the People's Budget. He was buried in Charlton Cemetery on 12 October, where the funeral service was so heavily attended that the chapel could accommodate only half of those present.

At the resulting by-election for his seat, Alfred Salter, who had succeeded Cooper on the LCC, stood as an Independent Labour Party candidate. The local Liberal organisation in the constituency had been heavily dependent on Cooper and his son, who had run the 1906 campaign. Weakened by his absence, and with the non-Conservative vote split, the Conservative candidate won the seat. However, the Liberals regained it within months, at the general election in January 1910.

Parliament of the United Kingdom
Preceded by Henry Cust	Member of Parliament for Bermondsey; 1906 – 1909	Succeeded by John Dumphreys
