= John Dumphreys =

British Conservative politician (1844–1925)

John Molesworth Thomas Dumphreys

Member of Parliament for Bermondsey
- In office 1909–1910

Personal details
- Born: Bermondsey, London 24 December 1844
- Died: 18 December 1925 (aged 80) Manor Park, Essex

John Molesworth Thomas Dumphreys (24 December 1844 – 18 December 1925) was a British Conservative politician. He was elected Member of Parliament for Bermondsey in a 1909 by-election, but weeks later lost the seat to the Liberals at the January 1910 general election.

Dumphreys was born in Bermondsey in 1844. Of humble origins, he worked as a journeyman leather dresser. He was active in local politics for most of his adult life, being elected to the Borough Council, the School Board and County Council. He stood in Birmingham West in 1885, against Joseph Chamberlain, on a Fair Trade platform. He was unusual in being a "Conservative working man." In 1907, he became Mayor of Bermondsey. He was a supporter of Tariff Reform.

Aged almost 65, he was selected as Conservative candidate for the by-election caused by the death of the sitting Liberal MP George Joseph Cooper, because Assheton Pownall, the Conservative prospective candidate for the expected general election, was out of the country. The seat had alternated between Liberal and Conservative in recent elections, although the Liberals had secured a convincing victory in 1906.

Dumphreys was critical of the Liberal government's failure to act on the recommendation of the Poor Law Commission, which had been initiated by the previous Conservative government. In particular, he pressed for wholesale reform of the workhouse system, for better treatment of the deserving poor, and removal of the taint of pauper from children. "For every child a chance" was his philosophy.

After a good-natured contest, Dumphreys was elected on 28 October 1909 with a majority of 987 votes over the Liberal candidate, Mr. Spencer Leigh Hughes, with the Labour candidate, Dr. Alfred Salter, securing 16% of the vote. However, polling day had been marred by two women attacking polling stations, smashing bottles containing corrosive liquid over ballot boxes, in an attempt to destroy votes. A presiding officer, Mr. Thornley, was badly injured in one of these attacks, and a Liberal agent suffered a severe burn to the neck. The count was delayed while ballot papers were carefully examined, but it was determined that only two votes had been destroyed.

Dumphreys had little time to enjoy his victory, or to make much impact in the House of Commons. Parliament was dissolved in December 1909, and in the ensuing general election, he was defeated by 969 votes with the new Liberal candidate Harold Glanville being the only other candidate. Dumphreys thereby became one of the shortest-serving MPs in history. He tried to regain the seat in the December 1910 general election, but was defeated by a wider margin, and never stood for Parliament again.

Dumphreys was the last Conservative MP for Bermondsey. His Labour opponent in the by-election, Dr. Alfred Salter eventually won the seat for Labour in 1922, and the seat became a Labour Party stronghold, until another by-election in 1983, when another Liberal candidate by the name of "Mr. S. Hughes" scored a notable victory.

Dumphreys died at Manor Park, Essex (now Greater London), in 1925, aged 80.

== See also ==
- List of United Kingdom MPs with the shortest service
- 1983 Bermondsey by-election

Parliament of the United Kingdom
Preceded by George Joseph Cooper	Member of Parliament for Bermondsey; 1909 – January 1910	Succeeded by Harold James Glanville
