= Bermondsey (UK Parliament constituency) =

Parliamentary constituency in the United Kingdom, 1950–1983

- Former borough constituency for the House of Commons
- Boundary of Bermondsey in Greater London for the February 1974 general election

1885–1918
- Seats: one
- Created from: Southwark
- Replaced by: Bermondsey West and Rotherhithe

1950–1983
- Seats: one
- Created from: Bermondsey West and Rotherhithe
- Replaced by: Southwark and Bermondsey

Bermondsey was a borough constituency centred on the Bermondsey district of South London, England. It returned one Member of Parliament (MP) to the House of Commons of the Parliament of the United Kingdom. Elections were held using the first-past-the-post voting system.

The constituency was created for the 1885 general election and abolished for the 1918 general election, when almost all its territory was represented by the new Bermondsey West and a very small amount going into the existing Rotherhithe constituency.

A new Bermondsey constituency was created for the 1950 general election including Rotherhithe, was and abolished for the 1983 election, when it was largely replaced by the new Southwark and Bermondsey constituency.

== History ==
The 1983 by-election was one of the most bitterly contested by-elections in the United Kingdom as it involved Bob Mellish, the retired Labour MP, running a highly personal and homophobic campaign against the Labour candidate, Peter Tatchell. The result was the election of Simon Hughes as a Liberal in a former Labour stronghold.

== Boundaries ==
Map of boundaries 1974–1983

Dates	Local authority	Maps	Wards
1885–1918	Metropolitan Borough of Bermondsey (after 1900)		
1950–1974	Metropolitan Borough of Bermondsey (before 1965); London Borough of Southwark (after 1965)		Metropolitan Borough of Bermondsey
1974–1983	London Borough of Southwark		Abbey, Bricklayers, Browning, Cathedral, Chaucer, Dockyard, Riverside, and Rotherhithe.

== Members of Parliament ==
=== MPs 1885–1918 ===
Election	Member	Party	Notes
1885	Thorold Rogers	Liberal	Member for Southwark (1880–1885)
1886	Alfred Lafone	Conservative	
1892	Reuben Barrow	Liberal	
1895	Alfred Lafone	Conservative	
1900	Henry Cust	Conservative	
1906	George Cooper	Liberal	Died in office
1909 by-election	John Dumphreys	Conservative	
1910	Harold Glanville	Liberal	Contested Bermondsey West following redistribution
1918	Constituency abolished: see Rotherhithe and Bermondsey West		

=== MPs 1950–1983 ===
Election	Member	Party	Notes
1950	Bob Mellish	Labour	Labour Chief Whip 1969–1976. Resigned November 1982
1983 by-election	Simon Hughes	Liberal	Contested Southwark and Bermondsey following redistribution
1983	constituency abolished: see Southwark and Bermondsey		

== Election results ==
=== Elections in the 1880s ===
General election 1885: Bermondsey
Party	Candidate	Votes	%
Liberal	Thorold Rogers	3,469	50.6
Conservative	Alfred Lafone	3,386	49.4
Majority		83	1.2
Turnout		6,855	72.7
Registered electors		9,433	
Liberal win (new seat)			

General election 1886: Bermondsey
Party	Candidate	Votes	%	±%
Conservative	Alfred Lafone	3,356	52.8	+3.4
Liberal	Thorold Rogers	2,998	47.2	−3.4
Majority		358	5.6	N/A
Turnout		6,354	67.4	−5.3
Registered electors		9,433		
Conservative gain from Liberal		Swing	+3.4	

=== Elections in the 1890s ===
General election 1892: Bermondsey
Party	Candidate	Votes	%	±%
Liberal	Reuben Barrow	4,390	54.1	+6.9
Conservative	Alfred Lafone	3,732	45.9	−6.9
Majority		658	8.2	N/A
Turnout		8,122	75.9	+8.5
Registered electors		10,702		
Liberal gain from Conservative		Swing	+6.9	

General election 1895: Bermondsey
Party	Candidate	Votes	%	±%
Conservative	Alfred Lafone	4,182	52.2	+6.3
Liberal	Reuben Barrow	3,822	47.8	−6.3
Majority		360	4.5	N/A
Turnout		8,004	73.2	−2.7
Registered electors		10,935		
Conservative gain from Liberal		Swing	+6.3	

=== Elections in the 1900s ===
General election 1900: Bermondsey
Party	Candidate	Votes	%	±%
Conservative	Henry Cust	4,017	51.9	−0.3
Liberal	John Benn	3,717	48.1	+0.3
Majority		300	3.8	−0.6
Turnout		7,734	69.0	−4.2
Registered electors		11,211		
Conservative hold		Swing	−0.3	

George Cooper

General election January 1906: Bermondsey
Party	Candidate	Votes	%	±%
Liberal	George Cooper	4,775	61.3	+13.2
Conservative	Henry Cust	3,016	38.7	−13.2
Majority		1,759	22.6	N/A
Turnout		7,791	73.4	+4.4
Registered electors		10,619		
Liberal gain from Conservative		Swing	+13.2	

Spencer Hughes

1909 Bermondsey by-election
Party	Candidate	Votes	%	±%
Conservative	John Dumphreys	4,278	47.5	+8.8
Liberal	Spencer Leigh Hughes	3,291	36.6	−24.7
Labour	Alfred Salter	1,435	15.9	New
Majority		987	10.9	N/A
Turnout		9,004	73.6	+0.2
Registered electors		12,233		
Conservative gain from Liberal		Swing	+16.8	

=== Elections in the 1910s ===
Harold Glanville

General election January 1910: Bermondsey
Party	Candidate	Votes	%	±%
Liberal	Harold Glanville	5,477	54.9	−6.4
Conservative	John Dumphreys	4,508	45.1	+6.4
Majority		969	9.8	−12.9
Turnout		9,985	82.4	+9.1
Registered electors		12,115		
Liberal hold		Swing	−6.4	

General election December 1910: Bermondsey
Party	Candidate	Votes	%	±%
Liberal	Harold Glanville	4,911	57.1	+2.2
Conservative	John Dumphreys	3,695	42.9	−2.2
Majority		1,216	14.2	+4.4
Turnout		8,606	71.0	−11.4
Registered electors		12,115		
Liberal hold		Swing	+2.2	

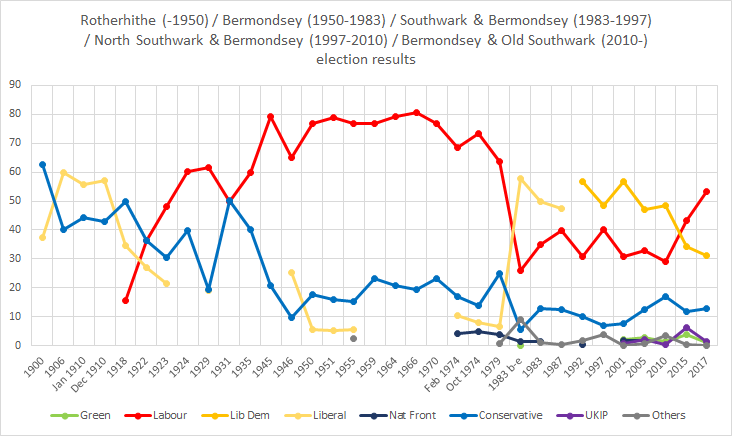
Bermondsey historical election results

=== Elections in the 1950s ===
General election 1950: Bermondsey
Party	Candidate	Votes	%
Labour	Bob Mellish	26,018	76.9
Conservative	F Warwick	5,964	17.6
Liberal	Bridget Talbot	1,852	5.5
Majority		20,054	59.3
Turnout		33,834	79.7
Registered electors		42,467	
Labour win (new seat)			

General election 1951: Bermondsey
Party	Candidate	Votes	%	±%
Labour	Bob Mellish	26,267	78.9	+2.0
Conservative	Ralph Manders	5,265	15.8	–1.8
Liberal	Harry Wilson	1,779	5.3	–0.1
Majority		21,002	63.0	+3.8
Turnout		33,311	78.2	–1.5
Registered electors		42,587		
Labour hold		Swing	+1.9	

General election 1955: Bermondsey
Party	Candidate	Votes	%	±%
Labour	Bob Mellish	21,709	76.7	–2.1
Conservative	Catherine Orr-Ewing	4,309	15.2	–0.6
Liberal	Harry Wilson	1,554	5.49	+0.2
Ind. Labour Party	H Birkett	715	2.5	New
Majority		17,400	61.5	–1.5
Turnout		28,287	69.5	−8.7
Registered electors		40,695		
Labour hold		Swing	–0.8	

General election 1959: Bermondsey
Party	Candidate	Votes	%	±%
Labour	Bob Mellish	20,528	76.8	+0.1
Conservative	Kenneth Payne	6,187	23.2	+7.9
Majority		14,341	53.7	–7.8
Turnout		27,715	70.4	+0.9
Registered electors		37,921		
Labour hold		Swing	–3.9	

=== Elections in the 1960s ===
General election 1964: Bermondsey
Party	Candidate	Votes	%	±%
Labour	Bob Mellish	17,481	79.3	+2.4
Conservative	Jeremy Porter	4,568	20.7	–2.4
Majority		12,913	58.6	+4.9
Turnout		22,049	63.3	–7.2
Registered electors		34,845		
Labour hold		Swing	+2.4	

General election 1966: Bermondsey
Party	Candidate	Votes	%	±%
Labour	Bob Mellish	16,605	80.6	+1.3
Conservative	Jeremy Porter	3,990	19.4	–1.3
Majority		12,615	61.2	+2.7
Turnout		20,095	60.91	–2.4
Registered electors		33,811		
Labour hold		Swing	+1.3	

=== Elections in the 1970s ===
General election 1970: Bermondsey
Party	Candidate	Votes	%	±%
Labour	Bob Mellish	13,908	76.9	–3.7
Conservative	George Nicholson	4,172	23.1	+3.7
Majority		9,736	53.9	–7.4
Turnout		18,090	52.9	–8.0
Registered electors		34,166		
Labour hold		Swing	+3.7	

1970 notional result
Party	Vote	%
Labour	24,700	73.3
Conservative	9,000	26.7
Turnout	33,700	50.4
Electorate	66,835	

General election February 1974: Bermondsey
Party	Candidate	Votes	%	±%
Labour	Bob Mellish	24,847	68.6	–4.7
Conservative	Howard Flight	6,126	16.9	–9.8
Liberal	Chris Hewittson	3,751	10.4	New
National Front	G Davey	1,485	4.1	New
Majority		18,721	51.7	+5.1
Turnout		32,706	65.9	+15.5
Registered electors		54,904		
Labour hold		Swing	+2.6	

General election October 1974: Bermondsey
Party	Candidate	Votes	%	±%
Labour	Bob Mellish	22,875	73.4	+4.8
Conservative	Howard Flight	4,294	13.8	–3.1
Liberal	Thomas Taylor	2,520	8.1	–2.3
National Front	G Davey	1,488	4.8	+0.7
Majority		18,581	59.6	+7.9
Turnout		31,177	56.4	–9.5
Registered electors		55,254		
Labour hold		Swing	+3.9	

General election 1979: Bermondsey
Party	Candidate	Votes	%	±%
Labour	Bob Mellish	19,338	63.6	–9.8
Conservative	Alexander Duma	7,582	24.9	+11.2
Liberal	Thomas Taylor	2,072	6.8	–1.3
National Front	James Sneath	1,175	3.9	–0.9
Workers Revolutionary	Anthony Moore	239	0.8	New
Majority		11,756	38.7	−20.9
Turnout		30,406	59.3	+2.9
Registered electors		51,246		
Labour hold		Swing	–10.5	

=== Elections in the 1980s ===
1983 Bermondsey by-election
Party	Candidate	Votes	%	±%
Liberal	Simon Hughes	17,017	57.7	+50.9
Labour	Peter Tatchell	7,698	26.1	−37.5
Real Bermondsey Labour	John O'Grady	2,243	7.6	New
Conservative	Robert Hughes	1,631	5.5	−19.4
National Front	James Sneath	426	1.4	−2.4
Monster Raving Loony	David Sutch	97	0.3	New
Independent Patriot	Jane Birdwood	69	0.2	New
New Britain	Michael Keulemans	62	0.2	New
Independent Labour	Barry Giddings	50	0.2	New
Communist	Robert Gordon	50	0.2	New
Ecology	George Hannah	45	0.2	New
Revolutionary Communist	Fran Eden	38	0.1	New
National Labour Party	Ann King	25	0.1	New
United Democratic Party	Alan Baker	15	0.1	New
Anti-Common Market Free Trade Party	David Wedgwood	15	0.1	New
Systems Designer	Esmond Bevan	8	0.0	New
Majority		9,319	31.6	N/A
Turnout		29,489	57.7	−1.6
Registered electors		51,096		
Liberal gain from Labour		Swing	+44.2	

Note: Esmond Bevan made a mistake and inserted his occupation rather than politics in the nomination paper. He was an Independent Labour candidate.

== Sources ==
- Richard Kimber's Political Science Resources: UK General Elections since 1832
