= Hubert Carr-Gomm =

British politician and publisher (1877–1939)

Hubert Carr-Gomm MP
- Hubert Carr-Gomm in 1919

Member of Parliament for Rotherhithe
- In office 1906 – 25 November 1918
- Preceded by: John Macdona
- Succeeded by: John Lort-Williams

Parliamentary Private Secretary to the Prime Minister
- In office 1906–1908
- Prime Minister: Henry Campbell-Bannerman
- Preceded by: position established
- Succeeded by: Geoffrey Howard

Personal details
- Born: Hubert William Culling Carr-Gomm; 20 June 1877 India
- Died: 21 January 1939 (aged 61) Tenerife
- Party: Liberal
- Spouse(s): Kathleen Rome (m. 1906–1913, divorce); Eleanor Russell (m. 1916)
- Education: Eton College
- Alma mater: Oriel College, Oxford
- Occupation: Publisher

Military service
- Allegiance: United Kingdom
- Branch/service: British Army
- Years of service: 1898–1907 and 1914–1918
- Rank: Captain
- Unit: Volunteer Battalion of the Queen's Royal Regiment (West Surrey); 2/22nd Battalion, The London Regiment (The Queen's)
- Battles/wars: First World War

Hubert William Culling Carr-Gomm (20 June 1877 – 21 January 1939) was a British Liberal politician and publisher.

== Early life and family ==
Carr-Gomm's family came from Farnham Royal in Buckinghamshire but his father, Francis Culling Carr (1834–1919) was a member of the Indian Civil Service and District Judge of Tinnevelly so Hubert was born in India. In the year that he was born, his mother, Emily Blanche Carr, was bequeathed by her aunt, Lady Elizabeth Ann Gomm (1807-1877), all the estates of her late husband, Field Marshal Sir William Maynard Gomm (1784-1875), on the proviso that the family assumed the name of Gomm in addition to Carr. Upon the death of his mother in 1909 he inherited these estates.

Carr-Gomm was educated at Eton and Oriel College, Oxford where he graduated with an MA in Modern History in 1900. Between 1898 and 1907 he served in the Volunteer Battalion of the Queen's Royal Regiment (West Surrey). In 1909 he was appointed a Justice of the Peace for Buckinghamshire. In 1906 he married Kathleen Rome. This marriage ended in divorce in 1913 because of his wife's adultery with Eliot Crawshay-Williams, Liberal MP for Leicester, who was married with two children. It was a considerable scandal; according to the poet and writer Lucy Masterman, the wife of another Liberal MP, Charles Masterman, Carr-Gomm and Crawshay-Williams had been friends at school, college and in politics. It ruined Crawshay-Williams' political career. Carr-Gomm was remarried in 1916 to Eleanor Russell, the daughter of a barrister of the Inner Temple.

== Politics ==
Carr-Gomm was for a time Secretary of the London Liberal Federation and in the 1906 general election he was elected Liberal MP for Rotherhithe. He held the seat until 1918. From 1906 to 1908 he was Assistant Private Secretary to Liberal Prime Minister Sir Henry Campbell-Bannerman. At the 1918 general election Carr-Gomm was again adopted by the Rotherhithe Liberals but was not one of those candidates favoured with the government coupon. This was instead bestowed on his Conservative opponent John Rolleston Lort-Williams who was successfully returned. Carr-Gomm fought Rotherhithe once more in 1922 but again lost to Lort-Williams. In the 1923 general election he switched to being Liberal candidate for Paddington South but lost to the sitting Unionist MP, Douglas King.

Carr-Gomm continued to take an interest in political questions after leaving Parliament. In 1922 he wrote to The Times, perhaps unsurprisingly condemning the then David Lloyd George-led government as being a coalition around one man or one set of men rather than around established parties and ideas. In 1936 he privately published a pamphlet calling for a system of proportional representation to be used in municipal elections in London where local government wards were ideal for its introduction.

== Military service and publishing ==
In the Great War, Carr-Gomm served in France and Salonika as a Captain in the 2/22nd Battalion, The London Regiment (The Queen's). After landing in Salonika in 1917, Carr-Gomm was appointed to command the Second Entrenching Battalion. In 1921, the publisher John Lane who had been the co-founder of the imprint Bodley Head set up a successor company and Carr-Gomm became one of the directors.

== Death and papers ==
In later life Carr-Gomm and his second wife lived at Tile House, Seaford, East Sussex. While travelling in the Canary Islands he contracted pneumonia and died on 21 January 1939 in Tenerife, aged 61. A small collection of photo-copied papers consisting of recollections of Parliament, three letters from Winston Churchill and a note by Carr-Gomm on his father and the treatment of the Indians by the rubber companies in Putumayo, Peru are deposited in the archive of the London School of Economic and Political Science.

== See also ==
- List of Old Etonians born in the 19th century

Parliament of the United Kingdom
| Preceded by John Macdona | Member of Parliament for Rotherhithe; 1906 – 1918 | Succeeded by John Lort-Williams |
| Preceded by Office established | Parliamentary Private Secretary to the Prime Minister; 1906–1908 | Succeeded by Geoffrey Howard |
