= Greenwich Cemetery =

Cemetery in Greenwich, England

Coordinates: 51.4697°N 0.0541°E

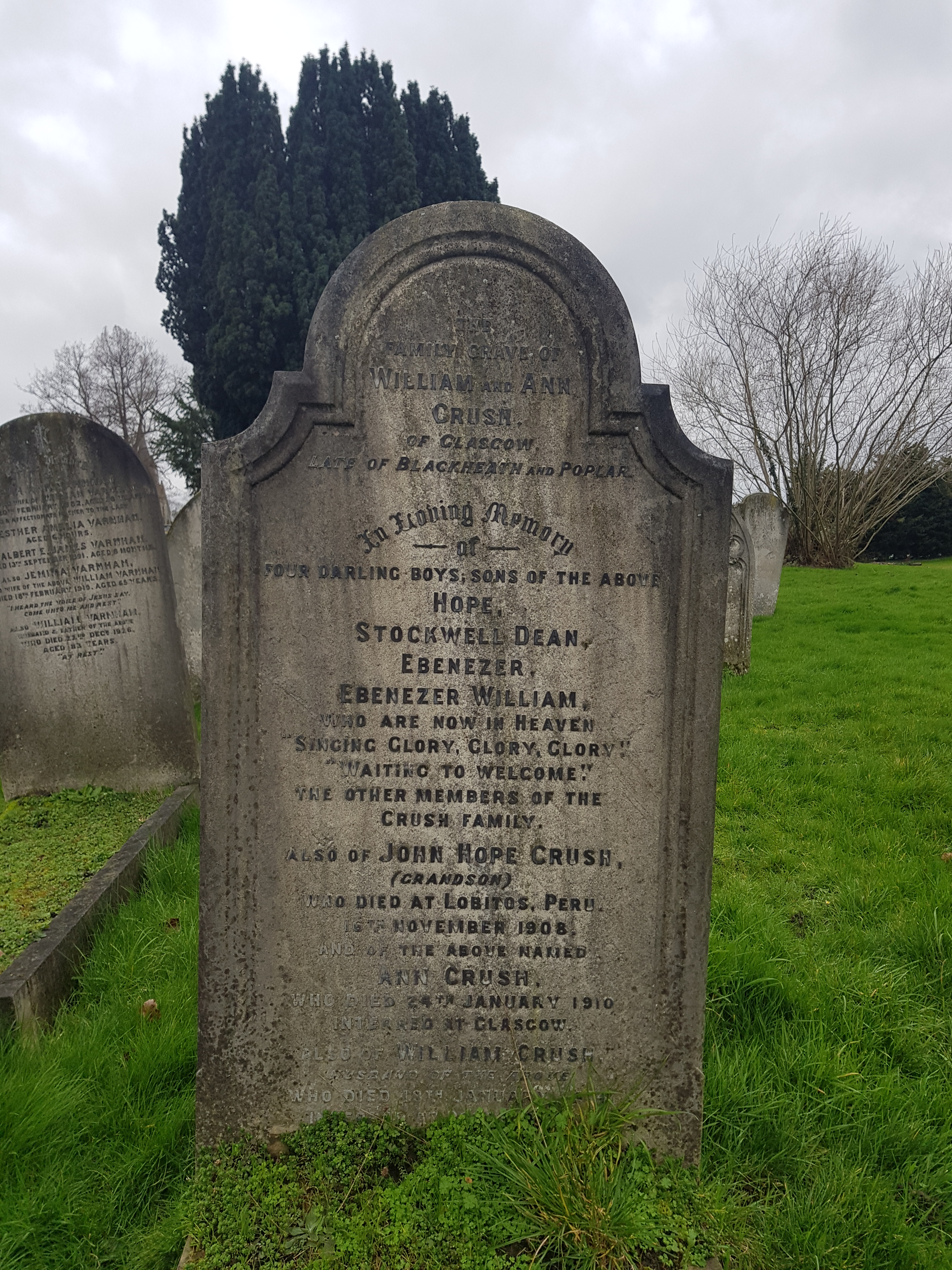
Headstone at the cemetery in 2020

Greenwich Cemetery (also known as Shooters Hill Cemetery) is a cemetery in the Royal Borough of Greenwich in southeast London. It is situated on the southwestern slopes of Shooter's Hill, on the western side of the A205 South Circular, Well Hall Road, approximately halfway between Woolwich, to the north, and Eltham, to the south.

The cemetery was established in 1856 by Greenwich Burial Board, has two "lumpish" Gothic chapels, and a 1920s entrance lodge. Its hillside position gives views towards Crystal Palace and the City of London. Due to its proximity to the Royal Military Academy, Royal Arsenal, the Royal Herbert Military Hospital and other military establishments, numerous army personnel are buried in the cemetery.

== Memorials ==
Greenwich Cemetery contains 558 World War I Commonwealth service war grave burials. Over half are scattered throughout the cemetery, but 263 form a large war graves plot known as 'Heroes' Corner', where two curved screen walls bear the names of casualties buried both in the plot and in unmarked graves in the cemetery.

An adjoining World War II plot contains 75 graves; in total, the cemetery contains 124 Second World War burials, 3 of which are unidentified British soldiers, and 30 Norwegian service graves. Other memorials include:

- Wilberforce Eaves (1867–1920) – Australian tennis player, finalist at Wimbledon Championships, died serving as Captain Royal Army Medical Corps.
- Sir Charles Hamilton (1845–1928) – businessman and MP for Rotherhithe
- Lieutenant-General Sir Arthur Holland (1862–1927), Commandant of the Royal Military Academy, died MP for Northampton
- Surgeon General James Jameson (1837–1904) – Director General of the Army Medical Services in the Boer War and the Commander of the British Ambulance Division in the Franco-Prussian War.
- Nikolay Ogarev (a.k.a. Nicholas Ogareff; 1813–1877) – exiled Russian revolutionary (in 1966, his remains were exhumed and cremated, and his ashes were taken to Russia by two members of the Soviet Writers’ Union)
- Perceval M. Parsons (1819–1892), English engineer and inventor
- Sir William Poland (1797–1884)
- Christopher Rowland (1929–1967) – MP for Meriden
- Sir Andrew Scott (1857–1939)
- Captain Walter Napleton Stone VC (1891–1917) The headstone is a cenotaph: his actual grave in France was never found and he is officially commemorated on the Cambrai Memorial to the Missing.
