= Dora West =

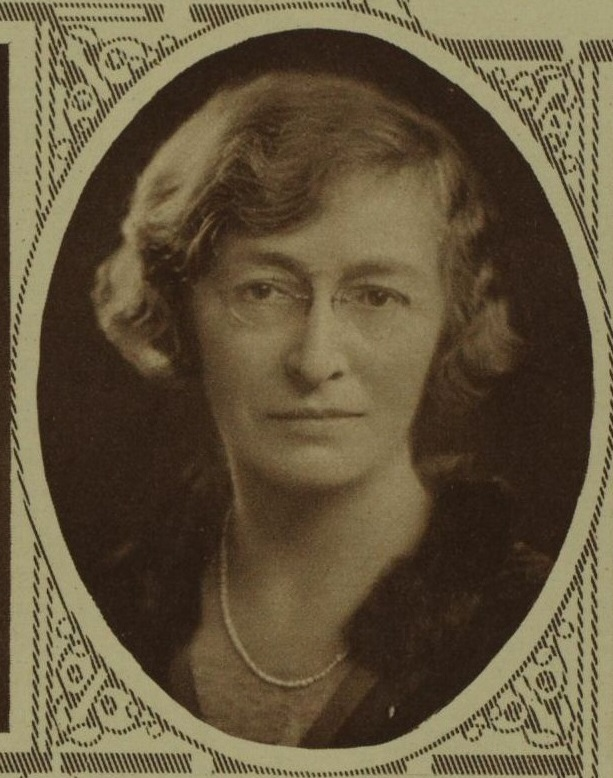
- Dora West
- Born: Holbeach
- Occupation: British politician

Dora West (1883–1962) O.B.E., was a British Liberal Party politician and one of the founders of the League of Nations Union.

== Background ==
She was born in Holbeach St Marks, Lincolnshire, a daughter of Alderman William Henry West and Mary Elizabeth Peck. She was a member of a well-known agricultural family of the Fen district. In 1916 she was involved in recruiting work. She lectured in the West Indies, Central America and West Africa.

== Political career ==
Despite being from a Conservative family, in 1918 she became secretary to William Henry Williams, the Liberal candidate for Bedwelty. She was the founding Secretary of the League of Nations Union serving from 1918 to 1919. The League of Nations Union (LNU) was an organisation formed in October 1918 in the United Kingdom to promote international justice, collective security and a permanent peace between nations based upon the ideals of the League of Nations. The League of Nations was established by the Great Powers as part of the Paris Peace Treaties, the international settlement that followed the First World War. She became the league's first Secretary.

From 1920 to 1921 West acted as private secretary to Charles McCurdy, the Food Controller. The Minister of Food Control was a British government ministerial post separated from that of the Minister of Agriculture. In 1920, "Miss Dora West. Assistant Private Secretary to Parliamentary Secretary, Ministry of Food" was appointed an Officer of the Order of the British Empire. She followed McCurdy when he was appointed National Liberal Chief Whip in 1921; she was Chief Secretary of the Whip's Office. She continued to work for him until the post was wound up in 1922. In 1924 she became active as a speaker for the Liberal Party.

At the 1929 United Kingdom general election she contested, as a Liberal Party candidate, Rotherhithe in South East London. Rotherhithe was not a promising seat for the Liberals but she managed to poll nearly a fifth of the vote;

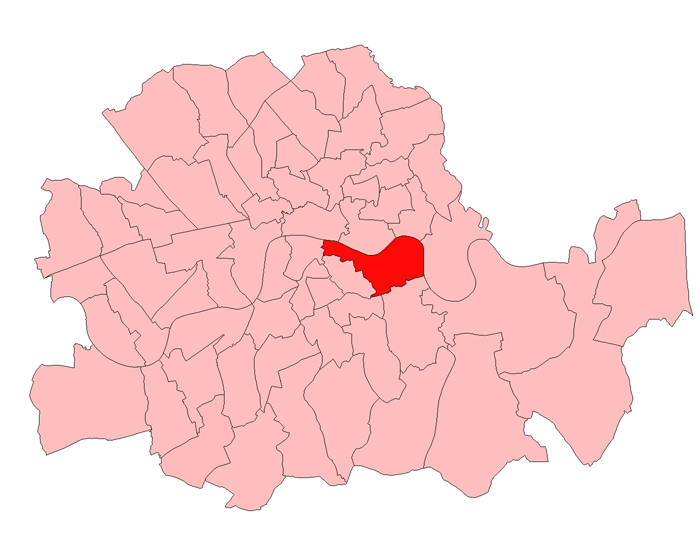
Rotherhithe in the County of London showing boundaries used in 1929

General Election 30 May 1929: Bermondsey, Rotherhithe Electorate
Party	Candidate	Votes	%	±%
Labour	Benjamin Smith	14,664	61.6	
Conservative	Joseph Gurney Braithwaite	4,594	19.3	
Liberal	Miss Dora West	4,556	19.1	n/a
Majority		10,070	42.3	
Turnout		36,133	65.9	
Labour hold		Swing		

After the elections, she returned to her travels, in 1930 visiting Australia and New Zealand. She appears to have spent some time living in New Zealand but had returned to London by the beginning of 1934. In 1962 she died at Fordwich near Canterbury, aged 79.
