= Sir Charles Hamilton, 1st Baronet =

British politician and businessman (1845–1928)

Sir Charles Edward James Louis William John Hamilton, 1st Baronet (28 May 1845 – 15 Nov 1928) was an English businessman and Conservative politician.

Hamilton was the son of John Hamilton of Liverpool and his wife Jessy Kemble. He was a Director of the North Wales Taper Co. and of McCorquodale & Co. He was a member of Liverpool Corporation for nine years and was Lieutenant-Colonel of the 8th Lancashire Rifle Volunteers. He retired from the volunteers in 1881 with permission to retain his rank. He was a J.P. for Lancashire and Liverpool City.

Hamilton was elected Member of Parliament (MP) for Rotherhithe in 1885. He held the seat until he stood down at the 1892 general election, when he was created Baronet of Cadogan Square on 21 November 1892. He was appointed High Sheriff of Cambridgeshire and Huntingdonshire in 1906.

Escutcheon of the Hamilton baronets of Cadogan Square

Hamilton lived at Mayfield, Shooter's Hill, Kent. He died at the age of 83 when the baronetcy became extinct.

Hamilton married Mary McCorquodale in 1876, and they had two daughters, Winnie and Maud Kemble. He is buried at Greenwich Cemetery in London.

Parliament of the United Kingdom
New constituency	Member of Parliament for Rotherhithe; 1885 – 1892	Succeeded by John Macdona
Baronetage of the United Kingdom
New creation	Baronet (of Cadogan Square); 1892–1928	Extinct
Preceded by Farquhar baronets	Hamilton baronets of Cadogan Square; 21 November 1892	Succeeded by Schroder baronets
