= 1983 Bermondsey by-election =

UK parliamentary by-election

- 24 February 1983

Bermondsey parliamentary seat
- Turnout: 57.7%
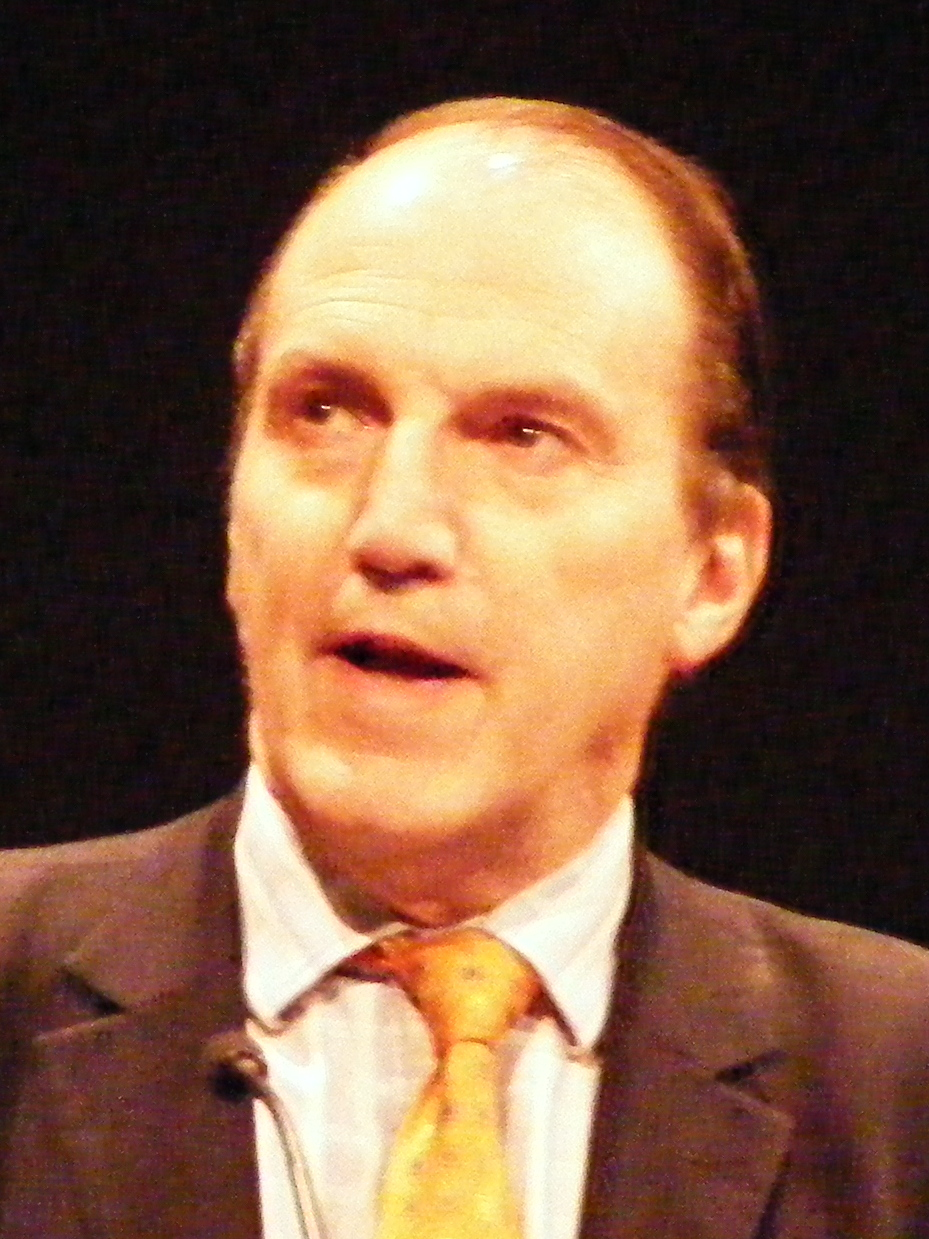

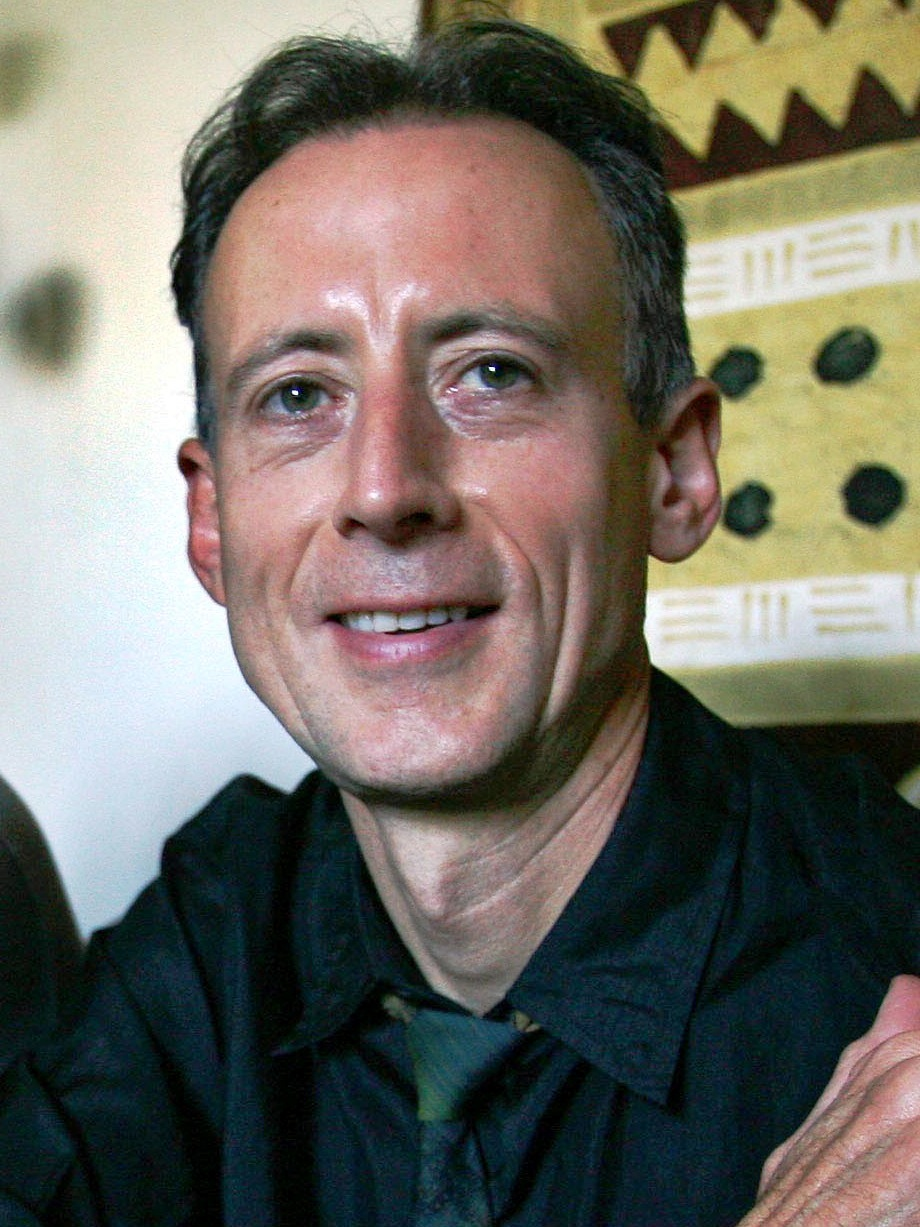
	First party	Second party
Candidate	Simon Hughes	Peter Tatchell
Party	Liberal	Labour
Alliance	Alliance
Popular vote	17,017	7,698
Percentage	57.7%	26.1%
Swing	▲50.9%	▼37.5%
	Third party	Fourth party
Candidate	John O'Grady	Robert Hughes
Party	Real Berm. Labour	Conservative
Popular vote	2,243	1,631
Percentage	7.6%	5.5%
Swing	New party	▼19.4%
MP before election
Bob Mellish
Labour
Subsequent MP
Simon Hughes
Liberal

On 24 February 1983, a by-election was held in the Bermondsey constituency in South London, following the resignation of Bob Mellish. Peter Tatchell stood as the candidate for the Labour Party, and Simon Hughes stood for the Liberal Party. Following a bitter campaign, the Liberals made huge gains and took the seat, with a majority of votes cast. Labour's vote fell from 63.6 per cent in May 1979 to 26.1 per cent as Tatchell came a distant second, while the Conservative candidate, Robert Hughes, managed only fourth place, losing his deposit. With a swing of 44.2%, the 1983 Bermondsey by-election is the largest by-election swing in British political history.

== Preliminaries ==
Bob Mellish had represented the constituency and its predecessors in the House of Commons since 1946. He was the Labour Chief Whip from 1969 until 1976, but had become disenchanted with the left-wing drift of the Labour Party. He resigned from the party in August and his Parliamentary seat in November 1982, amid much acrimony within the party. He had been in dispute with his constituency party for several years and had earlier threatened to resign if Peter Tatchell was selected as the next prospective parliamentary candidate. He was recruited by the Conservative government to the board of the London Docklands Development Corporation; as he did not wish to be disqualified, the post was made non-salaried until such time as Mellish chose to accept payment. This meant that Mellish had a paid job to go to as soon as he wanted.

On 7 November 1981, Bermondsey Labour Party selected Peter Tatchell, its secretary, as prospective Parliamentary candidate. Tatchell was a leading member of the left-wing faction that had taken control of the local party the previous year. He was also a contributor to London Labour Briefing, a magazine that circulated among the London left, and had written an article suggesting the use of extra-Parliamentary direct action by the Labour Party, saying: "We must look to new, more militant forms of extra-parliamentary opposition which involve mass popular participation and challenge the government's right to rule". This call to civil disobedience was considered a call to violent action by some, and was used "as a stick to beat [Tatchell] with" by political opponents. For example, the article came to the attention of James Wellbeloved, a former London Labour MP who had defected to the Social Democratic Party; Wellbeloved then referred to it in a Parliamentary Question to Margaret Thatcher on 3 December.

Labour Party leader Michael Foot responded to Wellbeloved by denouncing Tatchell's article and declared "the individual concerned is not an endorsed member of the Labour Party and as far as I'm concerned never will be". Tony Benn wrote in his diary that many people, including himself, thought that Foot had confused Peter Tatchell with Peter Taaffe, then the leader of the Trotskyist Militant tendency, and Michael Crick in his book on Militant agrees that the fact that Tatchell and Taaffe have similar names contributed to public confusion between the two, despite the fact that Militant opposed Tatchell's candidacy due to anti-gay feeling and political differences between the old left (Militant) and new left (Tatchell) of the party. As to whether Tatchell was a member of the Labour Party itself, Foot later clarified that he meant to say "endorsed candidate" instead of "endorsed member" in his response to Wellbeloved. At the next meeting of the Labour Party National Executive Committee, Tatchell was narrowly rejected as a candidate. Mellish was not reassured about the future direction of the Labour Party and resigned from it on 2 August 1982, a clear preliminary to resigning his seat, which he did by taking the Chiltern Hundreds on 1 November that year. The left wing of the Labour Party agreed Tatchell would be eligible for selection, and Tatchell was duly selected again in January 1983.

Tabloid newspapers had begun researching his background when Foot denounced him, in particular Tatchell's activities with the Gay Liberation Front in the early 1970s. Several stories were published which made it clear that he was gay.

== Other candidates ==
At the 1981 Greater London Council election, the Liberal Party had come second in Bermondsey. They chose their GLC candidate Simon Hughes, a barrister who had moved to the constituency earlier that year, to fight the by-election. The Conservatives chose Robert Hughes (no relation), who was a Greater London Council (GLC) councillor for Croydon Central. He later became the MP for Harrow West. Among those who applied for the Conservative nomination but were not chosen was Sara Keays, then having an as yet unrevealed affair with Cecil Parkinson.

The right-wing former Labour leader of Southwark Borough Council, John O'Grady, who had been a target for the left-wing faction locally, also decided to stand under the banner 'Real Bermondsey Labour' with Bob Mellish's support and encouragement. His campaign was dominated by personal opposition to Tatchell and defence of his leadership of the council. Twelve other candidates stood, including Screaming Lord Sutch, appearing for the first time under the Official Monster Raving Loony Party label, and the Dowager Lady Birdwood.

Esmond Bevan intended to stand as an independent Labour candidate, but erroneously entered his occupation in the section on the nomination papers headed 'description', thus appearing on ballot papers as "Systems Designer".

== Start of the campaign ==
The Labour campaign started disastrously when it was discovered that the first leaflets had been printed at Cambridge Heath Press, owned by the Militant tendency (then practising entryism in the Labour Party; a group whose five key members were expelled two days before polling day). The leaflets were all pulped and reprinted, but the cost of the first printing still counted against the limit for election spending.

== Attacks on Tatchell ==
There was much controversy over Tatchell's homosexuality, resulting in the campaign that was extremely bitter and described as the "dirtiest, most violent and homophobic by-election in modern British history". The Labour Party persuaded Tatchell to keep quiet about his sexual orientation, although he had previously declared himself 'out'.

Various campaigners for opposition candidates, as well as many within the Labour Party, made homophobic comments about Tatchell. Widespread graffiti throughout the constituency referred to him in derogatory terms, while some of those putting up posters in his support found their windows attacked. Members of the Liberal Party were accused of having joined in homophobic attacks on Tatchell. Male Liberal canvassers were seen wearing badges reading "I've been kissed by Peter Tatchell", although this seems to have been a poor taste joke by gay members of the Liberal Party. Liberal campaigners also published leaflets saying it was "a straight choice" between Liberal and Labour. The tabloid press vilified Tatchell for both his left-wing and pro-LGBT views, and he was targeted by far-right groups. Some of the other by-election candidates joined in: John O'Grady (Southwark Council leader, who was promoted as the 'Real Bermondsey' Labour candidacy by the previous MP, Bob Mellish) was filmed touring the constituency on the back of a horse and cart, singing a song which referred to Tatchell "wearing his trousers back to front". On the last weekend of the campaign, an anonymous leaflet was sent round the constituency headed "Which Queen will you vote for?", contrasting the republican Tatchell, who was pictured looking very effeminate, with Queen Elizabeth II. The leaflet gave Tatchell's home address and telephone number.

Tatchell claims he was assaulted in the street over 100 times while canvassing, including two attempts to run him down by car drivers, and that he received 30 death threats, including a bullet posted through his letterbox at night. His phone number and address were published, allegedly by the National Front.

While this was criticised by Roy Hattersley at a news conference, elements of the Labour party were also hostile to Tatchell on the grounds both of his politics and his sexuality. He would later recall: "Subjected to 15 months of media smears, anti-gay violence and sabotage by the right of the party, I lost what had been a safe Labour seat."

An alternative analysis of Tatchell's eventual defeat was given by David Sutch, the Official Monster Raving Loony Party candidate, in his 1991 autobiography. When being interviewed on TV at the by-election count, Sutch related to Tatchell how horrified he was at the treatment Tatchell had received, but added that "what I did not tell him was that he had been so bad a candidate that he had largely brought it on himself". Sutch criticised Tatchell's preference for press conferences and press releases rather than traditional meeting-and-greeting, which was generally regarded as the best way to win hearts and minds at a by-election. In a later interview, when the subject of Bermondsey came up, Sutch said that Tatchell "seemed to think all he needed to do to become the MP was turn up at the count".

In an interview with Simon Edge of The Independent published on 17 December 1996, the former Liberal Party Chief Executive, Andy Ellis, was asked whether he approved of the activity undertaken by the Liberal Gay Action Group, and replied "Nothing went on in Bermondsey that we were unhappy with".

During his campaign for leadership of the Liberal Democrats in January 2006, Hughes said he "had both homosexual and heterosexual relationships in the past" and apologised for the actions of Liberals in the Bermondsey campaign, saying that while a lot of the blame for homophobic abuse laid on the press, "I take responsibility" for the actions of his organisers, adding: "I have never been comfortable about the whole of that campaign, as Peter knows, and I said that to him in the past. ... Where there were things that were inappropriate or wrong, I apologise for that." Tatchell, by then a member of the Green Party, said that he had forgiven Hughes, saying "Simon benefited from these dirty tricks, but that was 23 years ago—I don't hold a grudge. It's time to forgive and move on", adding that Hughes should be judged on his 23-year record as an MP.

== Opinion polls ==
Bermondsey was one of the first by-elections to be extensively polled. The polls showed, at first, that the Labour vote was substantially down on the 1979 election figures, but that none of the rival candidates were particularly close. As the campaign went on, the Liberal candidate began to move into a clear second position and the other candidates faded. Later in the campaign, there were rumours which claimed that the right wing of the Labour Party nationally wished to lose the seat, as it would prove that left-wing Labour candidates were unelectable. By the eve of poll, it was clear that large numbers of previously Labour voters were defecting to other parties, and that non-Labour voters were lining up in support of the Liberal candidate as the one most likely to beat Labour.

== Result ==
The Liberals made huge gains and took the seat, with a majority of votes cast. Labour's vote fell from 63.6 per cent in May 1979 to 26.1 per cent as Tatchell came a distant second, while O'Grady took third. The Conservatives managed only fourth place, for the first time since the 1974 Newham South by-election, and the last in Britain until the 1991 Liverpool Walton by-election. All candidates other than Liberal and Labour lost their deposits.

Hughes would go on to represent Bermondsey and successor constituencies for the next 32 years, making him one of very few examples of MPs who took a formerly safe seat from another party and managed to hold it for a long period of time.

1983 Bermondsey by-election
Party	Candidate	Votes	%	±%
Liberal	Simon Hughes	17,017	57.7	▲50.9
Labour	Peter Tatchell	7,698	26.1	▼37.5
Real Bermondsey Labour	John O'Grady	2,243	7.6	New
Conservative	Robert Hughes	1,631	5.5	▼19.4
National Front	James Sneath	426	1.4	▼2.5
Monster Raving Loony	David Sutch	97	0.3	New
Independent Patriot	Jane Birdwood	69	0.2	New
New Britain	Michael Keulemans	62	0.2	New
Independent Labour	Barry Giddings	50	0.2	New
Communist	Robert Gordon	50	0.2	New
Ecology	George Hannah	45	0.2	New
Revolutionary Communist	Fran Eden	38	0.1	New
National Labour Party	Ann King	25	0.1	New
United Democratic Party	Alan Baker	15	0.1	New
ACMFT	David Wedgwood	15	0.1	New
Systems Designer	Esmond Bevan	8	0.0	New
Majority		9,319	31.6	N/A
Turnout		29,489	57.7	–1.6
Liberal gain from Labour		Swing	+44.2	

The result for the previous election was:

1979 general election: Bermondsey
Party	Candidate	Votes	%	±%
Labour	Bob Mellish	19,338	63.6	–9.8
Conservative	Alexander Duma	7,582	24.9	+11.1
Liberal	Thomas Taylor	2,072	6.8	–1.3
National Front	James Sneath	1,175	3.9	–0.9
Workers Revolutionary	Anthony Moore	239	0.8	New
Majority		11,756	38.7	–20.9
Turnout		30,406	59.3	–2.9
Labour hold		Swing	–10.5	

== See also ==
- Bermondsey (UK Parliament constituency)
- Miranda Grell
