= National Fellowship =

British right-wing party

- Chairperson: Edward Martell
- Founder: Edward Martell
- Founded: 1 January 1962
- Dissolved: 1968
- Newspaper: The New Daily
- Ideology: Libertarian conservative
- Political position: Right-wing

The National Fellowship was a minor right-wing libertarian conservative political party in the United Kingdom.

== History ==
The party was launched under Chairman Edward Martell on 1 January 1962, with full page advertisements in national broadsheets. The advert referred to the organisation as part of a movement spearheaded by The New Daily newspaper. They claimed that they would mostly attract supporters from the Conservative Party, but attacked Iain Macleod as "inclined to a mild sort of socialism". The initial policies listed included opposition to many trade union activities, anti-communism, cuts to government expenditure and welfare and more restrictions on immigration. The associated advisory committee included former chairman of the Liberal Party Lord Moynihan, Conservative MPs Donald Johnson and Henry Kerby and former Liberal MP Don Bennett. Moynihan's support to the party led to his removal as a vice-president of the Yorkshire Area Liberal Federation.

The advert also gave details of an Establishment Committee. This prompted Peter Cook and Nicholas Luard to write to The Guardian noting that this was unconnected with their recently created club, The Establishment, but that they hoped it would provide them with material for their comedy shows.

The party planned to stand a candidate in the 1962 Leicester North East by-election. The Conservative candidate, Robin Marlar, attended a meeting they organised, but left as soon as he was invited to speak, stating that he had "nothing but contempt" for their plans. Despite this, the Fellowship decided not to put up a candidate. In early 1963, Martell joined the Conservative Party, but maintained the Fellowship.

The Fellowship's first candidacy was at the 1963 Bristol South East by-election. A 1961 by-election in the constituency was won by Labour Party politician Tony Benn, but he was disqualified by reason of his peerage, and the seat was instead awarded to second-placed Conservative Malcolm St Clair. As the law had been changed, permitting Benn to renounce his peerage, St Clair agreed to stand down and the Conservatives did not run a candidate in the by-election. Martell attempted to persuade either of two local businessmen to stand for the Fellowship against Benn, but both refused. Instead, Martell stood himself. The Fellowship was Benn's main challenger from the right. Martell took a distant second place, with 19% of the vote, becoming the first independent candidate in 17 years to hold his deposit.

The party spent most of its funds supporting favoured Conservatives at the 1964 general election, and Martell wrote to all previous donors, asking for personal loans, repayable on 14 days' notice. He soon proved unable to repay these loans, prompting questions in Parliament. In July 1966, he merged the Fellowship with other campaigns he had run, including the "Freedom Group", into the National Party. The new party announced their intention to contest at least the next five by-elections, but ultimately their only candidate was Bennett, who took last place in the 1967 Nuneaton by-election. Martell was declared bankrupt in 1968, after which the party disappeared.
