= Bob Mellish =

British politician (1913–1998)

The Right Honourable The Lord Mellish PC
- Mellish in 1964

Government Chief Whip in the House of Commons Parliamentary Secretary to the Treasury
- In office 4 March 1974 – 8 April 1976
- Prime Minister: Harold Wilson
- Deputy: Walter Harrison
- Preceded by: Humphrey Atkins
- Succeeded by: Michael Cocks
- In office 30 April 1969 – 19 June 1970
- Prime Minister: Harold Wilson
- Deputy: Charles Grey; Charles Morris
- Preceded by: John Silkin
- Succeeded by: Francis Pym

Opposition Chief Whip in the House of Commons
- In office 19 June 1970 – 4 March 1974
- Deputy: Walter Harrison
- Leader: Harold Wilson
- Preceded by: William Whitelaw
- Succeeded by: Humphrey Atkins

Minister of Housing and Local Government
- In office 31 May 1970 – 19 June 1970
- Prime Minister: Harold Wilson
- Preceded by: Tony Greenwood
- Succeeded by: Peter Walker

Minister of Public Buildings and Works
- In office 29 August 1967 – 30 April 1969
- Prime Minister: Harold Wilson
- Preceded by: Reg Prentice
- Succeeded by: John Silkin

Parliamentary Secretary to the Ministry of Housing and Local Government
- In office 18 October 1964 – 29 August 1967
- Prime Minister: Harold Wilson

Member of Parliament for Bermondsey (Rotherhithe 1946–1950)
- In office 19 November 1946 – 1 November 1982
- Preceded by: Ben Smith
- Succeeded by: Simon Hughes

Personal details
- Born: Robert Joseph Mellish; 3 March 1913 Deptford, London, England
- Died: 9 May 1998 (aged 85) Sompting, West Sussex, England
- Party: Independent Labour
- Other political affiliations: Labour (until 1982)
- Spouse: Anne Warner (m. 1938)
- Children: 5
- Parent(s): John Mellish & Mary Carroll

Robert Joseph Mellish, Baron Mellish, PC (3 March 1913 – 9 May 1998) was a British politician. He was a long-serving Labour Party MP of 36 years, from 1946 to 1982. He served as the Labour Chief Whip from 1969 until 1976, but in his later years he fell out with his local Constituency Labour Party which he felt had become dominated by people on the left of the Labour Party, and he eventually left the party. He became a life peer in 1985.

== Early life ==
Mellish was born in Deptford to John Mellish and his wife Mary Elizabeth Carroll, the thirteenth of fourteen children. Eight of his siblings died from illnesses in childhood. His father, a docker, had taken part in the dockers' strikes of 1899 and 1912. After he left school he worked for the Transport and General Workers' Union and when the Second World War started in 1939 he was called up and ended the war as a major in the Royal Engineers fighting the Japanese in South-East Asia.

== Political career ==
When Sir Ben Smith resigned from Parliament, the Rotherhithe constituency was vacated. Most local opinion favoured Dr John Gillison who represented the area on the London County Council but Mellish was selected after the TGWU dockers' delegates voted for him en bloc. He easily won the constituency in a by-election in 1946. This constituency was expanded in 1950 and named Bermondsey.

In 1950 he was appointed Parliamentary Private Secretary to the Minister of Supply, George Strauss, and then in 1951 as PPS to the Minister for Pensions, George Isaacs. He was also Chairman of the London Regional Labour Party from 1956 to 1977.

Mellish was appointed by Harold Wilson as a Parliamentary Secretary to the Treasury (Chief Whip) which he held during Labour Governments from 1969 to 1970 and again from 1974 to 1976. He was renowned as a tough Chief Whip. He was Parliamentary Under-Secretary to the Minister for Housing and Local Government from Labour's victory in 1964 until 1967, then becoming Minister of Public Building and Works from 1967 until 1969. He became Minister for Housing and Local Government in 1970; however, this was now under Anthony Crosland as Secretary of State for Local Government and Regional Planning.

Mellish was in favour of Britain's entry into the Common Market but voted to oppose Edward Heath's policy of entry in 1971, in accordance with Labour Party policy. A Wilson loyalist, Mellish apparently wept when he heard the news that Wilson had stepped down as Prime Minister in 1976. He supported Michael Foot to replace Wilson, but in vain; James Callaghan won the leadership ballot instead. Mellish (who got on well at a personal level with Foot, despite the great ideological differences between the two men) disliked Callaghan so much that he resigned from the cabinet within months of Wilson's own retirement.

At one stage Mellish opened a speech by saying "As I come to this platform, many of you will know that I have never been an anti-racialist". In 1976 Mellish argued that the Malawi Asians expelled by Hastings Banda should not be allowed to live in Britain despite possessing British passports:

We cannot go on like this. I do not care what those on this side of the House, or the Opposition side or anywhere else, say. Problems at local level will become worse and worse for our own people unless something is done. All hon. Members know that people come to their surgeries describing the most distressing conditions—terrifying conditions. People born and bred in their own constituencies have been on the housing waiting list for as long as six years. But, on the points system, one must give immigrants preference...People cannot come here just because they have a British passport—full stop.

== London Docklands Development Corporation ==
The government of Margaret Thatcher was keen to get a Labour figure to sit on the London Docklands Development Corporation as vice-chairman in 1980 but the Labour Party was entirely opposed to the creation of the LDDC and refused to nominate. Mellish offered a way through as he was willing to take the post; as a sitting MP he would lose his seat if the post was paid, so a special provision was made that it would be unpaid until the vice-chairman elected to take payment. Mellish's acceptance of a post with the LDDC exacerbated the split with the Bermondsey CLP which had elected a slate of left-wing officers at its annual meeting that same year.

== Bermondsey by-election ==
Mellish was against the shift to the Left in the Labour Party and decided not to stand for election again. Tam Dalyell later said that "Mellish's final years in the Commons were dogged by controversy and beset with troubles in Bermondsey from hard-left 'yuppie' incomers and the Militant tendency, people who were moons apart from the dockers who had selected him four decades earlier". He wanted his ally John O'Grady, Leader of Southwark Borough Council, to be selected in his stead but the constituency party selected Peter Tatchell, its secretary. Mellish made his discontent public and threatened to resign immediately and force a by-election if Tatchell was endorsed by the Labour Party nationally. Unexpectedly, Labour leader Michael Foot announced that Tatchell would never be endorsed "so far as I am concerned".

However, by August 1982, it became clear that Tatchell would be permitted to stand if the Constituency Labour Party selected him again. In response, Mellish resigned from the Labour Party, a move that he later regretted according to Dalyell. In November, he resigned his seat in Parliament (by becoming Steward of the Chiltern Hundreds) and forced a 1983 by-election in which Mellish campaigned for O'Grady who stood as a Real Bermondsey Labour candidate. O'Grady performed badly at the by-election although Mellish did take some satisfaction from the heavy defeat of Tatchell by the Liberal candidate, Simon Hughes. Tatchell said in 2003, after Mellish's death, that Mellish was secretly bisexual and was "persistent" in propositioning Tatchell but warned him when he was rebuffed not to publicise it as no one would believe him.

== Later life ==
Mellish later joined the Social Democratic Party (SDP). In 1985 he stood down from the LDDC and accepted a life peerage on 12 July 1985 as Baron Mellish, of Bermondsey in Greater London, sitting as an independent. Mellish was a supporter of Millwall Football Club and was president of the Millwall Supporters Club. In 1995 during a debate on the commemorations for the fiftieth anniversary of Victory over Japan Day, Hugh Jenkins expressed "sorrow and regret" about the atomic bombings of Hiroshima and Nagasaki. Mellish replied:

While on board we heard that the war was over. I have never prayed so hard nor been so grateful for anything as I was for that atom bomb. It was the finest thing that ever happened that we should have dropped it on those villains. When we reached Port Swettenham, the ramifications would have been unbelievable. Thousands of lives would have been lost and, at the time, I thanked God for the atom bomb.

Mellish died at a care home in Sompting, West Sussex, on 9 May 1998, at the age of 85. At the time of his death, he had cancer and Parkinson's disease.

== Personal life and legacy ==
Mellish married Anne Warner in 1938. They had five sons.

The tallest building in Milton Keynes, Mellish Court, is named after him.

== Notes ==
Parliament of the United Kingdom
Preceded by Ben Smith	Member of Parliament for Rotherhithe; 1946–1950	Constituency abolished
New constituency	Member of Parliament for Bermondsey; 1950–1982	Succeeded by Simon Hughes
Political offices
Preceded by Edward Astley	Parliamentary Secretary to the Minister of State for Housing and Local Government; 1964–1967	Succeeded by James MacColl
Preceded by Reg Prentice	Minister of Public Buildings and Works; 1967–1969	Succeeded by John Silkin
Preceded by John Silkin	Parliamentary Secretary to the Treasury; 1969–1970	Succeeded by Francis Pym
Preceded by Humphrey Atkins	Parliamentary Secretary to the Treasury; 1974–1976	Succeeded by Michael Cocks
Party political offices
Preceded by Charles Brandon	Chairman of the London Labour Party; 1956–1977	Succeeded by Arthur Latham
Preceded by John Silkin	Labour Chief Whip in the House of Commons; 1969–1976	Succeeded by Michael Cocks
