= James Jameson (British Army officer) =

Surgeon-General James Jameson CB KStJ
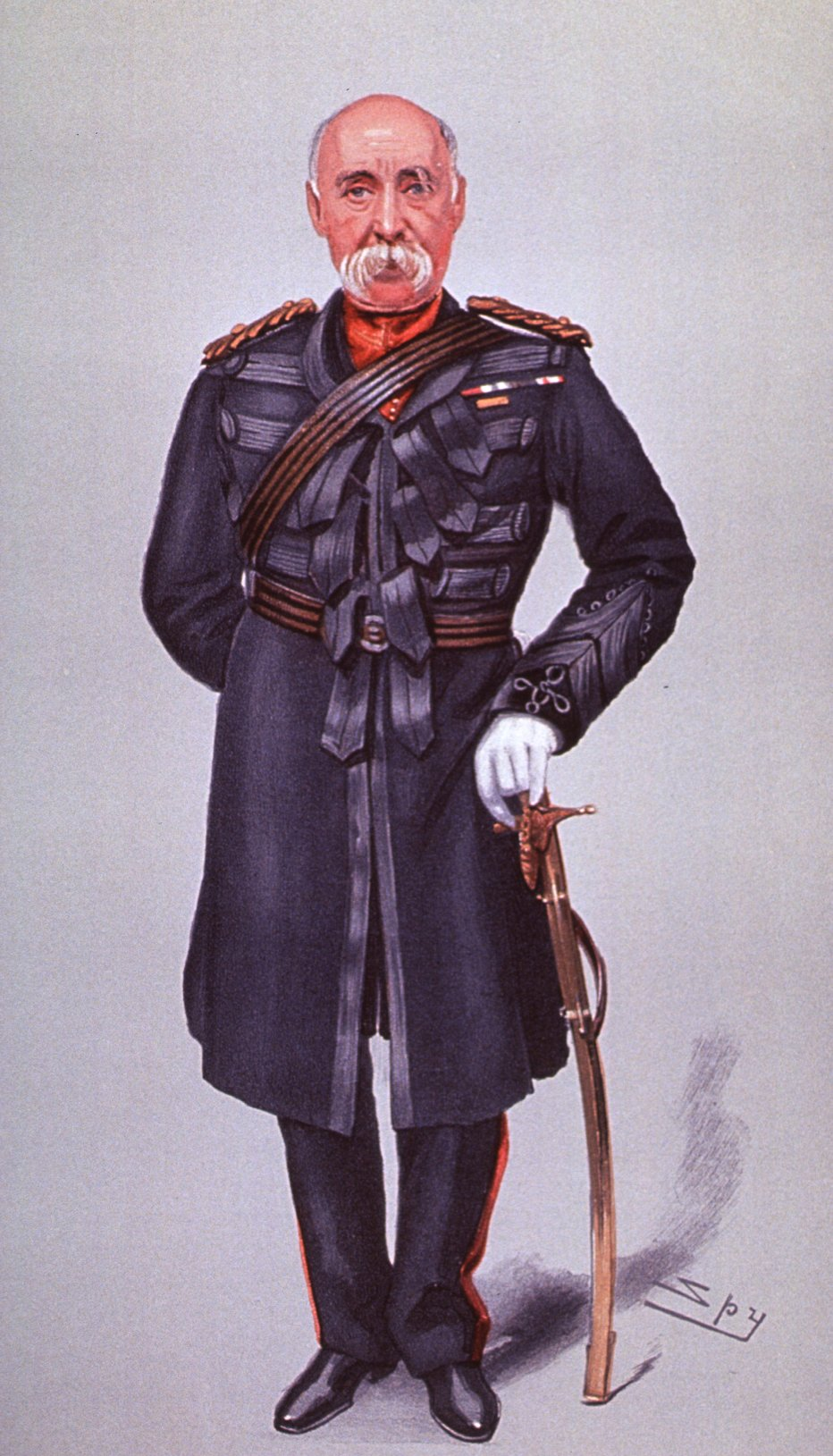
- James Jameson, Vanity Fair, 1 August 1901
- Born: 15 August 1837; Kilbirnie, Ayrshire
- Died: 13 September 1904 (aged 67); Eltham, Kent
- Burial place: Greenwich Cemetery
- Military career
- Allegiance: United Kingdom
- Branch: British Army
- Service years: 1857–1901
- Rank: Surgeon-General
- Commands: Army Medical Services
- Awards: Companion of the Order of the Bath

Surgeon-General James Jameson CB KStJ (15 August 1837 – 13 September 1904) was a British Army surgeon during the late 19th century, seeing service during the Franco-Prussian War and heading the Army Medical Services from 1896 to 1901, during which time the Royal Army Medical Corps was established.

== Early career ==
Born in Kilbirnie, Ayrshire, Jameson was educated at Glasgow University, and entered the Army as a staff assistant surgeon in 1857. He saw service in Canada (1862) and in Trinidad (1870), where he was promoted to Surgeon for service during a yellow fever epidemic. He commanded a division of the English Ambulance during the Franco-Prussian War (1870–1871) and was promoted to Surgeon Major in 1873.

== Royal Army Medical Corps ==
He was appointed Brigade Surgeon in 1883, deputy Surgeon General in 1888, and Surgeon Major-General in 1893. In 1896, he succeeded Sir William MacKinnon as Director General in 1896, retaining the post until his retirement in 1901, by which time he had overseen operations in the Second Boer War.

The Royal Army Medical Corps was established during Jameson's term in office, and the South African campaign confirmed the need for strong medical support beyond that previously provided by the Army Medical Department.

Until this time there had been considerable unhappiness in the Army medical service, with staff not given military rank and awarded fewer honours and awards than the Army Service Corps. The British Medical Journal campaigned for better conditions, as did the British Medical Association, the Royal College of Physicians and others, but with no effect on the Secretary of State for War until 1898. Then officers and soldiers providing medical services were finally incorporated into a new body: the Royal Army Medical Corps.

Military authorities used Jameson as a scapegoat for the previous medical failings outside his control, but his medical colleagues marked his retirement with a complimentary dinner, testifying to "the esteem in which they continued to hold him".

He died at his home in Eltham on 13 September 1904 and was buried with military honours in Greenwich Cemetery on 17 September 1904.

== Family ==
Jameson married the daughter of the Rev Robert David Cartwright, of Kingston, Canada, who survived him with five sons and a daughter. Two of the sons were officers in the RAMC.
