= The New Daily (British newspaper) =

British newspaper (1960s)

- Editor: Edward Martell
- Founded: 1960
- Ceased publication: 1967
- Political alignment: Right-wing; Anti-trade union
- Country: United Kingdom
- Circulation: 100,000

The New Daily was a minor newspaper in the United Kingdom. It was edited from April 1960 by the political activist Edward Martell, and was associated with his National Fellowship party founded in 1962. The paper took an anti–trade union stance and reached a circulation of 100,000.

Its dates of publication were 1960 to 1967, according to one national library that holds copies.
