= Walter Napleton Stone =

English Victoria Cross recipient (1891-1917)

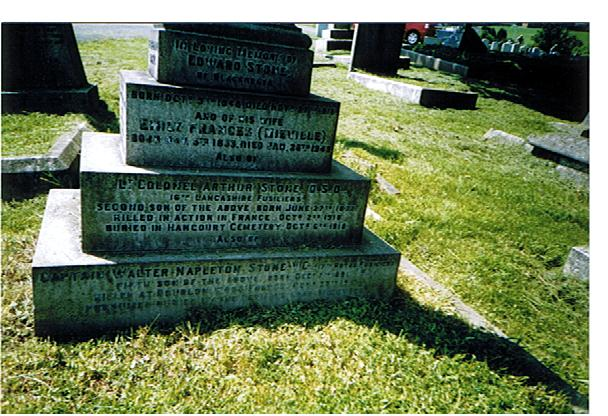
- Born: 7 December 1891; Blackheath, London
- Died: 30 November 1917 (aged 25); Cambrai sector, France
- Military career
- Allegiance: United Kingdom
- Branch: British Army
- Service years: 1914 - 1917
- Rank: Captain
- Units: Royal Fusiliers
- Conflicts: First World War: Western Front; Battle of Cambrai †
- Awards: Victoria Cross

Walter Napleton Stone VC (7 December 1891 – 30 November 1917) was an English recipient of the Victoria Cross, the highest and most prestigious award for gallantry in the face of the enemy that can be awarded to British and Commonwealth forces. He was born in Blackheath, London.

== Details ==
Born on 7 December 1891 to Edward and Emily Frances Stone, of Blackheath, London. Stone was educated at Harrow School and Pembroke College, Cambridge.

As a 25-year-old, he was an Acting Captain in the 3rd Battalion, The Royal Fusiliers, British Army, attached 17th (Service) Battalion during the First World War. He was awarded the Victoria Cross for his actions on 30 November 1917 in the Cambrai Sector, France, which led to his death.

=== Citation ===
For most conspicuous bravery when in command of a company in an isolated position 1,000 yards in front of the main line, and overlooking the enemy's position. He observed the enemy massing for an attack, and afforded invaluable information to battalion headquarters. He was ordered to withdraw his company, leaving a rearguard to cover the withdrawal. The attack developing with unexpected speed, Capt. Stone sent three platoons back and remained with the rearguard himself. He stood on the parapet with the telephone under a tremendous bombardment, observing the enemy and continued to send back valuable information until the wire was cut by his orders. The rearguard was eventually surrounded and cut to pieces, and Capt. Stone was seen fighting to the last till he was shot through the head. The extraordinary coolness of this heroic officer and the accuracy of his information enabled dispositions to be made just in time to save the line and avert disaster.

— The London Gazette, 12 February 1918

== Further information ==
There is a memorial to Walter Napleton Stone in Greenwich Cemetery, south-east London. About thirty yards in front of the War Memorial is a group of graves of the Stone family. On the largest are the names of Walter's parents, and underneath the inscription:

"also in memory of Lt Col Arthur Stone DSO, 16th Lanc Fusiliers, second son of the above, killed 2 October 1918......; and Capt Walter Napleton Stone VC, 17th Royal Fusiliers, fifth son of the above, killed Bourlon Wood, France, 30 November 1917, presumed buried by the Germans near Moeuvres."

His actual grave has never been located and he is commemorated on the Cambrai Memorial to the Missing.

"W.N. Stone VC DSO MC" is listed on the parish war memorial in the Trinity Chapel of St Mary's Church, Shrewsbury. There has been no evidence found he lived in Shrewsbury, nor did he receive the Distinguished Service Order or Military Cross.

== Bibliography ==
- Monuments to Courage (David Harvey, 1999)
- The Register of the Victoria Cross (This England, 1997)
- Gliddon, Gerald (2004) [2012]. VCs of the First World War: Cambrai 1917. The History Press. ISBN 978-0-75-247668-1.
