= Norah Runge =

British politician (1884–1978)

Norah Runge OBE
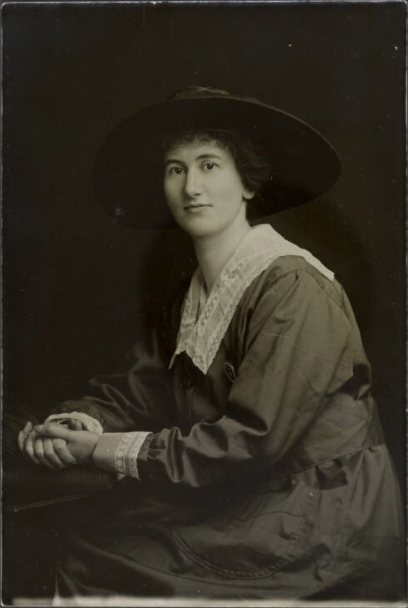

Member of Parliament for Rotherhithe
- In office 27 October 1931 – 25 October 1935
- Prime Minister: Stanley Baldwin
- Preceded by: Ben Smith
- Succeeded by: Ben Smith

Personal details
- Born: Norah Cecil Runge; 1884
- Died: 6 June 1978 (aged 93–94)
- Party: Conservative

Norah Cecil Runge, OBE (1884 – 6 June 1978) was a Conservative politician in the United Kingdom.

== Career ==
Runge acted as superintendent of the soldiers and sailors day and night free buffet at Paddington Station during World War I for which she was awarded an O.B.E.

She was elected member of parliament for Rotherhithe, East London in the 1931 Conservative landslide, gaining the seat from Labour incumbent Benjamin Smith, overcoming a socialist majority of 10,000 to win by 130 seats becoming one of the thirteen women elected to parliament. Runge held the seat until 1935, when it was regained by Smith.

She was subsequently created an alderman on London County Council in 1937, remaining a member of the council until 1961.

One of Norah Runge's parliamentary archive collection scrapbooks, YRUN/1 press cuttings made by her daughter documenting her political career was featured exhibit of the month, August 2026 at the National Archives, Kew on floor 1.

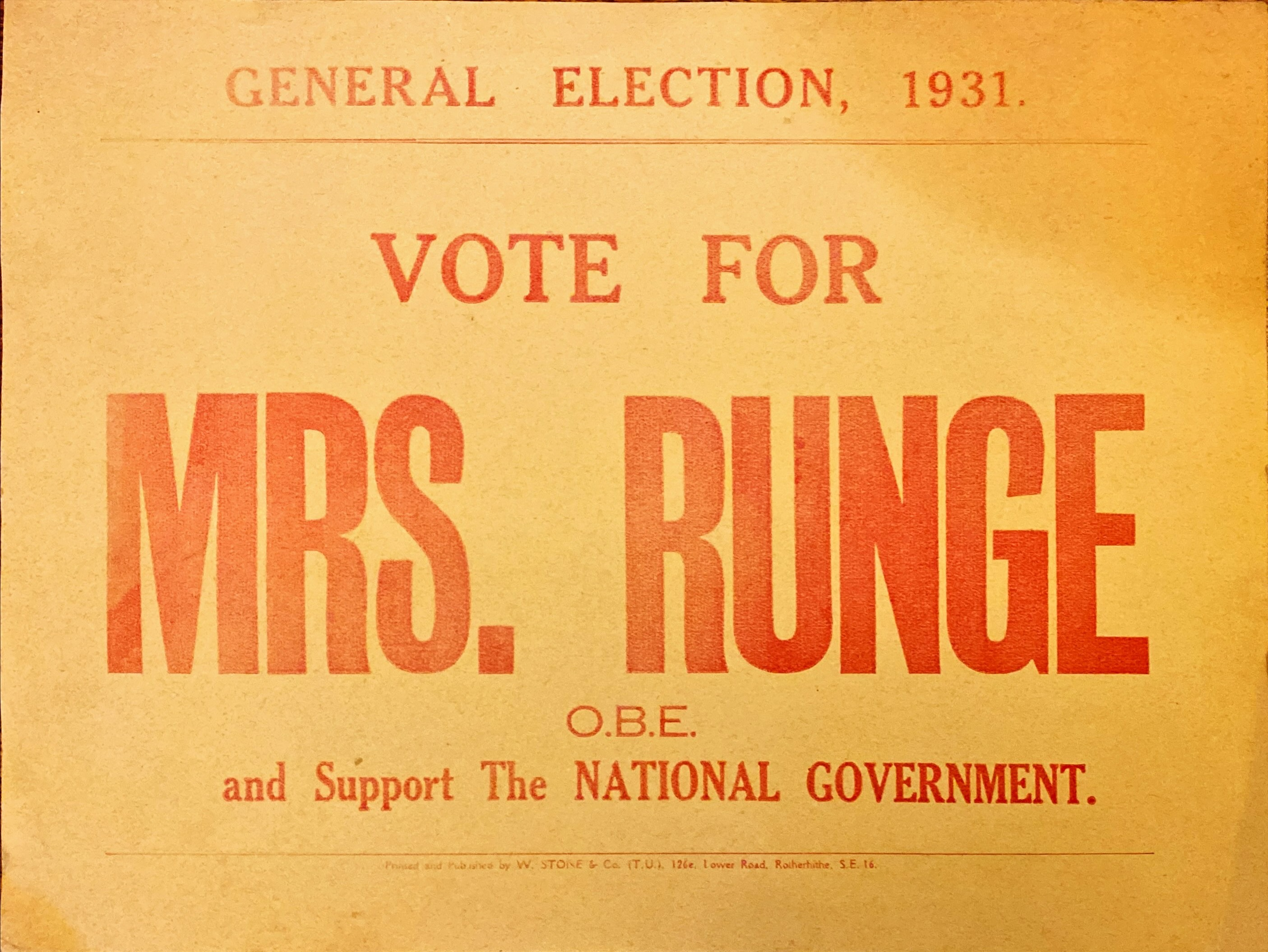
Windowbill from the 1931 UK General Election in support of Mrs Runge and the National Government.

Parliament of the United Kingdom
Preceded by Ben Smith	Member of Parliament for Rotherhithe; 1931 – 1935	Succeeded by Ben Smith
