= Perceval M. Parsons =

English engineer

Perceval Parsons
- Born: Perceval Moses Parsons; 1819; London, England
- Died: 5 November 1892 (aged 72–73); Blackheath, London, England
- Occupations: Civil and mechanical engineer, metallurgist
- Years active: 1841 - c.1892
- Notable work: Manganese bronze alloys
- Spouse: Anne Jane Rexford
- Children: 11

Perceval Moses Parsons (1819-5 November 1892) was an English civil and mechanical engineer and inventor particularly associated with advances in artillery, railway engineering, and metallurgy. He developed the manganese bronze alloy used extensively in the manufacture of ships' propellers.

== Early career ==
Parsons was a son of John Parsons of Scraptoft, Leicestershire, and was born in Stockwell in south London. Schooled privately in Shooter's Hill, he displayed an aptitude for engineering and, from the age of 15, studied for two years at Portsmouth Dockyard before being articled to Messrs. Braithwaite & Milner in London. In 1841, he was employed on railway engineering work by Peter Bruff, working as a resident engineer on the Eastern Counties Railway until 1845. In 1846, Parsons was employed on engineering work by John Rennie, engaged as superintendent of large fixed plant and machinery on the Eastern Union Railway. He then established his own engineering business in London in 1850, being mainly concerned with design and construction of railway fittings, patenting improved switches and axle-boxes.

== Engineer ==
=== Central London railway ===
In 1853, Parsons developed proposals to construct a central London railway following the route of the modern day Metropolitan and District Lines, connecting with other London lines, and involving a large central station at Embankment Gardens. The proposal was approved by Robert Stephenson (appointed consulting engineer); John Hawkshaw was to be chief engineer, with Parsons among the acting engineers. However, the scheme was not developed due to the Crimean War (1853-1856).

=== Ordnance patent ===
Parson's ordnance inventions included a system of inserting rifled steel tubes into old cast-iron guns, making previously unusable weapons serviceable. An initial trial by the Ordnance Committee in 1860 was not favourable, and Parsons, believing his invention had been rejected, let his 1855 patent lapse. However, in 1862, William Palliser patented an almost identical system of converting guns, and Parsons reasserted his claim to be the original inventor of the system, eventually, following an adjudication by Charles Hutton, receiving £1,000 compensation from the War Office.

=== Metallurgy ===
In 1871 Parsons was appointed engineer to the Bessemer Steel and Ordnance Co, and supervised construction of new works at East Greenwich. During this time he started studying the use of metals generally, establishing a private mechanical laboratory at his home in Blackheath. His experiments led to the production of a better compound of copper, tin, zinc and lead, called 'white brass', which was used for marine engines, and later 'manganese bronze' (combining ferro-manganese with bronze and brass alloys), which became extensively used in manufacture of ship propellers. Following an 1876 patent for manganese bronze, Parsons established his own company, P. M. Parsons, to produce the metal at St George's Wharf, in Deptford. On 28 June 1882, the Manganese Bronze and Brass Co was incorporated and acquired Parsons' company, retaining Parsons as one of the directors.

Between 1851 and 1889 Parsons took out 52 patents, including 19 concerning artillery and related military appliances, 11 concerning railway apparatus, and one relating to metallurgy. He was elected a Member of the Institution of Civil Engineers on 2 December 1873.

== Personal life ==
Parsons married Anne Jane Rexford (daughter of a school mistress running a school in Greenwich South Street) at St Alfege Church, Greenwich on 20 August 1851; they subsequently had 11 children. He died from an attack of apoplexy on 5 November 1892 at his home, Melbourne House at 136 Shooters Hill Road in Blackheath, and was buried in Greenwich Cemetery on 10 November 1892. His wife died, aged 78, on 26 June 1905 and was also buried in Greenwich Cemetery.
