= Edward Martell (politician) =

British politician (1909–1989)

Member of the London County Council for Bethnal Green South West
- In office 1946 – 1949 Serving with Percy Harris
- Preceded by: John Edward Anthony King; Reginald Stamp
- Succeeded by: Constituency abolished

Personal details
- Born: 2 March 1909
- Died: 3 April 1989 (aged 80)
- Party: Liberal (until 1956); National Fellowship (1962–1968)
- Spouse: Ethel Maud Beverley (m. 1932)
- Children: 1
- Education: St George's School, Harpenden
- Occupation: Politician, libertarian activist

Military service
- Allegiance: United Kingdom
- Branch: British Army
- Rank: Captain
- Unit: Royal Armoured Corps
- War: World War II

Edward Drewett Martell (2 March 1909 – 3 April 1989) was a British politician and libertarian activist.

== Family and education ==
Martell was the eldest son of E. E. Martell and Ethel Horwood. He was educated at St George's School, Harpenden. In 1932 he married Ethel Maud Beverley. They had one son.

== Journalism ==
Martell worked in the coal trade from 1926 to 1928 and then entered journalism. He was News Editor of the World's Press News; general manager, The Saturday Review; Managing Editor, Burke's Peerage and Burke Publishing Co.and sports staff editor of The Star. He served in the Second World War in the Royal Armoured Corps attaining the rank of captain. On demobilisation he established his own bookselling and publishing company.

== Liberal Party ==
Martell played a prominent role in the Liberal election campaigns of 1950 and 1951. One historian of the Liberal Party praised Martell's contribution to Liberal politics, his ceaseless flow of ideas, his great enthusiasm and his work with another official of the party, Philip Fothergill, in securing broadly based finance for the party, while at the same time damning him as a man with the makings of a dictator and possessing wild judgment. Roy Douglas and Mark Egan have said that whilst Martell was never elected to parliament and was a member of the Liberal Party for less than a decade, "there is much to be said for the view that he played a major part in keeping the party in existence, when it could easily have disappeared as a serious political force".

Martell was the secretary of the Liberal Candidates' Association in the mid-1940s, and in 1946 was elected to the London County Council together with the former member of parliament Sir Percy Harris in the two-member seat of Bethnal Green South West, the first Liberal LCC victories for many years. In November of that year he stood unsuccessfully as the Liberal candidate in the Parliamentary by-election for the safe Labour seat of Rotherhithe, although he beat the Conservative candidate into third place. He also contested Hendon North for the Liberals at the 1950 general election.

== Libertarian activist ==
In September 1956 Martell left the Liberal Party. With other dissident Liberals, such as former Liberal Treasurer Lord Moynihan and former Liberal member of parliament Horace Crawfurd, he set up the People's League for the Defence of Freedom, which was later part of the Freedom Group. In 1962 Martell joined the Conservative Party and in 1963 was chairman of the Hastings Conservative association. His anti-trade union newspaper, The New Daily, reached a circulation of 100,000.

In 1958, during a London bus crew strike, the People's League ran replacement buses and in the "work-to-rule" of postal service workers in January 1962 it ran a letter delivery service which was suppressed by the Postmaster General. However the League delivered parcels for three weeks, using its own stamps, until the "work-to-rule" came to an end. This effort was repeated in July 1964 during the one-day strike and overtime ban for postal workers, again with the League's own stamps.

Martell has been described as "an expert self-publicist" who exercised "a volatile influence on public opinion during periods of government unpopularity".

=== Bristol South East by-election ===
At the 1963 Bristol South East by-election, which followed Tony Benn's successful campaign to be allowed to give up his peerage and membership of the House of Lords, the Conservatives decided not to fight the by-election. Martell seized the chance to stand against Benn as a National Fellowship or "independent right-wing" candidate, and in the event was the only serious opposition to Benn's re-election. He attacked Benn for his absence from the constituency during the early stages of the campaign and continued to run a high-profile campaign, arranging such publicity stunts as betting the local newspaper editor that he would retain his deposit, claiming to have received telephone threats and publicly calling on the Bristol Conservative Party to endorse him, as well as publishing his own 'Election Special' that accused Benn of hawking his peerage to the highest bidder. During the campaign Geoffrey Pearl, who had been nominated as an "anti-socialist" candidate, dropped out of the race and called on his supporters to vote for Martell.

Martell's strong anti-trade union line counted against him, as local union activists threw themselves wholeheartedly into Benn's campaign. Ultimately Martell came second with 4,834 votes (19%). Benn later claimed that Martell's post-election speech saw him turn his anger on the crowd after much of what he said was drowned out by Benn supporters.

== Publications ==
- (with R. G. Burnett) The Devil's Camera, 1932;
- (with R. G. Burnett) The Smith Slayer, 1940;
- The Menace of Nationalisation, 1952;
- The Menace of the Trade Unions, 1957;
- Need the Bell Toll?, 1958;
- (with Ewan Butler) Murder of the News-Chronicle and the Star, 1960;
- Wit and Wisdom-Old and New, 1961;
- A Book of Solutions, 1962

== See also ==
- The New Daily
