= Ben Smith (Labour politician) =

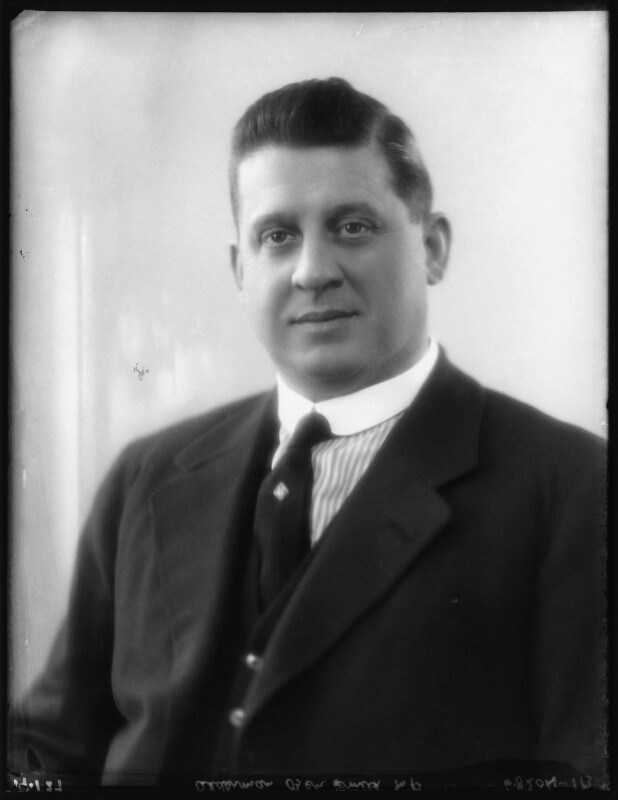
Rt Hon Sir Ben Smith as Minister for Food

Sir Benjamin Smith (29 January 1879 – 5 May 1964) was a Labour Party politician in England.

A driver of one of London's first taxicabs, Smith became the first organiser for the London Cab Drivers' Union. He was national organiser of the Transport and General Workers' Union from its formation in 1922 until he was elected to Parliament in 1923. He was sworn in as a member of His Majesty's Most Honourable Privy Council in 1943. This gave him the honorific title "The Right Honourable" for life.

Smith was member of Parliament (MP) for Rotherhithe from 1923 until 1931 and from 1935 until 1946. He served as Minister of Food in the 1945 Attlee ministry until his resignation in May 1946 to become chairman of West Midlands Coal Board.

Parliament of the United Kingdom
Preceded by John Lort-Williams	Member of Parliament for Rotherhithe; 1923 – 1931	Succeeded by Norah Runge
Preceded by Norah Runge	Member of Parliament for Rotherhithe; 1935 – 1946	Succeeded by Bob Mellish
Trade union offices
Preceded by A. B. Hall and Charles Hobson	Auditor of the Trades Union Congress; 1919; With: John Robertson	Succeeded by Walter Smith and William Straker
Preceded by Charlie Cramp and Alonzo Swales	Trades Union Congress representative to the American Federation of Labour; 1925; With: A. A. Purcell	Succeeded by John Bromley and George Hicks
Political offices
Preceded by George Hennessy	Treasurer of the Household; 1929–1931	Succeeded by George Hennessy
Preceded by John Llewellin	Minister of Food; 1945–1946	Succeeded by John Strachey
