= Rotherhithe (UK Parliament constituency) =

Parliamentary constituency in the United Kingdom, 1885–1950

- Former borough constituency for the House of Commons
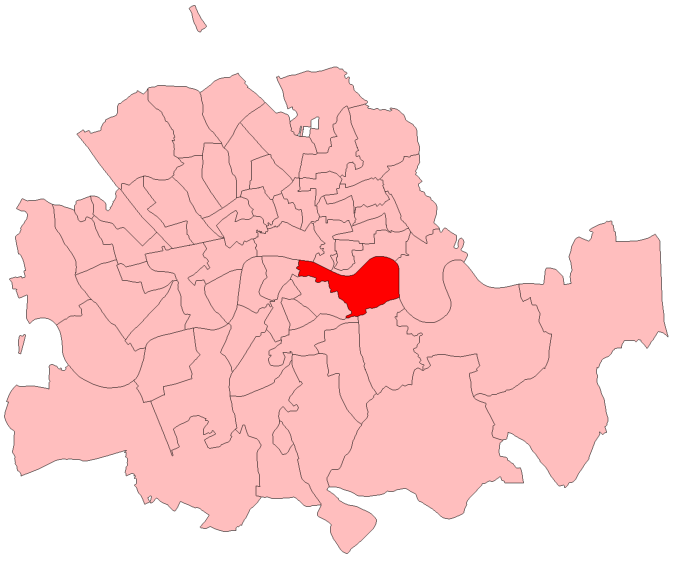
- Rotherhithe in London 1885–1918

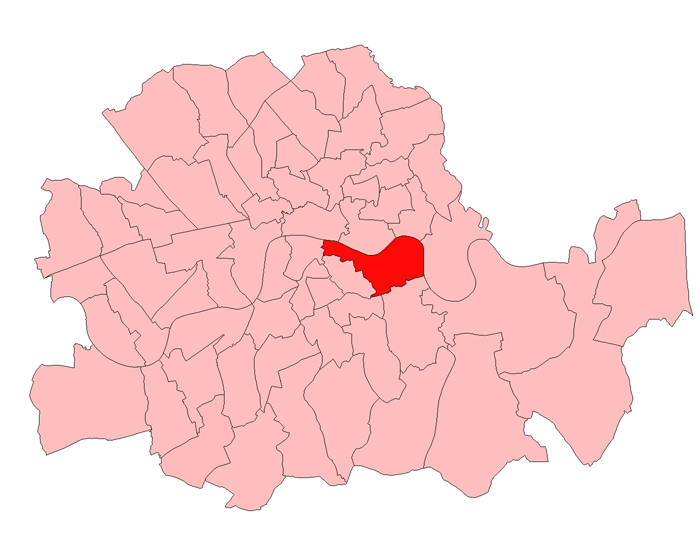
- Rotherhithe in London 1918–50

1885–1950
- Seats: one
- Created from: Southwark
- Replaced by: Bermondsey

Rotherhithe was a parliamentary constituency centred on the Rotherhithe district of South London. It returned one Member of Parliament (MP) to the House of Commons of the Parliament of the United Kingdom, elected by the first past the post system.

The constituency was created for the 1885 general election, and abolished for the 1950 general election when it became part of the revived Bermondsey constituency after the London Blitz had destroyed much of the housing and substantially reduced the resident population and electorate.

== Boundaries ==
=== 1885–1918 ===

The Metropolitan Borough of Bermondsey wards of St Olave's, St John's, St Thomas's, St Mary, Rotherhithe and St Mary Magdalen, Bermondsey.

=== 1918–1950 ===
The Metropolitan Borough of Bermondsey wards of St John, St Olave, Bermondsey five and six, and Rotherhithe one, two and three.

== Members of Parliament ==
Election	Member	Party
1885	Charles Hamilton	Conservative
1892	John Macdona	Conservative
1906	Hubert Carr-Gomm	Liberal
1918	John Lort-Williams	Unionist
1923	Ben Smith	Labour
1931	Norah Runge	Conservative
1935	Ben Smith	Labour
1946 b-e	Bob Mellish	Labour
1950	constituency abolished	

== Election results ==
Decades:	1880s; 1890s; 1900s; 1910s; 1820s; 1930s; 1940s

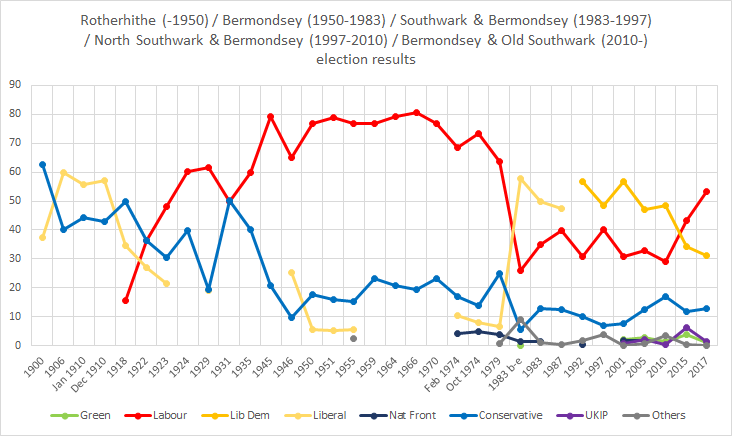
Bermondsey historical election results

=== Elections in the 1880s ===
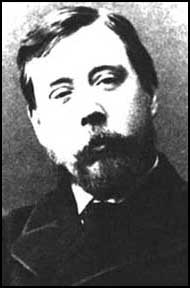
Pankhurst

General election 1885: Rotherhithe
Party	Candidate	Votes	%	±%
Conservative	Charles Hamilton	3,327	54.3	
Lib-Lab	Richard Pankhurst	2,800	45.7	
Majority		527	8.6	
Turnout		6,127	72.5	
Registered electors		8,455		
Conservative win (new seat)				

General election 1886: Rotherhithe
Party	Candidate	Votes	%	±%
Conservative	Charles Hamilton	3,202	60.2	+5.9
Liberal	William Brampton Gurdon	2,115	39.8	−5.9
Majority		1,087	20.4	+11.8
Turnout		5,317	62.9	−9.6
Registered electors		8,455		
Conservative hold		Swing	+5.9	

=== Elections in the 1890s ===
Glanville

General election 1892: Rotherhithe
Party	Candidate	Votes	%	±%
Conservative	John Macdona	3,995	59.1	−1.1
Liberal	Harold Glanville	2,765	40.9	+1.1
Majority		1,230	18.2	−2.2
Turnout		6,760	70.1	+7.2
Registered electors		9,638		
Conservative hold		Swing	-1.1	

General election 1895: Rotherhithe
Party	Candidate	Votes	%	±%
Conservative	John Macdona	4,092	64.6	+5.5
Liberal	Ambrose Pomeroy	2,246	35.4	−5.5
Majority		1,846	29.2	+11.0
Turnout		6,338	69.0	−1.1
Registered electors		9,188		
Conservative hold		Swing	+5.5	

=== Elections in the 1900s ===
Hart-Davies

General election 1900: Rotherhithe
Party	Candidate	Votes	%	±%
Conservative	John Macdona	3,938	62.6	−2.0
Liberal	Thomas Hart-Davies	2,356	37.4	+2.0
Majority		1,582	25.2	−4.0
Turnout		6,294	65.8	−3.2
Registered electors		9,559		
Conservative hold		Swing	-2.0	

Carr-Gomm

General election 1906: Rotherhithe
Party	Candidate	Votes	%	±%
Liberal	Hubert Carr-Gomm	4,192	59.8	+22.4
Conservative	John Macdona	2,821	40.2	−22.4
Majority		1,371	19.6	N/A
Turnout		7,013	80.6	+14.8
Registered electors		8,700		
Liberal gain from Conservative		Swing	+22.4	

=== Elections in the 1910s ===
General election January 1910: Rotherhithe
Party	Candidate	Votes	%	±%
Liberal	Hubert Carr-Gomm	4,474	55.6	−4.2
Conservative	Assheton Pownall	3,570	44.4	+4.2
Majority		904	11.2	−8.4
Turnout		8,044	84.3	+3.7
Liberal hold		Swing	-4.2	

General election December 1910: Rotherhithe
Party	Candidate	Votes	%	±%
Liberal	Hubert Carr-Gomm	4,030	57.1	+1.5
Conservative	Assheton Pownall	3,026	42.9	−1.5
Majority		1,004	14.2	+3.0
Turnout		7,056	74.0	−10.3
Liberal hold		Swing	+1.5	

General Election 1914–15:

Another General Election was required to take place before the end of 1915. The political parties had been making preparations for an election to take place and by July 1914, the following candidates had been selected;

- Liberal: Hubert Carr-Gomm
- Unionist:

General election 1918: Rotherhithe
Party		Candidate	Votes	%	±%
C	Unionist	John Lort-Williams	5,639	50.0	+7.1
	Liberal	Hubert Carr-Gomm	3,889	34.5	−22.6
	Labour	Will Godfrey	1,750	15.5	New
Majority			1,750	15.5	N/A
Turnout			11,258	45.1	−28.9
	Unionist gain from Liberal		Swing	+14.8	
C indicates candidate endorsed by the coalition government.

=== Election in the 1920s ===
General election 1922: Rotherhithe
Party	Candidate	Votes	%	±%
Unionist	John Lort-Williams	6,749	36.5	−13.5
Labour	Charles Diamond	6,703	36.3	+21.8
Liberal	Hubert Carr-Gomm	5,034	27.2	−7.3
Majority		46	0.2	−15.3
Turnout		18,486	63.4	+18.3
Unionist hold		Swing	-17.6	

Hazleton

General election 1923: Rotherhithe
Party	Candidate	Votes	%	±%
Labour	Ben Smith	9,019	48.0	+11.7
Unionist	John Lort-Williams	5,741	30.5	−6.0
Liberal	Richard Hazleton	4,035	21.5	−5.7
Majority		3,278	17.5	N/A
Turnout		18,795	63.8	+0.4
Labour gain from Unionist		Swing	+8.8	

General election 1924: Rotherhithe
Party	Candidate	Votes	%	±%
Labour	Ben Smith	12,703	60.3	+12.3
Unionist	Charles Garfield Lott Du Cann	8,375	39.7	+9.2
Majority		4,328	20.6	+3.1
Turnout		21,078	70.5	+6.7
Labour hold		Swing	+1.5	

General election 1929: Rotherhithe
Party	Candidate	Votes	%	±%
Labour	Ben Smith	14,664	61.6	+1.3
Unionist	Gurney Braithwaite	4,594	19.3	−20.4
Liberal	Dora West	4,556	19.1	New
Majority		10,070	42.3	+21.7
Turnout		23,814	65.9	−0.6
Labour hold		Swing	+10.8	

=== Election in the 1930s ===
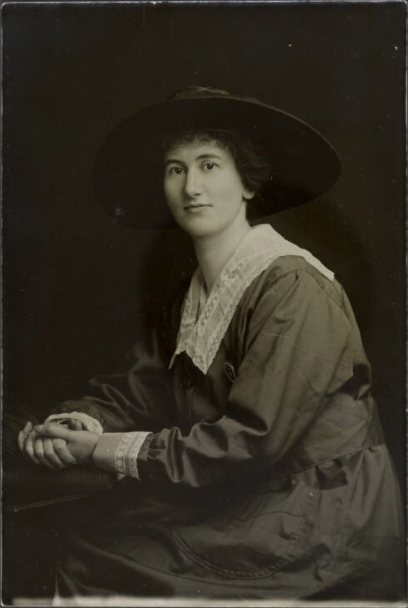
Runge

General election 1931: Rotherhithe
Party	Candidate	Votes	%	±%
Conservative	Norah Runge	11,666	50.3	+31.0
Labour	Ben Smith	11,536	49.7	−11.9
Majority		130	0.6	N/A
Turnout		23,202	64.3	−1.6
Conservative gain from Labour		Swing	+21.4	

General election 1935: Rotherhithe
Party	Candidate	Votes	%	±%
Labour	Ben Smith	14,416	59.7	+10.0
Conservative	Norah Runge	9,751	40.3	−10.0
Majority		4,665	19.4	N/A
Turnout		24,167	71.3	+7.0
Labour gain from Conservative		Swing	+10.0	

=== Election in the 1940s ===
General election 1945: Rotherhithe
Party	Candidate	Votes	%	±%
Labour	Ben Smith	9,741	79.1	+19.4
Conservative	Norah Runge	2,577	20.9	−19.4
Majority		7,164	58.2	+38.8
Turnout		12,318	68.1	−3.2
Labour hold		Swing	+19.4	

1946 Rotherhithe by-election
Party	Candidate	Votes	%	±%
Labour	Bob Mellish	7,265	65.0	−14.1
Liberal	Edward Martell	2,821	25.3	New
Conservative	Frederick Burden	1,084	9.7	−11.2
Majority		4,444	39.7	−18.5
Turnout		11,170	50.9	−17.2
Labour hold				

== In fiction ==
The constituency is portrayed in an episode (A Place in the World) of TV drama series Upstairs, Downstairs as the safe Docklands Labour seat of "Rotherhithe East" that is unsuccessfully contested by James Bellamy for the Conservatives in a by-election in 1920. Location scenes were actually shot in Rotherhithe in January 1975 during the making of the episode. (In real life through 1920 Rotherhithe was a Unionist seat.)
