= 1946 Rotherhithe by-election =

UK Parliamentary by-election

The 1946 Rotherhithe by-election was held on 19 November 1946. The by-election was held after the incumbent Labour MP, Sir Benjamin Smith became the chairman of the West Midlands Coal Board. It was won by the Labour candidate Bob Mellish. London County Councillor Edward Martell beat the Conservative candidate, the future Gillingham MP Frederick Burden, into third place, polling more than one-quarter of the vote.

Rotherhithe by-election, 1946
| Party | Candidate | Votes | % | ±% |
|---|---|---|---|---|
| Labour | Bob Mellish | 7,265 | 65.0 | −14.1 |
| Liberal | Edward Martell | 2,821 | 25.3 | New |
| Conservative | Frederick Burden | 1,084 | 9.7 | −11.2 |
| Majority | | 4,444 | 39.7 | −18.5 |
| Turnout | | 11,170 | 50.9 | −17.2 |
| Labour hold | | Swing | | |
