= John Macdona =

British politician (1836- 1907)

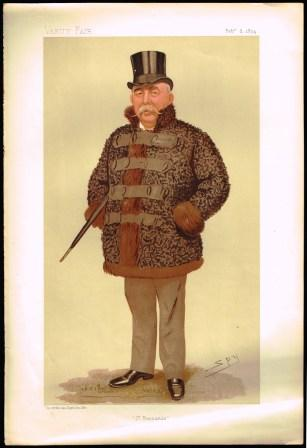
- Vanity Fair drawing by Leslie Ward, 1894
- Born: 1836
- Died: 4 May 1907 (aged 70–71)
- Education: Trinty College
- Occupations: Pastor, politician

John Cumming Macdona (1836 – 4 May 1907) was a British cleric, barrister, and Conservative MP for Rotherhithe.

Educated at Trinity College, Dublin, he was ordained in the Church of England and was Rector of Cheadle, Cheshire until 1873. He was subsequently a vicar in Sefton, Liverpool. He later gave up the clerical life for a career as a politician and barrister, being called to the bar by the Middle Temple in 1889.

He was elected for Rotherhithe as a Conservative in 1892, held the seat in 1895 and 1900, but lost it to the Liberals in the landslide of 1906.

He was also a breeder of St. Bernard dogs and was President of the Kennel Club.

== Sources ==
- Craig, F.W.S. British Parliamentary Election Results 1885-1918
- Whitaker's Almanack, 1893 to 1910 editions
- Leigh Rayment's Historical List of MPs
- Some portraits
