= Hampstead (London County Council constituency) =

London County Council constituency

- Former constituency for the London County Council

Former constituency
- Created: 1889
- Abolished: 1965
- Members: 2 (to 1949); 3 (from 1949)

Hampstead was a constituency used for elections to the London County Council between 1889 and the council's abolition, in 1965. The seat shared boundaries with the UK Parliament constituency of the same name.

== Councillors ==
Year	Name	Party	Name	Party	Name	Party
1889	John Fletcher	Moderate	Henry Harben	Moderate	Two seats until 1949	
1895	John Fletcher	Moderate	Edward Bond	Moderate	Two seats until 1949	
1901	John Fletcher	Moderate	William Edward Mullins	Progressive	Two seats until 1949	
1904	Nicholas Hanhart	Conservative	John Thomas Taylor	Conservative	Two seats until 1949	
1907	Walter Reynolds	Municipal Reform	John Thomas Taylor	Conservative	Two seats until 1949	
1908	Walter Reynolds	Municipal Reform	Andrew Taylor	Municipal Reform	Two seats until 1949	
1926	Walter Reynolds	Municipal Reform	Frank Geere Howard	Municipal Reform	Two seats until 1949	
1931	William Steer	Municipal Reform	Frank Geere Howard	Municipal Reform	Two seats until 1949	
1934	William Steer	Municipal Reform	Sydney Copeman	Municipal Reform	Two seats until 1949	
1945	William Steer	Municipal Reform	John Fremantle	Conservative	Two seats until 1949	
1949	William Steer	Municipal Reform	John Fremantle	Conservative	Geoffrey Hutchinson	Conservative
1952	Doris Bailey	Conservative	John Fremantle	Conservative	Randolph Cleaver	Conservative
1955	Francis Bennett	Conservative	Lena Townsend	Conservative	Randolph Cleaver	Conservative

== Election results ==
1889 London County Council election: Hampstead
Party	Candidate	Votes	%	±%
Moderate	John Fletcher	1,730		
Moderate	Henry Harben	1,630		
Progressive	E. K. Blyth	905		
Progressive	Thomas Birch	364		
Moderate win (new seat)				
Moderate win (new seat)				

1892 London County Council election: Hampstead
Party	Candidate	Votes	%	±%
Moderate	John Fletcher	Unopposed	N/A	
Moderate	Henry Harben	Unopposed	N/A	
Moderate hold		Swing		
Moderate hold		Swing		

1895 London County Council election: Hampstead
Party	Candidate	Votes	%	±%
Moderate	John Fletcher	2,439		
Moderate	Edward Bond	2,282		
Progressive	J. W. Greig	1,447		
Moderate hold		Swing		
Moderate hold		Swing		

1898 London County Council election: Hampstead
Party	Candidate	Votes	%	±%
Moderate	John Fletcher	2,344		
Moderate	Edward Bond	2,277		
Progressive	F. Debenham	1,878		
Progressive	H. Wilberforce	1,873		
Moderate hold		Swing		
Moderate hold		Swing		

1901 London County Council election: Hampstead
Party	Candidate	Votes	%	±%
Conservative	John Fletcher	2,476	37.7	+1.6
Progressive	William Edward Mullins	2,231	34.0	+5.1
Conservative	Edward Bond	1,864	28.4	−6.6
Conservative hold		Swing		
Progressive gain from Conservative		Swing		

1904 London County Council election: Hampstead
Party	Candidate	Votes	%	±%
Conservative	Nicholas Hanhart	3,252		
Conservative	John Thomas Taylor	3,213		
Progressive	William Edward Mullins	2,893		
Progressive	C. H. Smith	2,737		
Majority				
Conservative gain from Progressive		Swing		
Conservative hold		Swing		

1907 London County Council election: Hampstead
Party	Candidate	Votes	%	±%
Municipal Reform	John Thomas Taylor	5,577		
Municipal Reform	Walter Reynolds	5,508		
Progressive	G. L. Bruce	2,894		
Progressive	C. A. McCurdy	2,878		
Majority				
Municipal Reform hold		Swing		
Municipal Reform hold		Swing		

1910 London County Council election: Hampstead
Party	Candidate	Votes	%	±%
Municipal Reform	Andrew Taylor	4,527	39.5	
Municipal Reform	Walter Reynolds	4,509	39.3	
Progressive	Alexander Jones David	2,431	21.2	
Majority				
Municipal Reform hold		Swing		
Municipal Reform hold		Swing		

1913 London County Council election: Hampstead
Party	Candidate	Votes	%	±%
Municipal Reform	Walter Reynolds	4,567	40.5	+1.0
Municipal Reform	Andrew Taylor	4,529	40.2	+0.9
Progressive	Henry Holman	2,169	19.3	−1.9
Majority		2,360	20.9	+2.8
Municipal Reform hold		Swing	+1.0	
Municipal Reform hold		Swing		

1919 London County Council election: Hampstead
Party	Candidate	Votes	%	±%
Municipal Reform	Andrew Taylor	3,378		
Municipal Reform	Walter Reynolds	3,289		
Labour	Skene Mackay	1,352		
Labour	Arthur Duncan-Jones	1,286		
Majority		1,937		
Municipal Reform hold		Swing		
Municipal Reform hold		Swing		

1922 London County Council election: Hampstead
Party	Candidate	Votes	%	±%
Municipal Reform	Andrew Taylor	10,572		
Municipal Reform	Walter Reynolds	10,565		
Labour	E. E. Balfour	2,390		
Labour	J. May	2,390		
Majority				
Municipal Reform hold		Swing		
Municipal Reform hold		Swing		

1925 London County Council election: Hampstead
Party	Candidate	Votes	%	±%
Municipal Reform	Andrew Taylor	7,015		
Municipal Reform	Walter Reynolds	6,953		
Labour	Skene Mackay	1,826		
Majority				
Municipal Reform hold		Swing		
Municipal Reform hold		Swing		

1928 London County Council election: Hampstead
Party	Candidate	Votes	%	±%
Municipal Reform	Walter Reynolds	6,481		
Municipal Reform	Frank Geere Howard	6,458		
Liberal	William Lloyd Taylor	2,432		
Liberal	Ida Frances Homfray	2,331		
Majority				
Municipal Reform hold		Swing		
Municipal Reform hold		Swing		

1931 London County Council election: Hampstead
Party	Candidate	Votes	%	±%
Municipal Reform	Frank Geere Howard	7,935		
Municipal Reform	William Steer	7,663		
Liberal	Ida Frances Homfray	1,160		
Liberal	A. Vinter	1,058		
Majority				
Municipal Reform hold		Swing		
Municipal Reform hold		Swing		

1934 London County Council election: Hampstead
Party	Candidate	Votes	%	±%
Municipal Reform	Sydney Copeman	8,246		
Municipal Reform	William Steer	8,164		
Labour	H. Smith	2,153		
Labour	F. L. Kerran	2,067		
Majority				
Municipal Reform hold		Swing		
Municipal Reform hold		Swing		

1937 London County Council election: Hampstead
Party	Candidate	Votes	%	±%
Municipal Reform	Sydney Copeman	10,244		
Municipal Reform	William Steer	10,196		
Labour	W. H. Morris	4,655		
Labour	J. L. Brewer	4,637		
Majority				
Municipal Reform hold		Swing		
Municipal Reform hold		Swing		

1946 London County Council election: Hampstead
Party	Candidate	Votes	%	±%
Conservative	John Fremantle	11,430		
Conservative	William Steer	11,395		
Labour	Florence Cayford	8,473		
Labour	J. L. Copeland	8,385		
Majority				
Conservative hold		Swing		
Conservative hold		Swing		

1949 London County Council election: Hampstead
Party	Candidate	Votes	%	±%
Conservative	Geoffrey Hutchinson	21,451		
Conservative	John Fremantle	21,155		
Conservative	William Steer	21,134		
Labour	M. Goldhill	10,249		
Labour	Mary Ormerod	10,217		
Labour	Beatrice Serota	10,005		
Conservative win (new seat)				
Conservative hold		Swing		
Conservative hold		Swing		

1952 London County Council election: Hampstead
Party	Candidate	Votes	%	±%
Conservative	Randolph Cleaver	19,227		
Conservative	John Fremantle	19,127		
Conservative	Doris Bailey	19,047		
Labour	Arthur Richardson	11,959		
Labour	Beatrice Serota	11,458		
Labour	A. E. Skinner	11,187		
Independent	A. R. Enfield	1,146		
Conservative hold		Swing		
Conservative hold		Swing		
Conservative hold		Swing		

1955 London County Council election: Hampstead
Party	Candidate	Votes	%	±%
Conservative	Francis Bennett	15,656		
Conservative	Randolph Cleaver	15,503		
Conservative	Lena Townsend	15,401		
Labour	T. Chapman	8,120		
Labour	Arthur Richardson	7,953		
Labour	R. E. Shaw	7,706		
Liberal	David Sacker	1,364		
Liberal	Elizabeth Barling	1,341		
Liberal	C. Grey	1,280		
Independent	A. R. Enfield	461		
Conservative hold		Swing		
Conservative hold		Swing		
Conservative hold		Swing		

1958 London County Council election: Hampstead
Party	Candidate	Votes	%	±%
Conservative	Francis Bennett	11,421		
Conservative	Lena Townsend	11,395		
Conservative	Randolph Cleaver	11,286		
Labour	A. E. Skinner	9,839		
Labour	L. Evans	9,602		
Labour	Ernest Wistrich	9,570		
Liberal	Christopher Frere-Smith	4,319		
Liberal	Elizabeth Barling	4,285		
Liberal	David Sacker	4,227		
Conservative hold		Swing		
Conservative hold		Swing		
Conservative hold		Swing		

1961 London County Council election: Hampstead
Party	Candidate	Votes	%	±%
Conservative	Francis Bennett	12,208		
Conservative	Lena Townsend	11,843		
Conservative	Randolph Cleaver	11,805		
Labour	A. E. Skinner	8,064		
Labour	V. A. Bonafont	8,013		
Labour	L. Evans	7,862		
Liberal	Renee Soskin	4,149		
Liberal	A. J. Allen	4,065		
Liberal	M. Darvall	4,041		
Conservative hold		Swing		
Conservative hold		Swing		
Conservative hold		Swing		
