= Brixton (London County Council constituency) =

London County Council constituency (1889–1965)

- Former constituency for the London County Council

Former constituency
- Created: 1889; 137 years ago
- Abolished: 1965; 61 years ago
- Members: 2 (to 1949); 3 (from 1949)

Brixton was a constituency used for elections to the London County Council between 1889 and the council's abolition, in 1965. The seat shared boundaries with the UK Parliament constituency of the same name.

== Councillors ==
| Year | Name | Party | Name | Party | Name | Party |
|---|---|---|---|---|---|---|
| 1889 | Edmund Verney | Progressive | Charles Thompson Beresford-Hope | Moderate | Two seats until 1949 | |
| 1892 | Henry Harris | Progressive | Stephen Seaward Tayler | Progressive | Two seats until 1949 | |
| 1895 | William Haydon | Moderate | Charles Jerome | Moderate | Two seats until 1949 | |
| 1901 | Frederick Dolman | Progressive | Lewen Sharp | Progressive | Two seats until 1949 | |
| 1907 | William Haydon | Municipal Reform | Samuel Hoare | Municipal Reform | Two seats until 1949 | |
| 1910 | William Haydon | Municipal Reform | Ernest Gray | Municipal Reform | Two seats until 1949 | |
| 1919 | Charles Henry Gibbs | Municipal Reform | Ernest Gray | Municipal Reform | Two seats until 1949 | |
| 1922 | Gervas Pierrepont | Municipal Reform | Ernest Gray | Municipal Reform | Two seats until 1949 | |
| 1925 | Gervas Pierrepont | Municipal Reform | Nigel Colman | Municipal Reform | Two seats until 1949 | |
| 1928 | Gervas Pierrepont | Municipal Reform | Barrie Lambert | Municipal Reform | Two seats until 1949 | |
| 1931 | Gervas Pierrepont | Municipal Reform | Charles Kingston | Municipal Reform | Two seats until 1949 | |
| 1934 | Gervas Pierrepont | Municipal Reform | Barbara Hornby | Municipal Reform | Two seats until 1949 | |
| 1946 | Walter Boys | Labour | Victor Mishcon | Labour | Two seats until 1949 | |
| 1949 | Walter Boys | Labour | Victor Mishcon | Labour | Donald Ford | Labour |
| 1954 | Beatrice Serota | Labour | Victor Mishcon | Labour | Donald Ford | Labour |
| 1961 | Beatrice Serota | Labour | Victor Mishcon | Labour | Nathan Marock | Labour |

== Election results ==
1889 London County Council election: Brixton
| Party | Candidate | Votes | % | ±% |
|---|---|---|---|---|
| Progressive | Sir Edmund Verney | 2,112 | | |
| Progressive | Margaret Mansfield | 1,986 | | |
| Moderate | Charles Thompson Beresford-Hope | 1,686 | | |
| Moderate | H. Smallman | 1,397 | | |
| Progressive win (new seat) | | | | |
| Moderate win (new seat) | | | | |

1892 London County Council election: Brixton
| Party | Candidate | Votes | % | ±% |
|---|---|---|---|---|
| Progressive | Henry Harris | 2,821 | | |
| Progressive | Stephen Seaward Tayler | 2,768 | | |
| Moderate | Charles Thompson Beresford-Hope | 2,241 | | |
| Moderate | Charles Jerome | 2,160 | | |
| Independent | J. E. S. King | 97 | | |
| Progressive gain from Moderate | | Swing | | |
| Progressive hold | | Swing | | |

1895 London County Council election: Brixton
| Party | Candidate | Votes | % | ±% |
|---|---|---|---|---|
| Moderate | William Haydon | 3,149 | | |
| Moderate | Charles Jerome | 3,075 | | |
| Progressive | F. W. Buxton | 2,226 | | |
| Progressive | C. G. Clarke | 2,195 | | |
| Moderate gain from Progressive | | Swing | | |
| Moderate gain from Progressive | | Swing | | |

1898 London County Council election: Brixton
| Party | Candidate | Votes | % | ±% |
|---|---|---|---|---|
| Moderate | William Haydon | 2,944 | | |
| Moderate | Charles Jerome | 2,863 | | |
| Progressive | John William Horsley | 2,339 | | |
| Progressive | Spencer Barclay Heward | 2,323 | | |
| Moderate hold | | Swing | | |
| Moderate hold | | Swing | | |

1901 London County Council election: Brixton
| Party | Candidate | Votes | % | ±% |
|---|---|---|---|---|
| Progressive | Frederick Dolman | 3,244 | 30.1 | +5.7 |
| Progressive | Lewen Sharp | 3,226 | 29.9 | +5.6 |
| Conservative | William Bell | 2,180 | 20.2 | −1.1 |
| Conservative | Charles Jerome | 2,138 | 19.8 | −10.1 |
| Progressive gain from Conservative | | Swing | | |
| Progressive gain from Conservative | | Swing | +5.6 | |

1904 London County Council election: Brixton
| Party | Candidate | Votes | % | ±% |
|---|---|---|---|---|
| Progressive | Lewen Sharp | 3,170 | | |
| Progressive | Frederick Dolman | 3,120 | | |
| Conservative | W. Haydon | 2,022 | | |
| Conservative | S. Cresswell | 2,911 | | |
| Progressive hold | | Swing | | |
| Progressive hold | | Swing | | |

1907 London County Council election: Brixton
| Party | Candidate | Votes | % | ±% |
|---|---|---|---|---|
| Municipal Reform | William Haydon | 4,997 | | |
| Municipal Reform | Samuel Hoare | 4,295 | | |
| Progressive | Lewen Sharp | 3,546 | | |
| Progressive | L. Earle | 3,525 | | |
| Majority | | | | |
| Progressive gain from Municipal Reform | | Swing | | |
| Progressive gain from Municipal Reform | | Swing | | |

1910 London County Council election: Brixton
| Party | Candidate | Votes | % | ±% |
|---|---|---|---|---|
| Municipal Reform | William Haydon | 4,324 | | |
| Municipal Reform | Ernest Gray | 4,295 | | |
| Progressive | M. B. Lange | 3,188 | | |
| Progressive | George Shrubsall | 3,186 | | |
| Majority | | | | |
| Municipal Reform hold | | Swing | | |
| Municipal Reform hold | | Swing | | |

1913 London County Council election: Brixton
| Party | Candidate | Votes | % | ±% |
|---|---|---|---|---|
| Municipal Reform | William Haydon | 4,289 | 28.8 | −0.0 |
| Municipal Reform | Ernest Gray | 4,274 | 28.7 | +0.1 |
| Progressive | A. R. Gridley | 3,154 | 21.2 | −0.1 |
| Progressive | Hillier Holt | 3,151 | 21.2 | −0.0 |
| Majority | | 1,120 | 7.5 | |
| Municipal Reform hold | | Swing | 0.0 | |
| Municipal Reform hold | | Swing | +0.5 | |

1919 London County Council election: Brixton
| Party | Candidate | Votes | % | ±% |
|---|---|---|---|---|
| Municipal Reform | Charles Henry Gibbs | 2,159 | 32.0 | |
| Municipal Reform | Ernest Gray | 2,102 | 31.2 | |
| Labour | Horace Herbert Tavender | 1,261 | 18.7 | |
| Labour | W. Burroughs | 1,216 | 18.1 | |
| Majority | | 841 | 12.5 | |
| Municipal Reform hold | | Swing | | |
| Municipal Reform hold | | Swing | | |

1922 London County Council election: Brixton
| Party | Candidate | Votes | % | ±% |
|---|---|---|---|---|
| Municipal Reform | Ernest Gray | 8,260 | 35.5 | +4.3 |
| Municipal Reform | Gervas Pierrepont | 8,149 | 35.0 | +3.0 |
| Labour | W. I. G. Scott | 3,455 | 14.8 | −3.9 |
| Labour | Henry Devenish Harben | 3,423 | 14.7 | −3.4 |
| Majority | | 4,694 | 20.2 | +7.7 |
| Municipal Reform hold | | Swing | | |
| Municipal Reform hold | | Swing | | |

1925 London County Council election: Brixton
| Party | Candidate | Votes | % | ±% |
|---|---|---|---|---|
| Municipal Reform | Gervas Pierrepont | 5,935 | | |
| Municipal Reform | Nigel Colman | 5,817 | | |
| Labour | James Adams | 2,784 | | |
| Labour | Amy Sayle | 2,029 | | − |
| Majority | | | | |
| Municipal Reform hold | | Swing | | |
| Municipal Reform hold | | Swing | | |

1928 London County Council election: Brixton
| Party | Candidate | Votes | % | ±% |
|---|---|---|---|---|
| Municipal Reform | Gervas Pierrepont | 4,371 | | |
| Municipal Reform | Barrie Lambert | 4,340 | | |
| Liberal | P. H. Chase | 2,123 | | |
| Liberal | G. W. Nash | 2,112 | | − |
| Majority | | | | |
| Municipal Reform hold | | Swing | | |
| Municipal Reform hold | | Swing | | |

1931 London County Council election: Brixton
| Party | Candidate | Votes | % | ±% |
|---|---|---|---|---|
| Municipal Reform | Gervas Pierrepont | 5,392 | | |
| Municipal Reform | Charles Kingston | 5,320 | | |
| Labour | E. J. Titler | 2,073 | | |
| Labour | A. Hindell | 1,979 | | |
| Liberal | Arthur Stanley Quick | 1,088 | | |
| Liberal | Ursula Warren | 1,070 | | − |
| Majority | | | | |
| Municipal Reform hold | | Swing | | |
| Municipal Reform hold | | Swing | | |

1934 London County Council election: Brixton
| Party | Candidate | Votes | % | ±% |
|---|---|---|---|---|
| Municipal Reform | Gervas Pierrepont | 5,107 | | |
| Municipal Reform | Barbara Hornby | 4,940 | | |
| Labour | B. Fraser | 4,485 | | |
| Labour | F. E. Brown | 4,455 | | |
| Majority | | | | |
| Municipal Reform hold | | Swing | | |
| Municipal Reform hold | | Swing | | |

1937 London County Council election: Brixton
| Party | Candidate | Votes | % | ±% |
|---|---|---|---|---|
| Municipal Reform | Barbara Hornby | 8,018 | | |
| Municipal Reform | Gervas Pierrepont | 7,956 | | |
| Labour | Gavin Henderson | 6,945 | | |
| Labour | C. Johnson | 6,695 | | |
| Majority | | | | |
| Municipal Reform hold | | Swing | | |
| Municipal Reform hold | | Swing | | |

1946 London County Council election: Brixton
| Party | Candidate | Votes | % | ±% |
|---|---|---|---|---|
| Labour | Walter Boys | 5,955 | | |
| Labour | Victor Mishcon | 5,945 | | |
| Conservative | Barbara Hornby | 3,366 | | |
| Conservative | Gervas Pierrepont | 3,329 | | |
| Majority | | | | |
| Labour gain from Municipal Reform | | Swing | | |
| Labour gain from Municipal Reform | | Swing | | |

1949 London County Council election: Brixton
| Party | Candidate | Votes | % | ±% |
|---|---|---|---|---|
| Labour | Donald Ford | 11,904 | | |
| Labour | Walter Boys | 11,867 | | |
| Labour | Victor Mishcon | 11,859 | | |
| Conservative | F. T. Horne | 11,651 | | |
| Conservative | Lady Williams | 11,462 | | |
| Conservative | W. Shepheard | 11,445 | | |
| Labour hold | | Swing | | |
| Labour hold | | Swing | | |
| Labour win (new seat) | | | | |

1952 London County Council election: Brixton
| Party | Candidate | Votes | % | ±% |
|---|---|---|---|---|
| Labour | Donald Ford | 15,315 | | |
| Labour | Victor Mishcon | 15,169 | | |
| Labour | Walter Boys | 14,912 | | |
| Conservative | W. H. Hall | 8,680 | | |
| Conservative | J. W. Loveridge | 8,655 | | |
| Conservative | M. Rose | 8,542 | | |
| Union Movement | J. F. Dunigan | 758 | | |
| Union Movement | F. E. Lewis | 523 | | |
| Union Movement | J. M. Ryan | 373 | | |
| Labour hold | | Swing | | |
| Labour hold | | Swing | | |
| Labour hold | | Swing | | |

Beatrice Serota was elected unopposed in 1954.

1955 London County Council election: Brixton
| Party | Candidate | Votes | % | ±% |
|---|---|---|---|---|
| Labour | Victor Mishcon | 9,571 | | |
| Labour | Donald Ford | 9,158 | | |
| Labour | Beatrice Serota | 9,073 | | |
| Conservative | N. M. Miskin | 6,103 | | |
| Conservative | B. Knightly | 6,077 | | |
| Conservative | A. G. Morkill | 5,745 | | |
| Union Movement | G. A. Hudson | 307 | | |
| Liberal | M. R. Gidley | 268 | | |
| Union Movement | J. M. Ryan | 262 | | |
| Liberal | Eunice Jones | 251 | | |
| Union Movement | Robert Row | 218 | | |
| Liberal | M. D. E. Smart | 177 | | |
| Labour hold | | Swing | | |
| Labour hold | | Swing | | |
| Labour hold | | Swing | | |

1958 London County Council election: Brixton
| Party | Candidate | Votes | % | ±% |
|---|---|---|---|---|
| Labour | Donald Ford | 10,173 | | |
| Labour | Victor Mishcon | 10,134 | | |
| Labour | Beatrice Serota | 9,627 | | |
| Conservative | J. W. Proctor | 3,742 | | |
| Conservative | J. C. Blofeld | 3,715 | | |
| Conservative | J. Warren | 3,714 | | |
| Labour hold | | Swing | | |
| Labour hold | | Swing | | |
| Labour hold | | Swing | | |

1961 London County Council election: Brixton
| Party | Candidate | Votes | % | ±% |
|---|---|---|---|---|
| Labour | Victor Mishcon | 9,966 | | |
| Labour | Nathan Marock | 9,949 | | |
| Labour | Beatrice Serota | 9,687 | | |
| Conservative | A. J. Warren | 7,566 | | |
| Conservative | K. P. Payne | 7,481 | | |
| Conservative | R. F. Long | 7,193 | | |
| Labour hold | | Swing | | |
| Labour hold | | Swing | | |
| Labour hold | | Swing | | |
