= Kennington (London County Council constituency) =

London County Council constituency

- Former constituency for the London County Council

Former constituency
- Created: 1889
- Abolished: 1949
- Member(s): 2
- Replaced by: Brixton and Vauxhall

Kennington was a constituency used for elections to the London County Council between 1889 and 1949. The seat shared boundaries with the UK Parliament constituency of the same name.

== Councillors ==
Year	Name	Party	Name	Party
1889	Horatio Myer	Progressive	Harry Seymour Foster	Moderate
1892	Richard Cecil Grosvenor	Progressive	William Stockbridge	Progressive
1895	Joseph Dixon	Moderate	Thomas Arthur Organ	Progressive
1898	John Benn	Progressive	Thomas Arthur Organ	Progressive
1901	John Benn	Progressive	Stephen Collins	Progressive
1907	John Benn	Progressive	Edward Denny	Progressive
1910	John Benn	Progressive	Maurice de Forest	Progressive
1913	John Benn	Progressive	William Peel	Municipal Reform
1919	John Benn	Progressive	Harry Gosling	Labour
1922	John Benn	Progressive	Harold Swann	Municipal Reform
1922	Harry Gosling	Labour	Harold Swann	Municipal Reform
1925	George Maurice Beaufoy	Municipal Reform	Harold Swann	Municipal Reform
1928	Charles Gibson	Labour	Harold Swann	Municipal Reform
1931	Henry Studholme	Municipal Reform	Harold Swann	Municipal Reform
1934	Charles Gibson	Labour	Amy Sayle	Labour
1946	Charles Gibson	Labour	Howell John Powell	Labour

== Election results ==
1889 London County Council election: Kennington
Party	Candidate	Votes	%	±%
Progressive	Horatio Myer	2,139		
Moderate	Harry Seymour Foster	1,192		
Independent	Charles William Andrew	1,061		
Progressive	Charles Richard White	918		
Independent	William Stockbridge	211		
Progressive win (new seat)				
Moderate win (new seat)				

1892 London County Council election: Kennington
Party	Candidate	Votes	%	±%
Progressive	William Stockbridge	2,872		
Progressive	Robert Cecil Grosvenor	2,835		
Moderate	F. E. Goodhart	1,580		
Moderate	J. M. Paterson	1,529		
Progressive gain from Moderate		Swing		
Progressive hold		Swing		

1895 London County Council election: Kennington
Party	Candidate	Votes	%	±%
Moderate	Joseph Dixon	2,337		
Progressive	Thomas Arthur Organ	2,313		
Progressive	R. Temple Rennie	2,297		
Moderate	R. Devereux	2,261		
Independent	G. Palmer	144		
Moderate gain from Progressive		Swing		
Progressive hold		Swing		

1898 London County Council election: Kennington
Party	Candidate	Votes	%	±%
Progressive	Thomas Arthur Organ	2,672		
Progressive	John Benn	2,661		
Moderate	Joseph Dixon	2,526		
Moderate	J. R. Cousins	2,471		
Ind. Labour Party	N. P. Palmer	68		
Progressive gain from Moderate		Swing		
Progressive hold		Swing		

1901 London County Council election: Kennington
Party	Candidate	Votes	%	±%
Progressive	John Benn	3,505	32.8	+7.0
Progressive	Stephen Collins	3,412	32.0	+6.1
Conservative	Benjamin William Bennett	1,913	17.9	−6.0
Conservative	Joseph Dixon	1,844	17.3	−7.2
Progressive hold		Swing		
Progressive hold		Swing	+6.6	

1904 London County Council election: Kennington
Party	Candidate	Votes	%	±%
Progressive	Stephen Collins	3,394		
Progressive	John Benn	3,388		
Conservative	Allen Edwards	2,460		
Majority				
Progressive hold		Swing		
Progressive hold		Swing		

1907 London County Council election: Kennington
Party	Candidate	Votes	%	±%
Progressive	John Benn	3,424		
Progressive	Edward Denny	3,326		
Municipal Reform	P. F. Budge	2,718		
Municipal Reform	W. Porter	2,666		
Social Democratic Federation	Joseph George Butler	281		
Social Democratic Federation	Fred Knee	235		
Majority				
Progressive hold		Swing		
Progressive hold		Swing		

1910 London County Council election: Kennington
Party	Candidate	Votes	%	±%
Progressive	John Benn	3,290		
Progressive	Maurice de Forest	2,828		
Municipal Reform	P. F. Budge	2,421		
Municipal Reform	Cecil Ince	2,317		
Labour	John Gilbert Dale	900		
Majority				
Progressive hold		Swing		
Progressive hold		Swing		

1913 London County Council election: Kennington
Party	Candidate	Votes	%	±%
Progressive	Sir John Williams Benn	3,517	24.9	−3.1
Municipal Reform	William Peel	3,371	23.8	+3.2
Municipal Reform	Victor Sassoon	3,264	23.1	+3.4
Progressive	W. J. Richardson	2,878	20.3	−3.8
Labour	John Gilbert Dale	1,121	7.9	+0.2
Municipal Reform gain from Progressive		Swing	+3.5	
Majority		493	3.5	
Progressive hold		Swing	-3.2	
Majority		253	1.8	

1919 London County Council election: Kennington
Party	Candidate	Votes	%	±%
Labour	Harry Gosling	2,764	31.6	
Progressive	John Benn	2,743	31.3	
Municipal Reform	Frederick Benjamin Oliphant Hawes	1,685	19.3	
Municipal Reform	David Margesson	1,558	17.8	
Majority		1,058	12.0	
Progressive hold		Swing		
Labour gain from Municipal Reform		Swing		

1922 London County Council election: Kennington
Party	Candidate	Votes	%	±%
Municipal Reform	Harold Swann	5,728	31.8	+12.5
Progressive	John Benn	4,805	26.7	−4.6
Labour	Harry Gosling	4,275	23.7	−7.9
Labour	Charles Gibson	3,212	17.8	n/a
Majority		530	3.0	−9.0
Municipal Reform gain from Labour		Swing		
Progressive hold		Swing		

Kennington by-election, 1922
Party	Candidate	Votes	%	±%
Labour	Harry Gosling	3,871	42.2	
Municipal Reform	Austin Hudson	3,378	36.9	
Progressive	George Brittain	1,917	20.9	
Majority		493	5.3	
Labour gain from Progressive		Swing		

1925 London County Council election: Kennington
Party	Candidate	Votes	%	±%
Municipal Reform	George Maurice Beaufoy	5,715		
Municipal Reform	Harold Swann	5,564		
Labour	Will Lockyer	4,803		
Labour	Francis Bowie	4,796	17.8	n/a
Majority				
Municipal Reform gain from Progressive		Swing		
Municipal Reform hold		Swing		

1928 London County Council election: Kennington
Party	Candidate	Votes	%	±%
Municipal Reform	Harold Swann	5,153		
Labour	Charles Gibson	5,151		
Municipal Reform	George Maurice Beaufoy	5,139		
Labour	Leonard Matters	5,128		
Majority				
Labour gain from Municipal Reform		Swing		
Municipal Reform hold		Swing		

1931 London County Council election: Kennington
Party	Candidate	Votes	%	±%
Municipal Reform	Harold Swann	4,731		
Municipal Reform	Henry Studholme	4,716		
Labour	Charles Gibson	4,239		
Labour	W. Hunter	4,186		
Majority				
Municipal Reform gain from Labour		Swing		
Municipal Reform hold		Swing		

1934 London County Council election: Kennington
Party	Candidate	Votes	%	±%
Labour	Charles Gibson	5,450		
Labour	Amy Sayle	5,393		
Municipal Reform	Harold Swann	3,950		
Municipal Reform	Henry Studholme	3,940		
Majority				
Labour gain from Municipal Reform		Swing		
Labour gain from Municipal Reform		Swing		

1937 London County Council election: Kennington
Party	Candidate	Votes	%	±%
Labour	Charles Gibson	7,303		
Labour	Amy Sayle	7,245		
Municipal Reform	A. Kennedy	5,324		
Municipal Reform	Ingham Clarke	5,055		
Majority				
Labour hold		Swing		
Labour hold		Swing		

1946 London County Council election: Kennington
Party	Candidate	Votes	%	±%
Labour	Charles Gibson	4,378		
Labour	Howell John Powell	4,343		
Conservative	S. R. Dean	1,502		
Conservative	K. Perona-Wright	1,492		
Majority				
Labour hold		Swing		
Labour hold		Swing		
