= Paddington North (London County Council constituency) =

London County Council constituency

- Former constituency for the London County Council

Former constituency
- Created: 1889
- Abolished: 1965
- Member(s): 2 (to 1949); 3 (from 1949)

Paddington North was a constituency used for elections to the London County Council between 1889 and the council's abolition, in 1965. The seat shared boundaries with the UK Parliament constituency of the same name.

== Councillors ==
Year	Name	Party	Name	Party	Name	Party
1889	Melvill Beachcroft	Moderate	Edward Parker Young	Moderate	Two seats until 1949	
1892	Henry Percy Harris	Moderate	William Urquhart	Moderate	Two seats until 1949	
1901	Melvill Beachcroft	Conservative	John Blackwood	Progressive	Two seats until 1949	
1904	Melvill Beachcroft	Conservative	James Stephens	Conservative	Two seats until 1949	
1907	Walter Guinness	Municipal Reform	Herbert Hunter	Municipal Reform	Two seats until 1949	
1910	Thomas Clarence Edward Goff	Municipal Reform	Herbert Hunter	Municipal Reform	Two seats until 1949	
1913	Herbert Lidiard	Municipal Reform	Herbert Hunter	Municipal Reform	Two seats until 1949	
1922	Thomas Clarence Edward Goff	Municipal Reform	Herbert Hunter	Municipal Reform	Two seats until 1949	
1930	Thomas Clarence Edward Goff	Municipal Reform	Frank Stanley Henwood	Municipal Reform	Two seats until 1949	
1931	Geoffrey FitzClarence	Municipal Reform	Frank Stanley Henwood	Municipal Reform	Two seats until 1949	
1937	Eric Hall	Municipal Reform	Frank Stanley Henwood	Municipal Reform	Two seats until 1949	
1946	George de Swiet	Labour	Xenia Field	Labour	Two seats until 1949	
1949	Ernest Hyatt	Conservative	Mary Proby	Conservative	David Wilkie	Conservative
1952	Edward Avery	Labour	Myfanwy Griffith	Labour	John O'Neill Ryan	Labour
1961	Edward Avery	Labour	Harry Browne	Labour	George Lowe	Labour

== Election results ==
1889 London County Council election: Paddington North
Party	Candidate	Votes	%	±%
Moderate	Melvill Beachcroft	1,779		
Moderate	Edward Parker Young	1,598		
Progressive	George Henry Maberly	1,170		
Progressive	Mark Hayler Judge	1,043		
Moderate win (new seat)				
Moderate win (new seat)				

1892 London County Council election: Paddington North
Party	Candidate	Votes	%	±%
Moderate	William Urquhart	1,860		
Moderate	Henry Percy Harris	1,755		
Progressive	George Henry Maberly	1,665		
Progressive	Samuel Cole	1,584		
Moderate hold		Swing		
Moderate hold		Swing		

1895 London County Council election: Paddington North
Party	Candidate	Votes	%	±%
Moderate	Henry Percy Harris	1,887		
Moderate	William Urquhart	1,872		
Progressive	George Henry Maberly	1,584		
Progressive	J. C. Graham	1,504		
Moderate hold		Swing		
Moderate hold		Swing		

1898 London County Council election: Paddington North
Party	Candidate	Votes	%	±%
Moderate	William Urquhart	2,142		
Moderate	Henry Harris	2,086		
Progressive	A. White	1,842		
Progressive	W. Stevenson	1,816		
Moderate hold		Swing		

1901 London County Council election: Paddington North
Party	Candidate	Votes	%	±%
Conservative	Melvill Beachcroft	1,962	26.0	−1.2
Progressive	John Blackwood	1,916	25.4	+2.0
Conservative	Henry Harris	1,858	24.6	−1.9
Progressive	Walter Richard Warren	1,820	24.1	+1.1
Conservative hold		Swing		
Progressive gain from Conservative		Swing	+1.5	

1904 London County Council election: Paddington North
Party	Candidate	Votes	%	±%
Conservative	Melvill Beachcroft	3,346		
Conservative	James Stephens	3,120		
Progressive	John Blackwood	2,393		
Progressive	J. H. Turner	2,172		
Majority				
Conservative gain from Progressive		Swing		
Conservative hold		Swing		

1907 London County Council election: Paddington North
Party	Candidate	Votes	%	±%
Municipal Reform	Walter Guinness	4,711		
Municipal Reform	Herbert Hunter	4,597		
Progressive	James Fairbank	3,607		
Progressive	G. G. Maberly	3,453		
Majority				
Municipal Reform hold		Swing		

1910 London County Council election: Paddington North
Party	Candidate	Votes	%	±%
Municipal Reform	John Herbert Hunter	4,017		
Municipal Reform	Thomas Clarence Edward Goff	3,965		
Progressive	James Fairbank	3,882		
Progressive	Horace George Holmes	3,732		
Majority				
Municipal Reform hold		Swing		

1913 London County Council election: Paddington North
Party	Candidate	Votes	%	±%
Municipal Reform	John Herbert Hunter	4,561		
Municipal Reform	Herbert Lidiard	4,522		
Progressive	Horace Holmes	3,573		
Progressive	James Scott Duckers	3,485		
Majority		949		
Municipal Reform hold		Swing		
Municipal Reform hold		Swing		

1919 London County Council election: Paddington North
Party	Candidate	Votes	%	±%
Municipal Reform	Herbert Hunter	1,938	28.8	
Municipal Reform	Herbert Lidiard	1,864	27.7	
Labour	Charles Terry Hendin	1,470	21.9	
Labour	Hugh Roberts	1,454	21.6	
Majority		394	5.8	
Municipal Reform hold		Swing		
Municipal Reform hold		Swing		

1922 London County Council election: Paddington North
Party	Candidate	Votes	%	±%
Municipal Reform	Herbert Hunter	7,722	34.5	+5.7
Municipal Reform	Thomas Clarence Edward Goff	7,713	34.5	+6.8
Labour	W. C. Bolton	3,484	15.6	−6.3
Labour	H. P. Lawless	3,456	15.4	−6.2
Majority		4,229	18.9	+13.1
Municipal Reform hold		Swing		
Municipal Reform hold		Swing		

1925 London County Council election: Paddington North
Party	Candidate	Votes	%	±%
Municipal Reform	Thomas Clarence Edward Goff	5,612		
Municipal Reform	Herbert Hunter	5,607		
Labour	Terry Hendin	2,694		
Labour	L. G. Paul	2,690		
Majority				
Municipal Reform hold		Swing		
Municipal Reform hold		Swing		

1928 London County Council election: Paddington North
Party	Candidate	Votes	%	±%
Municipal Reform	John Herbert Hunter	5,812		
Municipal Reform	Thomas Clarence Edward Goff	5,743		
Labour	Walter Day	4,491		
Labour	Charles Terry Hendin	4,421		
Liberal	John Bethell Sackville-Evans	1,548		
Liberal	Simeon Gilbert	1,533		
Majority				
Municipal Reform hold		Swing		
Municipal Reform hold		Swing		

Paddington North by-election, 1930
Party	Candidate	Votes	%	±%
Municipal Reform	Frank Stanley Henwood	4,327		
Labour	Terry Hendin	3,209		
Majority				
Municipal Reform hold		Swing		

1931 London County Council election: Paddington North
Party	Candidate	Votes	%	±%
Municipal Reform	Frank Stanley Henwood	6,197		
Municipal Reform	Geoffrey FitzClarence	6,138		
Labour	Richard Coppock	3,414		
Labour	Ewart Culpin	3,374		
Majority				
Municipal Reform hold		Swing		
Municipal Reform hold		Swing		

1934 London County Council election: Paddington North
Party	Candidate	Votes	%	±%
Municipal Reform	Frank Stanley Henwood	5,949		
Municipal Reform	Geoffrey FitzClarence	5,948		
Labour	Barbara Ayrton-Gould	4,261		
Labour	Harry Samuels	4,212		
Communist	A. G. Barker	393		
Communist	H. Smith	328		
Majority				
Municipal Reform hold		Swing		
Municipal Reform hold		Swing		

1937 London County Council election: Paddington North
Party	Candidate	Votes	%	±%
Municipal Reform	Frank Stanley Henwood	7,272		
Municipal Reform	Eric Hall	7,109		
Labour	G. Cann	6,687		
Labour	E. A. Whitfield	6,510		
Majority				
Municipal Reform hold		Swing		
Municipal Reform hold		Swing		

1946 London County Council election: Paddington North
Party	Candidate	Votes	%	±%
Labour	George de Swiet	5,185		
Labour	Xenia Field	5,175		
Conservative	D. Webster	3,690		
Conservative	A. R. Moore	3,673		
Majority				
Labour gain from Conservative		Swing		
Labour gain from Conservative		Swing		

1949 London County Council election: Paddington North
Party	Candidate	Votes	%	±%
Conservative	Ernest Hyatt	9,409		
Conservative	David Wilkie	9,328		
Conservative	Mary Proby	9,208		
Labour	Xenia Field	8,971		
Labour	Edward Avery	8,839		
Labour	Frances Grimmett	8,605		
Conservative win (new seat)				
Conservative gain from Labour		Swing		
Conservative gain from Labour		Swing		

1952 London County Council election: Paddington North
Party	Candidate	Votes	%	±%
Labour	Myfanwy Griffith	13,174		
Labour	Edward Avery	13,109		
Labour	John O'Neill Ryan	12,713		
Conservative	Ernest Hyatt	9,913		
Conservative	Joan Vickers	9,318		
Conservative	David Wilkie	9,214		
Labour gain from Conservative		Swing		
Labour gain from Conservative		Swing		
Labour gain from Conservative		Swing		

1955 London County Council election: Paddington North
Party	Candidate	Votes	%	±%
Labour	Myfanwy Griffith	8,889		
Labour	Edward Avery	8,829		
Labour	John O'Neill Ryan	8,782		
Conservative	R. R. Brown	7,185		
Conservative	J. O'Connell	7,043		
Conservative	L. V. West Russell	6,924		
Labour hold		Swing		
Labour hold		Swing		
Labour hold		Swing		

1958 London County Council election: Paddington North
Party	Candidate	Votes	%	±%
Labour	Edward Avery	9,040		
Labour	John O'Neill Ryan	8,949		
Labour	Myfanwy Griffith	8,883		
Conservative	T. P. K. Kemble	4,243		
Conservative	S. T. A. Coren	4,230		
Conservative	J. W. Nuttall	4,219		
Liberal	A. V. Stitt	863		
Liberal	H. Burke	830		
Liberal	C. N. Gilbert	728		
Labour hold		Swing		
Labour hold		Swing		
Labour hold		Swing		

1961 London County Council election: Paddington North
Party	Candidate	Votes	%	±%
Labour	Edward Avery	7,963		
Labour	George Lowe	7,743		
Labour	Harry Browne	7,474		
Conservative	R. Browne	7,159		
Conservative	Harold Sebag-Montefiore	6,343		
Conservative	T. P. K. Kemble	6,057		
Liberal	L. Lever	840		
Liberal	S. Cowan	806		
Liberal	A. Sheldon-Williams	647		
Labour hold		Swing		
Labour hold		Swing		
Labour hold		Swing		
