= Frank Geere Howard =

Conservative politician in London

Frank Geere Howard (3 March 1861 – 14 July 1935) was a Municipal Reform Party politician in the United Kingdom. He was a member of the London County Council from 1926 to 1934.

== Early life ==
Howard was born in Hampstead, London in 1861, the son of George Howard and his wife Emily (née Geere). His father and grandfather, John Tabor Howard, were upholsterers, practising under the name of Howard & Sons Ltd. Howard wound-up the company in 1935, shortly before his death. Howard qualified as a civil engineer in 1879.

== Political career ==
Howard was Mayor of Hampstead Borough Council on three occasions: 1921-22, 1923-24 and 1924-25.

In 1926 there was a casual vacancy for Hampstead on the London County Council following the resignation of Sir Andrew Taylor, and Howard was elected unopposed, as a member of the Municipal Reform Party. He was re-elected in 1928 and 1931. He did not seek re-election in 1934.

In 1921 (the centenary of the death of John Keats) Howard was responsible for the fund-raising activities that allowed Keats' House to be acquired by Hampstead Council. He was one of the original owners of the house in 1921 (then known as Lawn Bank) when it was taken into public ownership. He was also responsible for the acquisition by the London County Council of Kenwood and the Paddock, adding them to the public open spaces of Hampstead Heath.

== Personal life ==
Howard married Feona Mary Duport Wren (1862-1931) (the daughter of the Liberal / Progressive politician Walter Wren and his first wife, Eliza (née Cox)) in 1886 at St Mary Magdalene, Paddington. They had one son, George Wren Howard, who would become a book publisher with Jonathan Cape.

Howard died in 1935, aged 74.
