= Amy Sayle =

British politician and health visitor

Amy Sayle MBE (4 April 1884 – 1970) was a British politician and health visitor.

Born in London, Sayle was educated privately, then in Bremen, at the Lycée Molière in Paris, at King's College London, Newnham College, Cambridge, and the London School of Economics, acquiring qualifications in medicine and modern languages. She became a health visitor, and joined the Women Sanitary Inspectors' and Health Visitors' Association. In 1918/19, she served as honorary secretary of the union, then became its acting chair in 1921, and chair in 1922/23 and 1925/26.

Sayle was also active in the Labour Party, and stood unsuccessfully for the party in Hemel Hempstead at the 1924 UK general election. In 1926 she served as president of the South Kensington Labour Party, and in the 1926 Birthday Honours she was also made a Member of the Order of the British Empire (MBE) for her services as Chairman of the Women Sanitary Inspectors' and Health Visitors' Association. She stood repeatedly for the London County Council, losing in Brixton in 1925, Hackney Central in 1928, and Dulwich in 1931, before finally winning a seat in Kennington at the 1934 election. She held the seat until 1946, when she was appointed as an alderman, and then retired in 1949.

In 1934, Sayle convened the conference which established the British Federation of Social Workers.
