= Lambeth North (London County Council constituency) =

London County Council constituency

- Former constituency for the London County Council

Former constituency
- Created: 1889
- Abolished: 1949
- Member(s): 2
- Replaced by: Vauxhall

Lambeth North was a constituency used for elections to the London County Council between 1889 and 1949. The seat shared boundaries with the UK Parliament constituency of the same name.

== Councillors ==
Year	Name	Party	Name	Party
1889	Henry Bell	Moderate	James Rolls Hoare	Moderate
1892	Charles Ford	Progressive	Frank Smith	Progressive
1895	Charles Ford	Progressive	Spencer Barclay Heward	Progressive
1898	Charles Ford	Progressive	Frank Smith	Progressive
1901	William Wightman	Progressive	Robert Williams	Progressive
1904	William Wightman	Progressive	Jabez Williams	Moderate
1905	Frank Briant	Progressive	Jabez Williams	Moderate
1907	Frank Briant	Progressive	Frank Smith	Labour
1913	Frank Briant	Progressive	Louis Courtauld	Municipal Reform
1919	Owen Jacobsen	Progressive	Rose Lamartine Yates	Independent
1922	Reginald Myer	Progressive	Richard Charles Powell	Labour
1925	George Strauss	Labour	Richard Charles Powell	Labour
1928	George Strauss	Labour	Jennie Adamson	Labour
1931	Frank Briant	Liberal	Ida Samuel	Liberal
1934	Reginald Ellison	Labour	Ada Emily Gray	Labour
1937	Will Lockyer	Labour	Ada Emily Gray	Labour
1946	Will Lockyer	Labour	Patricia Strauss	Labour

== Election results ==
1889 London County Council election: Lambeth North
Party	Candidate	Votes	%	±%
Moderate	James Rolls Hoare	1,361		
Moderate	Henry Bell	1,130		
Progressive	Charles Ford	1,000		
Independent	Francis Godolphin Pelham	955		
Progressive	Charles Wager Ryalls	954		
Progressive	John Henry Lile	794		
Moderate win (new seat)				
Moderate win (new seat)				

1892 London County Council election: Lambeth North
Party	Candidate	Votes	%	±%
Progressive	Frank Smith	2,227		
Progressive	Charles Ford	2,223		
Moderate	George Adney Payne	1,458		
Moderate	Edward Tufnell	1,376		
Progressive gain from Moderate		Swing		
Progressive gain from Moderate		Swing		

1895 London County Council election: Lambeth North
Party	Candidate	Votes	%	±%
Progressive	Charles Ford	1,828		
Progressive	Spencer Barclay Heward	1,814		
Moderate	A. Keyser	1,277		
Moderate	H. Lynn	1,271		
Progressive hold		Swing		
Progressive hold		Swing		

1898 London County Council election: Lambeth North
Party	Candidate	Votes	%	±%
Progressive	Charles Ford	1,849		
Progressive	Frank Smith	1,557		
Moderate	Charles Ansell	1,252		
Moderate	R. Mortimer	1,072		
Progressive hold		Swing		
Progressive hold		Swing		

1901 London County Council election: Lambeth North
Party	Candidate	Votes	%	±%
Progressive	Robert Williams	1,677	27.4	−4.9
Progressive	William Wightman	1,761	28.8	+1.6
Conservative	Jabez Williams	1,357	22.2	+3.5
Conservative	Charles Ansell	1,329	21.7	−0.1
Progressive hold		Swing		
Progressive hold		Swing	-3.3	

1904 London County Council election: Lambeth North
Party	Candidate	Votes	%	±%
Progressive	William Wightman	1,180		
Conservative	Jabez Williams	1,132		
Conservative	A. Brooks	1,103		
Progressive	J. G. Gregory	1,028		
Independent Progressive	William Edward Clery	422		
Independent Progressive	J. Clark	419		
Independent Progressive	William Henry Lock	265		
Majority				
Progressive hold		Swing		
Municipal Reform gain from Progressive		Swing		

1907 London County Council election: Lambeth North
Party	Candidate	Votes	%	±%
Progressive	Frank Briant	2,360		
Labour	Frank Smith	2,249		
Municipal Reform	Jabez Williams	2,080		
Municipal Reform	G. Hinds	2,077		
Majority				
Progressive hold		Swing		
Labour gain from Municipal Reform		Swing		

1910 London County Council election: Lambeth North
Party	Candidate	Votes	%	±%
Progressive	Frank Briant	2,262		
Labour	Frank Smith	1,930		
Municipal Reform	H. Norris	1,780		
Municipal Reform	Henry Charlewood Turner	1,753		
Majority				
Progressive hold		Swing		
Labour hold		Swing		

1913 London County Council election: Lambeth North
Party	Candidate	Votes	%	±%
Progressive	Frank Briant	2,370	27.5	−1.8
Municipal Reform	Louis Courtauld	2,118	24.5	+1.5
Municipal Reform	William Gough-Cook	2,105	24.4	+1.7
Labour	Frank Smith	2,037	23.6	−1.4
Majority		13	0.1	
Progressive hold		Swing	-1.7	
Municipal Reform gain from Labour		Swing	+1.5	

1919 London County Council election: Lambeth North
Party	Candidate	Votes	%	±%
Progressive	Owen Jacobsen	2,656	38.1	
Independent	Rose Lamartine Yates	2,619	37.6	n/a
Municipal Reform	Louis Courtauld	885	12.7	
Municipal Reform	Camac Wilkinson	809	11.6	
Majority		1,734	24.9	
Progressive hold		Swing		
Independent gain from Municipal Reform		Swing	n/a	

1922 London County Council election: Lambeth North
Party	Candidate	Votes	%	±%
Labour	Richard Charles Powell	3,019	17.3	n/a
Progressive	Reginald Myer	3,015	17.2	−20.9
Progressive	Frank Dawson Lapthorn	3,015	17.2	n/a
Labour	J. C. Bessell	2,838	16.2	n/a
Municipal Reform	R. T. Sharpe	2,802	16.0	+3.3
Municipal Reform	T. Page	2,793	16.0	+4.4
Majority		0	0.0	−24.9
Labour gain from Independent		Swing	n/a	
Progressive hold		Swing		

1925 London County Council election: Lambeth North
Party	Candidate	Votes	%	±%
Labour	George Strauss	4,452		
Labour	Richard Charles Powell	4,331		
Municipal Reform	George Gordon	2,341		
Municipal Reform	F. H. Armstrong	2,299		
Progressive	Frank Dawson Lapthorn	1,776		
Progressive	Edith Neville	1,625		
Majority				
Labour gain from Progressive		Swing		
Labour hold		Swing		

1928 London County Council election: Lambeth North
Party	Candidate	Votes	%	±%
Labour	George Strauss	4,303		
Labour	Jennie Adamson	4,239		
Liberal	Ida Samuel	2,665		
Liberal	Seth Coward	2,586		
Municipal Reform	R. Elwes	2,014		
Municipal Reform	N. G. Richards	1,998		
Majority				
Labour hold		Swing		
Labour hold		Swing		

1931 London County Council election: Lambeth North
Party	Candidate	Votes	%	±%
Liberal	Frank Briant	5,453		
Liberal	Ida Samuel	4,875		
Labour	Ada Gray	3,395		
Labour	George Strauss	3,384		
Majority				
Liberal gain from Labour		Swing		
Liberal gain from Labour		Swing		

1934 London County Council election: Lambeth North
Party	Candidate	Votes	%	±%
Labour	Reginald Ellison	4,867		
Labour	Ada Gray	4,854		
Liberal	Frank Briant	4,245		
Liberal	Ida Samuel	4,074		
Majority				
Labour gain from Liberal		Swing		
Labour gain from Liberal		Swing		

1937 London County Council election: Lambeth North
Party	Candidate	Votes	%	±%
Labour	Ada Gray	6,059		
Labour	Will Lockyer	6,000		
Municipal Reform	J. W. Simpson	2,064		
Municipal Reform	Herbert Butcher	1,934		
Liberal	R. C. Shawyer	1,311		
Liberal	M. Allan	1,186		
Majority				
Labour hold		Swing		
Labour hold		Swing		

1946 London County Council election: Lambeth North
Party	Candidate	Votes	%	±%
Labour	Patricia Strauss	Unopposed	n/a	n/a
Labour	Will Lockyer	Unopposed	n/a	n/a
Majority				
Labour hold		Swing		
Labour hold		Swing		
