= Hugh Roberts (politician) =

Welsh Politician

Hugh Roberts (born 1880) was a Welsh trade unionist and politician.

Born in Holyhead, Roberts became a carpenter and joiner. He relocated to Liverpool and joined the Amalgamated Society of Carpenters and Joiners (ASC&J), becoming the chair of its Liverpool No.2 branch in 1901.

Roberts later relocated to London, where he became active in the Labour Party. In 1912, he became honorary organiser of the Paddington and Kensington Labour Council. In 1918, he became secretary of the Paddington Labour Party, and also honorary organiser of the National League of the Blind. In 1920, he made the London arrangements for the Blind March to London.

In 1921, he became the London District Secretary of the National Association of Theatrical Employees (NATE). In 1923, he was elected as general secretary of NATE. He also served on the executive of the London Labour Party, and of the London Trades Council.

At the 1925 London County Council election, Roberts was elected in Mile End, serving a single term. He stood down as leader of NATE in 1932.

Trade union offices
| Preceded by William Johnson | General Secretary of the National Association of Theatrical Employees; 1923–1932 | Succeeded by Tom O'Brien |
