= Mile End (London County Council constituency) =

London County Council constituency

- Former constituency for the London County Council

Former constituency
- Created: 1889
- Abolished: 1949
- Member(s): 2
- Replaced by: Stepney

Mile End was a constituency used for elections to the London County Council between 1889 and 1949. The seat shared boundaries with the UK Parliament constituency of the same name.

== Councillors ==
Year	Name	Party	Name	Party
1889	Frederick Nicholas Charrington	Progressive	Alfred Jordan Hollington	Progressive
1895	Gerard Bicker-Caarten	Moderate	William de Montmorency	Moderate
1898	John Renwick Seager	Progressive	Bertram Straus	Progressive
1902	Alfred Ordway Goodrich	Conservative	Bertram Straus	Progressive
1904	George John Warren	Progressive	Bertram Straus	Progressive
1907	Edward Holton Coumbe	Municipal Reform	Robert Hugh Montgomery	Municipal Reform
1910	James May	Progressive	Carl Stettauer	Progressive
1913	Thomas William Wickham	Progressive	Carl Stettauer	Progressive
1913	Thomas William Wickham	Progressive	George Albert Dutfield	Progressive
1917	Thomas William Wickham	Progressive	George Bettesworth Piggott	Progressive
1919	Alfred Ordway Goodrich	Municipal Reform	David Hazel	Municipal Reform
1922	John Cecil Gerard Leigh	Municipal Reform	Offley Wakeman	Municipal Reform
1925	Hugh Roberts	Labour	Julia Scurr	Labour
1926	Hugh Roberts	Labour	Johnnie Dodge	Anti-Socialist
1926	Hugh Roberts	Labour	Johnnie Dodge	Municipal Reform
1928	Lionel Guest	Municipal Reform	Johnnie Dodge	Municipal Reform
1931	Daniel Frankel	Labour	John Scurr	Labour
1932	Daniel Frankel	Labour	Somerville Hastings	Labour
1946	Ted Bramley	Communist	Jack Gaster	Communist

== Election results ==
1889 London County Council election: Mile End
Party	Candidate	Votes	%	±%
Progressive	Frederick Nicholas Charrington	1,424		
Progressive	Alfred Jordan Hollington	1,265		
Moderate	Rowland Hirst	1,187		
Moderate	Frederick James Reilly	1,172		
Progressive win (new seat)				
Progressive win (new seat)				

1892 London County Council election: Mile End
Party	Candidate	Votes	%	±%
Progressive	Frederick Nicholas Charrington	1,977		
Progressive	Alfred Jordan Hollington	1,896		
Moderate	Rowland Hirst	1,084		
Moderate	H. Roberts	1,050		
Progressive hold		Swing		
Progressive hold		Swing		

1895 London County Council election: Mile End
Party	Candidate	Votes	%	±%
Moderate	William de Montmorency	1,618		
Moderate	Gerard Bicker-Caarten	1,562		
Progressive	A. Druitt	1,407		
Progressive	A. Davies	1,385		
Moderate gain from Progressive		Swing		
Moderate gain from Progressive		Swing		

1898 London County Council election: Mile End
Party	Candidate	Votes	%	±%
Progressive	John Renwick Seager	1,711		
Progressive	Bertram Straus	1,669		
Moderate	L. Darwin	1,535		
Moderate	Gerard Bicker-Caarten	1,492		
Progressive gain from Moderate		Swing		
Progressive gain from Moderate		Swing		

1901 London County Council election: Mile End
Party	Candidate	Votes	%	±%
Progressive	Bertram Straus	1,941	29.9	+3.9
Progressive	John Renwick Seager	1,906	29.4	+2.7
Conservative	Ernest Flower	1,341	20.6	−3.4
Conservative	George Henry Booth	1,306	20.1	−3.2
Progressive hold		Swing		
Progressive hold		Swing	+3.3	

1904 London County Council election: Mile End
Party	Candidate	Votes	%	±%
Progressive	George John Warren	2,125		
Progressive	Bertram Straus	2,121		
Conservative	A. Goodrich	1,539		
Conservative	W. R. Smith	1,368		
Independent	W. Baxter	36		
Majority				
Progressive hold		Swing		

1907 London County Council election: Mile End
Party	Candidate	Votes	%	±%
Municipal Reform	Robert Hugh Montgomery	2,023		
Municipal Reform	Edward Holton Coumbe	2,011		
Progressive	R. Harcourt	1,988		
Progressive	T. Warren	1,925		
Majority				
Municipal Reform gain from Progressive		Swing		
Municipal Reform gain from Progressive		Swing		

1910 London County Council election: Mile End
Party	Candidate	Votes	%	±%
Progressive	Carl Stettauer	2,032		
Progressive	James May	2,016		
Municipal Reform	Edward Holton Coumbe	1,973		
Municipal Reform	Cecil Ince	1,924		
Majority				
Progressive hold		Swing		
Progressive hold		Swing		

1913 London County Council election: Mile End
Party	Candidate	Votes	%	±%
Progressive	Thomas William Wickham	2,252		
Progressive	Carl Stettauer	2,204		
Municipal Reform	Edward Holton Coumbe	1,973		
Municipal Reform	Cecil Ince	1,924		
Majority				
Progressive hold		Swing		
Progressive hold		Swing		

1919 London County Council election: Mile End
Party	Candidate	Votes	%	±%
Municipal Reform	Alfred Ordway Goodrich	1,874	31.2	
Municipal Reform	David Hazel	1,800	29.9	
Labour	I. Sharp	1,172	19.5	
Labour	Bernard Noël Langdon-Davies	1,166	19.4	
Majority		628	10.4	
Municipal Reform hold		Swing		
Municipal Reform gain from Progressive		Swing		

1922 London County Council election: Mile End
Party	Candidate	Votes	%	±%
Municipal Reform	John Cecil Gerard Leigh	3,695	27.4	−3.8
Municipal Reform	Offley Wakeman	3,658	27.1	−2.8
Labour	Clarence Henry Norman	3,077	22.8	+3.3
Labour	John Scurr	3,048	22.6	+3.2
Majority		581	4.3	−6.1
Municipal Reform hold		Swing		
Municipal Reform hold		Swing		

1925 London County Council election: Mile End
Party	Candidate	Votes	%	±%
Labour	Julia Scurr	3,587		
Labour	Hugh Roberts	3,290		
Progressive	J. W. Rosenthal	2,674		
Municipal Reform	Offley Wakeman	2,531		
Majority				
Labour gain from Municipal Reform		Swing		
Labour gain from Municipal Reform		Swing		

Mile End by-election, 1926
Party	Candidate	Votes	%	±%
Anti-Socialist	Johnnie Dodge	4,116		
Labour	Esther Rickards	3,843		
Progressive	Robert Gurney Randall	475		
Majority		273		
Anti-Socialist gain from Labour				

1928 London County Council election: Mile End
Party	Candidate	Votes	%	±%
Municipal Reform	Johnnie Dodge	4,860		
Municipal Reform	Lionel Guest	4,583		
Labour	Esther Rickards	4,015		
Labour	A. C. Warwick	3,950		
Liberal	Samuel Immanuel Cohen	1,196		
Liberal	Marcus Lipton	1,147		
Majority				
Municipal Reform gain from Labour		Swing		
Municipal Reform gain from Labour		Swing		

1931 London County Council election: Mile End
Party	Candidate	Votes	%	±%
Labour	John Scurr	3,994		
Labour	Daniel Frankel	3,965		
Municipal Reform	F. R. Barker	3,806		
Municipal Reform	Dudley Ryder	3,615		
Majority				
Labour gain from Municipal Reform		Swing		
Labour gain from Municipal Reform		Swing		

Mile End by-election, 1932
Party	Candidate	Votes	%	±%
Labour	Somerville Hastings	4,116		
Municipal Reform	Frank Barker	1,853		
Majority		2,263		
Labour hold		Swing		

1934 London County Council election: Mile End
Party	Candidate	Votes	%	±%
Labour	Daniel Frankel	6,113		
Labour	Somerville Hastings	6,042		
Municipal Reform	A. H. Anderson	2,823		
Municipal Reform	R. G. Mullan	2,775		
Majority				
Labour hold		Swing		
Labour hold		Swing		

1937 London County Council election: Mile End
Party	Candidate	Votes	%	±%
Labour	Daniel Frankel	7,365		
Labour	Somerville Hastings	7,286		
Municipal Reform	W. J. O'Donovan	4,420		
Municipal Reform	T. H. Fligelstone	3,998		
Majority				
Labour hold		Swing		
Labour hold		Swing		

1946 London County Council election: Mile End
Party	Candidate	Votes	%	±%
Communist	Jack Gaster	2,788		
Communist	Ted Bramley	2,783		
Labour	Somerville Hastings	2,420		
Labour	Elsie Janner	2,349		
Majority				
Communist gain from Labour		Swing		
Communist gain from Labour		Swing		
