= Sylvia Lynd =

Anglo-Irish poet, essayist, short story writer and novelist

- Born: 1888; Hampstead, London
- Died: February 21, 1952 (aged 63–64)
- Occupations: Writer, poet
- Spouse: Robert Wilson Lynd
- Writing career
- Language: English

Sylvia Lynd (née Dryhurst; 1888 – 21 February 1952) was an Anglo-Irish poet, essayist, short story writer and novelist.

== Early life ==
She was born in London around 1888, like her father, British Museum official and early Fabian, Alfred Robert Dryhurst. But her mother, the suffragist writer Nannie Dryhurst (née Robinson) was a Dubliner. There were some rumours that the war correspondent Henry Nevinson was her biological father, and whom had a lasting influence on Lynd.

From 1904 to 1906, Lynd studied at the Slade School of Fine Art, later moving on to the Royal Academy of Dramatic Arts. Around this time, she was associated with the Inghinidhe na hÉireann, an Irish nationalist women’s organisation. In 1908, a monthly magazine was produced, Bean na hÉireann, which sought to discuss topics such as politics, the vote for women, language, and labour issues. Lynd edited the first issue before returning to England and Helena Molony took it over.

== Literary career ==
In 1909, she married a journalist and man of letters, Robert Wilson Lynd, whom she had met at the London Gaelic League four years earlier. Born in Belfast to a Presbyterian minister, Robert Lynd wrote for The Northern Whig and later became a literary editor for the Daily News (later known as News Chronicle) and a columnist for New Statesman. They lived in Hampstead, London for many years and had two daughters, Máire (who was to marry Jack Gaster) and Sigle. The Lynds were active in Irish Nationalist circles, and spoke Irish to their daughters.

Lynd's first novel, The Chorus: A Tale of Love and Folly, was published in 1915, followed by The Thrush and the Jay in 1916, a volume of poems and essays. In the early 1920s, Lynd was a literary advisor for Macmillan publishing, taking on the role of chief book critic at Time and Tide in 1922 until 1929. With her husband, Lynd hosted many literary figures in their home, 14 Downshire Hill, such as Katherine Mansfield, H. G. Wells, and W. B. Yeats. They moved to Hampstead in 1924, and expanded their literary circle. James Joyce and Nora Barnacle held their wedding dinner there in 1931.

Hugh Walpole asked Lynd to join the judging panel for a new group, The Book Society, modelled on American book of the month clubs. She was the only female judge. She was paid in this position as both a reader and a reviewer for the Society. She sat on the committee of the Prix Femina Via Heureuse Anglais, President in 1929 and from 1938-to 1939. Her work was featured in The Nation, the New Statesman, the Weekly Westminster, The Bystander, and Harper’s Bazaar.

Lynd died in 1952, aged 63.

== Works ==
- The Chorus (1916) novel
- The Thrush and the Jay (1916) Constable, essays and poems
- The Goldfinches (1920) poems
- The Swallowdive (1921) novel
- The Mulberry Bush (1925) short stories
- The Yellow Placard (1931), Gollancz, poems
- The Christmas Omnibus (1932), Gollancz (editor)
- The Enemies (1934), Dent, poems
- English Children (1942), Britain in Pictures series, William Collins
- Selected Poems of Sylvia Lynd (1945), Macmillan
