= Wren Howard =

British publisher (1893–1968)

George Wren Howard (24 March 1893 – 30 July 1968) was a British publisher. He and Herbert Jonathan Cape founded the publishing house Jonathan Cape in 1921, and took over as chairman when Cape died in 1960.

== Biography ==
The son of Frank Geere Howard and his wife Feona, he was born in Hampstead, London, and resided there. He was educated at Marlborough College and Trinity College, Cambridge. He was in the King's Royal Rifle Corps in World War I, and was awarded the Military Cross.

In 1915, he married Eileen, daughter of barrister John Castleman Swinburne-Hanham, of Manston House, Dorset; they had one son and one daughter. She died in 1950.

According to Philip Ziegler he was a "trim, spruce figure of military appearance ... He had a fine eye for design, and it was largely due to him that Cape's books became highly esteemed for their good looks and high standards of production". His "cautious precision complemented Cape's more swashbuckling approach while reinforcing his reluctance to part with more money than was absolutely necessary" and "he was even more cheese-paring than his chairman" (i.e. Cape). He "actively disliked" authors, and as Cape felt "little affection" for them, fraternisation was left to the junior partner Rupert Hart-Davis.

== Sources ==
- Obituary in The Times, London of 30 July 1968 p8
- Ziegler, Philip (2004). Rupert Hart-Davis: Man of Letters. Chatto & Windus, London. p. 88,89. ISBN 0-7011-7320-3.
