= James Winder Good =

Irish political journalist and writer

- Born: 1877; Limerick, Ireland
- Died: 1930 (aged 52–53); Dublin, Ireland
- Education: Royal Belfast Academical Institution; Queen's University Belfast
- Occupation: Political journalist
- Employer(s): Belfast Newsletter, Northern Whig, Freeman's Journal, Irish Independent

James Winder Good (1877–1930) was an Irish political journalist and writer. Rejecting the Unionism of his Protestant youth, Good migrated from the Belfast Newsletter to Dublin's Freeman's Journal. In the years leading to Irish statehood and Partition he was a persistent critic of British policy and of Irish sectarianism.

Good was born 15 January 1877 in Limerick, eldest son of Benjamin Good, an RIC constable, and Margaret Good (née Winder). His family moved to Belfast and he was educated at the Royal Belfast Academical Institution, where he befriended Robert Wilson Lynd and Paul Henry. Lynd recalled Good remarking that he wouldn't miss a Belfast riot for the offer of a first-night seat at a London play.

Good graduated from Queen's College Belfast and began his journalistic career in Belfast as a reporter with the Newsletter. He supported the Ulster Literary Theatre. In 1908, the company produced his play "Leaders of the people" at the Abbey Theatre in Dublin. Written under the pseudonym ‘Robert Harding’, the Ibsenite drama focuses on the trials of a new conciliation party candidate in an Ulster election.

Good was assistant editor of the Northern Whig before moving in 1916, the year of the Easter Rising, to Dublin to work as a leader writer for the Freeman's Journal, a paper closely allied to the Irish Parliamentary Party.

Despite his aversion to Partition, Good supported acceptance of twenty-six county dominion statehood under the Anglo-Irish Treaty. He believed that "hard" economic facts would persuade the Unionist six-county regime in Belfast that economic stability required "working arrangements" with the new Free State government in Dublin, and might, in time, "open the eyes of its former devotees to the drawbacks of Partition".

In 1921, Good published a short polemical biography of the Land League activist Michael Davitt. It expresses Good's preference for a national politics based on open organisation (as opposed to the "Fenianism" of Davitt's early years) and on popular economic and social interest. He lauds Davitt as the man whose "hammer strokes destroyed a system of land tenure, which for over three centuries had been the most powerful instrument in encompassing the economic degradation of the Irish people, and ensuring their subjugation to alien rule."

As leader writer and drama critic Good joined the Irish Independent when, after the anti-Treaty IRA destroyed its presses, the Freeman's Journal merged with the paper in 1924. Good was also a regular correspondent for British and U.S. newspapers.

From 1923 Good was assistant to George William Russell as editor of the Irish Statesman (1923–30) "the first major post-independence Irish intellectual review." Contributors included W. B. Yeats, George Bernard Shaw and Susan Langstaff Mitchell.

Good died in Dublin on 2 May 1930.

== Works ==
- Leaders of the people (play written under the pseudonym Robert Harding; premiered at the Abbey Theatre, Dublin, 1908)
- Ulster and Ireland (Maunsel & Co. Ltd, Dublin, 1919)
- Irish Unionism (Dublin: Talbot Press, 1920)
- Michael Davitt (Cumann Leigeacrai an Phobail, Dublin, 1921).
- "Two Irish Patriots (Dr William Drennan and Mrs Martha McTier)", Studies: an Irish Quarterly Review 10:38, 1921.
