= Xenia Field =

British county councillor, prison reformer, philanthropist, horticulturist and author

Xenia Field MBE

Member of the London County Council for Paddington North
- In office 1946–1950

Personal details
- Born: Xenia Noelle Lowinsky; 25 December 1894 Secunderabad, India
- Died: 24 January 1998 (aged 103) London, UK
- Party: Labour; SDP (from 1982)
- Spouse: James Field (m. 1936; died 1941)
- Parent: Thomas Hermann Lowinsky (father)
- Occupation: Philanthropist, county councillor, and author

Xenia Noelle Field MBE (née Lowinsky; 25 December 1894 – 24 January 1998) was a British county councillor, prison reformer, philanthropist, horticulturist and author.

== Early life ==
Field was born on 25 December 1894 at Secunderabad, India, where her father Thomas Hermann Lowinsky was general manager of the Hyderabad (Deccan) Co coal mines. On their return to England, the family lived at Tittenhurst Park in Berkshire. Field was a pupil at Heathfield School, and then attended finishing school in Paris. Her father was a keen gardener, who won a Royal Horticultural Society gold medal.

== Career ==
In World War II, after a stint in the Women's Royal Voluntary Service, she led the Women's Organization for Salvage and Recovery for Herbert Morrison of the Ministry of Supply.

With Morrison's support, she was elected as a Labour member of London County Council in 1946, representing Paddington North electoral division. She stood, unsuccessfully, for parliament, first at North Somerset in 1950 and then at Colchester in 1951. She also sat as a magistrate, and became interested in prison reform. She joined the breakaway Social Democratic Party (SDP) in 1982, shortly after their formation.

She used a bequest from her father to establish a charitable trust, the Field Foundation, under whose auspices she gave financial support to The Salvation Army, persuading them to set up the first bail hostel in Britain, in 1971. She was made a Member of the Order of the British Empire (MBE) in 1958, and appeared as a castaway on the BBC Radio programme Desert Island Discs on 12 June 1967. She also won the Royal Horticultural Society's Veitch Memorial Medal, in 1972.

== Personal life ==
She married Dr. James Field, a much older man, in 1936; he died only five years later.

== Death ==
She died at Goldsborough Nursing Home, Ladbroke Road, Kensington, London on 24 January 1998, from a stroke. She was 103.

== Bibliography ==
- Window Box Gardening.
- Growing Bulbs in the House. 1954.
- The Housewife Book of House Plants. The Garden City Press Limited. 1956.
- Under Lock and Key: a Study of Women in Prison. 1963.
- Indoor Plants. Paul Hamlyn Limited. 1966.
- Colorful World of Roses. The Hamlyn Publishing Group Limited. 1969.
- Book of Garden Flowers. The Hamlyn Publishing Group Limited. 1971.
- Gardening From Scratch. The Hamlyn Publishing Group Limited. 1973.
- Gardening Week by Week. Crescent Books. 1975.
