= George de Swiet =

George de Swiet (23 February 1888 – 23 September 1951) was a Polish medical doctor and politician active in England, where he served on London County Council.

== Early life and education ==
Born in Poland as George Swietochowski, he studied at various European universities, graduating in medicine from the Ludwig-Maximilians-Universität München in 1910. He then moved to London, studying at the London Hospital Medical College and King's College Hospital, changing his surname to "de Swietchowski", and later to "de Swiet". From 1912, he practised medicine in London, working at Denmark Hill during World War I. In 1914, he published Mechano-Therapeutics in General Practice, and he also translated Heliotherapy of Tuberculosis. After the war, he moved to Paddington, where he practised for the rest of his life.

== Career in politics ==
De Swiet became interested in politics and joined the Liberal Party, standing unsuccessfully in Paddington North at the 1935 UK general election. He then moved to the Labour Party, and at the 1946 London County Council election, he won a seat in Paddington North. He also served on Paddington Metropolitan Borough Council.

De Swiet was active in the British Medical Association, chairing its Paddington Division, and he also served as honorary president of the Polish Medical Association in the British Empire.
