= Jack Gaster =

British communist solicitor and politician

Jacob Gaster (6 October 1907 – 12 March 2007), known as Jack Gaster, was a British communist solicitor and politician.

== Biography ==
Gaster was born in Maida Vale. He was the son of Moses Gaster, the leader of the Sephardic Jewish Congregation in London, and Lucy Friedlander. He studied at the London School of Economics and then entered a legal career, qualifying as a solicitor in 1931, and soon thereafter forming a socialist law practice with Richard Turner.

In 1926, Gaster joined the Independent Labour Party (ILP), inspired by its support for workers during the British General Strike. He became prominent in the party, and was its representative at the arrival of the Jarrow March in London. He was also a champion of unity with the Communist Party of Great Britain (CPGB), and to this end was a founder of the ILP's Revolutionary Policy Committee. The Committee persuaded the ILP to disaffiliate from the Labour Party, but could not convince members to merge with the CPGB. As a result, Gaster sided with the majority faction of the Committee in resigning from the ILP in 1935 and joining the CPGB.

In 1938, Gaster married a fellow Communist, Moira (Maire) Lynd, the second daughter of Robert Wilson Lynd and Sylvia Lynd. He and Maire had three children.

In World War II, Gaster enlisted in the British Army and was posted to the Royal Sussex Regiment. It was later learned he was being closely monitored during this time by British intelligence agencies. He suffered a severe injury in basic training, which ruled out overseas deployment. Instead, he taught illiterate soldiers as a sergeant instructor.

In 1946, Gaster was elected to the London County Council in Mile End, alongside fellow communist Ted Bramley. Gaster lost the seat in 1949, and ran unsuccessfully to regain it in 1952. He subsequently acted as principal legal adviser to the CPGB, and was a vice-president of the Haldane Society of Socialist Lawyers.

During the Korean War, Gaster travelled to North Korea as part of an international legal team of observers. The group produced a report covering a range of issues, including the conditions for prisoners of war. The report was heavily criticised for its allegations of germ warfare by the U.S.

Gaster remained a communist solicitor until his retirement in 1990, and an activist in the CPGB until its dissolution in 1991—a move he strongly disagreed with. He temporarily found a home in the Socialist Labour Party, but then resigned from it to concentrate on the pensioners' movement. He also devoted time in support of the Marx Memorial Library.

On 12 March 2007, Jack Gaster died at his home in London. He was 99.

Party political offices
Preceded by J. Allen Skinner	London Division representative on the National Administrative Council of the Independent Labour Party; 1933–1936	Succeeded by John Aplin
