= Robert Wilson Lynd =

Irish writer (1879–1949)

- Robiard Ó Flionn/Roibeard Ua Flionn
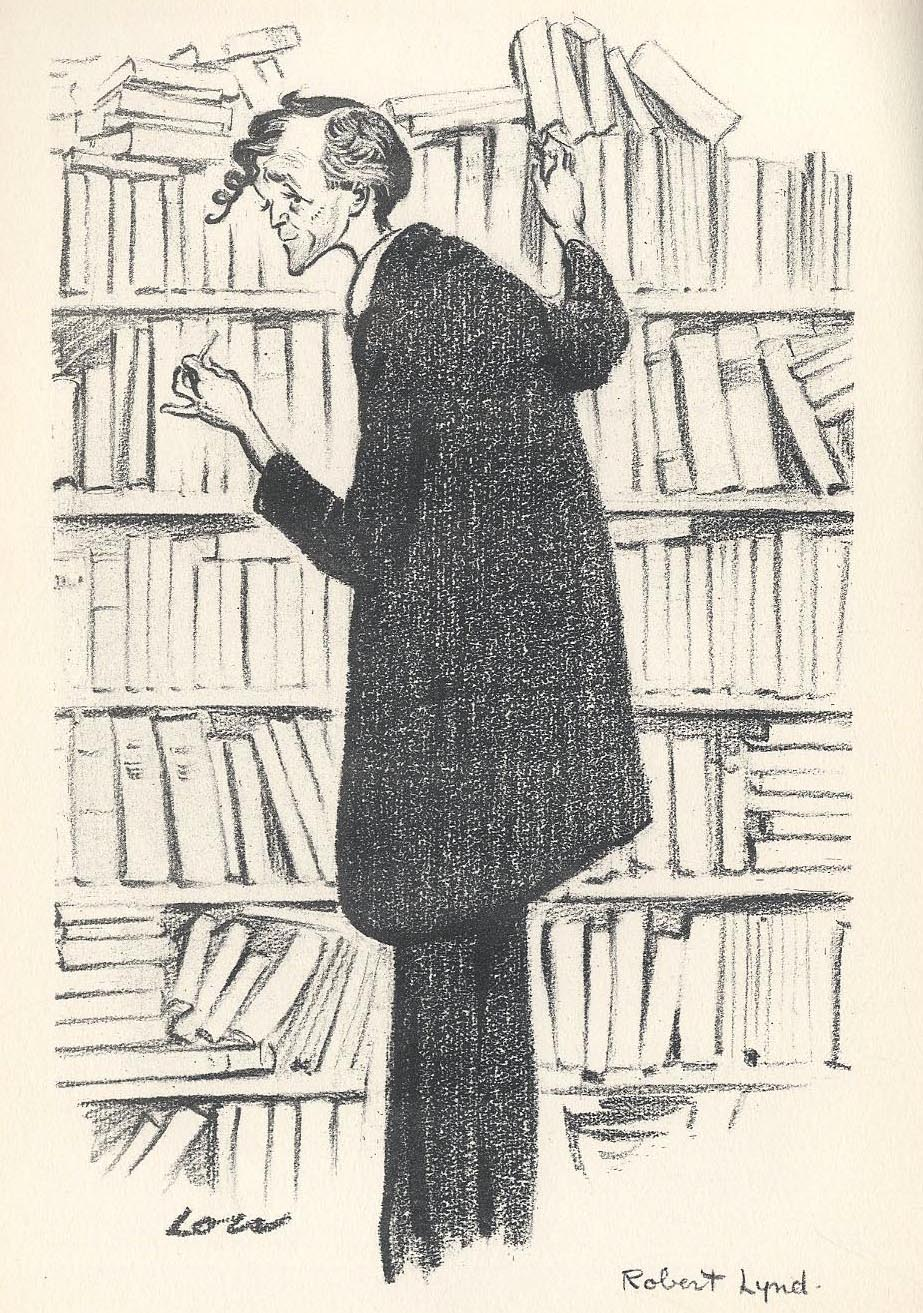
- Caricature of Robert Lynd, 1928
- Born: 20 April 1879; Belfast, Ireland
- Died: 6 October 1949 (aged 70); Hampstead, London, England
- Resting place: Belfast City Cemetery
- Spouse: Sylvia Dryhurst
- Children: Máire and Sigle
- Relatives: Tim Wheeler (grandson); The Baron Lowry (grandnephew)
- Writing career
- Language: English, Irish
- Years active: 1906–1949
- Genres: Essays, poems
- Movement: Irish literary revival

Robert Wilson Lynd (Irish: Roibéard Ó Floinn; 20 April 1879 – 6 October 1949) was an Irish writer, editor of poetry, urbane literary essayist, socialist and Irish nationalist.

== Early life ==
Lynd was born at 3 Brookhill Avenue in Cliftonville, Belfast to Robert John Lynd, a Presbyterian minister, and Sarah Rentoul Lynd, the second of seven children. Lynd's paternal great-grandfather emigrated from Scotland to Ireland.

Lynd was educated at Royal Belfast Academical Institution, where he befriended James Winder Good and Paul Henry, and studied at Queen's University. His father served a term as Presbyterian Church Moderator as one of a long line of Presbyterian clergy in the family. A 2003 essayist on Lynd recounts that his "maternal grandfather, great-grandfather and great-great-grandfather had all been Presbyterian clergymen."

== Literary career ==
Lynd began as a journalist, with James Winder Good, on The Northern Whig in Belfast. He moved to London in 1901, via Manchester, sharing accommodation with Paul Henry who was establishing himself as an artist. Firstly he wrote drama criticism, for Today, edited by Jerome K. Jerome. He also wrote for the Daily News (later the News Chronicle), being its literary editor 1912–47.

The Lynds were literary hosts, in the group including J. B. Priestley. They were on good terms also with Hugh Walpole. Priestley, Walpole and Sylvia Lynd were founding committee members of the Book Society. Irish guests included James Joyce and James Stephens. On one occasion reported by Victor Gollancz in Reminiscences of Affection, p. 90, Joyce intoned Anna Livia Plurabelle to his own piano accompaniment.

He used the pseudonym Y.Y. (Ys, or wise) in writing for the New Statesman. According to C. H. Rolph's Kingsley (1973), Lynd's weekly essay, which ran from 1913 to 1945, was "irreplaceable". In 1941, editor Kingsley Martin decided to alternate it with pieces by James Bridie on Ireland, but the experiment was not at all a success.

== Political activism ==
Attendance at a performance in London of John Millington Synge's play Riders to the Sea aroused Lynd's Irish Nationalist sympathies. These were further radicalised by the Home Rule crisis of 1912–14. He was appalled at the threat of the use of violence to deliver Ulster from Home Rule and the later decision to postpone the implementation of the Third Home Rule Bill. He later wrote: "Then came August 1914 and England began a war for the freedom of small nations by postponing the freedom of the only small nation in Europe which it was within her power to liberate with the stroke of a pen."

Of James Connolly, Lynd was to write: "among the sixteen men who were executed after the failure of the Irish Insurrection of 1916 there was no nobler or more heroic figure than James Connolly". He described Connolly as "a working-class leader and a Nationalist in almost equal Proportions. He was at once as patriotic as Garibaldi and as revolutionary as Lenin". At the request of the Irish Transport and General Workers' Union, Lynd wrote an introduction to a new edition of James Connolly's Labour in Irish history, first published in 1910.

He became a fluent Irish speaker, and Gaelic League member. As a Sinn Féin activist, he used the name Robiard Ó Flionn/Roibeard Ua Flionn. He nonetheless rejected an ethnic definition of what it is to be Irish:

The 'Real irishman' is neither essentially a Celt nor essentially a Catholic. He is merely a man who has the good or bad fortune to be born in Ireland or of Irish parents, and who is interested in Ireland more than any other country ... the Orange labourer of the north whose ancestors may have come from Scotland, has all the attributes of an Irishman no less than the Catholic labourer of the west, whose ancestors may have come from Greece, or from Spain, or from anywhere you care to speculate.

In Belfast he was a member both of the republican Dungannon Clubs and of the Belfast Socialist Society.

== Personal life and death ==
Lynd married the writer Sylvia Dryhurst on 21 April 1909. They had met at Gaelic League meetings in London. Their daughters Máire and Sigle became close friends of Isaiah Berlin. Máire married communist lawyer Jack Gaster and had three children. Sigle's son, born in 1941, is artist Tim Wheeler.

In March 1924, Robert and Sylvia moved to what was to be their long-term married home, the elegant Regency house of 5 Keats Grove in the leafy suburb of Hampstead, north-west London. The house had been lived in by various members of Sylvia's (Dryhurst) family.

James Joyce and his wife Nora Barnacle held their wedding lunch at the Lynds' house after getting married at Hampstead Town Hall on 4 July 1931.

Lynd died in Hampstead in 1949. He is buried in Belfast City Cemetery. Seán MacBride, Minister for External Affairs, attended the funeral as the representative of the government of the Republic of Ireland.

== Works ==
"Cats", Ch. 5 of The Pleasure of Ignorance
Read by Perry Clayton for LibriVox
Audio 00:12:06 (full text)

- The Mantle of the Emperor (1906) with Ladbroke Black
- Irish and English (1908)
- Home Life in Ireland (1909)
- Rambles in Ireland (1912)
- The Book of This and That (1915)
- If the Germans Conquered England (1917)
- Old and New Masters (1919)
- Ireland a Nation (1919)
- The Art of Letters (1920)
- The Passion of Labour (1920) New Statesman articles
- The Pleasures of Ignorance (1921)
- Solomon in All His Glory (1922)
- The Sporting Life and Other Trifles (1922)
- Books and Authors (1922)
- The Blue Lion (1923)
- Selected Essays (1923)
- The Peal of Bells (1924)
- The Money Box (1925)
- The Orange Tree (1926)
- The Little Angel (1926)
- Dr. Johnson and Company (1927)
- The Goldfish (1927)
- The Silver Books of English Sonnets (1927), editor
- The Green Man (1928)
- It's a Fine World (1930)
- Rain, Rain, go to Spain (1931)
- Great Love Stories of All Nations (1932), editor
- "Y.Y." An Anthology of Essays (1933)
- The Cockleshell (1933)
- Both Sides of the Road (1934)
- I Tremble to Think (1936)
- In Defence of Pink (1937)
- Searchlights and Nightingales (1939)
- An Anthology of Modern Poetry (1939), editor
- Life's Little Oddities (1941), illustrated by Steven Spurrier
- Further Essays of Robert Lynd (1942)
- Things One Hears (1945), illustrated by Claire Oldham
- Essays on Life and Literature (1951)
- Books and Writers (1952)
- Essays by Robert Lynd (1959)
- Galway of the Races – Selected essays (1990), edited by Sean McMahon
- Without Glasses – abridged

== See also ==
- List of writers of Northern Ireland
- List of Irish writers
