= Patricia Strauss =

British politician

Lady Patricia Strauss

Member of London County Council
- In office 7 March 1946 – 16 April 1958
- Preceded by: Ada Emily Gray
- Succeeded by: Sidney Aubrey Melman
- Constituency: Lambeth North (1946-49); Vauxhall (1949-58)

Personal details
- Born: Patricia O'Flynn; 21 October 1909
- Died: 16 July 1987 (aged 77)
- Party: Labour
- Spouse: George Strauss (m. 1932)

Patricia Frances Elizabeth Strauss, Lady Strauss (née O'Flynn; 21 October 1909 – 16 July 1987) was a British Labour politician, feminist and patron of the arts.

Before her marriage Strauss had been a professional artist's model - one of Russell Flint's favourites - then a journalist. On 21 March 1932, Patricia O'Flynn married George Strauss, a former Member of Parliament, who soon returned to office.

The couple lived on 'millionaire's row' at 1 Kensington Palace Gardens inherited from George's father; it was refurbished by modernist interior designer Wells Coates in 1931-32. Patricia and George Strauss had two sons, Roger and Brian, and a daughter, Hilary.

During the Second World War, Strauss wrote two books on prominent personalities in the Labour Party: Bevin and Co. and Cripps, Advocate and Rebel. Strauss wrote for popular magazines including articles such as 'Bevin and Morrison' for Harper's Magazine.

She was also a war correspondent with the New York Herald Tribune. Touring the United States in 1942, she addressed a lunch at the New Jersey League of Women Voters in America, stating 'the last war gave the women in England the vote, and this war is showing them how to use it'. An ardent feminist, Strauss also wrote a story titled, 'The Lady Is an Engineer', published in Vogue. In 1945 Strauss became a director and member of the Tribune, the democratic socialist periodical founded in 1937 by her husband and Stafford Cripps.

Strauss stood unsuccessfully for the Labour Party in Kensington South at the 1945 UK general election, losing heavily. In 1946, she was elected to the London County Council, representing Vauxhall. She chaired the council's Parks Committee from 1947 to 1949, championing the provision of allotments within London parks and the more inclusive use of the parks' facilities; later she chaired its Supplies Committee until 1952. Strauss led an unsuccessful campaign for the government to require 0.5% of the cost of all new buildings to be spent on art, and while chairing the Parks Committee, organised a major exhibition of international sculpture in Battersea Park. Among her most notable successes, The Open Air Exhibition of Sculpture held in Battersea Park in 1948, overcame significant logistical challenges and post-war shortages. Over 148,900 people attended the Open Air Exhibition during May to September 1948. Strauss, a keen art collector, loaned Reclining Girl by Dora Gordine to the Open Air Exhibition. However, as the exhibition opened, her home was burgled by a war deserter.

She remained on the council until 1958, but by this time was focusing on sitting on the boards of numerous arts institutions. A governor of the Royal Ballet School, Old Vic and Sadler's Wells Theatre from 1951, she was later also on the boards of the Royal Ballet, Ballet Rambert, London Opera Centre, Sadler's Wells Opera and Goldsmiths College, standing down from most of these posts only in 1985.

Ennobled, George was made a baron in 1979, and Patricia therefore became Lady Strauss. After her death in 1987, George Strauss married his long-time companion, sculptor Benita Armstrong. For a portrait of Patricia Strauss see National Portrait Gallery.
