= Vauxhall (London County Council constituency) =

London County Council constituency

- Former constituency for the London County Council

Former constituency
- Created: 1949
- Abolished: 1965
- Member: 3
- Created from: Kennington and Lambeth North

Vauxhall was a constituency used for elections to the London County Council between 1949 and the council's abolition, in 1965. The seat shared boundaries with the UK Parliament constituency of the same name.

== Councillors ==
Year	Name	Party	Name	Party	Name	Party
1949	Charles Gibson	Labour	Howell John Powell	Labour	Patricia Strauss	Labour
1952	Charles Gibson	Labour	Kythé Caroline Hendy	Labour	Patricia Strauss	Labour
1955	William Walter Begley	Labour	Kythé Caroline Hendy	Labour	Patricia Strauss	Labour
1958	William Walter Begley	Labour	Kythé Caroline Hendy	Labour	Sidney Aubrey Melman	Labour
1961	William Walter Begley	Labour	Ewan Geddes Carr	Labour	Sidney Aubrey Melman	Labour

== Election results ==
1949 London County Council election: Vauxhall
Party	Candidate	Votes	%	±%
Labour	Patricia Strauss	10,161		
Labour	Charles Gibson	10,096		
Labour	Howell John Powell	9,852		
Conservative	S. Oborne	6,317		
Conservative	W. H. Hall	6,228		
Conservative	I. Cook	6,192		

1952 London County Council election: Vauxhall
Party	Candidate	Votes	%	±%
Labour	Patricia Strauss	12,831		
Labour	Charles Gibson	12,127		
Labour	Kythé Caroline Hendy	11,765		
Conservative	S. Oborne	5,205		
Conservative	E. P. Roberts	5,008		
Conservative	I. Cook	4,894		
Labour hold		Swing		

1955 London County Council election: Vauxhall
Party	Candidate	Votes	%	±%
Labour	Patricia Strauss	6,622		
Labour	Kythé Caroline Hendy	6,067		
Labour	William Walter Begley	6,042		
Conservative	E. P. Roberts	3,130		
Conservative	A. K. Twaddle	3,087		
Conservative	W. Bell	2,997		
Liberal	B. Crooke	553		
Labour hold		Swing		

1958 London County Council election: Vauxhall
Party	Candidate	Votes	%	±%
Labour	William Walter Begley	7,594		
Labour	Kythé Caroline Hendy	7,537		
Labour	Sidney Aubrey Melman	7,256		
Conservative	Elizabeth Havers	2,171		
Conservative	B. Rathbone	1,814		
Conservative	E. P. Roberts	1,803		
Labour hold		Swing		

1961 London County Council election: Vauxhall
Party	Candidate	Votes	%	±%
Labour	Ewan Geddes Carr	8,348		
Labour	William Walter Begley	8,294		
Labour	Sidney Aubrey Melman	7,925		
Conservative	E. P. Roberts	3,129		
Conservative	B. Rathbone	3,124		
Conservative	D. E. Fearn	3,057		
Liberal	S. S. Eustace	1,472		
Liberal	A. Vickery	1,198		
Liberal	E. Webster	1,088		
Labour hold		Swing		
