= Frederick Dolman =

British journalist and politician (1867–1923)

Frederick Dolman (1867 – 11 June 1923) was a British journalist and Progressive Party politician. He was an elected member of the London County Council from 1901 to 1907.

== Background ==
Dolman was born in London. He was married with one son.

== Professional career ==
Dolman entered journalism at age of 18. He worked for the London Echo, Scarborough Evening News and the National Press Agency. He was editor of the Art Trade Journal. He was a contributor to The Strand, Pearson’s, Pall Mall Gazette and other magazines.

His written work also included a book Municipalities at work: the municipal policy of six great towns and its influence on their social welfare (with an introduction by Sir John Hutton, chairman of the London County Council), published in 1895. This compared London's social welfare provision, sometimes unfavourably, to that of other British cities.

== Political career ==
Dolman was a Progressive candidate for the Brixton division of Lambeth at the 1901 London County Council election. He was elected at the top of the poll. He was re-elected in 1904. Later, he was a Member of the London War Pensions Committee.
