= Ida Homfray =

English chemist and politician (1869–1948)

Ida Frances Homfray (1869–1948) was an English chemist and local politician.

Homfray was born in 1869 in Newcastle-under-Lyme to coal mine engineer George Homfray and his wife Marion, née Block. She studied chemistry under William Ramsay.

In 1904, she collaborated with Philippe A. Guye at the University of Geneva on surface tension studies and molar refractivity. Later, she studied the absorption of gases including nitrogen and helium by porous media.

In 1905, she received a BSc from University College, London, followed by a DSc in 1910.

Homfray was Treasurer of the Hampstead Liberal Association and ran as Liberal candidate for Hampstead in the 1928 and 1931 London County Council elections.

She died in 1948.

== Publications ==
- 'Molecular refractions of some liquid mixtures of constant boiling point', Journal of the Chemical Society, Transactions 87 (1905), 1430–43
- 'Molecular refractions of dimethylpryone and its allies and quadrivalency of oxygen', Journal of the Chemical Society, Transactions 87 (1905), 1443–61
- 'The relation between solubility and the physical state of the solvent in the case of the absorption of carbon dioxide in p-azoxyphenetole', Journal of the Chemical Society, Transactions 97 (1910), 1669–76
- 'Die Absorption von Gasen Durch Holzkohle', Zeitschrift für Physikalische Chemie: 74U:1 (1910), 129–201
