= Richard William Ford =

English solicitor and businessman

Richard William Ford (9 January 1822 – 1900) was a Portsmouth solicitor and businessman, and mayor (in 1864–65) and alderman of the city.

One of his sons was the lawyer and novelist Douglas Morey Ford. Other children were Charles (Lt. Col. 1845–1918), Archibald Henry (Architect, 1846–1930), Harriett (1847–1903), Annie Emma (1849), Richard McArthur (1850–1851), Edward Carrington (1853–1854), Arthur Vernon (Physician, 1854–1918), Emma Beatrice (1856–?) and Richard William (Gen. Kt. 1857–1925).
