= Clapton Girls' Academy =

Clapton Girls Academy
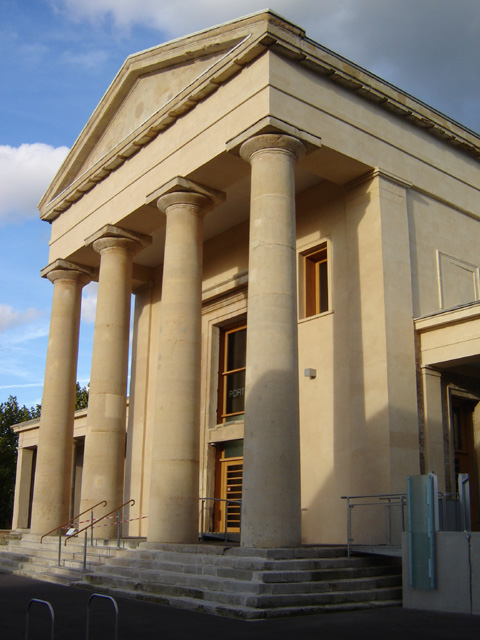

Location
- Laura Place, Lower Clapton Road; Lower Clapton, Greater London, E5 0RB; England; 51.55423°N 0.05197°W

Information
- Type: Academy
- Motto: Wisdom and Togetherness
- Established: 1906
- Department for Education URN: 137442 Tables
- Ofsted: Reports
- Head teacher: Anna Feltham
- Gender: Girls
- Age: 11 to 19
- Enrolment: 2,000+ pupils
- Colour: Purple 🟪
- Former name: John Howard School
- Website: https://www.claptongirlsacademy.com/

Clapton Girls' Academy (formerly Clapton Girls Technology College) is a secondary school with academy status located in Lower Clapton, in the London Borough of Hackney, London, England.

The school is situated on the A102 a few hundred metres west of Homerton University Hospital. It lies in the parish of St James, Clapton.

== Admissions ==
There are 900 pupils in the school. As Clapton Girls Technology College, the school was amongst the top 5% of schools that had improved nationally. More than half the pupils that attend are eligible for free school meals and under a third have special educational needs. More than 50 languages are spoken at the school and 70% of the pupils hold English as an additional language.

== History ==
The school is located in Laura Place, on the site occupied by Newcome's School, a fashionable boys' school, from the early 18th century until 1815, and occupied after 1825 by the London Orphan Asylum.

=== Grammar school ===
On 21 September 1906 the County Secondary School for Girls, South Hackney, opened on Cassland Road in Hackney. In May 1916 it moved to Laura Place and changed its name to Clapton County Secondary School for Girls. In September 1939, owing to the outbreak of the Second World War, the school was evacuated to Bishop's Stortford in Hertfordshire. The school referred to as the Laura Place evening school was used for music classes during the war.

In 1947 the school was renamed the John Howard School, after the 18th-century prison reformer John Howard, and had around 450 girls. The school motto Possunt Quia Posse Videntur, commonly translated as "they can because they think they can", was adopted in 1954, and Queen Elizabeth The Queen Mother paid a visit to the school in 1966.

=== Comprehensive ===
In 1977 the school absorbed Clapton Park School, a secondary modern school with 1,000 girls on Chelmer Road in Homerton, and adopted the motto Wisdom and Togetherness. It became a comprehensive school for girls aged 11–16. In 1999 the school was awarded Technology College status and changed its name to Clapton Girls Technology College. The former Clapton Park School, located off Glyn Road near Homerton University Hospital, has since been turned into flats.

In June 2008 Clapton Girls Technology College achieved an "outstanding" Ofsted report. Following a subject inspection in December 2006, the Mathematics Department was also deemed to be "outstanding". SATs and GCSE results improved significantly after the school became a Technology College in 1999. The school also became a Leading Edge Partnership school, and its leadership and management were also recognised in an Investors in People assessment in 2007.

The school site was transformed under the Building Schools for the Future programme, with new and refurbished buildings, as well as landscaped grounds. The school received many awards in recognition of the education delivered, including Artsmark Gold and Inclusion Quality Mark, and the status of Healthy Schools and International Schools.

The Clapton Girls Technology College sixth form opened in 2007. From September 2010 it has operated in collaboration with the sixth form at Our Lady's Convent Roman Catholic High School, giving the opportunity for an increased course offer.

=== Academy ===
On 1 September 2011 the school formally gained academy status and changed its name to Clapton Girls' Academy.

== Academic performance ==
In the year 2006, 59% of the pupils left with 5 A*–C compared to 34% in 2002. The year 11 Class of 2010 have also received the highest target ever set for year 11 pupils in the history of the school.

It gets GCSE and A-level results slightly above the England average.

In 2013, 71% of pupils left with 5 A*–C including English and Maths. This was a new school record. It had also been inspected by Ofsted earlier that year and was said to be outstanding in all areas.

== Notable former pupils ==
=== John Howard School ===
- Beatrice Serota, Baroness Serota (1919—2002), politician
- Josephine Wagerman (1933–2018), teacher and first woman President of the Board of Deputies of British Jews

=== Clapton Park School ===
- Helen Shapiro (b. 1946), singer
