= Benita Armstrong =

British sculptor (1907–2004)

Benita Eleanora Armstrong, née Benita Jaeger later The Lady Strauss, (1907–2004) was a British sculptor known for her bronze figurative work.

== Biography ==
Armstrong was born into a Jewish family in Germany and moved to London in 1926. In London she lived in a flat above a restaurant in Charlotte Street and for several years was in a relationship with Clive Bell. After that relationship ended she met and, in 1932, married the British artist John Armstrong. Benita Armstrong studied under the Viennese sculptor Georg Ehrlich and was a frequent participant in group exhibitions in London and elsewhere as well as regularly having work included in the Royal Academy Summer Exhibitions. A solo exhibition of her work was held at the Drian Galleries in London in 1981. She and Armstrong separated and she eventually went on to have two children with the Labour Party politician George Strauss, whom she married following the death of Strauss's first wife Patricia in 1987.
