= Charles Ford (British politician) =

Liberal politician in London

Lt-Col Charles Ford VD (1845 – 4 February 1918) was a Liberal politician in the United Kingdom. He was a Progressive member of the London County Council from 1892 to 1901.

== Early life ==
Ford was born in 1845, the son of Richard William Ford, Mayor of Portsmouth in 1864-65, and his wife Emma (née Low). He was baptised at St John's Chapel, Portsea on 25 May 1845.

He was educated at Portsmouth Grammar School and the Naval College in Gosport. A younger brother was the novelist Douglas Morey Ford.

== Career ==
Ford was a solicitor. He served in the 4th Volunteer Battalion, Essex Regiment, retiring in 1891 as an Honorary Lt Col. He was awarded the VD in 1892. He received an award from the Royal Humane Society for saving a life at sea.

== Political career ==
Ford was one of the two (both unsuccessful) Liberal candidates for the 2-member electorate of Devonport in the 1886 general election. He was a Progressive (ie Liberal) candidate for the seat of Lambeth North for the 1889 elections to the London County Council, but narrowly failed to be elected. In 1892 he stood again, and was successful, and was re-elected in 1895 and 1898.

It was Ford who first proposed, in 1898, that Lambeth Palace Field become a public park. In 1901 the re-named Archbishop's Park was opened to the public.

The explorer Henry Morton Stanley, standing as a Liberal Unionist, had narrowly defeated the Liberal candidate for Lambeth North in the 1895 general election. Stanley announced in 1898 that he would not stand in the 1900 general election and the Liberal and Radical Association adopted Ford as its candidate. Although Ford had been an imperial volunteer in the Boer War, he lost the 1900 'Khaki election'.

== Personal life ==
Ford died in 1918, aged 72, and is commemorated by a memorial in Portsmouth Cathedral. He was unmarried.
