= Douglas Morey Ford =

English lawyer and novelist

- Born: 1851; Portsmouth
- Died: 12 May 1916 (aged 64–65)
- Occupations: Lawyer, author
- Known for: A Time of Terror: The Story of a Great Revenge (A.D. 1910) (1906); The Raid of Dover: A Romance of the Reign of Woman: A.D. 1940 (1910)
- Spouse: Honor Blanche Barnard

Douglas Morey Ford (1851 – 12 May 1916) was an English lawyer and novelist who is best known for his two late works of speculative fiction, A Time of Terror (1906) that dealt with anarchist attacks on the British government, and The Raid of Dover (1910) which imagined the rule of Britain by women accompanied by invasion and natural disasters.

== Early life and family ==
Douglas Morey Ford was born in 1851 in Portsmouth, the son of the businessman and solicitor Richard William Ford and his wife Emma.

His siblings were Charles (Lt. Col. 1845–1918), Archibald Henry (Architect, 1846–1930), Harriett (1847–1903), Annie Emma (1849), Richard McArthur (1850–1851), Edward Carrington (1853–1854), Arthur Vernon (Physician, 1854–1918), Emma Beatrice (1856–?) and Richard William (Gen. Kt. 1857–1925).

He married Honor Blanche Barnard in 1876. Honor was known for her interest in spiritualism and the writer Arthur Conan Doyle, physician in Portsmouth and creator of Sherlock Holmes, may have attended a séance at Ford's house around 1885. In 1901 the family were living in Croydon and Ford and his wife had two sons and seven daughters. They employed a governess and two servants.

== Career ==
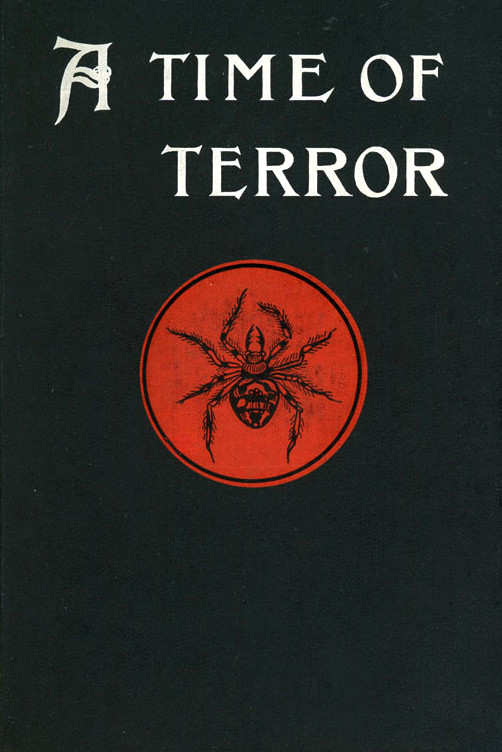
Cover of A Time of Terror, 1906

Ford entered the legal profession and wrote a number of legal textbooks. He also wrote novels including two works of speculative fiction, A Time of Terror: The Story of a Great Revenge (A.D. 1910) (1906) and The Raid of Dover: A Romance of the Reign of Woman: A.D. 1940 (1910).

In A Time of Terror, a group of anarchists known as the League of London fight the British government and only fail to overthrow the government due to the outbreak of war with Germany. Lyman Tower Sargent described the novel as containing themes of the corruption of the legal system, anti-socialism, and anti-women's rights. In The Raid of Dover, Britain is ruled by women and is invaded by Germany which is accompanied by natural disasters such as earthquakes and volcanic eruptions.

== Death ==
Ford died at Tutshill, Chepstow, on 12 May 1916. His address at the time of his death was Clarence House, Tunbridge Wells. Probate was granted to Dorothy Christian Thompson, wife of Cecil Charles Brandon Thompson, on an estate of £455.

== Selected publications ==
=== Legal ===
- Solicitors as Advocates: Practical Suggestions in Connection with Proceedings Before Stipendiary Magistrates and Justices of the Peace, Actions in County Courts, Coroner's Inquests, Courts-martial, Etc. With Observations on the Law and Practice in the Above Courts. Shaw and Sons, London, 1881.
- Matrimonial Law, and the Guardianship of Infants: comprising the Matrimonial Causes Acts, 1857 to 1884; ... also the Married Women (maintenance in case of desertion) Act, 1886; and the Guardianship of Infants Act, 1886, with the Rules of Court (1887) and explanatory notes. W. Clowes & Sons, London, 1888.
- The Law of Briefs and Manual of Forensic Fees. 3rd edition. King, Sell & Olding, London, [1904]. Introduction by James Andrew Strahan (1858–1930).

=== Novels ===
- Old as the Hills: A Novel. Tinsley Brothers, London, 1871.
- Kate Savage: A Novel. Charing Cross Publishing Co., London, 1873.
- Martindale's Money (serialized in St. James's Magazine in 1878)
- A Time of Terror: The Story of a Great Revenge (A.D. 1910). Greening & Co., London, 1906. Reprinted as A Time of Terror: The Story of a Great Revenge (A.D. 1912) by Hurst & Blackett, London, 1908.
- The Raid of Dover: A Romance of the Reign of Woman: A.D. 1940. King, Sell, & Olding, London, 1910.

== See also ==
- Invasion literature
