= Josephine Wagerman =

British teacher and Jewish leader (1933–2018)

Josephine Miriam Wagerman OBE (née Barbanel; 17 September 1933 – 16 October 2018) was a British teacher and Jewish leader.

She was born in London, the eldest child of Emmanuel Barbanel, a tailor's presser, and his wife Jane (née Limberg), a waitress. She went to John Howard Grammar School, now the Clapton Girls' Academy, and graduated from Birkbeck College, University of London, in 1955, later earning an MA in Education at the University’s Institute of Education.

She was President of the Board of Deputies of British Jews from 2000 to 2003, the first woman to lead the representative body. Her earlier career was as a history teacher, working at schools in London and Singapore. She was then Headteacher (the first woman in the role) of the Jews' Free School, London, from 1985 to 1993, and Chief Executive of Lennox Lewis College (founded by the eponymous boxer) from 1994 to 1996.

In the 1993 New Year Honours, Wagerman was appointed Officer of the Order of the British Empire (OBE) in recognition of her work as Headteacher of the Jews' Free School.

She married Peter Wagerman, a dental surgeon, in 1956. He died in 2016. They had a son and a daughter.
