= Lena Townsend =

British Conservative politician

Lena Moncrieff Townsend CBE (3 November 1911 – 17 November 2004) was a British Conservative politician in London and served briefly as Leader of the Inner London Education Authority.

She was born in Egypt, to an Irish father and a Scottish mother, both of whom were born in India. She studied at Oxford, and for a time worked as a fashion writer. She had three children.

During the Second World War she was an organiser for the Women's Voluntary Service and the Land Army. She married twice, firstly Henry Peat, and then John Townsend. In 1955 she was first elected to the London County Council for her home seat of Hampstead, and took a special interest in the Education Committee. She was chosen to be Leader of the Opposition on the Education Committee from the early 1960s.

Townsend was an unsuccessful candidate in the first Greater London Council election of 1964, being defeated in Camden. However, in 1967 she was more fortunate and won by about 4,000 votes. This brought with it membership of the LCC Education Committee's successor body, the Inner London Education Authority, and it was there that Townsend concentrated. The Conservatives had won narrow control of ILEA and Townsend ran for the Leadership, but lost to Christopher Chataway who was the preferred candidate of the Conservative Party nationally.

Chataway did make Townsend his Deputy, and Chairman of the Schools Committee. Townsend supported 'Schools Councils' for pupils to take some responsibility for the management of their schools. She was nominated as a member of the Race Relations Board Conciliation Committee for London in 1968. She was a founder member of the Conservative Group for Europe.

In 1969 Christopher Chataway was elected to Parliament in a byelection, and stepped down from the ILEA Leadership. Townsend was chosen as his successor, and largely continued his moderate policies. When Christian morality campaigner Mary Whitehouse attacked a BBC sex education film, Townsend defended it. She was however faced with a strike of teachers in November that year over a national pay claim.

Fighting for re-election in 1970, Townsend promoted the record of three years of Conservative ILEA by pointing to the success in reducing class sizes by employing more teachers. However, there was a small swing to Labour, who regained control; Townsend lost her seat in Camden but was elected as an Alderman to the GLC and co-opted to ILEA's Education Committee. She remained as Leader of the Opposition until February 1971 when she resigned, saying that she needed a paying job.

Townsend remained an Alderman of the GLC until 1977 when the Aldermanic system was abolished. She was a member of several bodies, most prominently as a Governor of the London College of Fashion (and Chair of Governors from 1967 to 1986). In Edward Heath's Dissolution Honours list of 1974 she was appointed a CBE. Keeping the links with the country of her birth, she was President of the Anglo-Egyptian Association from 1961 until it was wound up in 1987.

Preceded by Christopher Chataway	Leader of the Inner London Education Authority; 1969–1970	Succeeded by Ashley Bramall
