= Jonathan Cape =

English publishing firm

- Parent company: Penguin Random House
- Founded: 1921; 105 years ago
- Founder: Herbert Jonathan Cape, Wren Howard
- Country of origin: United Kingdom
- Headquarters location: London, England
- Publication types: Books
- Official website: www.penguin.co.uk/company/publishers/vintage/jonathan-cape.html

Jonathan Cape is a British publishing firm headquartered in London, founded in 1921 by Herbert Jonathan Cape and Wren Howard. It is now an imprint of Penguin Random House.

Cape and his business partner Wren Howard (1893–1968) set up the publishing house in 1921. They established a reputation for high-quality design and production and a fine list of English-language authors, fostered by the firm's editor and reader Edward Garnett. Cape's list of writers ranged from poets including Robert Frost and C. Day Lewis, to children's authors such as Roald Dahl, Hugh Lofting and Arthur Ransome, to James Bond novels by Ian Fleming, to heavyweight fiction by James Joyce and T. E. Lawrence.

After Cape's death, the firm later merged successively with three other London publishing houses. In 1987 it was taken over by Random House. Its name continues as one of Random House's British imprints.

== Cape – biography ==
=== Early years ===
Jonathan Cape in the late 1950s

Herbert Jonathan Cape was born in Fulham, then in the Middlesex part of the Metropolis, on 15 November 1879, the youngest of the seven children of Jonathan Cape, a clerk from Ireby in what is now Cumbria, and his wife Caroline, née Page. He received a basic schooling; in his early teens, Cape was taken on by Hatchards bookshop in Piccadilly as an errand-boy.

Four years later, in 1899, Cape joined the London office of the American publishers Harper and Brothers, where he worked, successively, as a clerk, general utility man and travelling salesman, first in the provinces and later in London. In 1904 he joined the publishing house of Duckworth as London traveller, and from 1911 as manager. In 1914, on the outbreak of the Great War, he took over the sole charge of the business when the proprietor, Gerald Duckworth, was absent on war duties. In 1915, Duckworth returned. In December of that year Cape joined the army, serving for the rest of the war.

Cape returned to Duckworth in 1918. In 1920, he was appointed manager of the Medici Society, known mainly for publishing prints of paintings but with a small list of books. While in this post he met George Wren Howard, 14 years his junior, who was learning the publishing trade at the Medici Society. Cape's biographer (and sometimes junior partner) Rupert Hart-Davis writes:

Cape quickly saw that Howard had a fine sense of design in book production, as well as a good business head; the two became friends and allies. After some months they decided that there was no future for them where they were, and that they had better start a new firm of their own.

=== Independent publisher ===
Howard was able to raise money from his family. Cape, with no such option, raised his share of the starting capital by selling cheap paperback reprints of novels by Elinor Glyn. Duckworth held the rights to her books, but did not wish to issue cut-price editions; Cape negotiated the rights in early 1920 and successfully issued the paperbacks under the imprint Page & Co. With just enough starting capital, the firm of Jonathan Cape began trading on 1 January 1921 at 11 Gower Street, Bloomsbury.

Cape and Howard recruited Edward Garnett as their editor and reader. Garnett, described by The Times as "the prince of publisher's readers," remained with the firm until his death in 1937. Each of the three principals brought his own contribution to the firm's success: Cape was experienced in publishing; Howard ensured high quality design and production; and Garnett was given the freedom to foster talent and build up a fine publishing list. Hart-Davis credits Garnett's literary judgment and Howard's production with gaining the firm an "outstanding reputation for quality during the next two decades".

The firm's first publication was widely regarded as a gamble: Cape published a new two-volume edition, at the high price of nine guineas, of C. M. Doughty's Travels in Arabia Deserta. The book, first published in 1888 with no success, had been out of print for 30 years. The Cape edition sold out and had to be reprinted several times. Among those who admired it was T. E. Lawrence, who became friendly with Cape, and wrote an introduction to the firm's 1926 single-volume edition of the book. Jonathan Cape Ltd became Lawrence's publishers, issuing Revolt in the Desert (1927), Seven Pillars of Wisdom (1935), and The Mint (1955).

In 1922, Cape took over the small publishing house A. C. Fifield, acquiring the rights to works by such authors as H. G. Wells, W. H. Davies, Sidney Webb and Samuel Butler. Cape was among the first British publishers to seek out American authors. Hart-Davis notes that the firm recruited three future Nobel Prize-winners – Sinclair Lewis, Ernest Hemingway, and Eugene O'Neill – as well as many other American writers including H. L. Mencken, Robert Frost, and Margaret Mead. British and other European authors published by Cape included H. E. Bates, Peter Fleming, Robert Graves, Christopher Isherwood, James Joyce, Malcolm Lowry, André Maurois, Douglas Reed, and Henry Williamson. The firm's best-sellers included Arthur Ransome's adventure books, Hugh Lofting's Doctor Dolittle stories, and most profitable of all, Ian Fleming's James Bond series.

Cape opened an American publishing house in 1929, first in partnership with Harrison Smith and later with Robert Ballou. The firm was not successful and went bankrupt in 1932.

=== Marriage and family ===
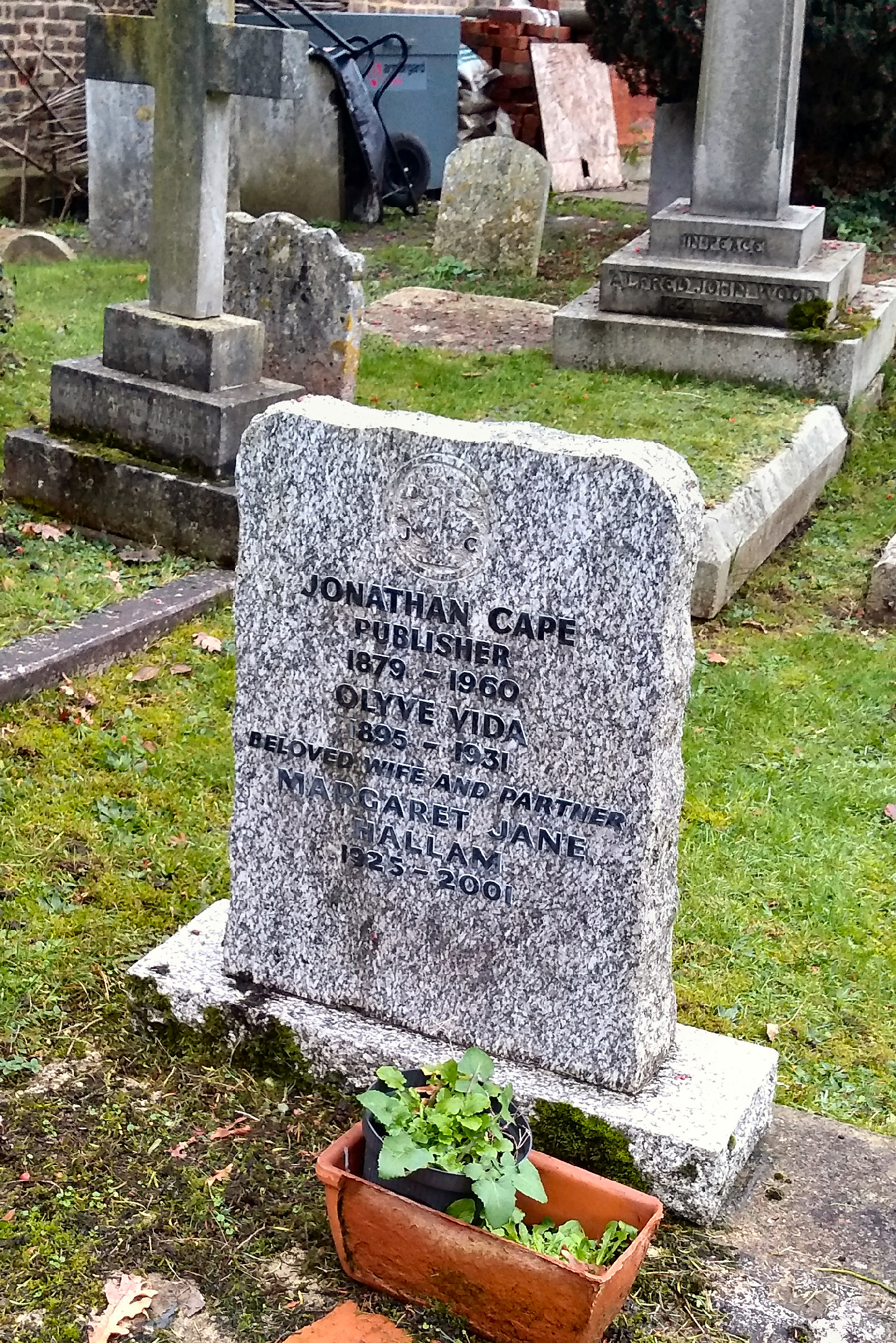
Jonathan Cape's grave at St Peter's Church, Petersham

Cape was three times married and three times widowed. In 1907 he married Edith Louisa Creak, with whom he had two daughters. Edith Cape died in 1919. In 1927 Cape married Olyve Vida James, with whom he had a son and a daughter; Olyve Cape died in 1931. In 1941 he married Kathleen Mary Webb, with whom he had a son; Kathleen Cape died in 1953.

Cape suffered two strokes in 1954, which impaired his speech, but he fought his way back to health. He was still running the firm when he celebrated his 80th birthday in November 1959. He died suddenly at his London flat on 10 February 1960. He was buried at St Peter's Church, Petersham.

== The firm after Cape ==
From 1960, the publishing house was headed by Tom Maschler for more than three decades. As the 1960s progressed, the firm successfully courted and published authors who were representative of the age, including the Beatle John Lennon, and the former "angry young man" Kingsley Amis. Cape also signed up Len Deighton, whose series of spy novels was a gritty alternative to the far-fetched adventures of James Bond. In the 1970s, Cape published popular authors in many genres, including the novelists J. G. Ballard and Salman Rushdie, and the children's writer Roald Dahl. One of their freelance cover artists was Bill Botten.

A defensive merger with Chatto and Windus was carried out in 1969; and The Bodley Head and Virago Press were added to the group. In 1987 Cape was taken over and became an imprint of Random House.

As of 2019, Jonathan Cape is an imprint of Vintage Publishing UK.

== Book series ==
- Academy Books
- Anglo-Swedish Literary Foundation (edition)
- Bedford Historical Series
- Bedford Series of Economic Handbooks
- Canopus in Argos: Archives
- Cape Editions
- Cape Poetry
- Cape Poetry Paperbacks
- Essential Series
- The Famous Twins
- Flexibles
- Florin Book Series
- The Gentle Revolution Series
- Half-Crown Fiction (series)
- Jackdaws
- Life and Colour Series
- Life and Letters Series
- Little Books
- Jonathan Cape Paperbacks
- The Men Who Ruled India
- The New Library
- New Play Series
- Novels of To-day
- Odyssey Library
- The Saint Giles Library
- Swallows and Amazons
- The Travellers' Guides
- The Travellers' Library
- Writings of the Left (series editor: Ralph Miliband) - also published in the United States by Grove Press/Evergreen
- Writings on British History (for the Royal Historical Society)

== See also ==
- Graham C. Greene (managing director of Jonathan Cape from 1962 to 1990)
- Tom Maschler
