= Will Lockyer =

British politician and trade unionist

William Lockyer (1875 – 19 February 1959) was a British politician and trade unionist, who served on the London County Council.

Born in Lambeth, Lockyer came to prominence as the chair of the Postmen's Federation from 1904. He supported the formation of a single union for post office staff, and chaired the conference which led the federation to merge with other unions, forming the Union of Post Office Workers. Lockyer served as the union's treasurer until he retired in 1935.

Lockyer was a supporter of the Labour Party, and in 1919 he was elected to Lambeth Borough Council, serving as Mayor of Lambeth from 1938 until 1945. At the 1937 London County Council election, he won a seat in Lambeth North, and he served until 1949.

Lockyer was made a Freeman of the City of London, and also a Deputy Lieutenant of the County of London.

Trade union offices
Preceded by New position	Treasurer of the Union of Post Office Workers; 1919–1935	Succeeded by W. T. Leicester
Civic offices
Preceded by William Hunter	Mayor of Lambeth; 1938–1945	Succeeded by Albert Deady
