= Charles Gibson (British politician) =

British politician (1889–1977)

Charles William Gibson (7 April 1889 – 22 March 1977) was a British Labour Party politician.

At the 1945 general election, he was returned as Member of Parliament for Kennington. When that constituency was abolished for the 1950 general election, he was elected for the Clapham constituency. He held that seat until the 1959 election, when he was defeated by the Conservative candidate Alan Glyn. OutLine of his Political Career Member Independent Labour Party & Labour Party (1909–1964) Member of the Lambeth Borough Council (1918–1931) Member of Parliament for Kennington (1945–1949) Member of Parliament for Clapham (1949–1959) Member of London County Council (1928–1964), representing Vauxhall Treasurer of the Trade union group of Labour MPs (1951–1964) Member of the Estimates Committee of the House of Commons (1958–1964) Vice-Chair of LCC Housing Committee (1934–1939) Chair of LCC Housing Committee (1943–1950) Justice of the Peace (1944–1964)

Parliament of the United Kingdom
Preceded by John Wilmot	Member of Parliament for Kennington; 1945 – 1950	Constituency abolished
Preceded by John Battley	Member of Parliament for Clapham; 1950 – 1959	Succeeded by Alan Glyn
