= Beatrice Serota, Baroness Serota =

British minister

The Right Honourable The Baroness Serota DBE
- Serota in 1969 by Godfrey Argent

Member of the House of Lords
- Lord Temporal
- Life peerage 20 January 1967 – 21 October 2002

Baroness-in-Waiting Government Whip
- In office 23 April 1968 – 25 February 1969
- Prime Minister: Harold Wilson
- Preceded by: The Lord Sorensen
- Succeeded by: The Baroness Llewelyn-Davies of Hastoe

Personal details
- Born: 15 October 1919
- Died: 21 October 2002 (aged 83)
- Party: Labour
- Education: John Howard Grammar School for Girls; London School of Economics

Beatrice Serota, Baroness Serota, DBE (née Katz; 15 October 1919 – 21 October 2002) was a British Government minister and a Deputy Speaker of the House of Lords.

== Early life ==
Beatrice Katz was brought up in the East End of London, the daughter of Jewish refugees from central Europe. She was nicknamed "Bea" or "Bee" from an early age.

== Career ==
She joined the Civil Service in 1941 and worked in the crucial Ministry of Fuel and Power through the difficult years of the Second World War until 1946.

Harold Wilson appointed her as a Government Whip almost immediately and then proposed her for the sensitive post of deputy to Richard Crossman, having refused to promote Roy Hattersley, whom he suspected of disloyalty. She had never been an MP herself, but became a thoroughly competent administrator. She had been a member of the old Hampstead Borough Council immediately after the Second World War and subsequently served successively on the London County Council, as a member for Brixton, and the Greater London Council, as the member for Lambeth. Until the end of her life she was devoted to Hampstead.

She became a Chief Whip when she was on the GLC, a post that would stand her in good stead later. She was vice-chairwoman of the Inner London Education Authority, holding this post for three years until 1967. It was her distinguished career in local government and the work that she did for children which brought her the recognition of a seat in the House of Lords as a recognised authority on the subject. Serota chaired the LCC children's committee for seven years, and was a member of the Central Training Council for Child Care for a least nine years.

Serota was chair of the advisory council on the penal system, and the first ombudsman for local government. She was a member of the Community Relations Commission and the BBC Complaints Commission and a BBC Governor. She served on the Longford Committee on Crime and on the Latey Committee, which led to the lowering of the age of majority to 18. In the House of Lords, she became a Deputy Speaker in 1985, and then the principal deputy chairwoman of committees.

== Education ==
Serota was educated at John Howard Grammar School for Girls and at the LSE, where she read economics and in 1976 she became an honorary fellow.

== Personal life ==
Her future husband, Stanley Serota, whose family had come from Russia, lived next door; they were married in 1942. He qualified as a civil engineer.

Serota had two children. Her son, Sir Nicholas Serota, was born in 1946. He later became the director of the Tate Gallery. Her daughter, Judith, was born in 1948 and later pursued a career in the arts.

== Honours ==
On 20 January 1967, she was created a life peer as Baroness Serota, of Hampstead in Greater London.

In 1992 Baroness Serota was appointed a Dame Commander of the Order of the British Empire (DBE).

Political offices
Preceded by The Lord Sorenson	Baroness-in-Waiting; 1968–1969	Succeeded by The Baroness Llewelyn-Davies
