= Lewen Sharp =

British architect

Lewen Sharp

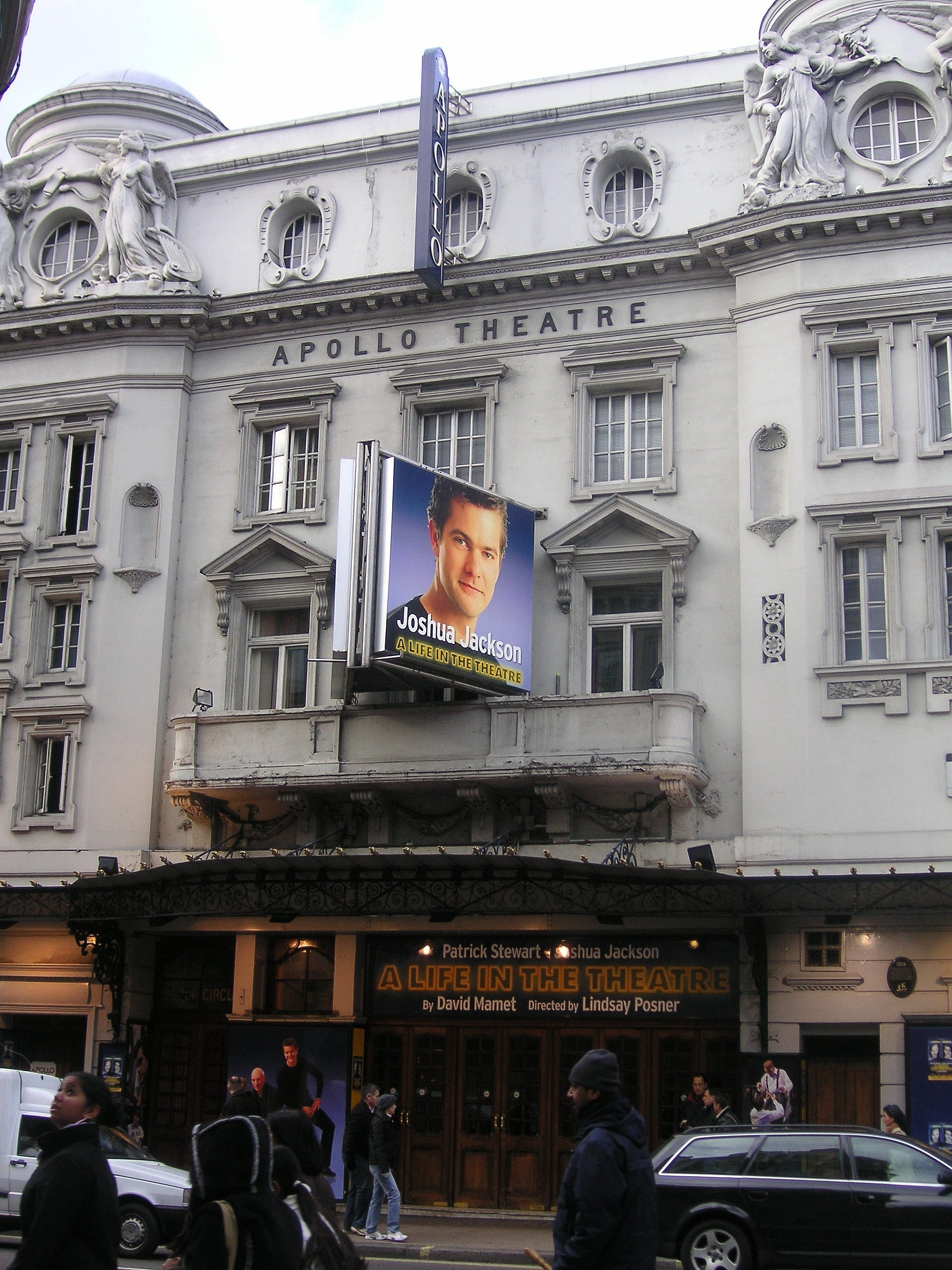
Apollo Theatre, Shaftesbury Avenue, London (2005)

Lewen Sharp (sometimes Lewin) was a British architect.

In 1901, Sharp designed the Apollo Theatre, on London's Shaftesbury Avenue for Henry Lowenfeld.

In 1908, Sharp made major alterations to the Camberwell Palace.
