= John Thomas Taylor (British Museum) =

John Thomas Taylor (1840–1908) was an English British Museum official, and local politician of the London County Council.

== Early life ==
He was the son of Thomas and Arabella Collie Taylor. His father was a successful farmer at Cuckney, in Nottinghamshire. His mother started a preparatory school in Belper, Derbyshire, at Green Hall, built by the Strutt family. She died there in 1887. Taylor's sister was there, at the time of his death in 1908. This was the Green Hall Preparatory School, Miss Taylor head, admission to sons of professional men.

== Education and career ==
Taylor was privately educated. He joined the British Museum in 1861. He was made assistant secretary in 1878, retiring in that post in 1903. During 1880 to 1884, he supervised the move of the museum's collections to the Natural History Museum, London. He was awarded the Imperial Service Order in the first list, of 1902.

== Local politician ==
After his retirement in 1903, Taylor was elected in 1904 to the London County Council, for the two-member Hampstead constituency, representing the Moderates with Nicholas Hanhart. Re-elected in 1907, he became chairman of the Council's Education Committee.

== Death ==
Taylor died 14 September 1908.

== Works ==
Taylor edited for publication a facsimile of an indulgence of Pope Leo X, shortly after the British Museum acquired a copy.

== Family ==
Taylor married, firstly, in 1868, Ellen Feild, daughter of the Rev. Samuel Hands Feild of Macclesfield. He married in 1879, as his second wife, Mary Adshead, daughter of William Adshead of Lark Hall, Macclesfield.
