= Melvill Beachcroft =

British politician and mountain climber (1846–1926)

Sir Melvill Beachcroft
- Born: Richard Melvill Beachcroft; 22 January 1846; Hampstead, Middlesex, England
- Died: 11 January 1926 (aged 79); Cookham Dean, Berkshire, England
- Occupation(s): Politician, mountain climber

Sir Richard Melvill Beachcroft (22 January 1846 – 11 January 1926) was a British politician and mountain climber.

== Early life and education ==
Beachcroft was born in Hampstead, the eldest son of solicitor Richard Thomas Beachcroft and Henrietta Melvill. His mother was the eldest child of Sir James Cosmo Melvill and sister of Sir William Henry Melvill.

He was educated at Harrow School.

== Career ==
Beachcroft became a solicitor in 1868. He later served as solicitor to Christ's Hospital. He was elected at the 1889 London County Council election, joining the Moderate group on the new council. From 1892 to 1898, he was instead an alderman on the council, and he served as deputy chairman in 1896, vice chairman in 1897, and chairman in 1909/10.

The Moderate group was superseded by the Conservative Party group, of which Beachcroft was recognised as leader for a time around the 1904 London County Council election. From 1903 to 1908, he also served as the founding chairman of the Metropolitan Water Board.

In December 1904, he was knighted by King Edward VII.

== Personal life and death ==
Beachcroft married Charlotte Emily Bonner-Maurice in 1877. There were no children.

In his spare time, Beachcroft was an early Alpinist. He first travelled to the Alps in 1864 with Douglas Freshfield, and, in 1877, he climbed the Matterhorn. He was also active in the Alpine Club, and served on its committee from 1889 to 1891. In addition, he served as Master of the Clothworkers' Company in 1913/14.

Beachcroft died in Cookham Dean, Berkshire, on 11 January 1926, aged 79.

Civic offices
Preceded by New position	Chairman of the Metropolitan Water Board; 1903–1908	Succeeded by Edmund Broughton Barnard
Preceded by Richard Robinson	Chairman of the London County Council; 1909–1910	Succeeded by William Whitaker Thompson
