= 1931 London County Council election =

1931 local election in England

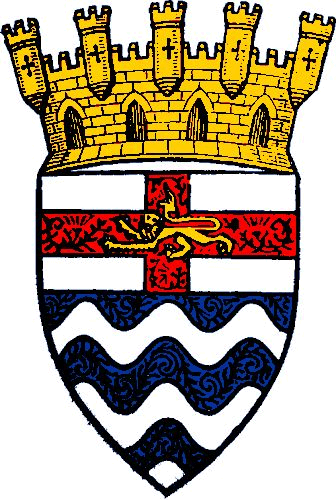
- 5 March 1931
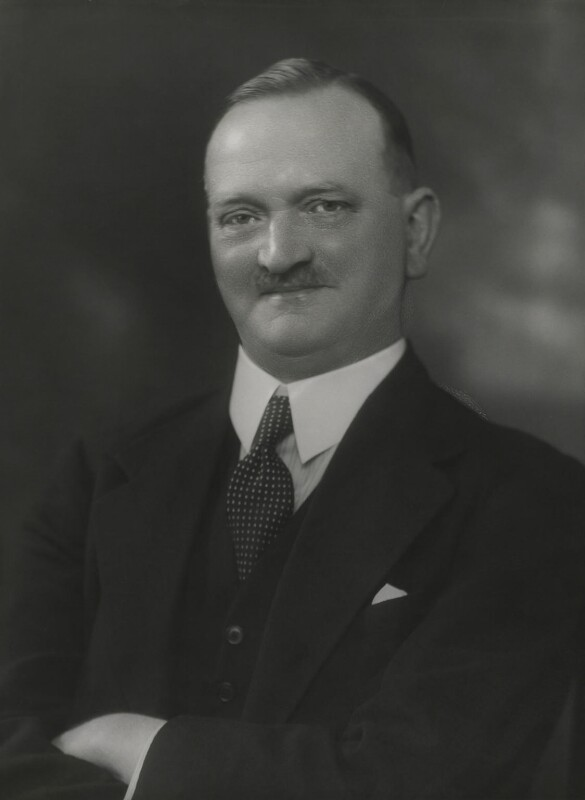

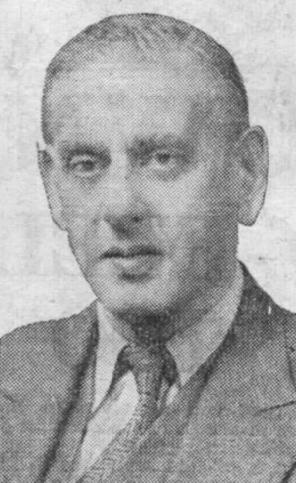

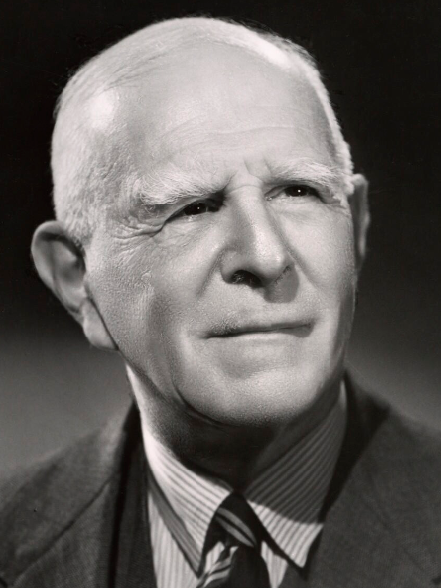
	First party	Second party	Third party
Leader	William Ray	Lewis Silkin	Percy Harris
Party	Municipal Reform	Labour	Liberal
Leader since	1925	1930
Leader's seat	Hackney Central	Southwark South East	Bethnal Green South West
Last election	77	42	5
Seats won	83	35	6
Seat change	▲6	▼7	▲1
Popular vote	270,655	214,256	30,915
Percentage	50.0%	39.6%	5.7%

An election to the County Council of London took place on 5 March 1931. The council was elected by First Past the Post with each elector having two votes in the two-member seats. The Municipal Reform Party slightly increased its majority on the council, with overall results matching those from 1925.

== Campaign ==
The Municipal Reform Party had run the council since 1907. The party campaigned on its record in government, contending that it had run the council economically, keeping rates low. Since the previous election, the council had gained the power to administer welfare benefits, and the Municipal Reformers argued that the Labour Party would practice "Poplarism" and be overly generous. The party stood 106 candidates, and won the seats in City of London, Kensington South, Paddington South, Westminster Abbey and Westminster St George's without facing a contest.

The Labour Party argued that welfare was administered in a harsh and cruel manner. It also contended that the Municipal Reform Party had not constructed houses for workers, and supported a government scheme for a board with oversight of traffic control in the city. The Manchester Guardian noted that Labour did not expect to take control of the council, as it was losing ground nationally. Other than the uncontested seats, the party stood everywhere except Chelsea and Hampstead, while it had only a single candidate in Stoke Newington.

The Liberal Party released a pamphlet putting forward ideas on housing, education, traffic, and the rating of land values. The Municipal Reform Party and the Liberal Party had a limited pact, with the two jointly backing anti-socialist candidates in Hackney South and the three divisions of Southwark. In the two divisions of Bethnal Green, and in Lambeth North, the Municipal Reformers backed the Liberal candidates. The Times noted that the Liberals were planning a much smaller campaign than in 1928, due to their losses that year, and a shortage of funds. The party stood only 27 candidates, down from 82 in 1928.

The Communist Party of Great Britain stood 14 candidates, and also backed six "Organised Unemployed" candidates in the three Southwark constituencies.

== Result ==
The Times noted that "rarely has an election of such importance caused so few changes". The Municipal Reformers made limited gains, taking the Liberal seat in Hackney Central, and Labour seats in Hammersmith North, Islington South, Kennington, Peckham and St Pancras South East. Labour's vote fell, but the party gained seats in Islington East and Mile End, while the Liberal Party gained seats from Labour in Lambeth North. The Communist Party of Great Britain performed poorly. Former Member of Parliament Shapurji Saklatvala took only 728 votes for the party in Battersea North.

The numbers of seats won by each party matched exactly the results of the 1925 London County Council election.

Party	Votes			Seats	
Party	Number	%	Stood	Seats	%
Municipal Reform	270,655	50.0	106	83	66.9
Labour	214,256	39.6	104	35	28.2
Liberal	30,915	5.7	27	6	4.8
Anti-Socialist	20,815		8	0	0.0
Independent	9,441		7	0	0.0
Ratepayers	5,440		2	0	0.0
Communist	4,608		14	0	0.0
Democratic	994		2	0	0.0
Organised Unemployed	987		6	0	0.0
