= 1904 London County Council election =

Local election in England

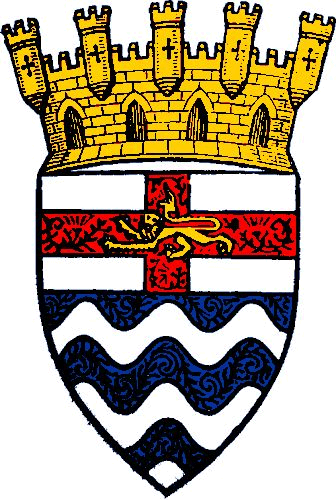
- 5 March 1904
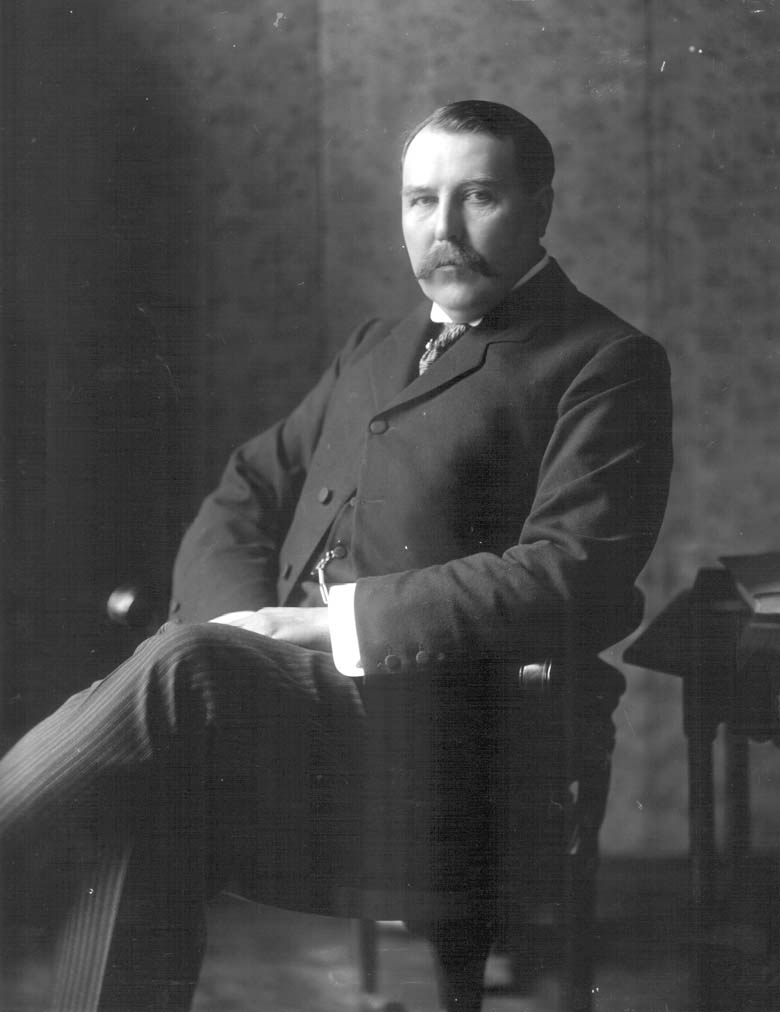
	First party	Second party
Leader	McKinnon Wood	Melvill Beachcroft
Party	Progressive	Conservative
Leader since	1898	1901
Leader's seat	Alderman	Paddington North
Seats won	83	34
Seat change	▼1	▲3
Popular vote	165,536	143,863
Percentage	51.5%	44.7%

An election to the County Council of London took place on 5 March 1904. The council was elected by First Past the Post with each elector having two votes in the two-member seats. The Progressive Party retained control of the council, with a slightly reduced majority.

== Campaign ==
Since the 1901 London County Council election, the electorate for the council had increased by 19,221, the increase being in the outlying boroughs, while most inner city boroughs lost voters. Turnout was also reported as being higher in the outer boroughs. All the seats were contested other than Deptford and Greenwich, which were held uncontested by the Progressive Party.

The main issue at the election was education policy, as the London School Board was to be abolished and its powers absorbed by the council. The Times argued that the Conservative Party candidates had undoubted loyalty to the Church of England, whereas the Progressive Party candidates might have sympathy towards dissenters. Other issues were the attitude of candidates towards the employment of Chinese immigrants in South Africa, and the purchase of the county council of some rails manufactured in Belgium.

== Result ==
The Progressive Party lost one seat, while the Municipal Reform Party gained four, and independents fell from four seats to one. Nine members of the School Board won seats on the new council.

Party	Votes			Seats	
Party	Number	%	Stood	Seats	%
Progressive	165,536	51.5	114	83	▼1
Conservative	143,863	44.7	105	34	▲3
Independent			8	1	
Independent Progressive			4	0	
Labour	8,596	2.7	2	0	
