= 1925 London County Council election =

Local election in England

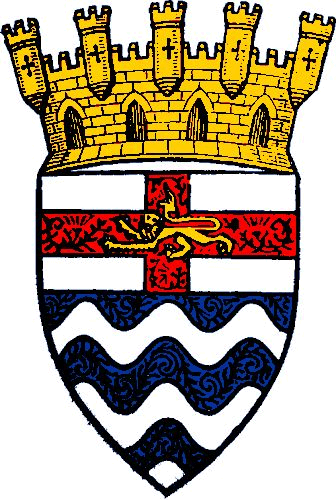
- 5 March 1925

	First party	Second party	Third party
Leader	George Hume	Emil Davies	John Scott Lidgett
Party	Municipal Reform	Labour	Progressive
Leader since	1917	1924	1918
Leader's seat	Alderman	Alderman	Alderman
Last election	82	17	26
Seats won	83	35	6
Seat change	▲1	▲18	▼19
Popular vote	276,111	233,156	55,586
Percentage	48.4%	40.8%	9.7%

An election to the County Council of London took place on 5 March 1925. The council was elected by First Past the Post with each elector having two votes in the two-member seats. The Municipal Reform Party retained a large majority, while the Labour Party established itself as the principal opposition, supplanting the Progressive Party.

== Campaign ==
The Municipal Reform Party campaigned on its record in office, noting that it had reduced rates, and built housing. It opposed compulsory education for children over 14 years old and promised "patriotic education", and claimed that the Labour Party would introduce "communist schemes... under the revolutionary red flag". It stood 112 candidates, and those in the City of London, Kensington South and Streatham were elected without facing a contest. The Times predicted that the party could gain seats in Bow and Bromley, Kennington and Shoreditch.

The Labour Party's manifesto proposed a major programme of municipalisation, including transport, power, lighting, water, slaughterhouses, and the supply of milk and coal. It also proposed establishing a municipal bank, rating based on land values, the construction of new bridges and tunnels to cross the Thames, and the establishment of tourist offices around the country, to encourage visitors to the city. The party stood 112 candidates, who included 27 of the 49 women contesting the election. The Times believed it might gain seats in Camberwell North West, Deptford, Limehouse and Mile End.

The Progressive Party's leader, John Scott Lidgett, argued for the training of more skilled building workers, with the long-term aim of constructing more workers' housing. The party established unofficial pacts with the Municipal Reformers in some seats, and itself stood only 41 candidates. Unable to win a majority of the council, it hoped after the election to hold the balance of power.

No minor parties contested the election, but four independent candidates stood.

== Results ==
The Municipal Reform Party maintained a large majority on the council, gaining one seat in Kennington from Labour, and six seats from the Progressives, doing particularly well in the Islington seats.

Labour gained thirteen seats from the Progressives, and six from the Municipal Reformers, more than doubling its representation, and for the first time becoming the official opposition on the council. The Progressive Party failed to make any gains, and lost 19 of its 25 seats, a situation which the Manchester Guardian blamed on its lack of distinctive policies, and its willingness in 1922 to form pacts with the Municipal Reformers. Women won 21 seats on the council, up from 13 at the previous election.

Party	Votes			Seats	
Party	Number	%	Stood	Seats	%
Municipal Reform	276,111	48.4	124	83	66.9
Labour	233,156	40.8	108	35	28.2
Progressive	55,586	9.7	82	6	4.8
Independent	5,922	1.0	4	0	0.0
