= City of London (London County Council constituency) =

London County Council constituency

- Former constituency for the London County Council

Former constituency
- Created: 1889
- Abolished: 1949
- Member: 4
- Replaced by: Cities of London and Westminster

City of London was a constituency used for elections to the London County Council between 1889 and 1949. The seat shared boundaries with the UK Parliament constituency of the same name. Uniquely, the seat elected four councillors.

== Councillors ==
Year	Name	Party	Name	Party	Name	Party	Name	Party
1889	Benjamin Cohen	Moderate	Henry Clarke	Moderate	John Lubbock	Progressive	Archibald Primrose	Progressive
1892	Benjamin Cohen	Moderate	Henry Clarke	Moderate	Alfred Fowell Buxton	Moderate	Henry Fitzalan-Howard	Moderate
1895	Benjamin Cohen	Moderate	Henry Clarke	Moderate	Joseph Dimsdale	Moderate	Henry Fitzalan-Howard	Moderate
1896	Benjamin Cohen	Moderate	Henry Clarke	Moderate	Joseph Dimsdale	Moderate	Rudolph Feilding	Moderate
1898	Benjamin Cohen	Moderate	Henry Clarke	Moderate	Joseph Dimsdale	Moderate	George Osborne	Moderate
1899	Benjamin Cohen	Moderate	Henry Clarke	Moderate	Joseph Dimsdale	Moderate	Alexander Thynne	Moderate
1901	Frederick Prat Alliston	Moderate	Henry Clarke	Moderate	Alfred Louis Cohen	Moderate	Stuart Sankey	Moderate
1904	Frederick Prat Alliston	Moderate	Thomas Brooke-Hitching	Moderate	Rupert Guinness	Moderate	Stuart Sankey	Moderate
1907	Nathaniel Louis Cohen	Municipal Reform	Francis Stanhope Hanson	Municipal Reform	William Henry Pannell	Municipal Reform	Stuart Sankey	Moderate
1910	Nathaniel Louis Cohen	Municipal Reform	James William Domoney	Municipal Reform	William Henry Pannell	Municipal Reform	Stuart Sankey	Moderate
1911	Gilbert Johnstone	Municipal Reform	James William Domoney	Municipal Reform	William Henry Pannell	Municipal Reform	Stuart Sankey	Moderate
1913	Gilbert Johnstone	Municipal Reform	James William Domoney	Municipal Reform	William Henry Pannell	Municipal Reform	William Wilson Grantham	Municipal Reform
1915	Gilbert Johnstone	Municipal Reform	James William Domoney	Municipal Reform	Charles Hanson	Municipal Reform	William Wilson Grantham	Municipal Reform
1917	John Robarts	Municipal Reform	James William Domoney	Municipal Reform	Charles Hanson	Municipal Reform	William Wilson Grantham	Municipal Reform
1918	John Robarts	Municipal Reform	Rowland Blades	Municipal Reform	Charles Hanson	Municipal Reform	William Wilson Grantham	Municipal Reform
1919	Lulham Pound	Municipal Reform	Rowland Blades	Municipal Reform	Percy Simmons	Municipal Reform	William Wilson Grantham	Municipal Reform
1919	Lulham Pound	Municipal Reform	Geoffrey Head	Municipal Reform	Percy Simmons	Municipal Reform	William Wilson Grantham	Municipal Reform
1928	Josiah Gunton	Municipal Reform	Geoffrey Head	Municipal Reform	Percy Simmons	Municipal Reform	William Wilson Grantham	Municipal Reform
1930	William Neal	Municipal Reform	Geoffrey Head	Municipal Reform	Percy Simmons	Municipal Reform	William Wilson Grantham	Municipal Reform
1931	Louis Arthur Newton	Municipal Reform	Geoffrey Head	Municipal Reform	Percy Simmons	Municipal Reform	William Wilson Grantham	Municipal Reform
1934	Frank Bowater	Municipal Reform	Angus Scott	Municipal Reform	Percy Simmons	Municipal Reform	William Wilson Grantham	Municipal Reform
1937	George Henry Wilkinson	Municipal Reform	Angus Scott	Municipal Reform	Percy Simmons	Municipal Reform	William Wilson Grantham	Municipal Reform
1940	George Henry Wilkinson	Municipal Reform	Angus Scott	Municipal Reform	Harold Webbe	Municipal Reform	William Wilson Grantham	Municipal Reform
1941	George Henry Wilkinson	Municipal Reform	Arthur Charles Bonsor	Municipal Reform	Harold Webbe	Municipal Reform	William Wilson Grantham	Municipal Reform
1942	George Henry Wilkinson	Municipal Reform	Arthur Charles Bonsor	Municipal Reform	Harold Webbe	Municipal Reform	Harold John Musker	Municipal Reform
1944	Harry Twyford	Municipal Reform	Arthur Charles Bonsor	Municipal Reform	Harold Webbe	Municipal Reform	Harold John Musker	Municipal Reform
1946	Seymour Howard	Municipal Reform	Arthur Charles Bonsor	Municipal Reform	Harold Webbe	Municipal Reform	Harold John Musker	Municipal Reform
1947	Seymour Howard	Municipal Reform	Arthur Charles Bonsor	Municipal Reform	Harold Webbe	Municipal Reform	Angus Mackinnon	Municipal Reform

== Election results ==
1889 London County Council election: City of London
Party	Candidate	Votes	%	±%
Progressive	John Lubbock	8,976		
Progressive	Archibald Primrose	8,032		
Moderate	Sir Benjamin Cohen	3,925		
Moderate	Henry Clarke	3,622		
Moderate	George Shaw	2,752		
Moderate	George Noah Johnson	729		
Progressive win (new seat)				
Progressive win (new seat)				
Moderate win (new seat)				
Moderate win (new seat)				

1892 London County Council election: City of London
Party	Candidate	Votes	%	±%
Moderate	Alfred Fowell Buxton	6,053		
Moderate	Henry Clarke	5,937		
Moderate	Sir Benjamin Cohen	5,923		
Moderate	Henry Fitzalan-Howard	5,760		
Progressive	John George Rhodes	2,399		
Progressive	George Palmer	373		
Moderate gain from Progressive		Swing		
Moderate gain from Progressive		Swing		
Moderate hold		Swing		
Moderate hold		Swing		

1895 London County Council election: City of London
Party	Candidate	Votes	%	±%
Moderate	Joseph Dimsdale	6,092		
Moderate	Sir Benjamin Cohen	6,035		
Moderate	Henry Clarke	5,922		
Moderate	Henry Fitzalan-Howard	5,901		
Progressive	A. Hoare	2,067		
Progressive	J. H. Moore	1,857		
Progressive	A. J. Shepheard	1,834		
Progressive	J. H. Sandars	1,815		
Moderate hold		Swing		
Moderate hold		Swing		
Moderate hold		Swing		
Moderate hold		Swing		

1898 London County Council election: City of London
Party	Candidate	Votes	%	±%
Moderate	Joseph Dimsdale	5,893		
Moderate	George Osborne	5,785		
Moderate	Alfred Louis Cohen	5,780		
Moderate	Henry Clarke	5,780		
Progressive	T. A. Brassey	2,413		
Progressive	Noel Buxton	2,396		
Moderate hold		Swing		
Moderate hold		Swing		
Moderate hold		Swing		
Moderate hold		Swing		

1901 London County Council election: City of London
Party	Candidate	Votes	%	±%
Conservative	Frederick Prat Alliston	3,325	18.8	−2.2
Conservative	Henry Clarke	3,290	18.6	−2.0
Conservative	Alfred Louis Cohen	3,251	18.4	−2.1
Conservative	Stuart Sankey	3,138	17.8	−2.8
Progressive	Reginald Welby	2,341	13.2	+4.6
Progressive	Evan Spicer	2,327	13.2	+4.7
Conservative hold		Swing	-3.5	
Conservative hold		Swing		
Conservative hold		Swing		
Conservative hold		Swing		

1904 London County Council election: City of London
Party	Candidate	Votes	%	±%
Conservative	Frederick Prat Alliston	4,907		
Conservative	Thomas Brooke-Hitching	4,858		
Conservative	Rupert Guinness	4,799		
Conservative	Stuart Sankey	4,606		
Progressive	F. W. Buxton	2,342		
Progressive	William Mansfield	2,298		
Conservative hold		Swing		
Conservative hold		Swing		
Conservative hold		Swing		
Conservative hold		Swing		

1907 London County Council election: City of London
Party	Candidate	Votes	%	±%
Municipal Reform	Francis Stanhope Hanson	7,603		
Municipal Reform	Nathaniel Louis Cohen	7,519		
Municipal Reform	William Henry Pannell	7,484		
Municipal Reform	Stuart Sankey	7,451		
Progressive	Charles Buxton	1,768		
Progressive	F. Debenham	1,766		
Progressive	G. S. Warmington	1,719		
Progressive	Willoughby Dickinson	1,646		
Majority				
Municipal Reform hold		Swing		
Municipal Reform hold		Swing		
Municipal Reform hold		Swing		
Municipal Reform hold		Swing		

1910 London County Council election: City of London
Party	Candidate	Votes	%	±%
Municipal Reform	Nathaniel Louis Cohen	5,413	21.0	
Municipal Reform	James William Domoney	5,404	20.9	
Municipal Reform	Stuart Sankey	5,383	20.9	
Municipal Reform	William Henry Pannell	5,370	20.8	
Progressive	Edmund Charles Rawlings	1,439	5.6	
Progressive	Harold Glanville	1,403	5.4	
Progressive	Samuel Lammas Dore	1,403	5.4	
Progressive	Frederick Link	1,393	5.4	
Majority				
Municipal Reform hold		Swing		
Municipal Reform hold		Swing		
Municipal Reform hold		Swing		
Municipal Reform hold		Swing		

1913 London County Council election: City of London
Party	Candidate	Votes	%	±%
Municipal Reform	James William Domoney	7,321	21.5	+0.6
Municipal Reform	Gilbert Johnstone	7,279	21.4	+0.4
Municipal Reform	William Henry Pannell	7,245	21.2	+0.4
Municipal Reform	Stuart Sankey	7,206	21.2	+0.3
Progressive	Fitzroy Hemphill	1,708	5.0	−0.6
Progressive	Constantine Scaramanga-Ralli	1,647	4.8	−0.8
Progressive	Stephen Miall	1,644	4.8	−0.6
Majority		5,498	16.2	+1.0
Municipal Reform hold		Swing		
Municipal Reform hold		Swing		
Municipal Reform hold		Swing		
Municipal Reform hold		Swing		

1919 London County Council election: City of London
Party	Candidate	Votes	%	±%
Municipal Reform	John Lulham Pound	Unopposed	n/a	n/a
Municipal Reform	William Wilson Grantham	Unopposed	n/a	n/a
Municipal Reform	Percy Simmons	Unopposed	n/a	n/a
Municipal Reform	Rowland Blades	Unopposed	n/a	n/a
Municipal Reform hold		Swing	n/a	
Municipal Reform hold		Swing	n/a	
Municipal Reform hold		Swing	n/a	
Municipal Reform hold		Swing	n/a	

City of London by-election, 1919
Party	Candidate	Votes	%	±%
Municipal Reform	Geoffrey Head	Unopposed	N/A	N/A
Municipal Reform hold		Swing	N/A	

1922 London County Council election: City of London
Party	Candidate	Votes	%	±%
Municipal Reform	William Wilson Grantham	Unopposed	n/a	n/a
Municipal Reform	Geoffrey Head	Unopposed	n/a	n/a
Municipal Reform	John Lulham Pound	Unopposed	n/a	n/a
Municipal Reform	Percy Simmons	Unopposed	n/a	n/a
Municipal Reform hold		Swing	n/a	
Municipal Reform hold		Swing	n/a	
Municipal Reform hold		Swing	n/a	
Municipal Reform hold		Swing	n/a	

1925 London County Council election: City of London
Party	Candidate	Votes	%	±%
Municipal Reform	William Wilson Grantham	Unopposed	n/a	n/a
Municipal Reform	Geoffrey Head	Unopposed	n/a	n/a
Municipal Reform	John Lulham Pound	Unopposed	n/a	n/a
Municipal Reform	Percy Simmons	Unopposed	n/a	n/a
Municipal Reform hold		Swing	n/a	
Municipal Reform hold		Swing	n/a	
Municipal Reform hold		Swing	n/a	
Municipal Reform hold		Swing	n/a	

1928 London County Council election: City of London
Party	Candidate	Votes	%	±%
Municipal Reform	William Wilson Grantham	6,506	n/a	n/a
Municipal Reform	Josiah Gunton	6,496	n/a	n/a
Municipal Reform	Geoffrey Head	6,469	n/a	n/a
Municipal Reform	Percy Simmons	6,328	n/a	n/a
Liberal	James Meston	1,326	n/a	n/a
Liberal	Frank A Notcutt	1,246	n/a	n/a
Liberal	T. Atholl Robertson	1,233	n/a	n/a
Liberal	George Frederic Rowe	1,104	n/a	n/a
Independent Labour	Henry Sparling Hadwyn	228	n/a	n/a
Municipal Reform hold		Swing	n/a	
Municipal Reform hold		Swing	n/a	
Municipal Reform hold		Swing	n/a	
Municipal Reform hold		Swing	n/a	

1931 London County Council election: City of London
Party	Candidate	Votes	%	±%
Municipal Reform	William Wilson Grantham	Unopposed	n/a	n/a
Municipal Reform	Geoffrey Head	Unopposed	n/a	n/a
Municipal Reform	Louis Arthur Newton	Unopposed	n/a	n/a
Municipal Reform	Percy Simmons	Unopposed	n/a	n/a
Municipal Reform hold		Swing	n/a	
Municipal Reform hold		Swing	n/a	
Municipal Reform hold		Swing	n/a	
Municipal Reform hold		Swing	n/a	

1934 London County Council election: City of London
Party	Candidate	Votes	%	±%
Municipal Reform	Frank Bowater	Unopposed	n/a	n/a
Municipal Reform	William Wilson Grantham	Unopposed	n/a	n/a
Municipal Reform	Angus Scott	Unopposed	n/a	n/a
Municipal Reform	Percy Simmons	Unopposed	n/a	n/a
Municipal Reform hold		Swing	n/a	
Municipal Reform hold		Swing	n/a	
Municipal Reform hold		Swing	n/a	
Municipal Reform hold		Swing	n/a	

1937 London County Council election: City of London
Party	Candidate	Votes	%	±%
Municipal Reform	William Wilson Grantham	Unopposed	n/a	n/a
Municipal Reform	Angus Scott	Unopposed	n/a	n/a
Municipal Reform	Percy Simmons	Unopposed	n/a	n/a
Municipal Reform	George Wilkinson	Unopposed	n/a	n/a
Municipal Reform hold		Swing	n/a	
Municipal Reform hold		Swing	n/a	
Municipal Reform hold		Swing	n/a	
Municipal Reform hold		Swing	n/a	

1946 London County Council election: City of London
Party	Candidate	Votes	%	±%
Conservative	Arthur Charles Bonsor	Unopposed	n/a	n/a
Conservative	Seymour Howard	Unopposed	n/a	n/a
Conservative	John Musker	Unopposed	n/a	n/a
Conservative	Harold Webbe	Unopposed	n/a	n/a
Conservative hold		Swing	n/a	
Conservative hold		Swing	n/a	
Conservative hold		Swing	n/a	
Conservative hold		Swing	n/a	
