= 1901 London County Council election =

- March 1901

118 Council Seats

	First party	Second party
Leader	McKinnon Wood	Edmund Boulnois
Party	Progressive	Conservative
Leader since	1898	1898
Leader's seat	Alderman	Marylebone East
Last election	86	56
Seats won	98	38
Seat change	+13	-18
Popular vote	149,997	114,384
Percentage	55.6%	42.4%
Councillors	98	55
Aldermen	17	2
Seats +/–	▲13	▼18

An election to the County Council of London took place in March 1901. The "Moderates" decided to contest the elections under the label of "Conservative and Unionist". Liberals and Socialists continued to contest the elections under the "Progressive" label.

== Election result ==
London Election Result 1901 Electorate: 710,163 Turnout: (37.7%) Total Valid: 269,711
Party	Seats	Gains	Losses	Net gain/loss	Seats %	Votes %	Votes	+/−
Progressive	84			▲13		55.6	149,997	▼7.5
Conservative	32			▼18		42.4	114,384	▲5.5
Other	2			▲2		2.0	5,330	▲2.0

== Constituency results ==
=== Battersea and Clapham ===
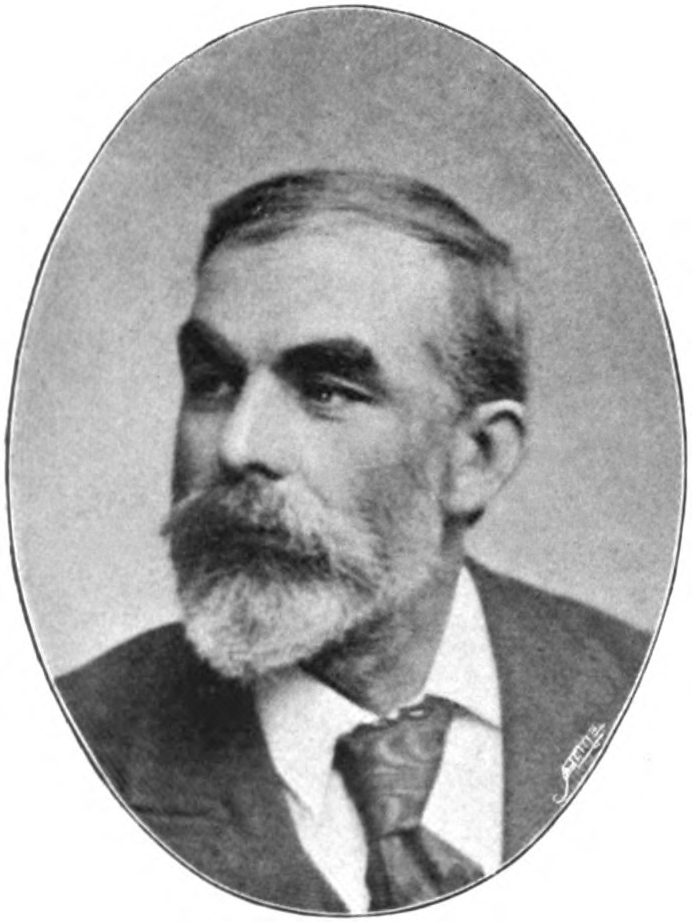
Burns

Battersea
Party	Candidate	Votes	%	±%
Progressive	William J Davies	5,951	38.6	
Progressive	John Burns	5,906	38.3	
Conservative	Stanley Boulter	1,829	11.9	
Conservative	John Dumphreys	1,746	11.3	
Progressive hold		Swing		
Progressive hold		Swing		

Rotton

Clapham
Party	Candidate	Votes	%	±%
Conservative	Arthur Rotton	4,141	34.2	
Conservative	Thomas Penn Gaskell	4,058	33.5	
Progressive	George Hewitt	3,903	32.3	
Conservative hold		Swing		
Conservative hold		Swing		

=== Bethnal Green ===
Smith

Bethnal Green North East
Party	Candidate	Votes	%	±%
Progressive	Edward A Smith	3,030	36.3	
Progressive	Edwin Cornwall	2,963	35.5	
Conservative	Charles Thomas Bruce	1,181	14.2	
Conservative	Cartaret Fitzgerald Collins	1,169	14.0	
Progressive hold		Swing		
Progressive hold		Swing		

Branch

Bethnal Green South West
Party	Candidate	Votes	%	±%
Progressive	James Branch	2,401	32.2	
Progressive	Thomas Wiles	2,365	31.7	
Conservative	Archibald Hay	1,358	18.2	
Conservative	Frederick Joseph Coltman	1,329	17.8	
Progressive hold		Swing		
Progressive hold		Swing		

=== Camberwell ===
Hardy

Dulwich
Party	Candidate	Votes	%	±%
Progressive	George Hardy	3,312	39.7	+14.7
Conservative	John Ratcliffe Cousins	2,587	31.0	−6.6
Conservative	James Alfred Thornhill	2,442	29.3	−8.1
Progressive gain from Conservative		Swing	+11.0	
Conservative hold		Swing		

Camberwell North
Party	Candidate	Votes	%	±%
Progressive	Richard Strong	unopposed	n/a	n/a
Progressive	Henry Robert Taylor	unopposed	n/a	n/a
Progressive hold		Swing	n/a	
Progressive hold		Swing	n/a	

Verney

Peckham
Party	Candidate	Votes	%	±%
Progressive	Frederick Verney	3,553	31.6	+5.9
Progressive	George Hardy	3,546	31.6	+2.7
Conservative	William Scott-Scott	2,138	19.0	−5.2
Conservative	John Rees	2,000	17.8	−3.4
Progressive hold		Swing		
Progressive hold		Swing	n/a	

=== Chelsea ===
Jeffery

Chelsea
Party	Candidate	Votes	%	±%
Progressive	James Jeffery	4,582	31.8	+4.3
Progressive	Emslie Horniman	4,481	31.1	+6.1
Conservative	Ernest Louis Meinertzhagen	2,682	18.6	−4.0
Conservative	William Elliott	2,659	18.5	−6.5
Progressive hold		Swing		
Progressive hold		Swing		

=== City of London ===
Alliston

City of London
Party	Candidate	Votes	%	±%
Conservative	Frederick Prat Alliston	3,325	18.8	−2.2
Conservative	Henry Clarke	3,290	18.6	−2.0
Conservative	Alfred Louis Cohen	3,251	18.4	−2.1
Conservative	Stuart Sankey	3,138	17.8	−2.8
Progressive	Reginald Welby	2,341	13.2	+4.6
Progressive	Evan Spicer	2,327	13.2	+4.7
Conservative hold		Swing	-3.5	
Conservative hold		Swing		
Conservative hold		Swing		
Conservative hold		Swing		

=== Deptford ===
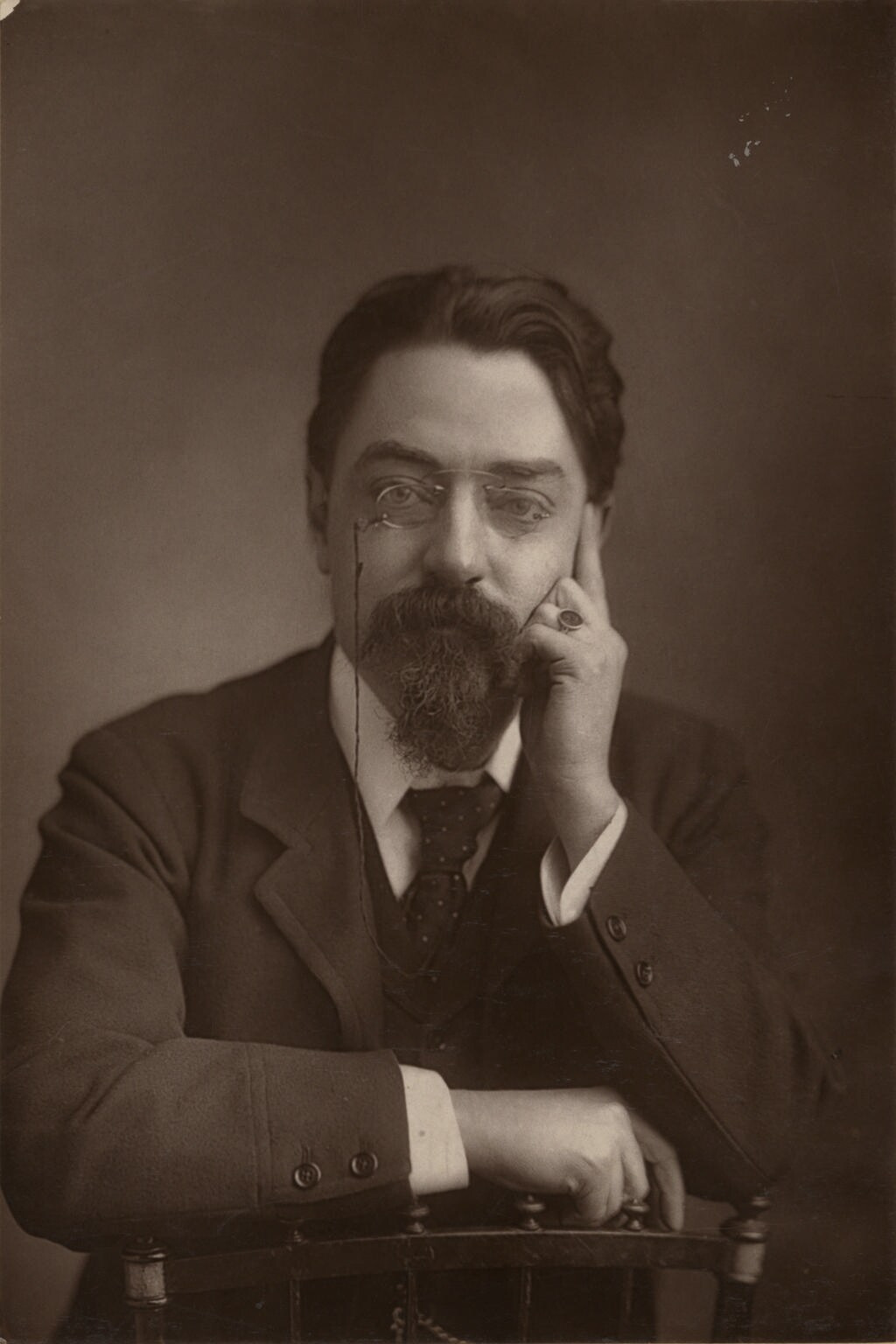
Webb

Deptford
Party	Candidate	Votes	%	±%
Progressive	Sidney Webb	5,496	33.3	+3.4
Progressive	Robert Charles Phillimore	5,349	32.4	+2.7
Conservative	Thomas William Marchant	2,865	17.4	−3.9
Conservative	Francis Herman Milford Wayne	2,781	16.9	−2.1
Progressive hold		Swing		
Progressive hold		Swing	+6.0	

=== Finsbury ===
Hemphill

Finsbury Central
Party	Candidate	Votes	%	±%
Progressive	Fitzroy Hemphill	2,023	26.8	+1.4
Progressive	Frank Smith	2,021	26.7	+4.5
Conservative	Phillip John Rutland	1,796	23.8	−3.0
Conservative	Sidney Low	1,722	22.8	−2.8
Progressive gain from Conservative		Swing		
Progressive gain from Conservative		Swing	+5.8	

Baker

Finsbury East
Party	Candidate	Votes	%	±%
Progressive	Allen Baker	2,471	37.3	+6.6
Progressive	Joseph Benson	2,409	36.4	+6.8
Conservative	William Porter	870	13.1	−7.1
Conservative	Herbert John Marcus	870	13.1	−6.3
Progressive hold		Swing	+6.7	
Progressive hold		Swing		

Swinton

Holborn
Party	Candidate	Votes	%	±%
Conservative	H. W. Bliss	2,146	37.4	−4.4
Conservative	George Swinton	2,135	37.2	−3.2
Progressive	Herman Cohen	1,464	25.5	+7.7
Conservative hold		Swing		
Conservative hold		Swing	-7.6	

=== Fulham ===
Davies

Fulham
Party	Candidate	Votes	%	±%
Progressive	Timothy Davies	5,341	29.3	+5.5
Progressive	Peter Lawson	5,259	28.9	+5.1
Conservative	Edward George Easton	3,497	19.2	−6.7
Conservative	Cameron Gull	3,483	19.1	−7.3
Independent	James Edwin Cooney	645	3.5	n/a
Progressive gain from Conservative		Swing		
Progressive gain from Conservative		Swing	+6.2	

=== Greenwich ===
Jackson

Greenwich
Party	Candidate	Votes	%	±%
Progressive	Richard Jackson	4,242	28.5	+1.1
Progressive	Frederick William Warmington	3,937	26.5	+3.7
Conservative	John Edward Shaw	3,209	21.6	−0.9
Conservative	William Kent Lemon	3,178	21.4	−1.0
Independent	James Ellis	315	2.1	n/a
Progressive hold		Swing		
Progressive hold		Swing	+1.7	

=== Hackney ===
Wood

Hackney Central
Party	Candidate	Votes	%	±%
Progressive	McKinnon Wood	3,355	33.5	+4.6
Progressive	Alfred James Shepheard	3,221	32.2	+3.7
Conservative	Stanley Johnson	1,742	17.4	−4.2
Conservative	George Cartwright	1,688	16.9	−4.0
Progressive hold		Swing		
Progressive hold		Swing	+4.1	

Lampard

Hackney North
Party	Candidate	Votes	%	±%
Progressive	George Lampard	4,458	30.7	
Progressive	John Sears	4,257	29.4	
Conservative	Elijah Baxter Forman	2,968	20.5	
Conservative	Joseph Richmond	2,819	19.4	
Progressive hold		Swing		
Progressive gain from Conservative		Swing		

Browne

Hackney South
Party	Candidate	Votes	%	±%
Progressive	Edmond Browne	4,231	33.6	+5.9
Progressive	Alfred Smith	4,169	33.1	+3.8
Conservative	Maurice Edmund Arnold Wallis	2,117	16.8	−4.9
Conservative	Frederick Briscoe Oldfield	2,068	16.4	−5.0
Progressive hold		Swing		
Progressive hold		Swing	+4.9	

=== Hammersmith ===
Rawlings

Hammersmith
Party	Candidate	Votes	%	±%
Conservative	Edward Collins	3,128	26.1	−2.4
Conservative	Jocelyn Brandon	3,110	25.9	−2.2
Progressive	William Turner Lord	2,885	24.0	+2.2
Progressive	Edmund Charles Rawlings	2,874	24.0	+2.4
Conservative hold		Swing		
Conservative hold		Swing	-2.3	

=== Hampstead ===
Fletcher

Hampstead
Party	Candidate	Votes	%	±%
Conservative	John Fletcher	2,476	37.7	+1.6
Progressive	William Edward Mullins	2,231	34.0	+5.1
Conservative	Edward Bond	1,864	28.4	−6.6
Conservative hold		Swing		
Progressive gain from Conservative		Swing		

=== Islington ===
Torrance

Islington East
Party	Candidate	Votes	%	±%
Progressive	Andrew Mitchell Torrance	3,992	32.6	+4.0
Progressive	James Laughland	3,751	30.6	+4.8
Conservative	George Frederick Lloyd Mortimer	2,254	18.4	−5.3
Conservative	William Beale	2,249	18.4	−3.5
Progressive hold		Swing		
Progressive hold		Swing	+4.4	

Napier

Islington North
Party	Candidate	Votes	%	±%
Progressive	Thomas Bateman Napier	4,097	32.6	+4.3
Progressive	William Coulson Parkinson	4,075	32.4	+6.4
Conservative	George Benson Clough	2,206	17.5	−5.7
Conservative	Sydney Gedge	2,197	17.5	−5.0
Progressive hold		Swing		
Progressive hold		Swing	+5.4	

Williams

Islington South
Party	Candidate	Votes	%	±%
Progressive	Howell Jones Williams	unopposed	n/a	n/a
Independent	George Elliott	unopposed	n/a	n/a
Progressive hold		Swing	n/a	
Independent hold		Swing	n/a	

Radford

Islington West
Party	Candidate	Votes	%	±%
Progressive	William Goodman	3,039	34.9	+2.6
Progressive	George Radford	3,014	34.6	+3.6
Conservative	Felix Arthur Davies	1,351	15.5	−3.3
Conservative	George Alexander Grant	1,296	14.9	−3.0
Progressive hold		Swing		
Progressive hold		Swing	+3.1	

=== Kensington ===
Pope

Kensington North
Party	Candidate	Votes	%	±%
Progressive	Walter Pope	2,315	26.1	+1.2
Progressive	Henry Lorenzo Jephson	2,233	25.1	+0.8
Conservative	William Alexander Thomson	2,179	24.5	−1.0
Conservative	Hugh Morrison	2,156	24.3	−0.9
Progressive gain from Conservative		Swing		
Progressive gain from Conservative		Swing	+1.0	

Robinson

Kensington South
Party	Candidate	Votes	%	±%
Conservative	Charles Hallyburton Campbell	2,264	37.6	−3.9
Conservative	Richard Robinson	2,253	37.4	3.8
Progressive	Edward Holton Coumbe	758	12.6	+3.9
Progressive	Rodney John Fennessy	754	12.5	+3.9
Conservative hold		Swing		
Conservative hold		Swing	-3.9	

=== Lambeth ===
Sharp

Brixton
Party	Candidate	Votes	%	±%
Progressive	Frederick Dolman	3,244	30.1	+5.7
Progressive	Lewen Sharp	3,226	29.9	+5.6
Conservative	William Bell	2,180	20.2	−1.1
Conservative	Charles Jerome	2,138	19.8	−10.1
Progressive gain from Conservative		Swing		
Progressive gain from Conservative		Swing	+5.6	

Benn

Kennington
Party	Candidate	Votes	%	±%
Progressive	John Benn	3,505	32.8	+7.0
Progressive	Stephen Collins	3,412	32.0	+6.1
Conservative	Benjamin William Bennett	1,913	17.9	−6.0
Conservative	Joseph Dixon	1,844	17.3	−7.2
Progressive hold		Swing		
Progressive hold		Swing	+6.6	

Lambeth North
Party	Candidate	Votes	%	±%
Progressive	Robert Williams	1,677	27.4	−4.9
Progressive	William Wightman	1,761	28.8	+1.6
Conservative	Jabez Williams	1,357	22.2	+3.5
Conservative	Charles Ansell	1,329	21.7	−0.1
Progressive hold		Swing		
Progressive hold		Swing	-3.3	

Hubbard

Norwood
Party	Candidate	Votes	%	±%
Progressive	Nathaniel William Hubbard	3,770	29.5	+6.9
Progressive	George Shrubsall	3,626	28.4	+5.8
Conservative	Alfred Rice-Oxley	2,709	21.2	−6.2
Conservative	John Cutler	2,669	20.9	−6.4
Progressive gain from Conservative		Swing		
Progressive gain from Conservative		Swing	+6.3	

=== Lewisham ===
Cleland

Lewisham
Party	Candidate	Votes	%	±%
Progressive	James William Cleland	4,370	40.8	+13.5
Conservative	George Edward Dodson	3,235	30.2	−6.3
Conservative	Theophilus William Williams	3,096	28.9	−7.3
Conservative hold		Swing		
Progressive gain from Conservative		Swing	+10.2	

=== Marylebone ===
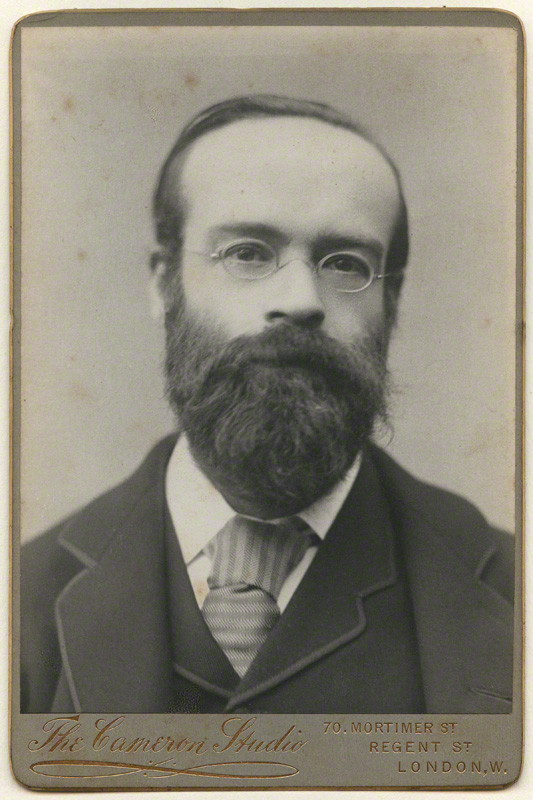
Leaf

Marylebone East
Party	Candidate	Votes	%	±%
Independent	Walter Leaf	1,959	25.7	+6.0
Independent	John Fletcher Little	1,897	24.9	+3.9
Conservative	John Samuel Underhill	1,896	24.9	−5.4
Conservative	Thomas Brooke-Hitching	1,866	24.5	−4.5
Independent gain from Conservative		Swing		
Independent gain from Conservative		Swing	+5.0	

White

Marylebone West
Party	Candidate	Votes	%	±%
Conservative	Horace Farquhar	2,290	26.9	−3.5
Conservative	Edward White	2,198	25.8	−3.2
Progressive	Warren Hastings Sands	2,054	24.2	+3.9
Progressive	Walter Gorst Clay	1,961	23.1	+2.9
Conservative hold		Swing		
Conservative hold		Swing	-3.3	

=== Newington ===
Walworth
Party	Candidate	Votes	%	±%
Progressive	Russell Spokes	2,607	33.8	+2.5
Progressive	Richard Parker	2,566	33.3	+2.0
Conservative	Selwyn Joseph Willis	1,251	16.2	−2.5
Conservative	Richard Edgcumbe	1,239	16.2	−1.9
Progressive hold		Swing		
Progressive hold		Swing	+2.2	

Piggott

Newington West
Party	Candidate	Votes	%	±%
Progressive	John Piggott	3,020	39.6	+7.1
Progressive	James Daniel Gilbert	3,009	39.4	+6.4
Conservative	William Lansdale	822	10.8	−6.5
Conservative	Thomas Hoare	779	10.2	−6.9
Progressive hold		Swing		
Progressive hold		Swing	+6.7	

=== Paddington ===
Blackwood

Paddington North
Party	Candidate	Votes	%	±%
Conservative	Richard Beachcroft	1,962	26.0	−1.2
Progressive	John Blackwood	1,916	25.4	+2.0
Conservative	Henry Harris	1,858	24.6	−1.9
Progressive	Walter Richard Warren	1,820	24.1	+1.1
Conservative hold		Swing		
Progressive gain from Conservative		Swing	+1.5	

Paddington South
Party	Candidate	Votes	%	±%
Conservative	George Harris	1,618	43.1	−1.1
Conservative	Henry Harben	1,611	42.9	−0.4
Progressive	Charles George Paddon	524	14.0	+1.5
Conservative hold		Swing		
Conservative hold		Swing	-1.5	

=== St George's Hanover Square ===
Dickson-Poynder

St George's Hanover Square
Party	Candidate	Votes	%	±%
Conservative	John Dickson-Poynder	2,395	36.6	−6.4
Conservative	Hubert Greenwood	2,365	36.2	−6.2
Progressive	Edwyn Scudamore-Stanhope	1,414	21.6	+7.3
Independent	PH Saunders	361	5.5	n/a
Conservative hold		Swing		
Conservative hold		Swing	-6.8	

=== St Pancras ===
St Pancras East
Party	Candidate	Votes	%	±%
Progressive	Nathan Robinson	2,858	33.1	+0.2
Progressive	Thomas Arthur Organ	2,739	31.8	+1.2
Conservative	Edward William Sinclair-Cox	1,525	17.7	−1.2
Conservative	John Arthur Angus	1,499	17.4	−0.2
Progressive hold		Swing		
Progressive hold		Swing	+0.7	

Waterlow

St Pancras North
Party	Candidate	Votes	%	±%
Progressive	David Waterlow	2,791	29.7	+3.9
Progressive	Herbert Wilberforce	2,605	27.8	−0.7
Conservative	William James Wetenhall	2,051	21.9	−2.5
Conservative	Robert James Willis	1,855	19.8	−0.2
Independent	John Leighton	80	0.8	−1.0
Progressive hold		Swing		
Progressive hold		Swing	+2.1	

St Pancras South
Party	Candidate	Votes	%	±%
Progressive	Frank Sheffield	1,750	26.1	
Progressive	Henry Somerset	1,709	25.5	
Conservative	William Gastrell	1,624	24.3	
Conservative	Charles Fitzroy Doll	1,612	24.1	
Progressive hold		Swing		
Progressive gain from Conservative		Swing		

Collins

St Pancras West
Party	Candidate	Votes	%	±%
Progressive	William Collins	2,674	29.9	+2.3
Progressive	Charles Wynn-Carrington	2,544	28.4	+2.2
Conservative	Hugo Charteris	1,869	20.9	−2.1
Conservative	Thomas Bentley Westacott	1,860	20.8	−2.4
Progressive hold		Swing		
Progressive hold		Swing	+2.2	

=== Shoreditch ===
Stuart

Haggerston
Party	Candidate	Votes	%	±%
Progressive	James Stuart	2,300	35.3	0.0
Progressive	Robert Collier	2,251	34.5	−1.0
Conservative	William Bridgeman	1,001	15.3	+0.5
Conservative	Charles Walker	968	14.8	+0.4
Progressive hold		Swing		
Progressive hold		Swing	-0.5	

Ward

Hoxton
Party	Candidate	Votes	%	±%
Progressive	Edward Austin	2,379	28.2	−0.8
Progressive	Henry Ward	2,365	28.0	−1.3
Conservative	John D Davies	1,878	22.2	+1.2
Conservative	Henry Bird	1,827	21.6	+0.9
Progressive hold		Swing		
Progressive hold		Swing	-1.0	

=== Southwark ===
Cooper

Bermondsey
Party	Candidate	Votes	%	±%
Progressive	George Cooper	3,147	30.4	+0.2
Progressive	Arthur Acland Allen	3,096	29.9	+1.0
Conservative	Thomas Cox	2,094	20.2	−0.4
Conservative	A Layman	2,026	19.5	−0.8
Progressive hold		Swing		
Progressive hold		Swing	+0.6	

Glanville

Rotherhithe
Party	Candidate	Votes	%	±%
Progressive	Harold Glanville	2,934	28.2	+2.2
Progressive	Ambrose Pomeroy	2,927	28.1	+0.9
Conservative	James Augustus Grant	2,302	22.1	−1.7
Conservative	Arthur Pennell	2,244	21.6	−1.4
Progressive hold		Swing		
Progressive hold		Swing	+1.5	

Southwark West
Party	Candidate	Votes	%	±%
Progressive	Edric Bayley	unopposed	n/a	n/a
Progressive	Thomas Hunter	unopposed	n/a	n/a
Progressive hold		Swing		
Progressive hold		Swing	n/a	

=== Strand ===
Probyn

Strand
Party	Candidate	Votes	%	±%
Conservative	Clifford Probyn	2,506	31.3	
Conservative	Walter Emden	2,452	30.6	
Social Reform	Arthur Kinnaird	1,571	19.6	n/a
Social Reform	William Grey	1,484	18.5	n/a
Conservative hold		Swing		
Conservative hold		Swing		

=== Tower Hamlets ===
Cooper

Bow and Bromley
Party	Candidate	Votes	%	±%
Progressive	Ben Cooper	unopposed	n/a	n/a
Progressive	William Wallace Bruce	unopposed	n/a	n/a
Progressive hold		Swing	n/a	
Progressive hold		Swing	n/a	

Bawn

Limehouse
Party	Candidate	Votes	%	±%
Progressive	Arthur Lewis Leon	1,751	29.1	+1.5
Progressive	William Byron Bawn	1,637	27.2	−2.9
Conservative	Samuel Hugh Franklyn Hole	1,326	22.1	−0.1
Conservative	Dalby Williams	1,297	21.6	+1.6
Progressive hold		Swing		
Progressive hold		Swing	-1.4	

Straus

Mile End
Party	Candidate	Votes	%	±%
Progressive	Bertram Straus	1,941	29.9	+3.9
Progressive	John Renwick Seager	1,906	29.4	+2.7
Conservative	Ernest Flower	1,341	20.6	−3.4
Conservative	George Henry Booth	1,306	20.1	−3.2
Progressive hold		Swing		
Progressive hold		Swing	+3.3	

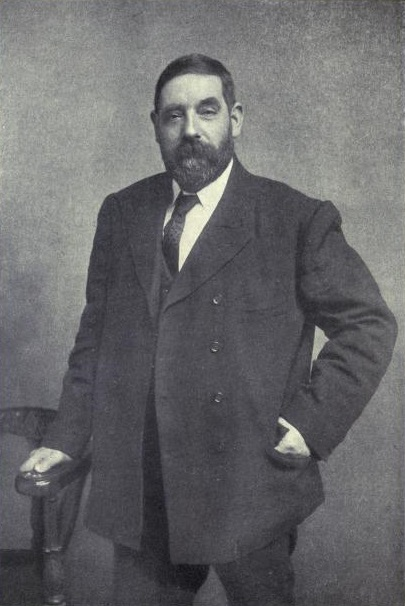
Crooks

Poplar
Party	Candidate	Votes	%	±%
Progressive	Will Crooks	unopposed	n/a	n/a
Progressive	John McDougall	unopposed	n/a	n/a
Progressive hold		Swing	n/a	
Progressive hold		Swing	n/a	

St George's in the East
Party	Candidate	Votes	%	±%
Progressive	John Smith	1,123	26.0	−1.8
Conservative	George Foster	1,117	25.9	+3.2
Conservative	Francis Anderton	1,047	24.3	+1.7
Progressive	John Ernest Matthews	1,024	23.7	−3.1
Progressive hold		Swing		
Conservative gain from Progressive		Swing	+2.4	

Steadman

Stepney
Party	Candidate	Votes	%	±%
Progressive	W. C. Steadman	1,943	26.4	−1.6
Conservative	Alfred Thomas Williams	1,842	25.1	+1.5
Progressive	Walter Baldwyn Yates	1,792	24.4	−2.1
Conservative	Edward Emanuel Micholls	1,774	24.1	+2.2
Progressive hold		Swing		
Conservative gain from Progressive		Swing	+1.8	

Levy-Lawson

Whitechapel
Party	Candidate	Votes	%	±%
Progressive	Harry Levy-Lawson	1,785	32.9	+2.6
Progressive	William Cowlishaw Johnson	1,701	31.3	+3.4
Conservative	Donald Alexander Munro	1,053	19.4	−1.2
Conservative	Henry Wren Henderson	892	16.4	4.5
Progressive hold		Swing		
Progressive hold		Swing		

=== Wandsworth ===
Wandsworth
Party	Candidate	Votes	%	±%
Progressive	Mark James Mayhew	6,470	37.6	+9.7
Conservative	George Longstaff	5,606	32.6	−6.2
Conservative	William Hunt	5,138	29.8	−3.6
Conservative hold		Swing		
Progressive gain from Conservative		Swing	+4.7	

=== Westminster ===
Westminster
Party	Candidate	Votes	%	±%
Conservative	Louis Henry Hayter	1,509	35.3	−7.3
Conservative	Reginald White Granville-Smith	1,485	34.7	−7.5
Progressive	Charles Langstein Heywood	883	20.7	+5.5
Temperance	John George Chappell	399	9.3	n/a
Conservative hold		Swing		
Conservative hold		Swing	-6.5	

=== Woolwich ===
Peel

Woolwich
Party	Candidate	Votes	%	±%
Conservative	William James Squires	3,807	28.4	+0.2
Conservative	William Peel	3,669	27.4	+1.8
Progressive	Decimus Marsh	3,137	23.4	−1.0
Progressive	H. B. D. Woodcock	2,784	20.8	−1.4
Conservative hold		Swing		
Conservative hold		Swing	+1.1	
