= 1910 London County Council election =

- 5 March 1910

118 Council Seats 60 seats needed for a majority

	First party	Second party	Third party
Leader	William Fisher	Sir John Benn	None
Party	Municipal Reform	Progressive	Labour
Leader since	1910	1907	—
Leader's seat	Alderman	Kennington	—
Last election	79 seats	37 seats	1 seat
Seats won	60	55	3
Seat change	▼19	▲18	▲2
Popular vote	217,537	174,872	24,736
Percentage	52.1%	41.9%	5.9%

An election to the County Council of London took place on 5 March 1910. It was the eighth triennial election of the whole Council. The size of the council was 118 councillors and 19 aldermen. The councillors were elected for electoral divisions corresponding to the parliamentary constituencies that had been created by the Representation of the People Act 1884. There were 57 dual member constituencies and one four member constituency. The council was elected by First Past the Post with each elector having two votes in the dual member seats.

== National government background ==
The Prime Minister of the day was the Liberal H. H. Asquith who led a minority Liberal Government that relied upon the Irish Parliamentary Party for a majority. A General Election had taken place a couple of months earlier in January at which the Liberals had lost their overall majority. The Conservatives and Liberal Unionists formed the official opposition. The Labour Party was the fourth party and generally voted with the Liberals in parliament.

== London Council background ==
The Municipal Reform party had been in power since winning a majority in 1907. It was now seeking its second mandate.

== Candidates ==
All constituencies were contested. The governing Municipal Reform Party ran a full slate of 118 candidates. The opposition Progressive Party ran 110 candidates. They ran candidates everywhere except the City of London where they ran three candidates, Hampstead, St George's Hanover Square and Strand where only one candidate stood, three constituencies where one candidate ran in tandem with Labour and Woolwich where they did not oppose a Labour pair. Four Independents also ran.

=== Labour Party ===
The party fielded ten candidates, five of these candidates ran in tandem with Progressive candidates, a further two candidates were not opposed by Progressives. The other three all stood in opposition to Progressive candidates. The Labour Party in London had no elected or otherwise recognised Leader.

== Outcome ==
The Municipal Reform Party was returned with its second successive majority. At the 1907 elections, they had an overall majority of 40. After that election they shared out the 9 vacant Aldermanic seats giving them an effective working majority of 43. At the 1910 elections, their overall majority was cut to just 2. After the election they decided to bolster their majority by giving themselves all 10 of the vacant Aldermanic seats. This gave them an effective working majority of 17. Two of their new Aldermanic appointments were people who had just been voted out by the electors.

== Constituency results ==
- Incumbent Councillors shown in bold.

=== Battersea and Clapham ===
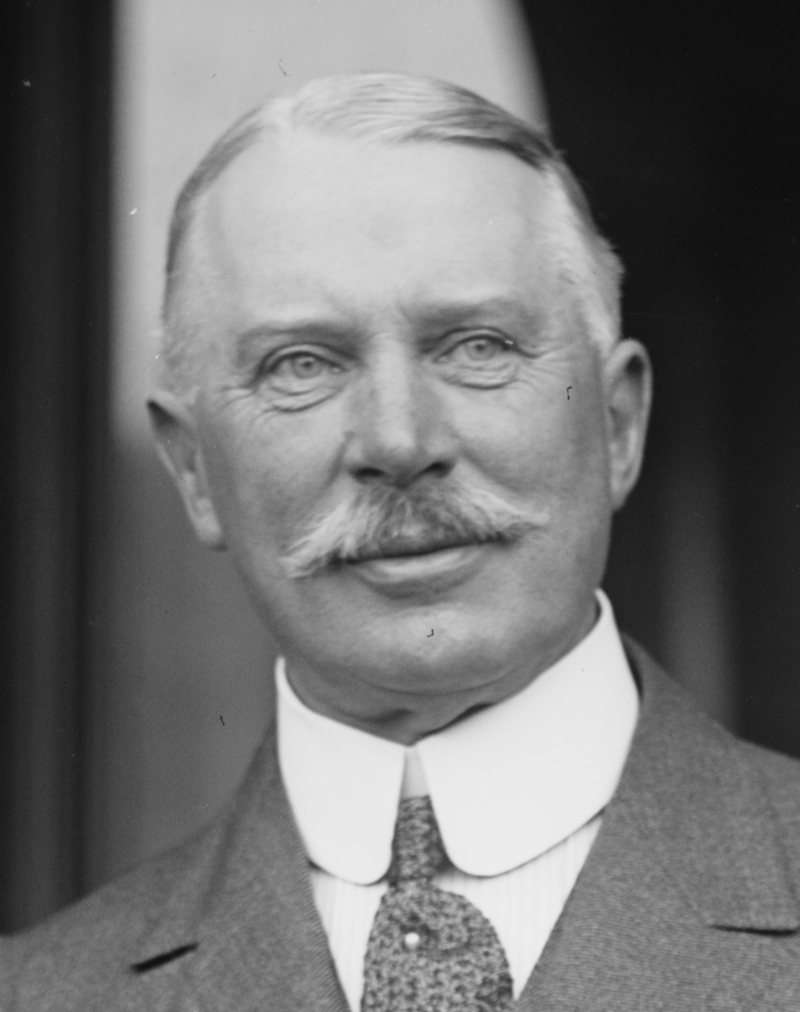
Benn

Battersea
Party	Candidate	Votes	%	±%
Progressive	**William J Davies**	7,254	26.3	
Progressive	Walter Richard Warren	7,049	25.6	
Municipal Reform	**Arthur Shirley Benn**	6,837	24.8	
Municipal Reform	Edwin Evans	6,441	23.4	
Majority		212	0.8	
Progressive **hold**		Swing		
Progressive **gain** from Municipal Reform		Swing		

Montefiore

Clapham
Party	Candidate	Votes	%	±%
Municipal Reform	Alexander Murray	9,184	30.6	
Municipal Reform	Robert Montefiore Sebag-Montefiore	9,087	30.3	
Progressive	F Griffiths	5,864	19.5	
Progressive	William Watts	5,861	19.5	
Majority		3,223	10.8	
Municipal Reform **hold**		Swing		

=== Bethnal Green ===
Smith

Bethnal Green North East
Party	Candidate	Votes	%	±%
Progressive	Garnham Edmonds	3,423	36.6	
Progressive	**Edward A Smith**	3,369	36.1	
Municipal Reform	Alexander Edwards	1,327	14.2	
Municipal Reform	William Long Restall	1,221	13.1	
Majority		2,042	21.9	
Progressive **hold**		Swing		

Headlam

Bethnal Green South West
Party	Candidate	Votes	%	±%
Progressive	**Stewart Headlam**	2,684	29.0	
Progressive	**Percy Harris**	2,618	28.2	
Municipal Reform	Eric Alfred Hoffgaard	2,060	22.2	
Municipal Reform	Horace Alfred Medway	1,900	20.5	
Majority		558	6.0	
Progressive **hold**		Swing		

=== Camberwell ===
Hall

Dulwich
Party	Candidate	Votes	%	±%
Municipal Reform	Frederick Hall	5,836	30.1	
Municipal Reform	Arthur Griffith-Boscawen	5,786	29.9	
Progressive	Arthur John Waldron	3,872	20.0	
Progressive	J. E. Boon	3,871	20.0	
Majority		1,914	9.9	
Municipal Reform **hold**		Swing		

Taylor

Camberwell North
Party	Candidate	Votes	%	±%
Progressive	**Reginald Bray**	4,355	31.1	
Progressive	**Henry Robert Taylor**	4,339	30.9	
Municipal Reform	W. Courtney	2,694	19.2	
Municipal Reform	P. Michael	2,633	18.8	
Majority		1,645	11.7	
Progressive **hold**		Swing		

Dowton

Peckham
Party	Candidate	Votes	%	±%
Progressive	**Thomas Gautrey**	4,381	28.0	
Progressive	George Gordon	4,097	26.2	
Municipal Reform	**William Leonard Dowton**	3,653	23.3	
Municipal Reform	P Conway	3,508	22.4	
Majority		444	2.9	
Progressive **hold**		Swing		
Progressive **gain** from Municipal Reform		Swing		

=== Chelsea ===
Norman

Chelsea
Party	Candidate	Votes	%	±%
Municipal Reform	**Ronald Collet Norman**	4,935	32.1	
Municipal Reform	Ernest Louis Meinertzhagen	4,886	31.7	
Progressive	Leonard Costello	2,809	18.2	
Progressive	John Mackenzie	2,766	18.0	
Majority		2,077	13.5	
Municipal Reform **hold**		Swing		

=== City of London ===
Rawlings

City of London
Party	Candidate	Votes	%	±%
Municipal Reform	**Nathaniel Louis Cohen**	5,413	21.0	
Municipal Reform	James William Domoney	5,404	20.9	
Municipal Reform	**Herbert Stuart Sankey**	5,383	20.9	
Municipal Reform	**William Henry Pannell**	5,370	20.8	
Progressive	Edmund Charles Rawlings	1,439	5.6	
Progressive	**Harold Glanville**	1,403	5.4	
Progressive	Samuel Lammas Dore	1,403	5.4	
Progressive	Frederick Link	1,393	5.4	
Majority				
Municipal Reform **hold**		Swing		

=== Deptford ===
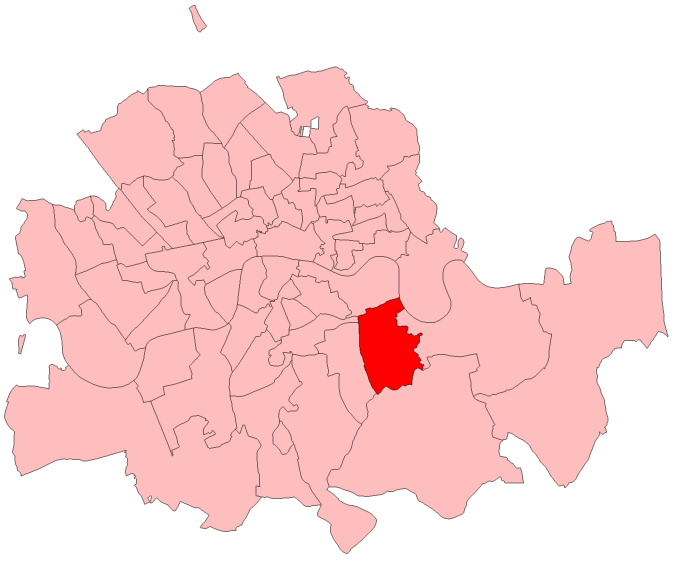
Deptford

Deptford
Party	Candidate	Votes	%	±%
Municipal Reform	William Freeman Barrett	5,932	28.6	
Municipal Reform	Edwin Mumford Preston	5,047	24.3	
Progressive	William James Pethybridge	4,910	23.6	
Labour	Campion Watson	4,880	23.5	
Majority				
Municipal Reform **gain** from Progressive		Swing		
Municipal Reform **gain** from Progressive		Swing		

=== Finsbury ===
Hemphill

Finsbury Central
Party	Candidate	Votes	%	±%
Progressive	**Arthur Barnett Russell**	2,482	25.3	
Municipal Reform	Lawrence William Simpson Rostron	2,460	25.1	
Progressive	**Fitzroy Hemphill**	2,459	25.0	
Municipal Reform	Samuel Joyce Thomas	2,420	24.6	
Majority				
Progressive **hold**		Swing		
Municipal Reform **gain** from Progressive		Swing		

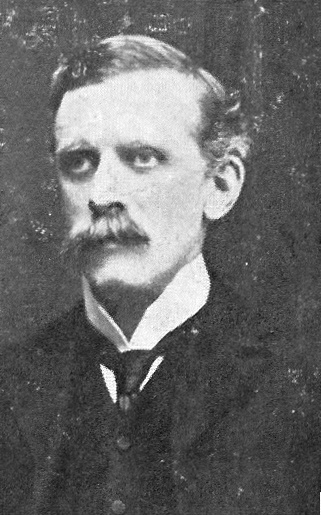
Cotton

Finsbury East
Party	Candidate	Votes	%	±%
Progressive	Evan Cotton	2,026	27.9	
Progressive	George Gillett	2,020	27.8	
Municipal Reform	Lord Hardwicke	1,616	22.3	
Municipal Reform	Joseph Lewthwaite	1,592	21.9	
Majority				
Progressive **gain** from Municipal Reform		Swing		
Progressive **gain** from Municipal Reform		Swing		

Lygon

Holborn
Party	Candidate	Votes	%	±%
Municipal Reform	**Henry Lygon**	3,324	35.0	
Municipal Reform	Robert Tasker	3,309	34.8	
Progressive	T. E. Morris	1,444	15.2	
Progressive	David Endacott	1,424	15.0	
Majority				
Municipal Reform **hold**		Swing		

=== Fulham ===
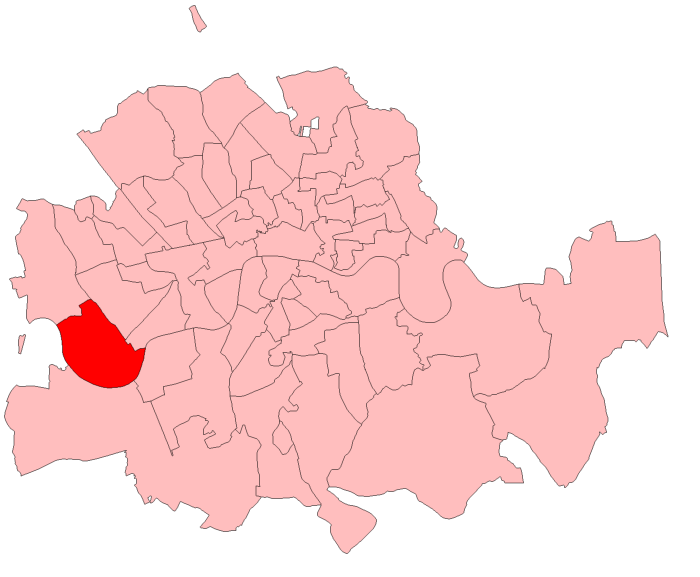
Fulham

Fulham
Party	Candidate	Votes	%	±%
Municipal Reform	**Cyril Cobb**	7,398	30.1	
Municipal Reform	**Edward George Easton**	7,314	29.8	
Progressive	W R Sayer	4,989	20.3	
Progressive	George Arthur Gale	4,856	19.8	
Majority				
Municipal Reform **hold**		Swing		

=== Greenwich ===
Hume

Greenwich
Party	Candidate	Votes	%	±%
Municipal Reform	Rowland Clegg-Hill	4,574	28.6	
Municipal Reform	George Hume	4,569	28.6	
Progressive	Thomas Ford	2,919	17.3	
Progressive	John Belcher Allpass	2,768	17.3	
Labour	Ernest Gilbert	1,161	7.3	
Majority				
Municipal Reform **hold**		Swing		

=== Hackney ===
Shepheard

Hackney Central
Party	Candidate	Votes	%	±%
Progressive	Alfred James Shepheard	3,634	27.5	
Progressive	Henrietta Adler	3,521	26.2	
Municipal Reform	G J Dowse	3,157	23.5	
Municipal Reform	John Foster Vesey-FitzGerald	3,053	22.8	
Majority		364	2.7	
Progressive **gain** from Municipal Reform		Swing		
Progressive **gain** from Municipal Reform		Swing		

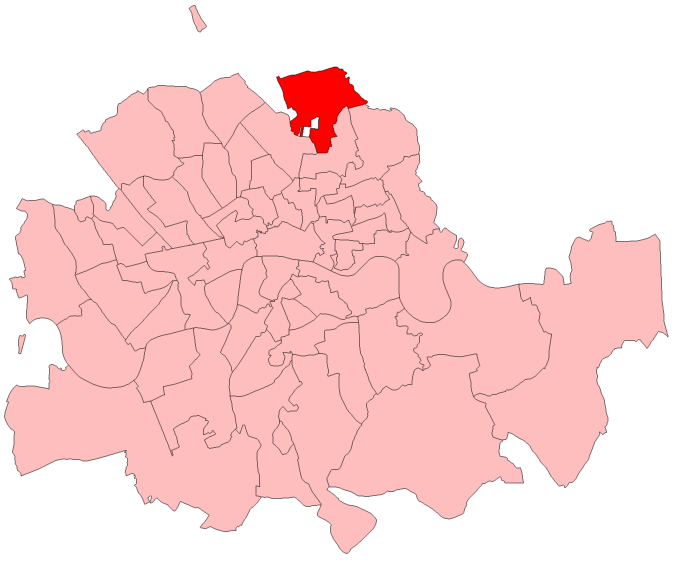
Hackney North

Hackney North
Party	Candidate	Votes	%	±%
Municipal Reform	George Jones	5,133	28.4	
Municipal Reform	Oscar Emanuel Warburg	5,042	27.9	
Progressive	Edward Calcott Pryce	3,970	21.9	
Progressive	John Bussey	3,953	21.8	
Majority		1,072	5.9	
Municipal Reform **hold**		Swing		

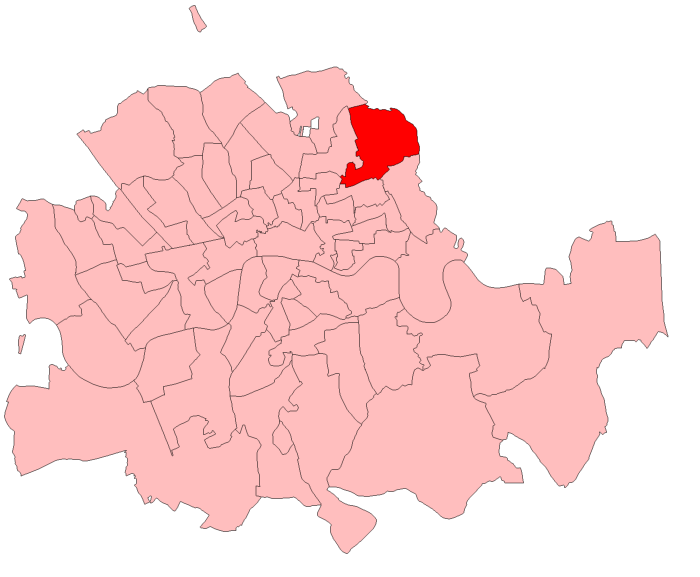
Hackney South

Hackney South
Party	Candidate	Votes	%	±%
Progressive	**Theodore Chapman**	4,947	32.0	
Progressive	**William Augustus Casson**	4,867	31.5	
Municipal Reform	William Deedes	2,830	18.3	
Municipal Reform	Master of Saltoun	2,809	18.2	
Majority				
Progressive **hold**		Swing		

=== Hammersmith ===
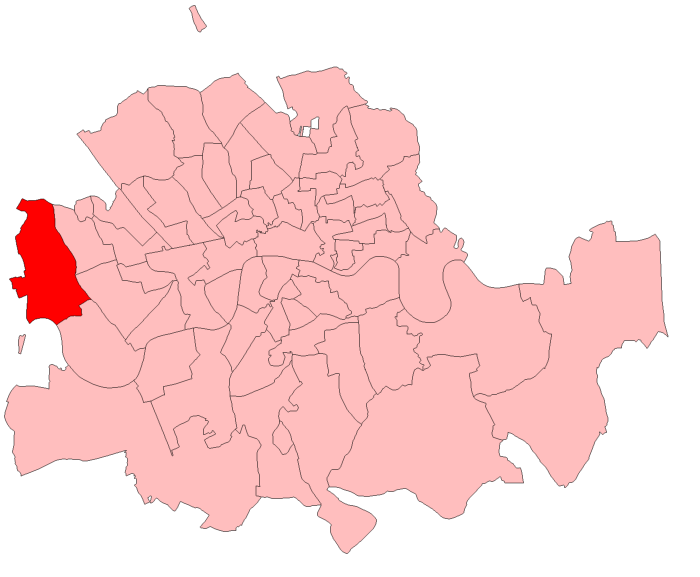
Hammersmith

Hammersmith
Party	Candidate	Votes	%	±%
Municipal Reform	**Jocelyn Brandon**	5,815	33.5	
Municipal Reform	Isidore Salmon	5,654	32.6	
Progressive	Ben Cooper	2,960	17.0	
Progressive	D R Thomas	2,936	16.9	
Majority				
Municipal Reform **hold**		Swing		

=== Hampstead ===
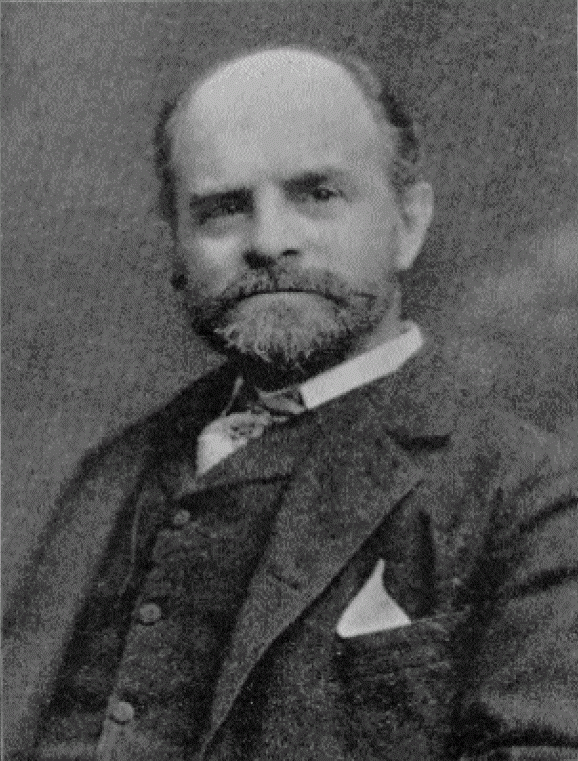
Taylor

Hampstead
Party	Candidate	Votes	%	±%
Municipal Reform	**Andrew Taylor**	4,527	39.5	
Municipal Reform	**Walter Reynolds**	4,509	39.3	
Progressive	Alexander Jones David	2,431	21.2	
Majority				
Municipal Reform **hold**		Swing		

=== Islington ===
Smallwood

Islington East
Party	Candidate	Votes	%	±%
Progressive	Edward Smallwood	4,031	26.2	
Progressive	Arthur Augustus Thomas	3,949	25.7	
Municipal Reform	Charles Crole-Rees	3,715	24.2	
Municipal Reform	Percy Simner	3,685	24.0	
Majority				
Progressive **gain** from Municipal Reform		Swing		
Progressive **gain** from Municipal Reform		Swing		

Hill

Islington North
Party	Candidate	Votes	%	±%
Municipal Reform	John Cathles Hill	4,613	27.1	
Municipal Reform	**Frederick Lionel Dove**	4,591	27.0	
Progressive	William Edward Mullins	3,918	23.0	
Progressive	Gordon Hall Caine	3,884	22.8	
Majority				
Municipal Reform **hold**		Swing		

Williams

Islington South
Party	Candidate	Votes	%	±%
Progressive	**Howell Jones Williams**	2,855	26.7	
Progressive	**George Dew**	2,841	26.6	
Municipal Reform	S Lambert	2,515	23.5	
Municipal Reform	Violet Douglas-Pennant	2,475	23.2	
Majority				
Progressive **hold**		Swing		

Lambert

Islington West
Party	Candidate	Votes	%	±%
Progressive	Richard Cornthwaite Lambert	3,193	27.9	
Progressive	**Henry Lorenzo Jephson**	3,172	27.7	
Municipal Reform	**H J Clarke**	2,542	22.2	
Municipal Reform	F Russell Davies	2,524	22.1	
Majority				
Progressive **gain** from Municipal Reform		Swing		
Progressive **gain** from Municipal Reform		Swing		

=== Kensington ===
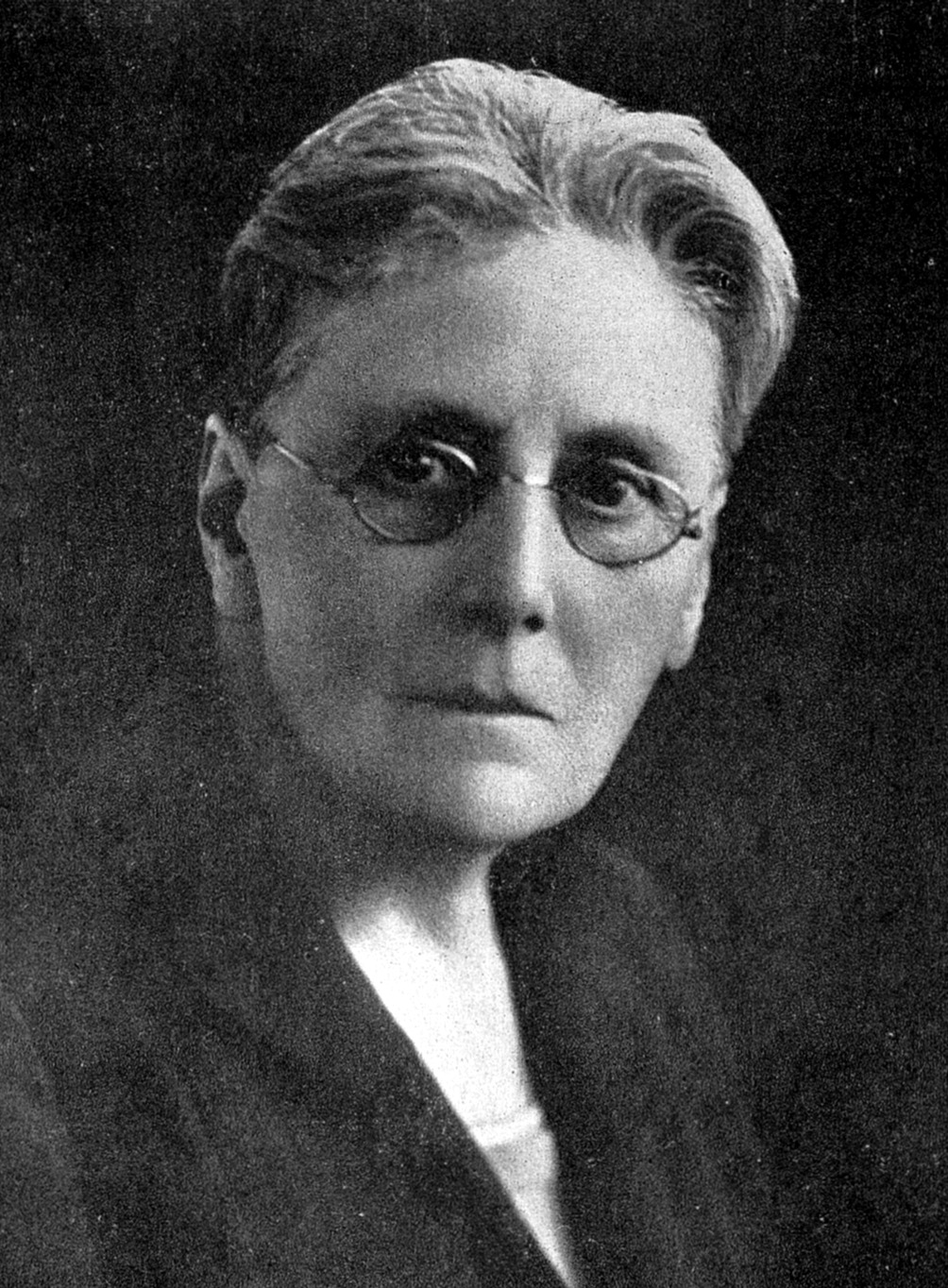
Bentham

Kensington North
Party	Candidate	Votes	%	±%
Municipal Reform	**David Davis**	3,761		
Municipal Reform	**Charles Lancelot Andrewes Skinner**	3,714		
Progressive	Frank Murray Carson	2,990		
Labour	Ethel Bentham	2,724		
Majority				
Municipal Reform **hold**		Swing		

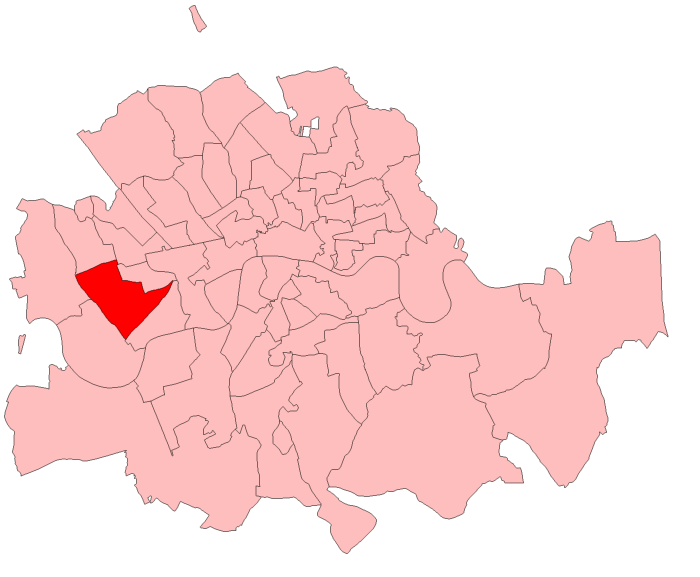
Kensington South

Kensington South
Party	Candidate	Votes	%	±%
Municipal Reform	**William Frederick Cavaye**	4,752		
Municipal Reform	William Whitaker Thompson	4,701		
Progressive	J E Allen	566		
Progressive	John Llewellyn Williams	543		
Majority				
Municipal Reform **hold**		Swing		

=== Lambeth ===
Gray

Brixton
Party	Candidate	Votes	%	±%
Municipal Reform	**William Haydon**	4,324		
Municipal Reform	Ernest Gray	4,295		
Progressive	M B Lange	3,188		
Progressive	George Shrubsall	3,186		
Majority				
Municipal Reform **hold**		Swing		

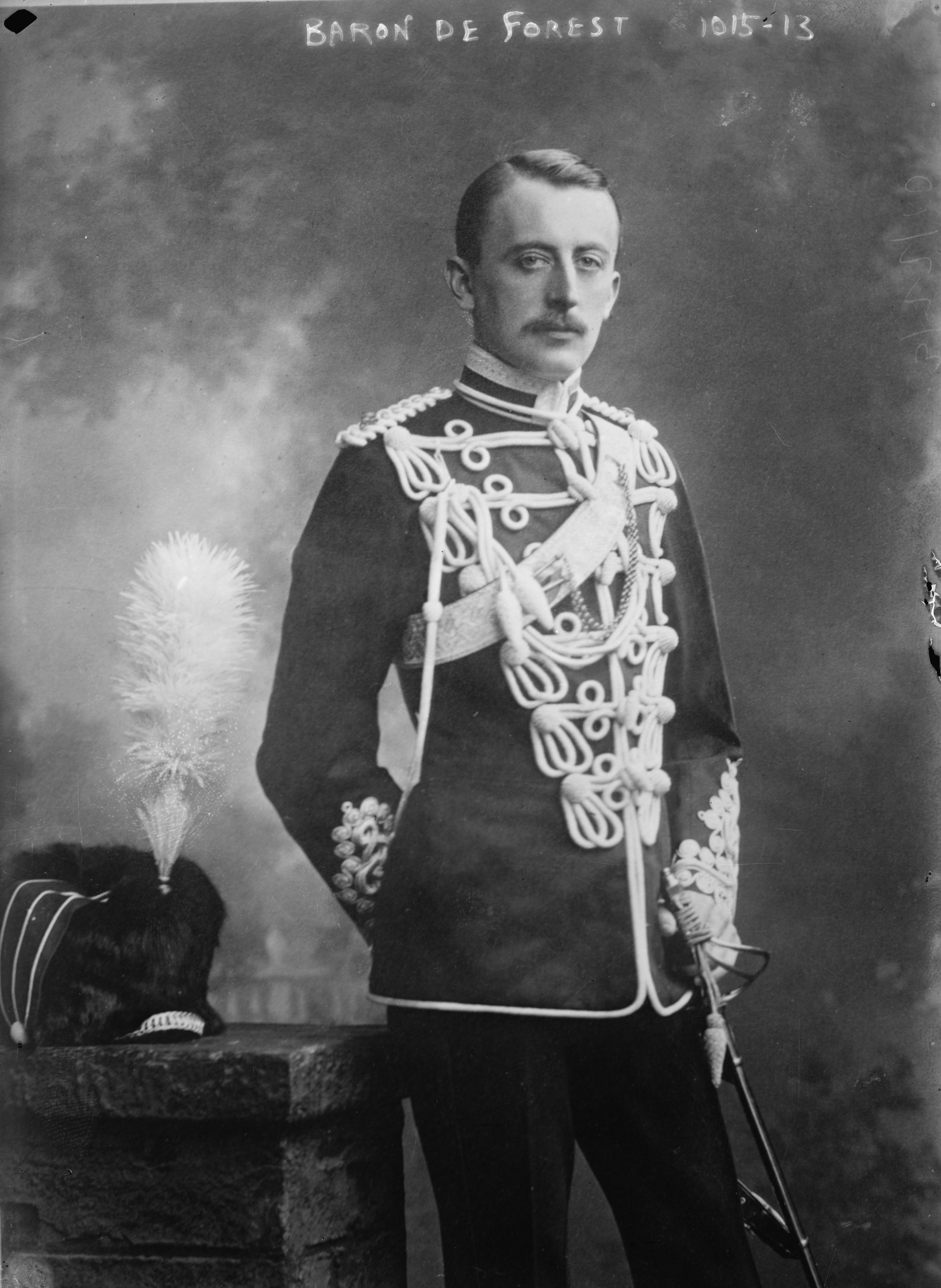
de Forest

Kennington
Party	Candidate	Votes	%	±%
Progressive	**John Benn**	3,290		
Progressive	Maurice de Forest	2,828		
Municipal Reform	P. F. Budge	2,421		
Municipal Reform	Cecil Ince	2,317		
Labour	John Gilbert Dale	900		
Majority				
Progressive **hold**		Swing		

Lambeth North
Party	Candidate	Votes	%	±%
Progressive	**Frank Briant**	2,262		
Labour	**Frank Smith**	1,930		
Municipal Reform	H Norris	1,780		
Municipal Reform	Henry Charlewood Turner	1,753		
Majority				
Progressive **hold**		Swing		
Labour **hold**		Swing		

Morrow

Norwood
Party	Candidate	Votes	%	±%
Municipal Reform	**Cecil Urquhart Fisher**	5,604		
Municipal Reform	**Forbes St John Morrow**	5,565		
Progressive	Nathaniel William Hubbard	3,698		
Progressive	Frederick Kellaway	3,552		
Majority				
Municipal Reform **hold**		Swing		

=== Lewisham ===
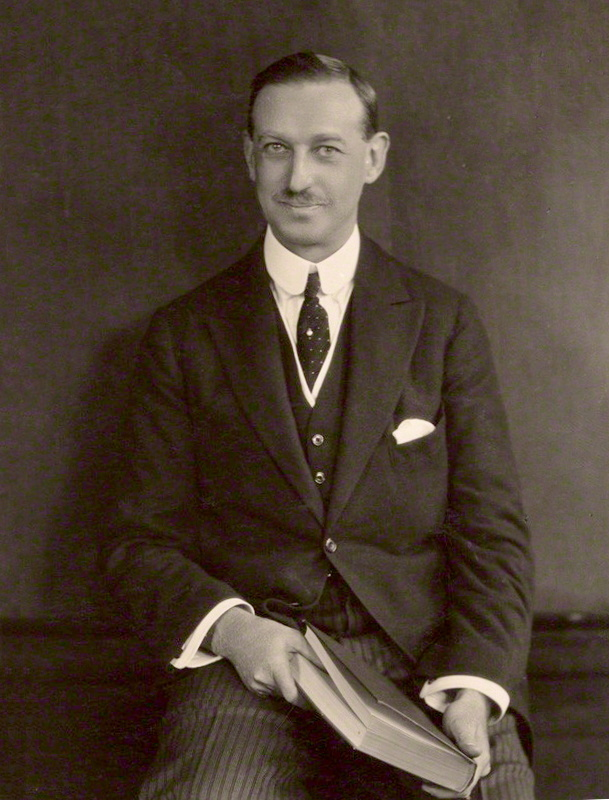
Stanhope

Lewisham
Party	Candidate	Votes	%	±%
Municipal Reform	James Stanhope	9,031		
Municipal Reform	Frederick Houston Carter	8,958		
Progressive	Arthur Robert Gridley	4,950		
Progressive	Gee	2,297		
Majority				
Municipal Reform **hold**		Swing		

=== Marylebone ===
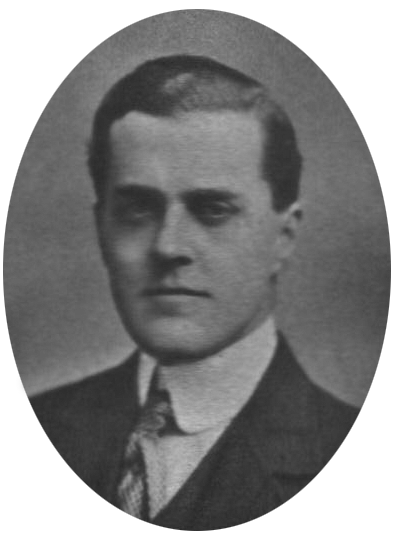
Thynne

Marylebone East
Party	Candidate	Votes	%	±%
Municipal Reform	Hercules Pakenham	3,089		
Municipal Reform	Alexander Thynne	3,056		
Progressive	H J Helsdon	1,100		
Progressive	Samuel Eli Hugo Kilner	1,050		
Majority				
Municipal Reform **hold**		Swing		

Marylebone West
Party	Candidate	Votes	%	±%
Municipal Reform	**Edward White**	3,710		
Municipal Reform	Susan Lawrence	3,681		
Progressive	Connelly	1,378		
Progressive	Frederick Dolman	1,359		
Majority				
Municipal Reform **hold**		Swing		

=== Newington ===
Dawes

Walworth
Party	Candidate	Votes	%	±%
Progressive	**James Arthur Dawes**	2,981		
Progressive	**Charles Jesson**	2,868		
Municipal Reform	Frederick Bird	2,029		
Municipal Reform	Collingwood Sproule	1,980		
Majority				
Progressive **hold**		Swing		

Newington West
Party	Candidate	Votes	%	±%
Progressive	**James Daniel Gilbert**	3,540		
Progressive	**Evan Spicer**	3,536		
Municipal Reform	Frank Henry Baber	2,483		
Municipal Reform	Richard Owen Roberts	2,470		
Majority				
Progressive **hold**		Swing		

=== Paddington ===
Hunter

Paddington North
Party	Candidate	Votes	%	±%
Municipal Reform	**John Herbert Hunter**	4,017		
Municipal Reform	Thomas Clarence Edward Goff	3,965		
Progressive	James Fairbank	3,882		
Progressive	Horace George Holmes	3,732		
Majority				
Municipal Reform **hold**		Swing		

Paddington South
Party	Candidate	Votes	%	±%
Municipal Reform	John Burgess Karslake	3,226		
Municipal Reform	Harry Barned Lewis-Barned	3,200		
Progressive	E E Hayward	984		
Progressive	Alfred Young Mayell	946		
Majority				
Municipal Reform **hold**		Swing		

=== St George's Hanover Square ===
Cheylesmore

St George's Hanover Square
Party	Candidate	Votes	%	±%
Municipal Reform	**Herbert Eaton**	4,283		
Municipal Reform	**Hubert John Greenwood**	4,243		
Progressive	Henry Thomas Mackenzie Bell	912		
Progressive	James Scott Duckers	884		
Majority				
Municipal Reform **hold**		Swing		

=== St Pancras ===
Lea

St. Pancras East
Party	Candidate	Votes	%	±%
Progressive	Hugh Lea	3,764		
Progressive	**Albert William Claremont**	3,678		
Municipal Reform	David Hazel	2,789		
Municipal Reform	Arthur Veasey	2,738		
Majority				
Progressive **hold**		Swing		

St. Pancras North
Party	Candidate	Votes	%	±%
Progressive	Thomas Frederick Hobson	3,552		
Progressive	Arthur Lewis Leon	3,507		
Municipal Reform	T. H. Russell	3,097		
Municipal Reform	Wyndham Clarke	3,022		
Majority				
Progressive **hold**		Swing		

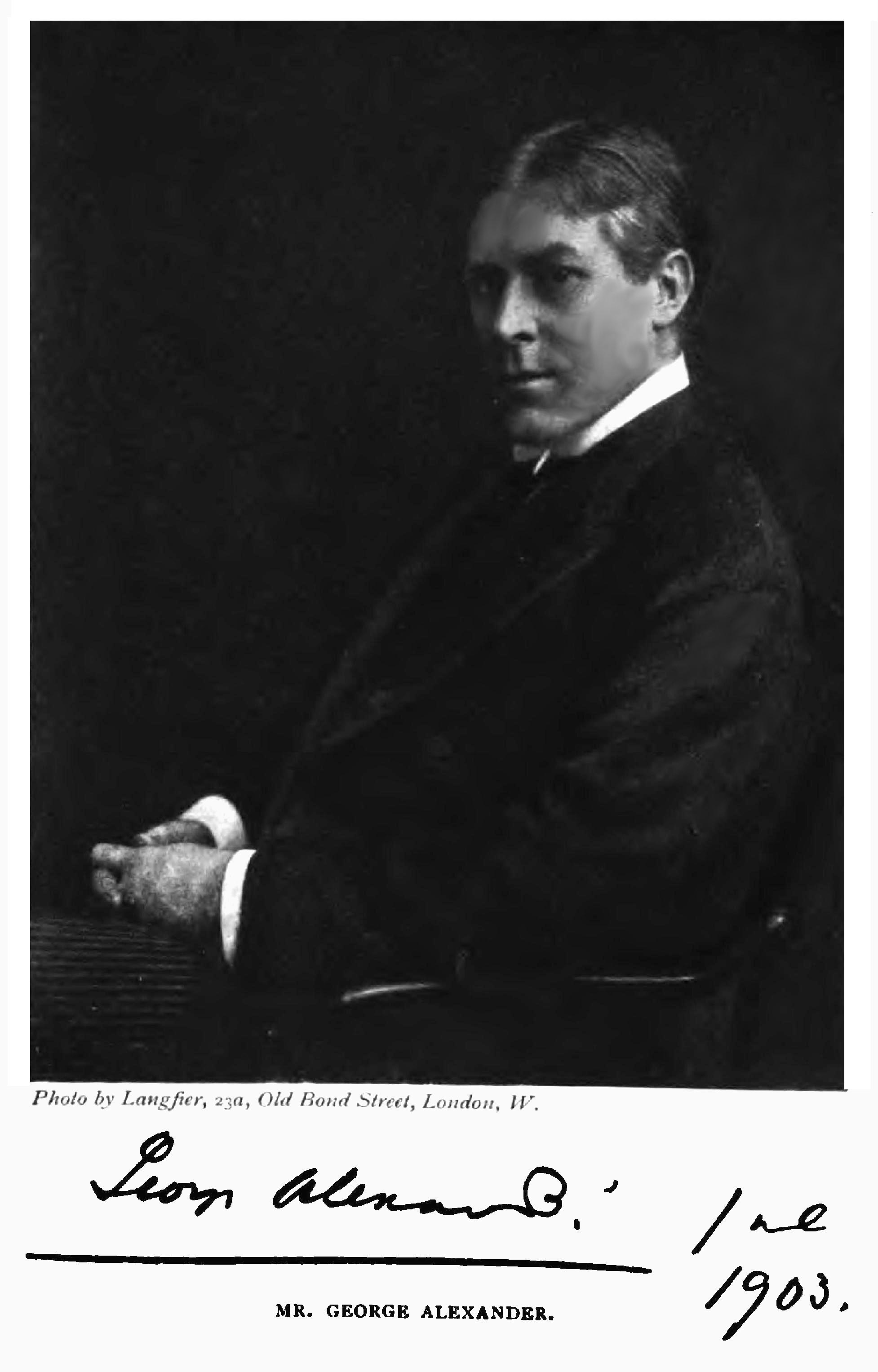
Alexander

St. Pancras South
Party	Candidate	Votes	%	±%
Municipal Reform	**George Alexander**	2,719		
Municipal Reform	John Denison-Pender	2,633		
Progressive	Frederick Hastings	1,281		
Progressive	Charles James Tarring	1,267		
Majority				
Municipal Reform **hold**		Swing		

Vosper

St. Pancras West
Party	Candidate	Votes	%	±%
Progressive	William Lloyd-Taylor	3,148		
Progressive	Samuel Lithgow	3,118		
Municipal Reform	**Percy Vosper**	2,969		
Municipal Reform	Richard Barnett	2,876		
Majority				
Progressive **gain** from Municipal Reform		Swing		
Progressive **gain** from Municipal Reform		Swing		

=== Shoreditch ===
Allen

Haggerston
Party	Candidate	Votes	%	±%
Progressive	Stephen Gee	2,845		
Progressive	Arthur Acland Allen	2,839		
Municipal Reform	**Gilbert Johnstone**	2,479		
Municipal Reform	G V Wellesley	2,358		
Majority				
Progressive **gain** from Municipal Reform		Swing		
Progressive **gain** from Municipal Reform		Swing		

Hoxton
Party	Candidate	Votes	%	±%
Progressive	Benjamin B Evans	3,645		
Progressive	Stanley Holmes	3,612		
Municipal Reform	C Ford	1,944		
Municipal Reform	Cecil Trotter	1,922		
Majority				
Progressive **gain** from Municipal Reform		Swing		
Progressive **gain** from Municipal Reform		Swing		

=== Southwark ===
Bermondsey
Party	Candidate	Votes	%	±%
Progressive	Charles Russell	3,288	24.5	
Progressive	William Henry Ecroyd	3,276	24.4	
Municipal Reform	Walter T Somerville	2,509	18.7	
Municipal Reform	Joseph Ricardo	2,470	18.4	
Labour	**Alfred Salter**	1,876	14.0	
Majority				
Progressive **hold**		Swing		
Progressive **gain** from Labour		Swing		

Rotherhithe
Party	Candidate	Votes	%	±%
Progressive	John Scott Lidgett	3,716		
Progressive	Robert Leishman Stuart	3,706		
Municipal Reform	H.G.L. Davidson	2,060		
Municipal Reform	Gilbert Hurst	2,058		
Majority				
Progressive **hold**		Swing		

Southwark West
Party	Candidate	Votes	%	±%
Progressive	**Albert Wilson**	2,907		
Progressive	**Thomas Hunter**	2,904		
Municipal Reform	Edward Matthews	2,542		
Municipal Reform	John Tyson Wigan	2,531		
Majority				
Progressive **hold**		Swing		

=== Strand ===
Pilditch

Strand
Party	Candidate	Votes	%	±%
Municipal Reform	**Clifford Probyn**	3,004		
Municipal Reform	Philip Pilditch	2,974		
Progressive	J. M. Dent	758		
Progressive	Samuel G Fenton	752		
Majority				
Municipal Reform **hold**		Swing		

=== Tower Hamlets ===
Bow and Bromley
Party	Candidate	Votes	%	±%
Labour	George Lansbury	4,002		
Progressive	George Lewis Bruce	3,442		
Municipal Reform	Horace Victor Rowe	2,507		
Municipal Reform	Alfred Moor-Radford	2,395		
Majority				
Labour **gain** from Municipal Reform		Swing		
Progressive **gain** from Municipal Reform		Swing		

Yeo

Limehouse
Party	Candidate	Votes	%	±%
Progressive	Alfred William Yeo	1,963		
Municipal Reform	**Cyril Jackson**	1,962		
Progressive	H J Ogden	1,930		
Municipal Reform	George Lillie Craik	1,825		
Majority				
Municipal Reform **hold**		Swing		
Progressive **gain** from Municipal Reform		Swing		

Mile End
Party	Candidate	Votes	%	±%
Progressive	Carl Stettauer	2,032		
Progressive	James May	2,016		
Municipal Reform	**Edward Holton Coumbe**	1,973		
Municipal Reform	Cecil Ince	1,924		
Majority				
Progressive **hold**		Swing		
Progressive **hold**		Swing		

Poplar
Party	Candidate	Votes	%	±%
Progressive	**John McDougall**	3,169		
Labour	Robert Ensor	2,835		
Municipal Reform	T. J. Clarke	1,883		
Majority				
Labour **gain** from Progressive		Swing		
Majority				
Progressive **hold**		Swing		

Gosling

St George's in the East
Party	Candidate	Votes	%	±%
Progressive	**Harry Gosling**	1,532		
Progressive	Charles James Mathew	1,492		
Municipal Reform	**Percy Coleman Simmons**	1,147		
Municipal Reform	G W Gilbert	887		
Independent	Frederick Wallace Brame	56		
Majority				
Progressive **hold**		Swing		
Progressive **gain** from Municipal Reform		Swing		

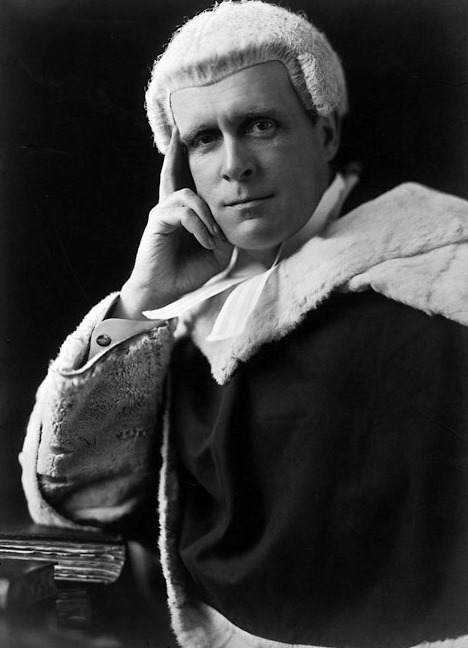
Sankey

Stepney
Party	Candidate	Votes	%	±%
Municipal Reform	**Alfred Ordway Goodrich**	1,809		
Municipal Reform	John Sankey	1,758		
Progressive	William Samuel Glyn-Jones	1,646		
Progressive	J M Myers	1,524		
Majority				
Municipal Reform **hold**		Swing		

Johnson

Whitechapel
Party	Candidate	Votes	%	±%
Progressive	**William Cowlishaw Johnson**	1,954		
Progressive	**Henry Herman Gordon**	1,950		
Municipal Reform	W. Dully	825		
Municipal Reform	John Benjamin Lindenbaum	813		
Majority				
Progressive **hold**		Swing		

=== Wandsworth ===
Wandsworth
Party	Candidate	Votes	%	±%
**Municipal Reform**	**William Hunt**	**12,806**		
Municipal Reform	John William Lorden	12,665		
Progressive	E A Sanders	6,722		
Progressive	John Dean	6,709		
Majority				
Municipal Reform **hold**		Swing		

=== Westminster ===
Westminster
Party	Candidate	Votes	%	±%
Municipal Reform	**Reginald White Granville-Smith**	2,907		
Municipal Reform	**Clement Young Sturge**	2,828		
Progressive	William Wheeler	1,018		
Progressive	C L Heywood	1,014		
Majority				
Municipal Reform **hold**		Swing		

=== Woolwich ===
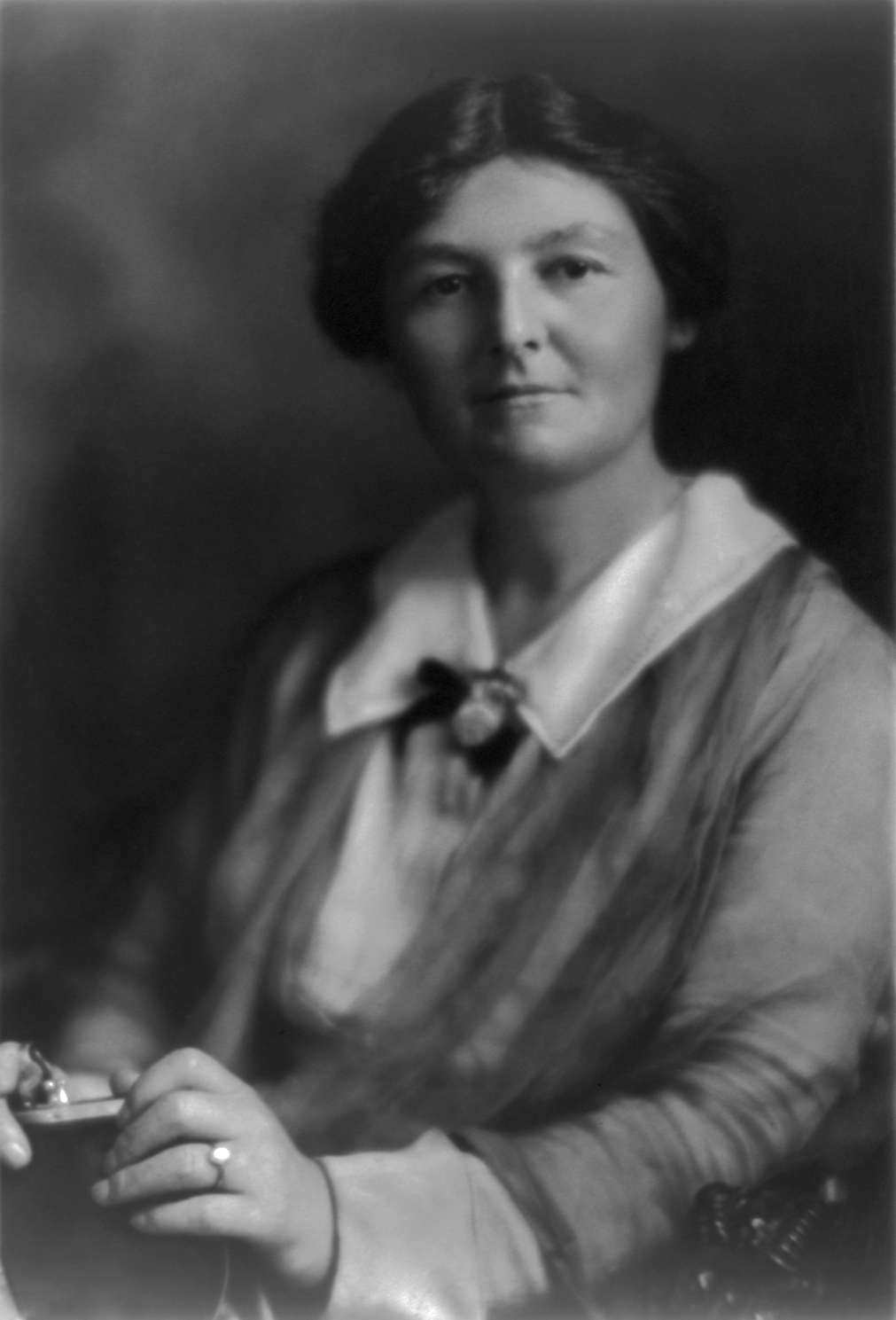
Bondfield

Woolwich
Party	Candidate	Votes	%	±%
Municipal Reform	**William James Squires**	7,956		
Municipal Reform	**Edward Aubrey Hastings Jay**	7,736		
Labour	Margaret Bondfield	6,931		
Labour	Jenkin Jones	6,789		
Majority				
Municipal Reform **hold**		Swing		
