= Constantine Scaramanga-Ralli =

British politician and author

Constantine Scaramanga-Ralli JP (17 July 1854 – 17 March 1934) was a British Liberal Party politician and author.

== Background ==
He was born in London as Constantine Ralli the eldest son of Pandeli Constantine Ralli and Harriet Ralli. He was educated at Harrow School and Brasenose College, Oxford. On 8 August 1910 his name was legally changed to Constantine Scaramanga-Ralli by Royal Licence. He married Julia Townsend Lawrence, of Long Island, New York (USA). They had one son and one daughter.

== Professional career ==
He was in the banking business for many years. He was an ardent advocate of compulsory military training, and an author of articles on this and kindred subjects in leading military journals and the magazines. He was a Life Governor of the Brompton Hospital for Consumption and Diseases of the Chest. He was a Justice of the Peace in Hampshire. He was Vice-President of the Allotments and Small Holdings Association of England.

== Political career ==
He was Liberal candidate for the Isle of Wight Division of Hampshire at the December 1910 General Election.

General Election December 1910: Isle of Wight
Party	Candidate	Votes	%	±%
Conservative	Douglas Bernard Hall	7,192	50.8	−0.2
Liberal	Constantine Scaramanga-Ralli	6,969	49.2	+0.2
Turnout		14,161	88.7	−2.3
Majority		223	1.6	−0.4
Conservative hold		Swing	-0.2	

In addition to standing as a parliamentary candidate, he stood as a candidate in 1913 for election to the London County Council for the Liberal backed Progressive Party;

London County Council election, 1913: City of London
Party	Candidate	Votes	%	±%
Municipal Reform	✓ James William Domoney	7,321		
Municipal Reform	✓ Hon. Gilbert Johnstone	7,279		
Municipal Reform	✓ William Henry Pannell	7,245		
Municipal Reform	✓ Herbert Stuart Sankey	7,206		
Progressive	Hon. Fitzroy Hemphill	1,708		
Progressive	Constantine Scaramanga-Ralli	1,647		
Progressive	Dr S. Miall	1,644		
Majority				
Municipal Reform hold		Swing		

== Publications ==
- Vanessa, 1904
- Plutocracy, 1907
- The Wisdom of the Serpent
- The Succession
- The Strange Story of Falconer Thring
- The Missing Monarch, 1907
- Julian Steele, 1908
- The Tyranny of Honour, 1911
