= London County Council elections =

The London County Council was elected every three years in peacetime from 1889 until 1961.

- 1889 London County Council election
- 1892 London County Council election
- 1895 London County Council election
- 1898 London County Council election
- 1901 London County Council election
- 1904 London County Council election
- 1907 London County Council election
- 1910 London County Council election
- 1913 London County Council election
- 1919 London County Council election
- 1922 London County Council election
- 1925 London County Council election
- 1928 London County Council election
- 1931 London County Council election
- 1934 London County Council election
- 1937 London County Council election
- 1946 London County Council election
- 1949 London County Council election
- 1952 London County Council election
- 1955 London County Council election
- 1958 London County Council election
- 1961 London County Council election
