= Southwark North (London County Council constituency) =

London County Council constituency

- Former constituency for the London County Council

Former constituency
- Created: 1919
- Abolished: 1949
- Member(s): 2
- Created from: Southwark West
- Replaced by: Southwark

Southwark North was a constituency used for elections to the London County Council between 1919 and 1949. The seat shared boundaries with the UK Parliament constituency of the same name.

== Councillors ==
Year	Name	Party	Name	Party
1919	Consuelo Vanderbilt	Progressive	Walter Wightman	Progressive
1920	James Owers Devereux	Progressive	Walter Wightman	Progressive
1922	James Owers Devereux	Progressive	Frank Percy Rider	Municipal Reform
1925	James Owers Devereux	Progressive Ratepayers	Thomas George Gibbings	Labour
1928	James Hyndman MacDonnell	Labour	Thomas George Gibbings	Labour
1931	James Hyndman MacDonnell	Labour	Charles Brook	Labour
1942	James Hyndman MacDonnell	Labour	Thomas George Gibbings	Labour

== Election results ==
1919 London County Council election: Southwark North
Party	Candidate	Votes	%	±%
Progressive	Consuelo Vanderbilt	2,602	39.9	
Progressive	Walter James Wightman	2,392	36.7	
Labour	John Osborne	764	11.7	
Labour	S. G. Weaver	761	11.7	
Majority		1,628	25.0	
Progressive hold		Swing		
Progressive hold		Swing		

Southwark North by-election, 1920
Party	Candidate	Votes	%	±%
Progressive	James Owers Devereux	2,314	57.6	
Labour	Herbert Morrison	1,703	42.4	
Majority		611		
Progressive hold		Swing		

1922 London County Council election: Southwark North
Party	Candidate	Votes	%	±%
Progressive	James Owers Devereux	4,453	32.1	−7.8
Municipal Reform	Frank Percy Rider	4,306	31.0	N/A
Labour	Holford Knight	2,565	18.5	+6.8
Labour	T. P. Stevens	2,553	18.4	+6.7
Majority		1,741	12.5	−12.5
Municipal Reform gain from Progressive		Swing		
Progressive hold		Swing		

1925 London County Council election: Southwark North
Party	Candidate	Votes	%	±%
Progressive	James Owers Devereux	5,673		
Labour	C. E. Gibbings	2,661		
Labour	James Hyndman MacDonnell	2,630		
Municipal Reform	F. Richardson	2,565		
Majority				
Labour gain from Municipal Reform		Swing		
Progressive hold		Swing		

1928 London County Council election: Southwark North
Party	Candidate	Votes	%	±%
Labour	Thomas George Gibbings	3,156		
Labour	James Hyndman MacDonnell	3,132		
Liberal	Edgar Bonham-Carter	3,098		
Liberal	Herbert Arthur Baker	2,925		
Municipal Reform	F. H. Bowyer	1,383		
Municipal Reform	Arthur Capewell	1,244		
Majority				
Labour gain from Progressive		Swing		
Labour hold		Swing		

1931 London County Council election: Southwark North
Party	Candidate	Votes	%	±%
Labour	James Hyndman MacDonnell	2,703		
Labour	Charles Brook	2,667		
Anti-Socialist	L. C. Downman	2,400		
Anti-Socialist	S. V. Gledhill	2,333		
Organised Unemployed	W. Southwell	166		
Organised Unemployed	E. J. Pullen	132		
Majority				
Labour hold		Swing		
Labour hold		Swing		

1934 London County Council election: Southwark North
Party	Candidate	Votes	%	±%
Labour	James Hyndman MacDonnell	4,404		
Labour	Charles Brook	4,356		
Municipal Reform	Ivor Guest	2,296		
Municipal Reform	E. Wickham	2,254		
Majority				
Labour hold		Swing		
Labour hold		Swing		

1937 London County Council election: Southwark North
Party	Candidate	Votes	%	±%
Labour	Charles Brook	4,789		
Labour	James Hyndman MacDonnell	4,738		
Municipal Progressive	Scott	3,053		
Municipal Progressive	J. R. Gardiner	2,982		
Majority				
Labour hold		Swing		
Labour hold		Swing		

1946 London County Council election: Southwark North
Party	Candidate	Votes	%	±%
Labour	James Hyndman MacDonnell	1,779		
Labour	Thomas George Gibbings	1,762		
National Liberal	Lucy Ashley-Brereton	602		
Conservative	A. E. Taylor	600		
Majority				
Labour hold		Swing		
Labour hold		Swing		
