= Edmund Charles Rawlings =

Edmund Rawlings

Edmund Charles Rawlings JP (11 December 1854 – 17 December 1917), was a British solicitor, a Liberal Party politician, and a prominent Primitive Methodist. He served as mayor of Hammersmith.

== Family ==
Rawlings was born on 11 December 1854 at Wallingford, Oxfordshire to parents Edmund Rawlings (a Primitive Methodist minister) and Susannah Cock. He moved to London aged 14, becoming a solicitor in 1879 and forming a partnership in the City of London at Walbrook with Mr S Alford Butt (also the son of a Primitive Methodist minister). He married Amy Yates (1857-1914) in 1879 at Wilton, Wiltshire, and they had three children. He died on 17 December 1917 in Ealing.

== Political career ==
In October 1900 Rawlings contested the UK General Election as Liberal candidate for Islington North.

In November 1900 he was elected a Hammersmith Borough Councillor at Hammersmith's first borough council elections. He was later appointed an Alderman of the borough council. He also served as Mayor of Hammersmith from 1906-07.

He stood several times for election to the London County Council as a Progressive candidate, without success. In 1895 and 1901 he contested Hammersmith. In 1910 he contested the City of London.

Rawlings took an active part in the relief of the unemployed and assistance of cripples. He also served as a Justice of the Peace for the County of London.

=== Electoral record ===
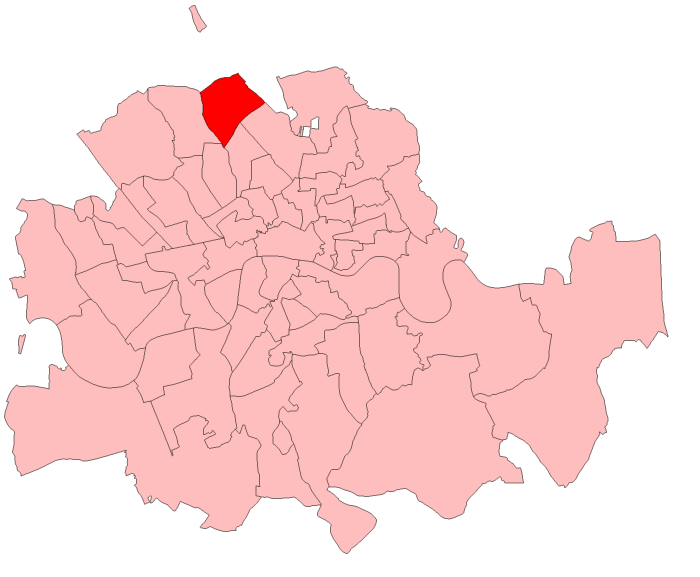
Islington North in London 1900

General Election 1900: Islington North
Party	Candidate	Votes	%	±%
Conservative	George Trout Bartley	4,881	65.5	
Liberal	Edmund Charles Rawlings	2,567	34.5	
Majority		2,314	31.0	
Turnout			62.3	
Conservative hold		Swing		

Hammersmith in London 1900

1901 London County Council election: Hammersmith
Party	Candidate	Votes	%	±%
Conservative	Edward Collins	3,128	26.1	−2.4
Conservative	Jocelyn Brandon	3,110	25.9	−2.2
Progressive	WT Lord	2,885	24.0	+2.2
Progressive	Edmund Charles Rawlings	2,874	24.0	+2.4
Conservative hold		Swing	-2.3	

1910 London County Council election: City of London
Party	Candidate	Votes	%	±%
Municipal Reform	Nathaniel Louis Cohen	5,413	21.0	
Municipal Reform	James William Domoney	5,404	20.9	
Municipal Reform	Herbert Stuart Sankey	5,383	20.9	
Municipal Reform	William Henry Pannell	5,370	20.8	
Progressive	Edmund Charles Rawlings	1,439	5.6	
Progressive	Harold James Glanville	1,403	5.4	
Progressive	Samuel Lammas Dore	1,403	5.4	
Progressive	Frederick Link	1,393	5.4	
Majority				
Municipal Reform hold		Swing		

== Religious activities ==
Rawlings was prominently involved with the Primitive Methodist movement, serving as vice-president and addressing its June 1905 conference in Scarborough. He wrote two PM publications: the Free Churchman's Legal Handbook, and (with a Dr Townsend) the Free Churchman’s Guide to the Education Act of 1902.
