= Southwark West (London County Council constituency) =

London County Council constituency

- Former constituency for the London County Council

Former constituency
- Created: 1889
- Abolished: 1919
- Member(s): 2
- Replaced by: Southwark North

Southwark West was a constituency used for elections to the London County Council between 1889 and 1919. The seat shared boundaries with the UK Parliament constituency of the same name.

== Councillors ==
Year	Name	Party	Name	Party
1889	Alfred Henry Haggis	Progressive	John George Rhodes	Progressive
1892	Edric Bayley	Progressive	Thomas Hunter	Progressive
1907	Albert Wilson	Progressive	Thomas Hunter	Progressive
1918	Albert Wilson	Progressive	Consuelo Vanderbilt	Progressive

== Election results ==
1889 London County Council election: Southwark West
Party	Candidate	Votes	%	±%
Progressive	Alfred Henry Haggis	2,030		
Progressive	John George Rhodes	2,024		
Moderate	Thomas Francis Rider	1,431		
Independent	Robert Drewitt Hilton	869		
Moderate	Henry Kenwyn Stopes	776		
Progressive win (new seat)				
Progressive win (new seat)				

1892 London County Council election: Southwark West
Party	Candidate	Votes	%	±%
Progressive	Thomas Hunter	2,727		
Progressive	Edric Bayley	2,720		
Moderate	F. Baxter	1,286		
Moderate	Edward Bond	1,178		
Labour Progressive hold		Swing		
Progressive hold		Swing		

1895 London County Council election: Southwark West
Party	Candidate	Votes	%	±%
Progressive	Thomas Hunter	2,437		
Progressive	Edric Bayley	2,374		
Moderate	H. F. Barclay	1,985		
Moderate	G. J. Newton	1,859		
Progressive hold		Swing		
Progressive hold		Swing		

1898 London County Council election: Southwark West
Party	Candidate	Votes	%	±%
Progressive	Thomas Hunter	2,578		
Progressive	Edric Bayley	2,575		
Moderate	Oscar Berry	1,201		
Moderate	W. C. Copeland	1,193		
Progressive hold		Swing		

1901 London County Council election: Southwark West
Party	Candidate	Votes	%	±%
Progressive	Edric Bayley	unopposed	n/a	n/a
Progressive	Thomas Hunter	unopposed	n/a	n/a
Progressive hold		Swing		
Progressive hold		Swing	n/a	

1904 London County Council election: Southwark West
Party	Candidate	Votes	%	±%
Progressive	Thomas Hunter	2,285		
Progressive	Edric Bayley	2,283		
Conservative	J. T. Scriven	1,550		
Conservative	E. M. Judge	1,547		
Majority				
Progressive hold		Swing		

1907 London County Council election: Southwark West
Party	Candidate	Votes	%	±%
Progressive	Thomas Hunter	2,998		
Progressive	Albert Wilson	2,953		
Municipal Reform	J. T. Scriven	2,746		
Municipal Reform	F. Gillett	2,649		
Majority				
Progressive hold		Swing		

1910 London County Council election: Southwark West
Party	Candidate	Votes	%	±%
Progressive	Albert Wilson	2,907		
Progressive	Thomas Hunter	2,904		
Municipal Reform	Edward Matthews	2,542		
Municipal Reform	John Tyson Wigan	2,531		
Majority				
Progressive hold		Swing		

1913 London County Council election: Southwark West
Party	Candidate	Votes	%	±%
Progressive	Albert Wilson	2,642		
Progressive	Thomas Hunter	2,831		
Municipal Reform	H. Edwards	2,105		
Municipal Reform	Walter Somerville	2,070		
Majority		726		
Progressive hold		Swing		
Progressive hold		Swing		
