= Newington West (London County Council constituency) =

Constituency used for elections

- Former constituency for the London County Council

Former constituency
- Created: 1889
- Abolished: 1919
- Member(s): 2
- Replaced by: Southwark Central

Newington West was a constituency used for elections to the London County Council between 1889 and 1919. The seat shared boundaries with the UK Parliament constituency of the same name.

== Councillors ==
Year	Name	Party	Name	Party
1889	William Gibson Bott	Progressive	Albert Bassett Hopkins	Progressive
1895	Frank Russell	Progressive	William Marcus Thompson	Progressive
1898	James Daniel Gilbert	Progressive	John Piggott	Progressive
1907	James Daniel Gilbert	Progressive	Evan Spicer	Progressive

== Election results ==
1889 London County Council election: Newington West
Party	Candidate	Votes	%	±%
Progressive	William Gibson Bott	1,656		
Progressive	Albert Bassett Hopkins	1,594		
Independent	Eli Marsh Mullins	1,084		
Moderate	Walter Sydney Sichel	803		
Moderate	Frederick Sutton	793		
Progressive win (new seat)				
Progressive win (new seat)				

1892 London County Council election: Newington West
Party	Candidate	Votes	%	±%
Progressive	William Gibson Bott	2,670		
Progressive	Albert Bassett Hopkins	2,654		
Moderate	Edward Alfred Goulding	1,336		
Moderate	Charles Henry Hawtrey	1,303		
Progressive hold		Swing		
Progressive hold		Swing		

1895 London County Council election: Newington West
Party	Candidate	Votes	%	±%
Progressive	Frank Russell	2,442		
Progressive	William Marcus Thompson	2,425		
Moderate	J. V. Vesey-Fitzgerald	1,518		
Moderate	J. J. Robins	1,517		
Progressive hold		Swing		
Progressive hold		Swing		

1898 London County Council election: Newington West
Party	Candidate	Votes	%	±%
Progressive	James Daniel Gilbert	2,639		
Progressive	John Piggott	2,598		
Moderate	William Lansdale	1,383		
Moderate	A. A. Bethune	1,368		
Socialist	W. Langley	194		
Progressive hold		Swing		
Progressive hold		Swing		

1901 London County Council election: Newington West
Party	Candidate	Votes	%	±%
Progressive	John Piggott	3,020	39.6	+7.1
Progressive	James Daniel Gilbert	3,009	39.4	+6.4
Conservative	William Lansdale	822	10.8	−6.5
Conservative	Thomas Hoare	779	10.2	−6.9
Progressive hold		Swing		
Progressive hold		Swing	+6.7	

1904 London County Council election: Newington West
Party	Candidate	Votes	%	±%
Progressive	John Piggott	3,244		
Progressive	James Daniel Gilbert	3,029		
Conservative	William Lansdale	1,380		
Conservative	H. C. Gibbings	1,356		
Majority				
Progressive hold		Swing		

1907 London County Council election: Newington West
Party	Candidate	Votes	%	±%
Progressive	Evan Spicer	3,778		
Progressive	James Daniel Gilbert	3,759		
Municipal Reform	A. Waddell	2,705		
Municipal Reform	H. Jarvis	2,700		
Majority				
Progressive hold		Swing		

1910 London County Council election: Newington West
Party	Candidate	Votes	%	±%
Progressive	James Daniel Gilbert	3,540		
Progressive	Evan Spicer	3,536		
Municipal Reform	Frank Henry Baber	2,483		
Municipal Reform	Richard Owen Roberts	2,470		
Majority				
Progressive hold		Swing		

1913 London County Council election: Newington West
Party	Candidate	Votes	%	±%
Progressive	James Daniel Gilbert	3,161		
Progressive	Evan Spicer	3,097		
Municipal Reform	Edgar Abbott	2,268		
Municipal Reform	Richard Owen Roberts	2,222		
Majority				
Progressive hold		Swing		
Progressive hold		Swing		
