= Miriam Moses =

British politician, philanthropist and social reformer

Miriam Moses OBE JP
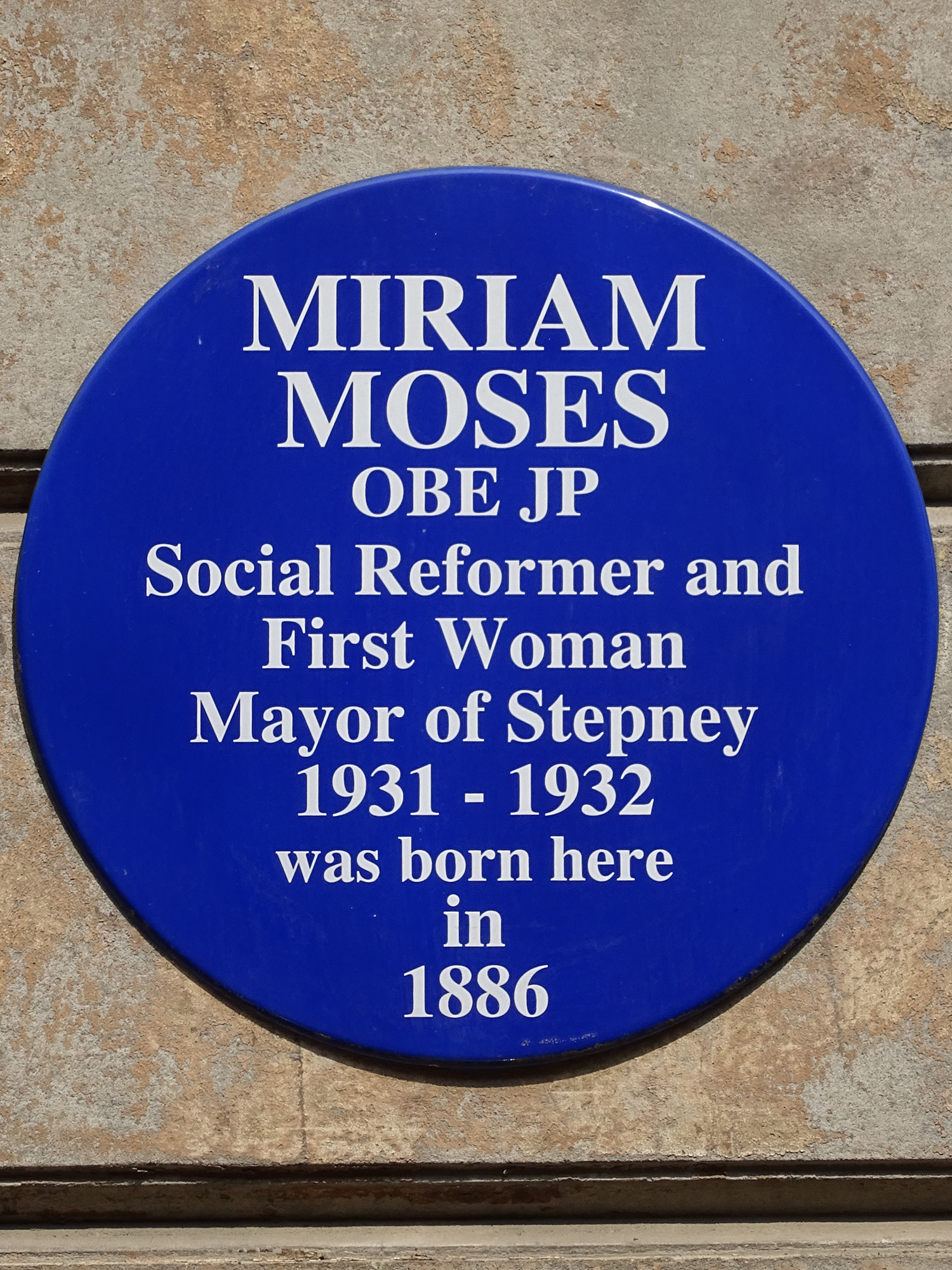
- Moses's blue plaque

Mayor of Stepney
- In office 1931–1932

Personal details
- Born: 13 November 1884 Spitalfields, London
- Died: 24 June 1965 (aged 80) Fitzrovia, London
- Party: Liberal Party

Miriam Moses OBE JP (13 November 1884 — 24 June 1965) was a British Liberal politician, philanthropist and social reformer. She served as the first female mayor of Stepney, and the first female Jewish mayor in the United Kingdom.

== Early life ==
Moses was on born on Princelet Street in Spitalfields in the East End of London on 13 November 1884 to Jewish parents Mark and Hannah Moses. Her father had been born in Torun, then in Germany, and had come to the United Kingdom in 1863 at the age of eight. In London, Mark Moses became a tailor, local councillor, justice of the peace and member of the Board of Deputies of British Jews. He would go down to the docks and meet newly arrived Jews and offer them support. Her mother was a charity worker. Miriam Moses studied at Old Castle Street school in Whitechapel.

When Miriam was 16 years old her mother died, and she took over the care of her eight brothers and sisters. She would also support newly arrived Jewish immigrants who turned up at their house in need of help.

At 18 years old she got involved in a local Penny Dinner scheme, to provide the poor with a nutritious meal for a penny.

== Political career ==
Moses stood for election under the label of the Progressive Party, which was a party for local elections in London based around the Liberal Party with initial support from the Labour Party. By the time Moses contested elections, Labour was competing against the Progressives, and in 1925 the label was retired across the city and she stood as an independent candidate. She was chair of the Whitechapel Liberal Association for many years.

In 1921, Moses became a Progressive councillor for Spitalfields East ward in the East End of London, replacing her father upon his death. She held the seat until standing down in 1934, when the ward returned Labour councillors. The Labour Party's failure to take the seat until then has been credited to Moses's personal popularity, which was reflected in her heading the polls in the ward by a substantial majority at every election. One of her colleagues suggested that her social work meant that many Jewish voters associated her more with her community work than her politics.

Moses unsuccessfully sought the Liberal nomination for the 1930 Whitechapel and St Georges by-election. The municipal election of 1931 had resulted in a hung council, with thirty Conservative-aligned Municipal Reform Party councillors, twenty-six Labour councillors and four independents including Moses. With the support of Municipal Reform Councillors, Moses narrowly defeated Labour's J. H. Hall to be elected as the first female Mayor of Stepney, and the first female Jewish mayor in the country. Labour opponents questioned her personal integrity, with some describing her as "Shylock" following her election.

She supported the municipal provision of contraception for poor mothers, and in 1933 proposed a Jewish charitable solution for funding a housing programme. She opposed giving exceptions to Sunday trading laws for Jewish traders. She supported Henrietta Adler in condemning anti-immigrant housing policies of the Municipal Reform Party in 1932.

Moses's personal political style has been described as "crusading zeal".

== Women's rights ==
Moses was a member of the Jewish League for Women’s Suffrage, campaigned for the municipal provision of contraception for poor mothers, and supported women victims of domestic violence through her work as a magistrate. But she also argued that working mothers were causing the breakdown of family.

== Social work ==
Moses was school manager for two local schools, and served on committees for local charities and the board of guardians, which was responsible for implementing the Poor Law. In 1922, she became the first female justice of the peace in Whitechapel. With Elsie Cohen, she co-founded the Brady Girls' Club in 1925, as a parallel to the older Brady Boys' Club, which was one of the first Jewish boys' clubs in the country.

During the First World War, Moses served as a nurse in the Voluntary Aid Detachment at Bancroft Hospital, now known as Mile End Hospital. In 1923 she successfully petitioned the Mile End Board of Guardians to provide culturally appropriate meals to Jewish patients at the hospital,

Moses was chief air raid officer for her neighbourhood throughout the Second World War. With thousands of homes destroyed during the Blitz, Moses opened up a hostel at the Brady Girls Club for 50 homeless girls, ensuring they received kosher food. In 1945, she was made an Officer of the Order of the British Empire for her bravery in the latter role.

Former Brady Girls have described Moses as "very stern, very upright". They also said she had a "softer, kinder side". She also believed delinquent children benefitted from a good beating by their fathers.

== Religion ==
An observant Orthodox Jew, Moses served on the Board of Deputies representing New Synagogue on Stamford Hill—the first woman representing any constituent of the United Synagogue. In this role, she pushed for women's voting rights for the executive of the United Synagogue, succeeding in 1954. She was a founder member of the League of Jewish Women, later serving as president. She also served on the executives of the Jewish Board of Guardians and the Association of Jewish Youth. She was a member of the Jewish League for Woman Suffrage.

== In popular culture ==
Miriam Moses appeared on This Is Your Life in 1958.

== Death ==
Moses died on 24 June 1965 at Middlesex Hospital. In her obituary in the New Bradian they wrote: "To us in Brady she was very much more than a Warden of a building. She was Brady itself."
