= John Ernest Matthews =

John Ernest Matthews (1848 or 1849 – 26 April 1930) was a British politician.

Matthews was, for many years, a member of Matthews and Luff, a London-based shipbroking firm. He developed an interest in progressive politics, joining the Fabian Society in 1896, and was elected as a Progressive Party member of Hornsey Urban District Council. He also served on London County Council from 1900, when he was elected unopposed in St George's in the East, until the 1901 election, when he lost the seat. From 1901 until 1902, he served on the executive of the Fabian Society.
