= Thomas Brooke-Hitching =

English businessman and politician (1858–1926)

- Born: 1858
- Died: 4 February 1926 (aged 67–68)
- Occupation: businessman
- Spouse: Sarah Kussuth Brooke

Sir Thomas Henry Brooke-Hitching (1858 – 4 February 1926) was a British businessman and Conservative politician in London.

== Background and family ==
Thomas Henry Hitching was born in 1858, the son of John Walter Hitching, of Halifax, Yorkshire. He married in 1878 Sarah Kussuth Brooke, daughter of David Brooke of Stannary, and later adopted the surname of Brooke-Hitching by Royal licence. They had two sons.

He was Chairman of Hitchings Ltd., of Bond-street.

== Civic career ==
Brooke-Hitching had a long career in the City of London. He was a Common Councilman in the City of London from 1892, and was one of the prime movers in the creation of separate municipalities for London (which occurred in 1900 following the London Government Act 1899). He was later a Mayor of the Metropolitan Borough of St Marylebone. In December 1900 he was elected to represent the City on the London School Board, serving until the board was abolished in 1904.

He was elected a Sheriff of the City of London in 1902 (serving October 1902 to September 1903), together with George Wyatt Truscott. He was made a Knight Bachelor while he was sheriff, in the November 1902 Birthday Honours list, and was knighted by King Edward VII at Buckingham Palace on 18 December 1902. During his year as Sheriff, he accompanied the Lord Mayor (Sir Marcus Samuel) on an official visit to the English city Newcastle upon Tyne (November 1902), where they made a journey down the River Tyne, and visited the Elswick works.

Brooke-Hitching was elected to the London County Council for the City of London in March 1904, where he represented the Municipal Reform Party, a local party in London allied to the parliamentary Conservative Party. He was the Conservative candidate for the Elland parliamentary constituency in Yorkshire in the 1906 general election, but lost and did not take another attempt at a parliamentary career.

He was on the Commission for the Lieutenancy for City of London from November 1902, and received several foreign awards during his years in the City, including Officer of the Legion of Honour of France, Officer of the Order of Leopold II of Belgium, Grand Cross of the Order of St Sava from the Kingdom of Serbia, and the Order of Prince Danilo I from the Kingdom of Montenegro.

He was a shareholder in the 1906-7 Parkside development at 42 Knightsbridge.

He served as Master of the Guild of Freemen of the City of London in 1911.

Brooke-Hitching died on 4 February 1926.
