= Henry Clarke (London politician) =

British businessman and local politician

Henry Clarke (died 22 July 1914) was a British businessman and local politician in London.

Clarke carried out business at Gracechurch Street in the City of London as a coal importer and commission merchant. In 1883 he was elected to the Common Council of the City of London as a representative of Bishopsgate Ward, a post he held until his death. He was chairman of the City's Library Committee in 1887, and in 1897 commissioned and donated a painting by Andrew Carrick Gow to the Guildhall Art Gallery to mark the Diamond Jubilee of Queen Victoria. In the same year he was made a Deputy Lieutenant of the City.

When the first London County Council elections were held in January 1889, Clarke was elected as one of four councillors representing the City of London, and was appointed chairman of the Improvements Committee. He held the seat until he retired from the council in March 1904, having the honour of serving as Deputy Chairman of the council in 1902-1903. He was also one of the county council's representatives on the Metropolitan Water Board.

Clarke was a resident of Hampstead, in north west London, and following his retirement from the council remained active as a justice of the peace, serving as chairman of the Hampstead magistrates. He died suddenly at his Hampstead home in July 1914, aged 82.
