= 1946 London County Council election =

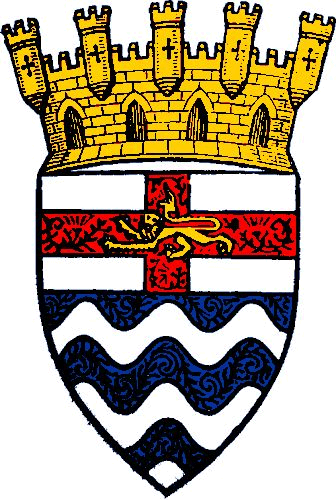
- 7 March 1946
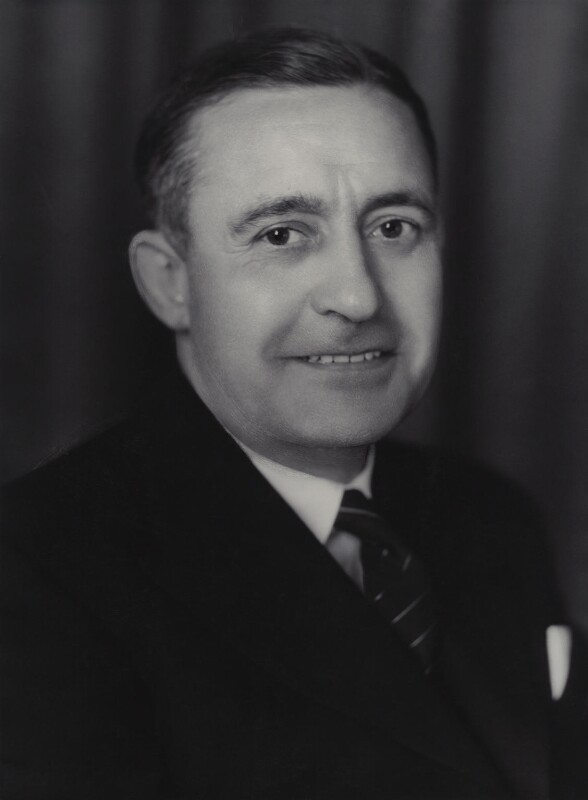

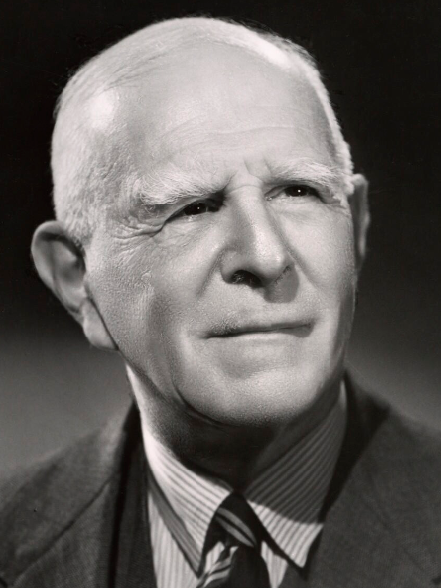
| | First party | Second party |
|---|---|---|
| | | Con |
| Leader | Charles Latham | Harold Webbe |
| Party | Labour | Conservative |
| Leader since | 1933 | 1936 |
| Leader's seat | Alderman | City of London |
| Last election | 76 | 48 |
| Seats won | 90 | 30 |
| Seat change | ▲14 | ▼18 |
| | Third party | Fourth party |
| | CPGB |
| Leader | Ted Bramley and Jack Gaster | Percy Harris |
| Party | Communist | Liberal |
| Leader's seat | Mile End | Bethnal Green South West |
| Last election | 0 | 0 |
| Seats won | 2 | 2 |
| Seat change | ▲2 | ▲2 |
| Popular vote | 15,353 | 11,119 |

An election to the County Council of London took place on 7 March 1946. The council was elected by First Past the Post with each elector having two votes in the two-member seats. The Labour Party once more made gains, again increasing their majority over the Conservative Party.

== Campaign ==
Due to World War II, no election had been held to the council since 1937.

The Labour Party stood candidates in all constituencies except the City of London, and Westminster St George's. Its manifesto proposed a major programme of house building, new schools, and the adoption of the County of London Plan. The Conservative Party proposed appointing a housing director with responsibility for the construction of new houses, and opposed building large secondary schools, instead arguing for smaller technical schools.

== Results ==
The Labour Party won its largest ever majority, gaining eighteen seats from the Conservative Party. The Manchester Guardian argued that the Conservatives would be satisfied with the election, despite their losses, as their results were better than in the 1945 UK general election. However, Labour lost two seats to the Liberal Party, which had not been represented on the council since 1934, and two to the Communist Party of Great Britain, which had never previously held seats on the council.

Turnout at the election was 26.4%, the lowest since the 1919 London County Council election. While it was as high as 34.6% in Fulham West, it was a mere 11.8% in Shoreditch.

| Party | Votes | | | Seats | |
| Party | Number | % | Stood | Seats | % |
|---|---|---|---|---|---|
| Labour | 291,138 | 55.0 | 118 | 90 | 72.6 |
| Conservative | 222,840 | 42.1 | 100 | 30 | 24.2 |
| Communist | 15,353 | | 10 | 2 | 1.6 |
| Liberal | 11,119 | | 6 | 2 | 1.6 |
| National Liberal | 1,930 | | 3 | 0 | 0.0 |
| British People's Party | 1,916 | | 6 | 0 | 0.0 |
| Independent | 1,184 | | 2 | 0 | 0.0 |
