= Fitzroy Hemphill, 3rd Baron Hemphill =

British baron and Liberal Party politician

Fitzroy Hemphill

Fitzroy Hemphill (21 November 1860–1930), was a British baron and Liberal Party politician, the son of Charles Hare Hemphill, the first baron, and he succeeded his brother to the barony on 26 March 1918. Fitzroy was a barrister of the Middle Temple from 1899, served as a justice of the peace for County Galway. As well as politics he was a captain in 2nd battalion King's Own Scottish Borderers; a representative member of London's Territorial Force, Justice of the peace in Galway, Ireland; and 'Chevalier' of the Legion of Honour.

His mother was Augusta Stanhope, the daughter of the Hon. Sir Charles Francis Stanhope, a son of Charles Stanhope, 3rd Earl of Harrington. He married Mary Martyn on 27 February 1897, and they had one son, Martyn, who succeeded his father to the barony.

== Arms ==
Coat of arms of Fitzroy Hemphill, 3rd Baron Hemphill
Crest A boar passant Gules charged with a chevron and a portcullis Or. Escutcheon Or on a fess Gules between two chevronels and three stars Azure as many trefoils slipped of the field. Supporters On either side an Irish wolfhound gorged with a plain collar Or. Motto Constanter Ac Non Timide (Steadily and Fearlessly)

Peerage of the United Kingdom
Preceded by Stanhope Hemphill	Baron Hemphill; 1919–1930	Succeeded by Martyn Hemphill
