= Stuart Sankey (barrister) =

British barrister and politician

Colonel Sir Herbert Stuart Sankey KBE CVO VD JP DL (4 May 1854 – 5 April 1940) was a British barrister and politician. The son of Lieutenant-Colonel H. T. Sankey, he was educated at Marlborough School and Christ Church, Oxford before being called to the bar at the Inner Temple in 1878. He married Josephine Annesley in 1884, and they had two daughters.

== Career ==
Sankey practised as a barrister on the South Eastern Circuit, and as a counsel for HM Treasury. He held the offices of recorder of Fordwich from 1883-1902, Faversham from 1902–05 and Margate from 1905–13.

In 1901, he was elected to the London County Council as one of four councillors representing the City of London. Re-elected in 1904, 1907 and 1910, he remained a member of the council until 1913. He served as vice-chairman for 1907-08. From 1909 to 1913 he was commanding officer of the Inns of Court Officers' Training Corps, and received the brevet rank of colonel in 1913.

In 1913 he was appointed as Remembrancer of the City of London, a position he held until 1927. He was also a governor, deputy-treasurer and almoner of Christ's Hospital; a governor of The Regent Street Polytechnic and a member of the board of management of St Mary's Hospital.

Invested as a Commander of the Victorian Order (CVO) in 1918, Sankey was made Knight Commander of the Order of the British Empire (KBE) in the 1927 Birthday Honours. He was also awarded a number of foreign orders.

Legal offices
Preceded by Adrian Pollock	Remembrancer of the City of London; 1913 - 1927	Succeeded by John Bridge Aspinall
