= Municipal Reform Party =

- Founded: 1906
- Dissolved: 1946
- Succeeded by: London Conservatives
- Ideology: Fiscal conservatism Economic liberalism
- National affiliation: Conservative & Liberal Unionists

The Municipal Reform Party was a local party allied to the parliamentary Conservative Party in the County of London. The party contested elections to both the London County Council and metropolitan borough councils of the county from 1906 to 1945.

== Formation ==
The party was formed in 1906 in order to overturn Progressive and Labour control of much of London municipal government. Before 1906 the Conservatives stood as Moderates. A central Municipal Reform Committee was formed in September 1906, and the new organisation absorbed the Moderate Party, who formed the opposition to the Progressives on the county council, as well as groups on the borough councils that opposed what they termed the "Progressive-Socialist Party". The new party was actively supported by the London Municipal Society whose aim was "maintaining and promoting the effective and economical working of the existing system of London Government." The Society campaigned on behalf of Municipal Reform candidates, who it was hoped would reduce municipal debt and "overcome the increasing advance of Socialism under Progressive auspices".

== Metropolitan borough councils ==
The first elections for which the Municipal Reform Party stood were those to Metropolitan Borough councils, on 1 November 1906. The campaign was very successful, with Municipal Reformers winning control of twenty-two of twenty-eight councils. Of the remaining six councils, three had majorities of Municipal Reform-backed ratepayers or independents. Progressives held only three of twelve boroughs they previously controlled, while the Labour party lost its only borough, Woolwich, to the new party.

1906 was to prove a high point for Municipal Reform in the boroughs. They lost some ground in 1909 and 1912, but in 1919 they suffered major reverses at the hands of a resurgent Labour Party. Labour and Municipal Reform each had control of 11 boroughs after the election, although Municipal Reformers were able to have a share of power in the remaining boroughs by forming anti-Labour alliances with the remnants of the Progressive organisation. This anti-Labour strategy led to them returning to power in a number of boroughs at the next election in 1922 and by 1931 they controlled 18 boroughs, with six others controlled by allied parties or coalitions. From that point on the party's vote and share of seats declined at each election. The last election contested by the Municipal Reform Party was in 1945, when they held six boroughs. At the following election in 1949, official Conservative Party candidates stood for the first time.

== London County Council ==
Following their success in the 1906 borough elections, the Municipal Reform Party published a manifesto for the 1907 London County Council election. The party's policies included: tight controls on financial expenditure, proper auditing of municipal accounts, creation of a traffic board to co-ordinate transport in the capital, abandonment of the Progressive Party's plan to supply electricity in favour of provision by private enterprise and an education policy favouring denominational schools.

The election was held on 2 March 1907, and the party's campaign was highly successful, with Municipal Reformers taking power from the Progressives. The party was to hold power until 1934 when the Labour Party under Herbert Morrison gained control.

From 1934 to 1946 the Municipal Reform Party formed the opposition on the county council. The party effectively ceased to exist in 1946, when no Municipal Reform Party candidates were nominated for the county council election, and Conservative candidates appeared in their place for the first time.

== Leaders on London County Council ==
1907: Richard Robinson
1908: William Peel
1910: Hayes Fisher
1911: Cyril Jackson
1915: Ronald Collet Norman
1917: George Hume
1925: William Ray
1934: Harold Webbe

== Members of the Party ==
- Frank Goldsmith, representative for South St. Pancras (1904–1910) and whip of the party.
- Sir Henry Percy Harris, chairman of the London County Council 1907–08, then MP for Paddington South 1910–1922.
- Cecil Levita, chairman of the London County Council 1928–29.
- Ronald Collet Norman, chairman of the London County Council 1918–19.
- Richard Robinson, leader of the London County Council 1907–08.
- Sir Robert Tasker
- Harold Webbe, leader of the party for 12 years.
