= Progressive Party (London) =

Political party in the United Kingdom

The Progressive Party was a political party aligned to the Liberal Party that contested municipal elections in the United Kingdom.

== History ==
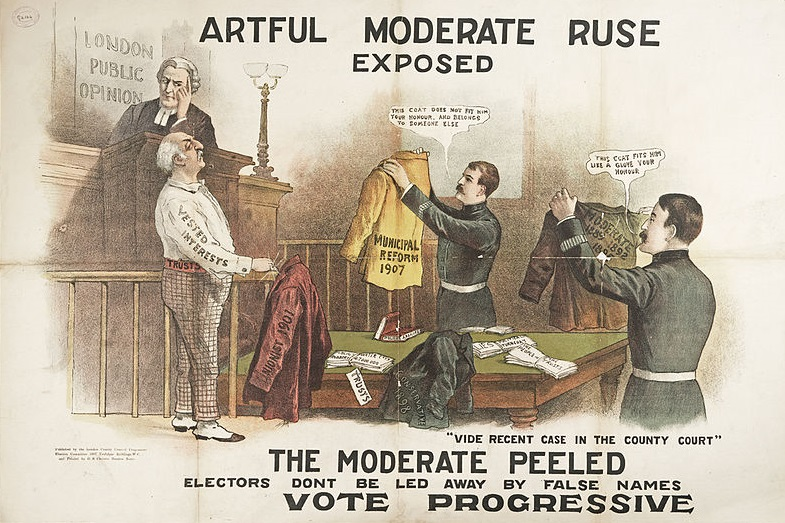
Progressive election poster, 1907

It was founded in 1888 by a group of Liberals and leaders of the labour movement. It was also supported by the Fabian Society, and Sidney Webb was one of its councillors. In the first elections of the London County Council (LCC) in January 1889 the Progressive Party won 70 of the 118 seats. It lost power in 1907 to the Municipal Reform Party (a Conservative organisation) under Richard Robinson.

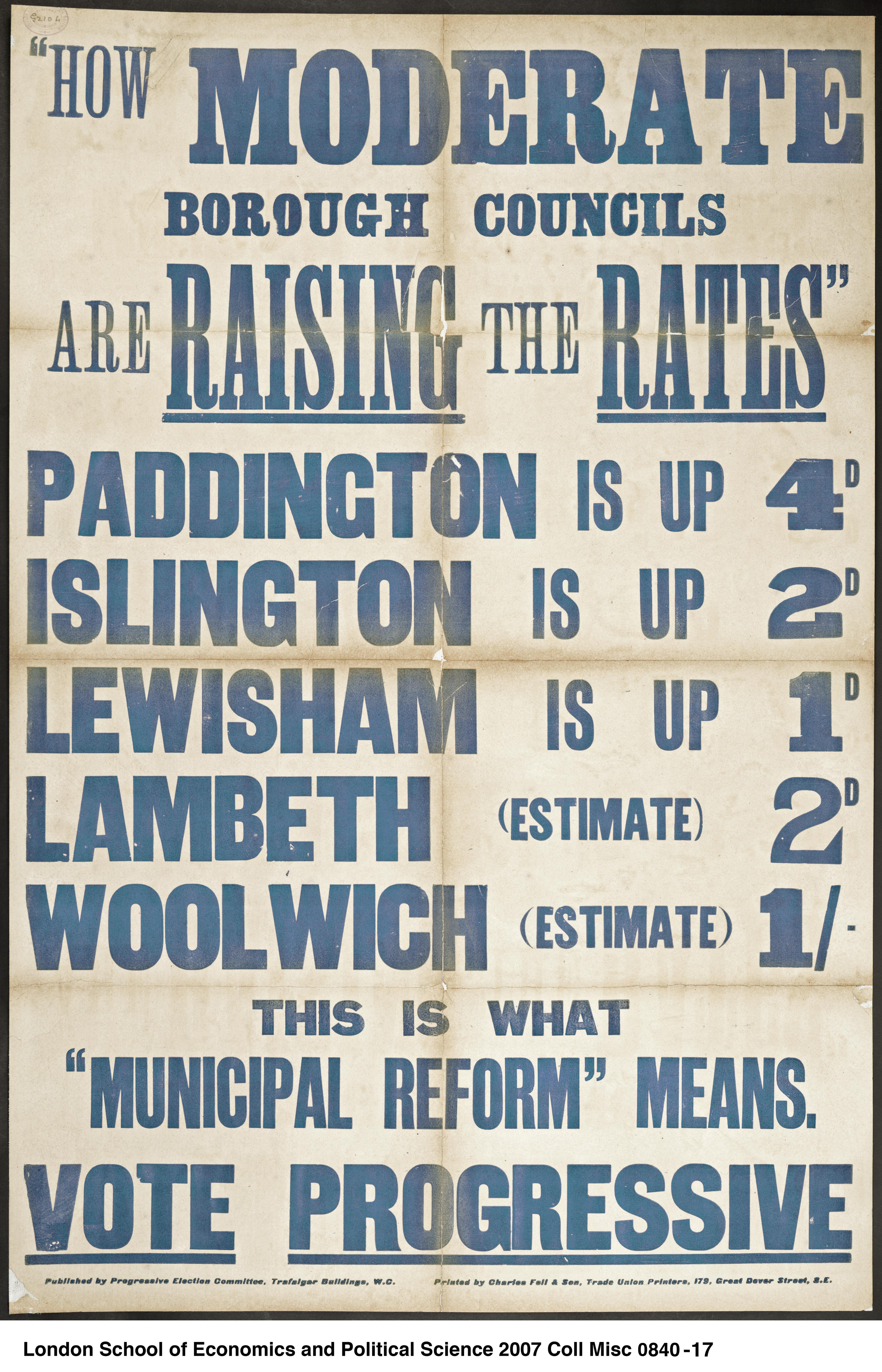
Progressive Party poster protesting against high rates

== Leaders ==
1889: Thomas Farrer
1890: James Stuart
1892: Charles Harrison
1898: Thomas McKinnon Wood
1908: John Benn
1918: John Scott Lidgett

== Members ==
- Henrietta Adler
- Arthur Acland Allen
- Joseph Allen Baker
- Sir John Benn
- Frank Briant
- Charles Roden Buxton
- William Augustus Casson
- Henry Chancellor
- James William Cleland
- Ben Cooper
- George Cooper
- Sir Edwin Cornwall
- Sir Evan Cotton
- Rosamond Davenport Hill
- Willoughby Dickinson
- Garnham Edmonds
- Maurice de Forest
- Hugh Fullerton
- James Gilbert
- Harold Glanville
- Harry Gosling
- George Hardy
- Sir Percy Harris
- Stewart Headlam
- John Stanley Holmes
- Emslie Horniman
- Richard Lambert
- Hugh Lea
- John Scott Lidgett
- Edward Martell
- Charles McCurdy
- John McDougall
- Thomas McKinnon Wood
- Miriam Moses
- Oswald Partington, later Lord Doverdale
- Alfred Salter
- Alfred Henry Scott
- Edward Smallwood
- Evan Spicer
- Frederick Verney
- Graham Wallas
- David Waterlow
- Robert Williams
- Walter Baldwyn Yates
- Alfred William Yeo

== London Reform Union ==
In 1892 the London Reform Union was formed as the propaganda arm of the party.

== See also ==
- Category:Progressive Party (London) politicians
