= List of members of London County Council 1919–1937 =

This is a list of councillors and aldermen elected to the London County Council from 1919 to 1937.

== Councillors 1919–1928 ==
In 1919 triennial elections to the London County Council resumed. The elections due in 1916 had been postponed due to the First World War, and vacancies had been filled by co-option.

The size of the council was increased to 124 councillors and 20 aldermen from 1919. The councillors were elected for electoral divisions corresponding to the new parliamentary constituencies that had been created by the Representation of the People Act 1918. Seven women were elected in 1919.

Electoral division	Elected 6 March 1919	Party	Elected 2 March 1922	Party	Elected 5 March 1925	Party
City of London	Sir George Rowland Blades (resigned 11 November 1919) Geoffrey Head (elected unopposed 1 December 1919)	Municipal Reform	Geoffrey Head	Municipal Reform	Geoffrey Head	Municipal Reform
City of London	Major Percy Coleman Simmons	Municipal Reform	Major Sir Percy Coleman Simmons	Municipal Reform	Major Sir Percy Coleman Simmons	Municipal Reform
City of London	Sir Lulham Pound	Municipal Reform	Sir Lulham Pound	Municipal Reform	Sir Lulham Pound	Municipal Reform
City of London	Major William Wilson Grantham	Municipal Reform	Major William Wilson Grantham	Municipal Reform	Major William Wilson Grantham	Municipal Reform
Battersea North	Joseph George Butler	Labour	Joseph George Butler	Labour	Joseph George Butler	Labour
Battersea North	Alf Watts	Labour	Alf Watts	Labour	Caroline Selina Ganley	Labour
Battersea South	Edwin Evans (Politician)	Municipal Reform	Edwin Evans (Politician)	Municipal Reform	Charles James Allpass	Municipal Reform
Battersea South	William Hammond (died 10 June 1921) William Hall (elected 28 June 1921)	Municipal Reform	William Hall	Municipal Reform	Harry Ralph Selley	Municipal Reform
Bermondsey Rotherhithe	John Scott Lidgett	Progressive	Alan Randle	Labour	Alan Randle	Labour
Bermondsey Rotherhithe	Robert Leishman Stuart	Progressive	William John Webb	Labour	William John Webb	Labour
Bermondsey West	Harold Glanville	Progressive	Eveline Lowe	Labour	Eveline Lowe	Labour
Bermondsey West	Montague Shearman	Progressive	Frederick Charles Langton	Labour	Benjamin Thomas Embleton	Labour
Bethnal Green North East	Sir Edward Smith	Progressive	Sir Edgar Bonham-Carter	Progressive	H T Macdonald	Labour
Bethnal Green North East	Garnham Edmonds	Progressive	William Shadforth	Progressive	George Belt	Labour
Bethnal Green South West	Rev. Stewart Headlam	Progressive	Rev. Stewart Headlam	Progressive	Ronald Potter Jones	Progressive
Bethnal Green South West	Percy Alfred Harris	Progressive	Percy Alfred Harris	Progressive	Percy Alfred Harris	Progressive
Camberwell Dulwich	Henry Cubitt Gooch	Municipal Reform	Henry Cubitt Gooch	Municipal Reform	Henry Cubitt Gooch	Municipal Reform
Camberwell Dulwich	Colonel Francis Edward Fremantle	Municipal Reform	Captain George Sitwell Campbell Swinton	Municipal Reform	Captain George Sitwell Campbell Swinton	Municipal Reform
Camberwell North	Charles George Ammon MP	Labour	Charles George Ammon MP	Labour	Agnes Dawson	Labour
Camberwell North	Herbert Arthur Baker	Progressive	Cecil Aubrey Gwynne Manning	Labour	Cecil Aubrey Gwynne Manning	Labour
Camberwell North-West	Henry Ernest Wood	Progressive	Captain C D Kingston	Municipal Reform	William Harold Webbe	Municipal Reform
Camberwell North-West	Seth Coward	Progressive	William Jackson Morton	Municipal Reform	William Jackson Morton	Municipal Reform
Camberwell Peckham	Thomas Gautrey	Progressive	Thomas Gautrey	Progressive	Ruth Dalton	Labour
Camberwell Peckham	Lord Haddo	Progressive	Lord Haddo	Progressive	Jack Percy Blake	Labour
Chelsea	Ernest Louis Meinertzhagen	Municipal Reform	Ernest Louis Meinertzhagen	Municipal Reform	Ernest Louis Meinertzhagen	Municipal Reform
Chelsea	Ronald Collet Norman	Municipal Reform	William Sidney	Municipal Reform	The Hon. William Sidney	Municipal Reform
Deptford	Margaret McMillan	Labour	Captain Guy Herbert Walmisley, MC	Municipal Reform	James Mahoney	Labour
Deptford	John Speakman	Labour	Marshall James Pike	Municipal Reform	John Speakman	Labour
Finsbury	George Masterman Gillet	Progressive	Otho William Nicholson	Municipal Reform	Rear Admiral Ernest Augustus Taylor	Municipal Reform
Finsbury	Alfred Baker	Progressive	Rachel M Parsons	Municipal Reform	James Alexander Lawson Duncan	Municipal Reform
Fulham East	Lieutenant-General Sir Francis Lloyd	Municipal Reform	Frank Holmes	Municipal Reform	Frank Holmes	Municipal Reform
Fulham East	Beatrix Margaret Lyall	Municipal Reform	Beatrix Margaret Lyall	Municipal Reform	Dame Beatrix Margaret Lyall	Municipal Reform
Fulham West	Sir Cyril S Cobb MP	Municipal Reform	Sir Cyril S Cobb MP	Municipal Reform	Sir Cyril S Cobb MP	Municipal Reform
Fulham West	Brigadier-General William Ward Warner	Municipal Reform	Frank W Hobbs	Municipal Reform	Captain Frank W Hobbs	Municipal Reform
Greenwich	George Hopwood Hume	Municipal Reform	George Rowland Hill	Municipal Reform	J Madeline Hill	Municipal Reform
Greenwich	Ernest Dence	Municipal Reform	Ernest Dence	Municipal Reform	Ernest Dence	Municipal Reform
Hackney Central	Henrietta Adler	Progressive	Henrietta Adler	Progressive	Humfrey Henry Edmunds	Municipal Reform
Hackney Central	Sergeant William Ray	Municipal Reform	William Ray	Municipal Reform	William Ray	Municipal Reform
Hackney North	Lady Trustram Eve	Municipal Reform	Lady Trustram Eve	Municipal Reform	Evelyn Emmet	Municipal Reform
Hackney North	Captain Oscar Emanuel Warburg	Municipal Reform	Captain Oscar Emanuel Warburg	Municipal Reform	Captain Oscar Emanuel Warburg	Municipal Reform
Hackney South	Theodore Chapman	Progressive	Theodore Chapman	Progressive	Ada Salter	Labour
Hackney South	J J McClelland	Progressive	H O Grant	Progressive	Alfred Baker	Labour
Hammersmith North	Frank Mayle	Municipal Reform	Lord Decies	Municipal Reform	Marshall Hays	Municipal Reform
Hammersmith North	David Cawdron	Municipal Reform	David Cawdron	Municipal Reform	Priscilla Worsthorne	Municipal Reform
Hammersmith South	Francis Robert Ince Anderton	Municipal Reform	Francis Robert Ince Anderton	Municipal Reform	John Crawford Platt	Municipal Reform
Hammersmith South	Major Isidore Salmon	Municipal Reform	Major Isidore Salmon	Moderate	Bertie Jonathan Samels	Municipal Reform
Hampstead	Andrew Thomas Taylor	Municipal Reform	Andrew Thomas Taylor	Municipal Reform	Andrew Thomas Taylor (resigned 6 February 1926) Frank Geere Howard (elected unopposed 4 March 1926)	Municipal Reform
Hampstead	Walter Reynolds	Municipal Reform	Walter Reynolds	Municipal Reform	Walter Reynolds	Municipal Reform
Holborn	Henry Hugh Tasker	Municipal Reform	Major Robert Inigo Tasker	Municipal Reform	Major Robert Inigo Tasker MP	Municipal Reform
Holborn	Lord Eustace Percy	Municipal Reform	George Harvey	Municipal Reform	Bracewell Smith	Municipal Reform
Islington East	William Lace Clague	Progressive	William Lace Clague	Progressive	Captain Edward Charles Cobb, DSO	Municipal Reform
Islington East	Jack Percy Blake	Progressive	Jack Percy Blake	Progressive	Thelma Cazalet	Municipal Reform
Islington North	Frederick Lionel Dove	Municipal Reform	Frederick Lionel Dove	Municipal Reform	Frederick Lionel Dove	Municipal Reform
Islington North	Robert McKenna	Labour	Rosamund Smith	Municipal Reform	Rosamund Smith	Municipal Reform
Islington South	George Dew	Progressive	George Dew	Progressive	Tom Forrest Howard	Municipal Reform
Islington South	Howell Jones Williams	Progressive	Sir Howell Jones Williams	Progressive	William Thoresby Cooksey	Municipal Reform
Islington West	Henry Mills	Progressive	Henry Mills	Progressive	Henry Mills	Progressive
Islington West	James Skinner	Progressive	Frank Walter Raffety	Progressive	Sidney Charles Harper	Municipal Reform
Kensington North	David Davis	Municipal Reform	David Davis	Municipal Reform	David Davis	Municipal Reform
Kensington North	Lieutenant-Colonel Cecil Bingham Levita	Municipal Reform	Lieutenant-Colonel Cecil Bingham Levita	Municipal Reform	Lieutenant-Colonel Cecil Bingham Levita	Municipal Reform
Kensington South	Major General William Frederick Cavaye	Municipal Reform	Major General William Frederick Cavaye	Municipal Reform	Lady Trustram Eve	Municipal Reform
Kensington South	Henry Vincent Rowe	Municipal Reform	Henry Vincent Rowe	Municipal Reform	Henry Vincent Rowe (died 17 June 1927) Frederick E Williams (elected unopposed 14 July 1927)	Municipal Reform
Lambeth Brixton	Sir Charles Henry Gibbs	Municipal Reform	Gervas Evelyn Pierrepont	Municipal Reform	Captain Gervas Evelyn Pierrepont MC	Municipal Reform
Lambeth Brixton	Major Ernest Gray MP	Municipal Reform	Ernest Gray MP	Municipal Reform	Nigel Claudian Dalziel Colman	Municipal Reform
Lambeth Kennington	Sir John Williams Benn	Progressive	Sir John Williams Benn (died 10 April 1922)	Progressive	George Maurice Beaufoy	Municipal Reform
Lambeth Kennington	Sir John Williams Benn	Progressive	Harry Gosling (elected 29 April 1922)	Labour	George Maurice Beaufoy	Municipal Reform
Lambeth Kennington	Harry Gosling	Labour	Harold Swann	Municipal Reform	Harold Swann	Municipal Reform
Lambeth North	Thomas Owen Jacobsen	Progressive	R C E Powell	Labour	R C E Powell	Labour
Lambeth North	Rose Lamartine Yates	Independent	Reginald Myer	Progressive	George Russell Strauss	Labour
Lambeth Norwood	Cecil Urquhart Fisher	Municipal Reform	Rose Dunn-Gardner	Municipal Reform	Rose Dunn-Gardner	Municipal Reform
Lambeth Norwood	Forbes St John Morrow	Municipal Reform	William Francis Marchant	Municipal Reform	Captain William Francis Marchant	Municipal Reform
Lewisham East	Major Eric Ball	Municipal Reform	Lieutenant-Colonel Eric Ball	Municipal Reform	John Littlejohns	Municipal Reform
Lewisham East	Richard Owen Roberts	Municipal Reform	Richard Owen Roberts	Municipal Reform	Major Walter Waring	Municipal Reform
Lewisham West	Major Philip Dawson	Municipal Reform	Edward Taswell Campbell	Municipal Reform	E G Sawyer (resigned 29 September 1926) Frederick Leigh-Pollitt (elected unopposed 28 October 1926)	Municipal Reform
Lewisham West	Robert Jackson	Municipal Reform	Percival Harry Reed	Municipal Reform	Percival Harry Reed	Municipal Reform
Paddington North	Herbert Lidiard	Moderate	Thomas Clarence Edward Goff	Moderate	Major Thomas Clarence Edward Goff	Moderate
Paddington North	John Herbert Hunter	Municipal Reform	John Herbert Hunter	Municipal Reform	John Herbert Hunter; Knighted as Sir Herbert Hunter, June 1925	Municipal Reform
Paddington South	Lieutenant-Colonel John Burgess-Preston Karslake	Municipal Reform	Lieutenant-Colonel John Burgess-Preston Karslake	Municipal Reform	Lieutenant-Colonel John Burgess-Preston Karslake	Municipal Reform
Paddington South	Major Harry Barned Lewis-Barned	Municipal Reform	Major Harry Barned Lewis-Barned	Municipal Reform	Major Harry Barned Lewis-Barned	Municipal Reform
Poplar, Bow and Bromley	Charlie Sumner	Labour	Charlie Sumner	Labour	Charlie Sumner (died 8 December 1925) Thomas John Blacketer (elected unopposed 11 January 1926)	Labour
Poplar, Bow and Bromley	Edward Cruse	Labour	Edward Cruse	Labour	Edward Cruse	Labour
Poplar South	Samuel March	Labour	Samuel March	Labour	George William Mills	Labour
Poplar South	Susan Lawrence	Labour	Susan Lawrence	Labour	Susan Lawrence	Labour
St Marylebone	Lieutenant-Colonel Eustace Widdrington Morrison-Bell	Municipal Reform	Dr Adeline Roberts	Municipal Reform	Dr Adeline Roberts	Municipal Reform
St Marylebone	Ernest Sanger	Municipal Reform	Ernest Sanger	Municipal Reform	Ernest Sanger	Municipal Reform
St Pancras North	William Lloyd-Taylor	Progressive	Captain Ian Fraser	Municipal Reform	Alexander Muir Shand	Municipal Reform
St Pancras North	John Hunter Harley	Progressive	(Constance) Alice Elliot	Municipal Reform	(Constance) Alice Elliot	Municipal Reform
St Pancras South East	David Davies	Municipal Reform	David Davies ¶	Municipal Reform	David Davies	Municipal Reform
St Pancras South East	Mrs E J Hopkins	Municipal Reform	Mrs E J Hopkins	Municipal Reform	Mrs E J Hopkins	Municipal Reform
St Pancras South West	Lieutenant-Colonel Auberon Claud Hegan Kennard	Municipal Reform	Lieutenant-Colonel Auberon Claud Hegan Kennard	Municipal Reform	Adrian Charles Moreing	Municipal Reform
St Pancras South West	Charles William Matthews	Municipal Reform	Charles William Matthews ¶	Municipal Reform	Charles William Matthews	Municipal Reform
Shoreditch	Henry Ward	Progressive	Henry Ward	Progressive	Thomas John Sillitoe	Labour
Shoreditch	Charles E. Taylor	Labour	Frank Stanley Henwood	Progressive	Alfred Walton	Labour
Southwark Central	James Daniel Gilbert MP	Progressive	James Daniel Gilbert MP	Progressive	James Daniel Gilbert	Progressive
Southwark Central	George Henry Cook	Progressive	George Henry Cook	Progressive	George Henry Cook	Progressive
Southwark North	Consuelo, Duchess of Marlborough (resigned 27 April 1920) J O Devereux (elected 13 May 1920)	Progressive	J O Devereux	Progressive	J O Devereux	Progressive Ratepayers
Southwark North	Walter J Wightman	Progressive	Frank Percy Rider	Municipal Reform	T E Gibbings	Labour
Southwark South East	Rev. John C. Morris	Progressive	John Osborn	Progressive	Dr Stella Churchill	Labour
Southwark South East	W J Pincombe	Progressive	W J Pincombe	Progressive	Lewis Silkin	Labour
Stepney, Limehouse	Henry Marks	Progressive	Henry Marks	Progressive	I Lyons	Labour
Stepney, Limehouse	Robert M Bryan	Labour	Mrs C B Lankester	Municipal Reform	Anna Mathew	Labour
Stepney, Mile End	Captain Alfred Ordway Goodrich	Municipal Reform	Captain John Cecil Gerard Leigh	Municipal Reform	Julia Scurr (resigned 17 February 1926)	Labour
Stepney, Mile End	Captain Alfred Ordway Goodrich	Municipal Reform	Captain John Cecil Gerard Leigh	Municipal Reform	John Bigelow Dodge (elected 15 March 1926)	Anti-Socialist (joined Municipal Reform Party on taking seat)
Stepney, Mile End	D Hazel	Municipal Reform	Captain Offley Wakeman	Municipal Reform	Hugh Roberts	Labour
Stepney, Whitechapel and St George's	Henry Herman Gordon	Progressive	Christopher John Kelly	Labour	Christopher John Kelly	Labour
Stepney, Whitechapel and St George's	William C. Johnson	Progressive	William C. Johnson	Progressive	Morry Davis	Labour
Stoke Newington	Edward Holton Coumbe	Municipal Reform	Major Edward Holton Coumbe	Municipal Reform	Major Edward Holton Coumbe	Municipal Reform
Stoke Newington	W H Key	Municipal Reform	Archibald Albert McDonald Gordon	Municipal Reform	Archibald Albert McDonald Gordon	Municipal Reform
Wandsworth, Balham and Tooting	Rev. Bevill Allen	Progressive	John Ernest Perring	Municipal Reform	John Ernest Perring	Municipal Reform
Wandsworth, Balham and Tooting	Rev. Henry Herman Carlisle	Progressive	Malcolm Campbell-Johnston	Municipal Reform	Malcolm Campbell-Johnston	Municipal Reform
Wandsworth, Central	Major Viscount Bury	Municipal Reform	Charles Paston Crane	Municipal Reform	Clyde Wilson	Municipal Reform
Wandsworth, Central	Robert G Taylor	Municipal Reform	Robert G Taylor	Municipal Reform	Robert G Taylor	Municipal Reform
Wandsworth, Clapham	Herbert Francis Golds (died 9 April 1921) Cyril Henry Montague Jacobs (elected 2 May 1921)	Municipal Reform	Cyril Henry Montague Jacobs	Municipal Reform	Cyril Henry Montague Jacobs	Municipal Reform
Wandsworth, Clapham	Sir George Bettesworth Piggott	Municipal Reform	Lord Monk Bretton	Municipal Reform	Lord Monk Bretton	Municipal Reform
Wandsworth, Putney	C T Dickins	Municipal Reform	William Hunt	Municipal Reform	William Hunt	Municipal Reform
Wandsworth, Putney	Lieutenant-Commander Alfred Cooper Rawson	Municipal Reform	Angus Newton Scott	Municipal Reform	Angus Newton Scott	Municipal Reform
Wandsworth, Streatham	Sir Arthur Cornelius Roberts	Municipal Reform	Sir Arthur Roberts	Municipal Reform	J Elliott Mark	Municipal Reform
Wandsworth, Streatham	A Clifford Thomas (resigned 26 April 1921) Captain Frederic Bertram Galer (elected unopposed 9 May 1921)	Municipal Reform	Captain Frederic Bertram Galer	Municipal Reform	Captain Frederic Bertram Galer	Municipal Reform
Westminster, Abbey	John Maria Gatti	Municipal Reform	John Maria Gatti	Municipal Reform	John Maria Gatti	Municipal Reform
Westminster, Abbey	Reginald White Granville-Smith	Municipal Reform	Reginald White Granville-Smith	Municipal Reform	Captain James Cornelius Dalton	Municipal Reform
Westminster, St George's	Brigadier-General Richard Joshua Cooper	Municipal Reform	Brigadier-General Richard Joshua Cooper	Municipal Reform	Lord Falmouth	Municipal Reform
Westminster, St George's	Hubert John Greenwood	Municipal Reform	Hubert John Greenwood	Municipal Reform	Hubert John Greenwood	Municipal Reform
Woolwich, East	Captain Leslie Haden-Guest, MC	Labour	Herbert Morrison	Labour	Herbert Morrison	Labour
Woolwich, East	Henry Snell	Labour	Henry Snell	Labour	William Harold Hutchinson	Labour
Woolwich, West	William James Squires	Municipal Reform	Sidney Herbert Cuff	Municipal Reform	Frederick Thomas Halse	Municipal Reform
Woolwich, West	Lieutenant-Colonel Percy Reginald Simner DSO	Municipal Reform	Ernest Henry Kemp	Municipal Reform	Ernest Henry Kemp	Municipal Reform

¶ Previously an alderman.

== County aldermen 1919–1934 ==
In addition to the 124 councillors the council consisted of 20 county aldermen. Aldermen were elected by the council, and served a six-year term. Half of the aldermanic bench (nine or ten aldermen) were elected every three years following the triennial council election.

Term	Alderman	Party
1919 - 1925	Captain Louis Courtauld (died 1922)	Municipal Reform
1919 - 1925, 1925 - 1931	John William Gilbert (knighted 1922)	Municipal Reform
1919 - 1925	Bernard Henry Holland	Municipal Reform
1919 - 1925	Sir Cyril Jackson	Municipal Reform
1919 - 1925	Howard Willmott Liversidge	Municipal Reform
1919 - 1925, 1925 - 1931	Lady St Helier	Municipal Reform
1919 - 1923	Charles James Mathew (died January 1923)	Progressive
1919 - 1925	Henry Evan Auguste Cotton	Progressive
1919 - 1925	Henry de Rosenbach Walker	Progressive
1919 - 1925, 1928 - 1934	Katherine Wallas	Progressive
1919 - 1922, 1922 - 1928, 1928 - 1934	Albert Emil Davies	Labour
1922 - 1928	John Jacob Astor	Municipal Reform
1922 - 1928	Alfred Ordway Goodrich	Municipal Reform
1922 - 1928, 1928 - 1934	George Hopwood Hume (knighted 1924)	Municipal Reform
1922 - 1928	Dr Florence Barrie Lambert	Municipal Reform
1922 - 1928, 1928 - 1934	Ronald Collet Norman	Municipal Reform
1922 - 1928	Jessie Wilton Phipps (Dame from 1926)	Municipal Reform
1922 - 1928	Sir Harry Lushington Stephen	Municipal Reform
1922 - 1928	Herbert Arthur Baker	Progressive
1922 - 1928	Dr John Scott Lidgett	Progressive
1922 - 1925	George Masterman Gillett (in place of Courtald) (resigned 11 March 1924)	Labour
1924 - 1925	Alfred Baker (in place of Gillett) (18 March 1924)	Labour
1925 - 1931	Sir Francis Robert Ince Anderton	Municipal Reform
1925 - 1931	Lord Haddo	Municipal Reform
1925 - 1931	Mrs C B Lankester	Municipal Reform
1925 - 1931	Guy Herbert Walmisley	Municipal Reform
1925 - 1931	Richard Coppock	Labour
1925 - 1931	Ewart Gladstone Culpin	Labour
1925 - 1931	John Scurr MP	Labour
1925 - 1931	William C Johnson	Progressive
1928 - 1934	David Davies	Municipal Reform
1928 - 1934	Lord Cranbrook	Municipal Reform
1928 - 1934	George Maurice Beaufoy	Municipal Reform
1928 - 1934	Charles William Matthews	Municipal Reform
1928 - 1934	Charles Latham	Labour
1928 - 1934	Esther Rickards	Labour

== Party strength 1919–1928 ==
The strength of the parties on the council after each election was as follows:

Party	Councillors 1919	Aldermen 1919	Total 1919	Councillors 1922	Aldermen 1922	Total 1922	Councillors 1925	Aldermen 1925	Total 1925
Municipal Reform	68	12	80	82	12	94	83	13	96
Progressive	40	6	46	26	5	31	6	3	9
Labour	15	2	17	16	3	19	35	4	39
Independents	1	0	1	0	0	0	0	0	0

== Councillors 1928–1937 ==
Electoral division	Elected 8 March 1928		Elected 5 March 1931		Elected 8 March 1934	
Electoral division	Name	Party	Name	Party	Name	Party
City of London	Geoffrey Head	Municipal Reform	Geoffrey Head	Municipal Reform	Sir Angus Newton Scott‡	Municipal Reform
City of London	Sir Percy Simmons	Municipal Reform	Sir Percy Simmons	Municipal Reform	Sir Percy Simmons	Municipal Reform
City of London	Josiah Gunton (died 5 March 1930) William Phené Neal (elected unopposed 4 April 1930)	Municipal Reform	Alderman Sir Louis A Newton	Municipal Reform	Sir Frank Bowater	Municipal Reform
City of London	Major William Wilson Grantham	Municipal Reform	Major William Wilson Grantham	Municipal Reform	William Wilson Grantham K C	Municipal Reform
Battersea North	Lt. Col. Morris Boscawen Savage	Municipal Reform	A Vincent Clarke	Municipal Reform	F C R Douglas	Labour
Battersea North	Edgar John Sainsbury	Municipal Reform	Edgar John Sainsbury	Municipal Reform	Caroline Selina Ganley	Labour
Battersea South	Charles James Allpass	Municipal Reform	Charles James Allpass	Municipal Reform	Charles James Allpass	Municipal Reform
Battersea South	Harry Ralph Selley	Municipal Reform	Harry Ralph Selley	Municipal Reform	Harry Ralph Selley MP	Municipal Reform
Bermondsey Rotherhithe	I J Hayward	Labour	I J Hayward	Labour	I J Hayward	Labour
Bermondsey Rotherhithe	Sidney Stranks	Labour	Sidney Stranks	Labour	James Allan Gillison	Labour
Bermondsey West	Evelyn Mary Lowe	Labour	Evelyn Mary Lowe	Labour	Evelyn Mary Lowe	Labour
Bermondsey West	Ada Salter‡	Labour	Ada Salter	Labour	Ada Salter	Labour
Bethnal Green North East	Richard Edward Pearson	Liberal	Richard Edward Pearson	Liberal	Rachel Susanna Keeling	Labour
Bethnal Green North East	Eleanor Joan Clara Nathan	Liberal	Eleanor Joan Clara Nathan	Liberal	Thomas Dawson	Labour
Bethnal Green South West	Ronald Potter Jones	Liberal	Ronald Potter Jones	Liberal	J E A King	Labour
Bethnal Green South West	Percy Alfred Harris	Liberal	Percy Alfred Harris	Liberal	Reginald Stamp	Labour
Camberwell Dulwich	Henry Cubitt Gooch	Municipal Reform	Sir Henry Cubitt Gooch	Municipal Reform	Frederick Charles Eaton	Municipal Reform
Camberwell Dulwich	Henry Alfred Wilmot	Municipal Reform	Henry Alfred Wilmot (died 21 December 1933: seat remained vacant)	Municipal Reform	William Hall Hickin	Municipal Reform
Camberwell North	Agnes Dawson	Labour	Agnes Dawson	Labour	Agnes Dawson	Labour
Camberwell North	Cecil Manning	Labour	Cecil Manning (resigned 1 July 1932); Thomas Williams(elected at byelection 16 July 1932)	Labour	Thomas Williams	Labour
Camberwell North-West	William Harold Webbe	Municipal Reform	William Harold Webbe	Municipal Reform	James Kaylor	Labour
Camberwell North-West	William Jackson Morton	Municipal Reform	William Jackson Morton	Municipal Reform	Freda Künzlen Corbet	Labour
Camberwell Peckham	Ruth Dalton	Labour	W J Jennings	Municipal Reform	Richard Sargood	Labour
Camberwell Peckham	Jack Percy Blake	Labour	Arthur Leonard Bateman	Municipal Reform	Francis William Bowie	Labour
Chelsea	Ernest Louis Meinertzhagen	Municipal Reform	Sir Ernest Louis Meinertzhagen (died 6 January 1933) Basil Futvoye Marsden-Smedley (elected unopposed 23 February 1933)	Municipal Reform	Basil Futvoye Marsden-Smedley	Municipal Reform
Chelsea	The Hon. William Sidney	Municipal Reform	Hon. William Sidney	Municipal Reform	Catherine Fulford	Municipal Reform
Deptford	James Mahoney	Labour	James Mahoney	Labour	James Mahoney	Labour
Deptford	John Speakman	Labour	John Speakman	Labour	John Speakman	Labour
Finsbury	William Harry Martin	Labour	William Harry Martin	Labour	William Harry Martin	Labour
Finsbury	Charles Robert Simpson	Labour	Charles Robert Simpson	Labour	G E Hayes	Labour
Fulham East	Bertram Mills	Municipal Reform	Bertram Mills	Municipal Reform	Paul Williams	Labour
Fulham East	Dame Beatrix Lyall	Municipal Reform	Dame Beatrix Lyall	Municipal Reform	Maj. Harry Barnes (died 12 October 1935)	Labour
Fulham East	Dame Beatrix Lyall	Municipal Reform	Dame Beatrix Lyall	Municipal Reform	Dame Beatrix Lyall (elected at byelection 10 December 1935)	Municipal Reform
Fulham West	Sir Cyril Cobb MP	Municipal Reform	Sir Cyril Cobb MP	Municipal Reform	Christopher Lancaster	Labour
Fulham West	Frank Washington Hobbs	Municipal Reform	Earl of Haddo	Municipal Reform	Leah L'Estrange Malone	Labour
Greenwich	Cuthbert Edward Hunter	Municipal Reform	Cuthbert Edward Hunter	Municipal Reform	Esther Rickards¶	Labour
Greenwich	Ernest Dence	Municipal Reform	Ernest Dence	Municipal Reform	Walter Windsor	Labour
Hackney Central	Henrietta Adler	Liberal	Montague Moustardier	Municipal Reform	Bernard Homa	Labour
Hackney Central	William Ray	Municipal Reform	William Ray	Municipal Reform	Mary O'Brien Harris	Labour
Hackney North	Oscar Emanuel Warburg	Municipal Reform	Robert Spencer	Municipal Reform	Henry Edwin Goodrich	Labour
Hackney North	Evelyn Emmet	Municipal Reform	Evelyn Emmet	Municipal Reform	Molly Bolton	Labour
Hackney South	Alfred Baker	Labour	Alfred Baker	Labour	Alfred Baker	Labour
Hackney South	Marshall Jackman	Labour	Marshall Jackman	Labour	Charles Latham¶	Labour
Hammersmith North	Sir Marshall Hays	Municipal Reform	Lindsay Richard Venn	Municipal Reform	Hubert L Foden-Pattinson	Labour
Hammersmith North	Francis William Bowie	Labour	Moyra Goff	Municipal Reform	Thomas Henry Jones	Labour
Hammersmith South	John Crawford Platt	Municipal Reform	Walter Clifford Northcott	Municipal Reform	Walter Clifford Northcott	Municipal Reform
Hammersmith South	Bertie Jonathan Samels	Municipal Reform	Bertie Jonathan Samels	Municipal Reform	Bertie Jonathan Samels	Municipal Reform
Hampstead	Frank Geere Howard	Municipal Reform	Frank Geere Howard	Municipal Reform	Dr Sydney Monckton Copeman	Municipal Reform
Hampstead	Walter Reynolds	Municipal Reform	William Reed Hornby Steer	Municipal Reform	William Reed Hornby Steer	Municipal Reform
Holborn	Sir Robert Inigo Tasker	Municipal Reform	Sir Robert Inigo Tasker	Municipal Reform	Sir Robert Inigo Tasker	Municipal Reform
Holborn	W G Burns	Municipal Reform	Percy Hill	Municipal Reform	Percy Hill	Municipal Reform
Islington East	Edward Cobb	Municipal Reform	Edward Cobb	Municipal Reform	Norman Hulbert	Municipal Reform
Islington East	Thelma Cazalet	Municipal Reform	Charles Robertson	Labour	Guy Neumann	Municipal Reform
Islington North	Frederick Lionel Dove	Municipal Reform	Frederick Lionel Dove (died 11 June 1932) Sidney Charles Harper (elected at byelection 14 July 1932)	Municipal Reform	Sidney Charles Harper	Municipal Reform
Islington North	Rosamund Smith	Municipal Reform	Rosamund Smith	Municipal Reform	A C Knight	Municipal Reform
Islington South	Charles R Bennett	Labour	Tom Forrest Howard	Municipal Reform	Eric George Molyneux Fletcher	Labour
Islington South	George House	Labour	William Thoresby Cooksey	Municipal Reform	John Dugdale	Labour
Islington West	George Bryant Naish	Labour	George Bryant Naish	Labour	George Bryant Naish	Labour
Islington West	Rev. Arthur George Prichard	Labour	Rev. Arthur George Prichard	Labour	Rev. Arthur George Prichard	Labour
Kensington North	David Davis (died 11 April 1930); Patrick Buchan-Hepburn (elected unopposed 14 May 1930)	Municipal Reform	Dr Henry Robinson	Municipal Reform	Dr Henry Robinson	Municipal Reform
Kensington North	Lieutenant-Colonel Cecil Levita	Municipal Reform	Lieutenant-Colonel Cecil Levita	Municipal Reform	Lieutenant-Colonel Cecil Levita	Municipal Reform
Kensington South	Lady Trustram Eve	Municipal Reform	Alexander Henry Melvill Wedderburn	Municipal Reform	Robert Christmas Dewar Jenkins	Municipal Reform
Kensington South	Frederick E Williams (died 23 March 1929); Charlotte Keeling (elected at byelection 17 October 1929)	Municipal Reform	Charlotte Keeling	Municipal Reform	Charlotte Keeling (died 5 December 1935) Angela, Countess of Limerick (elected unopposed 30 January 1936)	Municipal Reform
Lambeth Brixton	Gervas Evelyn Pierrepont	Municipal Reform	Gervas Evelyn Pierrepont	Municipal Reform	Gervas Evelyn Pierrepont	Municipal Reform
Lambeth Brixton	Dr Florence Barrie Lambert	Municipal Reform	Charles Kingston	Municipal Reform	Barbara L Hornby	Municipal Reform
Lambeth Kennington	Charles William Gibson	Labour	Henry Gray Studholme	Municipal Reform	Charles William Gibson	Labour
Lambeth Kennington	Harold Swann	Municipal Reform	Harold Swann	Municipal Reform	Amy Sayle	Labour
Lambeth North	George Russell Strauss	Labour	Frank Briant	Liberal	Reginald C S Ellison	Labour
Lambeth North	Jennie Adamson	Labour	Miss Ida Samuel	Liberal	Ada Emily Gray	Labour
Lambeth Norwood	Rose Dunn-Gardner	Municipal Reform	Priscilla Worsthorne‡	Municipal Reform	Audrey Nona Gamble	Municipal Reform
Lambeth Norwood	William Francis Marchant	Municipal Reform	William Francis Marchant	Municipal Reform	William Francis Marchant	Municipal Reform
Lewisham East	Joseph Benskin	Municipal Reform	Joseph Benskin	Municipal Reform	Walter Richard Owen	Labour
Lewisham East	Herbert Paul Latham	Municipal Reform	Herbert Paul Latham	Municipal Reform	Amy L Crossman	Labour
Lewisham West	Frederick Leigh Pollitt	Municipal Reform	Frederick Leigh Pollitt	Municipal Reform	Frederick Leigh Leigh-Pollitt	Municipal Reform
Lewisham West	Percival Harry Reed	Municipal Reform	N Geoffrey Richards	Municipal Reform	N Geoffrey Richards	Municipal Reform
Paddington North	Thomas Clarence Edward Goff	Municipal Reform	Earl of Munster	Municipal Reform	Earl of Munster	Municipal Reform
Paddington North	Sir (John) Herbert Hunter (died 22 February 1930) Frank Stanley Henwood (elected at byelection 13 March 1930)	Municipal Reform	Frank Stanley Henwood	Municipal Reform	Frank Stanley Henwood	Municipal Reform
Paddington South	Lieutenant-Colonel John Burgess-Preston Karslake	Municipal Reform	Harold Vaughan Kenyon	Municipal Reform	Harold Vaughan Kenyon	Municipal Reform
Paddington South	Major Harry Barned Lewis-Barned (died 29 December 1929) John Temple Scriven (elected 6 February 1930)	Municipal Reform	John Temple Scriven	Municipal Reform	John Temple Scriven (died 18 November 1935); Henry Gray Studholme (elected unopposed 15 January 1936)	Municipal Reform
Poplar, Bow and Bromley	Thomas John Blacketer	Labour	Thomas John Blacketer	Labour	Mrs E M Lambert	Labour
Poplar, Bow and Bromley	Edward Cruse	Labour	Edward Cruse	Labour	Edward Cruse	Labour
Poplar South	George William Mills (resigned 19 March 1930) David Morgan Adams (elected unopposed 16 April 1930)	Labour	David Morgan Adams	Labour	David Morgan Adams MP	Labour
Poplar South	Ishbel MacDonald	Labour	Ishbel MacDonald	Labour	William Henry Guy	Labour
Poplar South	Ishbel MacDonald	Labour	Ishbel MacDonald	Independent Socialist (November 1931)	William Henry Guy	Labour
St Marylebone	Dr Adeline Roberts	Municipal Reform	Dr Adeline Roberts	Municipal Reform	Frederick William Dean	Municipal Reform
St Marylebone	Ernest Sanger	Municipal Reform	Ernest Sanger	Municipal Reform	Ernest Sanger (knighted 1936)	Municipal Reform
St Pancras North	Alexander Muir Shand	Municipal Reform	Sir Alfred Davies	Municipal Reform	Sir Alfred Davies	Municipal Reform
St Pancras North	(Constance) Alice Elliot	Municipal Reform	Lillian Cadman, Baroness Cadman	Municipal Reform	Sidney Bolsom	Municipal Reform
St Pancras South East	Maud Mary Dollar	Labour	Albert Clavering	Municipal Reform	Frank Lawrence Combes	Labour
St Pancras South East	Albert Samuels	Labour	Evan Evans	Municipal Reform	David C Webster	Labour
St Pancras South West	Adrian Moreing	Municipal Reform	Adrian Moreing	Municipal Reform	Albert Samuels‡	Labour
St Pancras South West	William Samuel Mercer	Municipal Reform	Maurice Matthews	Municipal Reform	Maurice Matthews	Municipal Reform
Shoreditch	Thomas John Sillitoe	Labour	Santo Jeger	Labour	Santo Jeger	Labour
Shoreditch	Alfred Walton	Labour	Henrietta Girling	Labour	Henrietta Girling	Labour
Southwark Central	Kathleen Day	Labour	Harry Day	Labour	Harry Day	Labour
Southwark Central	David Arlott	Labour	David Arlott	Labour	David Arlott	Labour
Southwark North	Thomas George Gibbings	Labour	Charles Brook	Labour	Charles Brook	Labour
Southwark North	James Hyndman MacDonnell	Labour	James Hyndman MacDonnell	Labour	James Hyndman MacDonnell	Labour
Southwark South East	Stella Churchill	Labour	Stella Churchill (resigned 17 June 1932) George Strauss (elected at by-election 2 July 1932)	Labour	George Strauss	Labour
Southwark South East	Lewis Silkin	Labour	Lewis Silkin	Labour	Lewis Silkin	Labour
Stepney, Limehouse	Malcolm John MacDonald	Labour	Henry James Lazarus	Labour	Richard Coppock	Labour
Stepney, Limehouse	Anna Mathew	Labour	Anna Mathew	Labour	Anna Mathew	Labour
Stepney, Mile End	Johnnie Dodge	Municipal Reform	John Scurr (died 10 July 1932) Somerville Hastings (elected at by-election 27 July 1932)	Labour	Somerville Hastings	Labour
Stepney, Mile End	Lionel Guest	Municipal Reform	Daniel Frankel	Labour	Daniel Frankel	Labour
Stepney, Whitechapel and St George's	Morry Davis	Labour	Morry Davis	Labour	Christopher John Kelly	Labour
Stepney, Whitechapel and St George's	Jack Sullivan	Labour	Jack Oldfield	Labour	Jack Oldfield	Labour
Stoke Newington	Edward Holton Coumbe	Municipal Reform	Edward Holton Coumbe	Municipal Reform	Edward Holton Coumbe	Municipal Reform
Stoke Newington	Archibald Albert McDonald Gordon	Municipal Reform	Archibald Albert McDonald Gordon	Municipal Reform	Archibald Albert McDonald Gordon	Municipal Reform
Wandsworth, Balham and Tooting	John Ernest Perring	Municipal Reform	John Ernest Perring (knighted 1934)	Municipal Reform	John Ernest Perring	Municipal Reform
Wandsworth, Balham and Tooting	Malcolm Campbell-Johnston	Municipal Reform	Malcolm Campbell-Johnston	Municipal Reform	George Doland	Municipal Reform
Wandsworth, Central	Clyde Tabor Wilson	Municipal Reform	Clyde Tabor Wilson	Municipal Reform	Clyde Tabor Wilson (resigned 29 May 1935)	Municipal Reform
Wandsworth, Central	Clyde Tabor Wilson	Municipal Reform	Clyde Tabor Wilson	Municipal Reform	George Welsh Currie (elected at by-election 27 June 1935)	Labour
Wandsworth, Central	Robert G Taylor	Municipal Reform	Edward P Martin	Municipal Reform	Edward P Martin	Municipal Reform
Wandsworth, Clapham	Cyril Henry Montague Jacobs	Municipal Reform	Cyril Henry Montague Jacobs	Municipal Reform	Cyril Henry Montague Jacobs (died 4 September 1934) Bertram Mills (elected at by-election 22 October 1934)	Municipal Reform
Wandsworth, Clapham	Lord Monk Bretton	Municipal Reform	Lord Monk Bretton	Municipal Reform	John Leigh	Municipal Reform
Wandsworth, Putney	William Hunt	Municipal Reform	Robert G Taylor‡	Municipal Reform	Robert G Taylor	Municipal Reform
Wandsworth, Putney	Angus Newton Scott	Municipal Reform	Angus Newton Scott	Municipal Reform	Lieutenant-Colonel Arthur T Bellamy	Municipal Reform
Wandsworth, Streatham	James Elliott Mark	Municipal Reform	James Elliott Mark	Municipal Reform	James Elliott Mark	Municipal Reform
Wandsworth, Streatham	Captain Frederic Bertram Galer	Municipal Reform	Captain Frederic Bertram Galer	Municipal Reform	Captain Frederic Bertram Galer	Municipal Reform
Westminster, Abbey	John Maria Gatti (died 14 September 1929) Samuel Gluckstein (elected at by-election 31 October 1929)	Municipal Reform	Samuel Gluckstein	Municipal Reform	Sir Samuel Gluckstein	Municipal Reform
Westminster, Abbey	Captain James Cornelius Dalton	Municipal Reform	Captain James Cornelius Dalton	Municipal Reform	Captain James Cornelius Dalton	Municipal Reform
Westminster, St George's	Lord Falmouth	Municipal Reform	Dr Florence Barrie Lambert	Municipal Reform	Dr Florence Barrie Lambert	Municipal Reform
Westminster, St George's	Hon. Lady Lawrence	Municipal Reform	John Theodore Cuthbert Moore-Brabazon (resigned 26 February 1932) Edmund Walter Hanbury Wood (elected at by-election 17 March 1932)	Municipal Reform	Edmund Walter Hanbury Wood	Municipal Reform
Woolwich, East	Herbert Morrison	Labour	Reginald H. Pott	Labour	Reginald H. Pott	Labour
Woolwich, East	Henry Berry	Labour	Henry Berry	Labour	Henry Berry	Labour
Woolwich, West	Frederick Thomas Halse	Municipal Reform	Frederick Thomas Halse	Municipal Reform	Dr S McClements	Labour
Woolwich, West	Ernest Henry Kemp	Municipal Reform	Ernest Henry Kemp	Municipal Reform	Ethel Maud Newman	Labour

‡ Previously councillor for a different division. ¶ Previously an alderman.

== County aldermen 1928–1937 ==
Term	Alderman	Party
1928 - 1934	David Davies	Municipal Reform
1928 - 1934	Lord Cranbrook (resigned 11 July 1930)	Municipal Reform
1928 - 1934	George Maurice Beaufoy (resigned 10 November 1928)	Municipal Reform
1928 - 1934	Ronald Collet Norman	Municipal Reform
1928 - 1934, 1934 - 1940	Sir George Hume	Municipal Reform
1928 - 1934	Charles William Matthews (died 17 December 1930)	Municipal Reform
1928 - 1934	Katherine Wallas	Independent
1928 - 1934, 1934 - 1940	Albert Emil Davies	Labour
1928 - 1934	Charles Latham	Labour
1928 - 1934	Dr Esther Rickards	Labour
1928 - 1934	Douglass Horace Boggis-Rolfe (in place of Beaufoy, 18 December 1928)	Municipal Reform
1930 - 1934	Alfred Charles Bossom (in place of Cranbrook 22 July 1930)	Municipal Reform
1930 - 1934	Catherine Fulford (in place of Matthews 24 December 1930)	Municipal Reform
1931 - 1937	Thelma Cazalet	Municipal Reform
1931 - 1934	Sir John Gilbert (died 1934)	Municipal Reform
1931 - 1937	Hubert John Greenwood	Municipal Reform
1931 - 1937	Captain Eric Hall	Municipal Reform
1931 - 1937	Major John Martin Oakey	Municipal Reform
1931 - 1937	Percival Harry Reed	Municipal Reform
1931 - 1937	Sir Oscar Warburg	Municipal Reform
1931 - 1937	Herbert Morrison	Labour
1931 - 1937	Ewart Gladstone Culpin	Labour
1931 - 1937	Walter Henry Green	Labour
1934 - 1940	William Harold Webbe	Municipal Reform
1934 - 1940	William Bennett	Labour
1934 - 1940	Jack Percy Blake	Labour
1934 - 1940	George Pearce Blizard	Labour
1934 - 1940	Henry Charles Charleton	Labour
1934 - 1940	Barbara Drake	Labour
1934 - 1940	William Thomas Kelly	Labour
1934 - 1940	Charles Robertson	Labour

== Party strength 1928–1937 ==
The strength of the parties on the council after each election was as follows:

Party	Councillors 1928	Aldermen 1928	Total 1928	Councillors 1931	Aldermen 1931	Total 1931	Councillors 1934	Aldermen 1934	Total 1934
Municipal Reform	77	12	89	83	13	96	55	9	64
Labour	42	6	48	35	6	41	69	11	80
Liberal	5	1	6	6	0	6	0	0	0
Independents	0	1	1	0	0	0	0	0	0

== See also ==
- List of members of London County Council 1889–1919
- List of members of London County Council 1937–1949
- List of chairmen of the London County Council
- 1919 London County Council election
- 1922 London County Council election
