= List of electoral divisions in the County of London =

This is a list of electoral divisions in the County of London that existed from 1889 for elections to the London County Council until 1965 when that authority was replaced by the Greater London Council. The County of London was divided into electoral divisions, coterminous with parliamentary constituencies.

== 1889–1919 ==
Each division elected two councillors, except for the City of London, which returned four.

- Battersea
- Bermondsey
- Bethnal Green North East
- Bethnal Green South West
- Bow and Bromley
- Brixton
- Camberwell North
- Chelsea
- City of London
- Clapham
- Deptford
- Dulwich
- Finsbury Central
- Finsbury East
- Fulham
- Greenwich
- Hackney Central
- Hackney North
- Hackney South
- Haggerston
- Hammersmith
- Hampstead
- Holborn
- Hoxton
- Islington East
- Islington North
- Islington South
- Islington West
- Kennington
- Kensington North
- Kensington South
- Lambeth North
- Lewisham
- Limehouse
- Marylebone East
- Marylebone West
- Mile End
- Newington West
- Norwood
- Paddington North
- Paddington South
- Peckham
- Poplar
- Rotherhithe
- St George's Hanover Square
- St George
- St Pancras East
- St Pancras North
- St Pancras South
- St Pancras West
- Southwark West
- Stepney
- Strand
- Walworth
- Wandsworth
- Westminster
- Whitechapel
- Woolwich

== 1919–1949 ==
The constituencies were redrawn by the Representation of the People Act 1918. Each division elected two councillors, except for the City of London, which returned four.

- Balham and Tooting
- Battersea North
- Battersea South
- Bermondsey West
- Bethnal Green North East
- Bethnal Green South West
- Bow and Bromley
- Brixton
- Camberwell North
- Camberwell North West
- Chelsea
- City of London
- Clapham
- Deptford
- Dulwich
- Finsbury
- Fulham East
- Fulham West
- Greenwich
- Hackney Central
- Hackney North
- Hackney South
- Hammersmith North
- Hammersmith South
- Hampstead
- Holborn
- Islington East
- Islington North
- Islington South
- Islington West
- Kennington
- Kensington North
- Kensington South
- Lambeth North
- Lewisham East
- Lewisham West
- Limehouse
- Mile End
- Norwood
- Paddington North
- Paddington South
- Peckham
- Poplar South
- Putney
- Rotherhithe
- St Marylebone
- St Pancras North
- St Pancras South East
- St Pancras South West
- Shoreditch
- Southwark Central
- Southwark North
- Southwark South East
- Stoke Newington
- Streatham
- Wandsworth Central
- Westminster Abbey
- Westminster St George's
- Whitechapel and St George's
- Woolwich East
- Woolwich West

== 1949–1964 ==
Following the Representation of the People Act 1948, each division elected three councillors each.

- Barons Court (1955–1964)
- Battersea North
- Battersea South
- Bermondsey
- Bethnal Green
- Brixton
- Chelsea
- Cities of London and Westminster
- Clapham
- Deptford
- Dulwich
- Fulham (1955–1965)
- Fulham East (1949–1955)
- Fulham West (1949–1955)
- Greenwich
- Hackney Central (1955–1964)
- Hackney South (1949–1955)
- Hammersmith North
- Hammersmith South (1949–1955)
- Hampstead
- Holborn and St Pancras South
- Islington East
- Islington North
- Islington South West
- Kensington North
- Kensington South
- Lewisham North
- Lewisham South
- Lewisham West
- Norwood
- Paddington North
- Paddington South
- Peckham
- Poplar
- Putney
- St Marylebone
- St Pancras North
- Shoreditch and Finsbury
- Southwark
- Stepney
- Stoke Newington and Hackney North
- Streatham
- Vauxhall
- Wandsworth Central
- Woolwich East
- Woolwich West

== See also ==
- List of electoral divisions in Greater London
