= Fulham East (London County Council constituency) =

London County Council constituency

- Former constituency for the London County Council

Former constituency
- Created: 1919
- Abolished: 1955
- Member(s): 2 (to 1949); 3 (from 1949)
- Created from: Fulham
- Replaced by: Fulham

Fulham East was a constituency used for elections to the London County Council between 1919 and 1955. The seat shared boundaries with the UK Parliament constituency of the same name. It was largely replaced by a new Fulham constituency.

== Councillors ==
Year	Name	Party	Name	Party	Name	Party
1919	Francis Lloyd	Municipal Reform	Beatrix Lyall	Municipal Reform Party	Two seats until 1949	
1922	Frank Holmes	Municipal Reform	Beatrix Lyall	Municipal Reform Party	Two seats until 1949	
1928	Bertram Mills	Municipal Reform	Beatrix Lyall	Municipal Reform Party	Two seats until 1949	
1934	Harry Barnes	Labour	Paul Williams	Labour	Two seats until 1949	
1935	Beatrix Lyall	Municipal Reform	Paul Williams	Labour	Two seats until 1949	
1937	Fred Powe	Labour	Paul Williams	Labour	Two seats until 1949	
1946	Fred Powe	Labour	Joan Ash	Labour	Two seats until 1949	
1949	Lilian Madge Dugdale	Conservative	Stephen Garvin	Conservative	Anthony Sumption	Conservative
1952	John Cronin	Labour	William Cuthbertson	Labour	Hilda Selwyn-Clarke	Labour

== Election results ==
1919 London County Council election: Fulham East
Party	Candidate	Votes	%	±%
Municipal Reform	Francis Lloyd	2,747	34.8	
Municipal Reform	Beatrix Lyall	2,673	33.8	
Labour	Robert Dunstan	1,264	16.0	
Labour	L. A. Hill	1,218	15.4	
Majority		1,409	17.8	
Municipal Reform hold		Swing		
Municipal Reform hold		Swing		

1922 London County Council election: Fulham East
Party	Candidate	Votes	%	±%
Municipal Reform	Beatrix Lyall	7,941	35.1	+1.3
Municipal Reform	Frank Holmes	7,849	34.7	−0.1
Labour	T. M. Cox	3,431	15.2	−0.8
Labour	Isaac Hayward	3,403	15.0	−0.4
Majority		4,418	19.5	−1.7
Municipal Reform hold		Swing		
Municipal Reform hold		Swing		

1925 London County Council election: Fulham East
Party	Candidate	Votes	%	±%
Municipal Reform	Beatrix Lyall	6,361		
Municipal Reform	Frank Holmes	6,210		
Labour	C. Wood	3,004		
Labour	M. S. Douglas	2,999		
Majority				
Municipal Reform hold		Swing		
Municipal Reform hold		Swing		

1928 London County Council election: Fulham East
Party	Candidate	Votes	%	±%
Municipal Reform	Beatrix Lyall	7,150		
Municipal Reform	Bertram Mills	6,979		
Labour	Maud Hortense Godfrey	3,619		
Labour	Francis Whatley Wright	3,533		
Liberal	Walter Colbert	1,416		
Liberal	Margaret Martin	1,365		
Majority				
Municipal Reform hold		Swing		
Municipal Reform hold		Swing		

1931 London County Council election: Fulham East
Party	Candidate	Votes	%	±%
Municipal Reform	Beatrix Lyall	7,162		
Municipal Reform	Bertram Mills	7,139		
Labour	Harry Samuels	2,860		
Labour	Will Lockyer	2,818		
Majority				
Municipal Reform hold		Swing		
Municipal Reform hold		Swing		

1934 London County Council election: Fulham East
Party	Candidate	Votes	%	±%
Labour	Paul Williams	8,422		
Labour	Harry Barnes	8,253		
Municipal Reform	Bertram Mills	7,611		
Municipal Reform	Beatrix Lyall	7,444		
Majority				
Labour gain from Municipal Reform		Swing		
Labour gain from Municipal Reform		Swing		

Fulham East by-election, 1935
Party	Candidate	Votes	%	±%
Municipal Reform	Beatrix Lyall	8,532		
Labour	J. E. MacColl	7,858		
Majority		674		
Municipal Reform gain from Labour		Swing		

1937 London County Council election: Fulham East
Party	Candidate	Votes	%	±%
Labour	Paul Williams	10,249		
Labour	Fred Powe	10,174		
Municipal Reform	Regina Evans	9,654		
Municipal Reform	John Hare	9,633		
Majority				
Labour hold		Swing		
Labour hold		Swing		

1946 London County Council election: Fulham East
Party	Candidate	Votes	%	±%
Labour	Fred Powe	6,946		
Labour	Joan Ash	6,902		
Conservative	G. A. Mitchell	5,260		
Conservative	J. A. Seys	5,166		
Majority				
Labour hold		Swing		
Labour hold		Swing		

1949 London County Council election: Fulham East
Party	Candidate	Votes	%	±%
Conservative	Lilian Madge Dugdale	11,461		
Conservative	Stephen Garvin	11,295		
Conservative	Anthony Sumption	11,063		
Labour	Fred Powe	10,438		
Labour	Richard Coppock	10,391		
Labour	Joan Thompson	10,284		
Conservative gain from Labour		Swing		
Conservative gain from Labour		Swing		
Conservative win (new seat)				

1952 London County Council election: Fulham East
Party	Candidate	Votes	%	±%
Labour	John Cronin	13,483		
Labour	Hilda Selwyn-Clarke	13,411		
Labour	William Cuthbertson	13,404		
Conservative	R. MacDonald-Hall	11,059		
Conservative	Lilian Madge Dugdale	10,988		
Conservative	G. B. Michell	10,851		
Labour gain from Conservative		Swing		
Labour gain from Conservative		Swing		
Labour gain from Conservative		Swing		
