= Ronald McKinnon Wood =

English Labour politician (1892–1967)

Ronald McKinnon Wood OBE (11 May 1892–22 October 1967) was a Labour Member of London County Council for Bethnal Green from 1946 to 1961. He served as Chairman of London County Council from 1957 to 1958.

The son of Thomas McKinnon Wood, he was educated at Highgate School, Merchant Taylors' School, Northwood and Pembroke College, Cambridge.

He married Gwendoline Elaine Dykes Spicer, daughter of Sir Albert Spicer, 1st Baronet in 1918. They had three children together.

Wood was appointed a Member of the Order of the British Empire (MBE) in the 1924 Birthday Honours, and promoted to Officer of the Order (OBE) in the 1928 Birthday Honours, when he was Principal Scientific Officer at the Royal Aircraft Establishment, Farnborough.

Civic offices
Preceded by Helen Bentwich	Chair of the London County Council; 1957–1958	Succeeded by Albert Samuels
