= Kath Duncan =

Scottish communist activist (1888-1954)

Katharine Sinclair Duncan (née MacColl; 4 July 1888 – 15 August 1954) was a Scottish communist activist and political candidate.

== Biography ==
She was born in Tarbert, Argyllshire to Archibald MacColl, a merchant, and Agnes Gibson MacColl (née Stephen). Katharine's father died when she was five, and her family moved to Kirkden, Argyllshire, near where her mother's parents lived.

Katharine became a schoolteacher in Kirkcaldy and joined the National Union of Teachers (NUT). In 1923 she married fellow teacher Alexander "Sandy" Duncan, and the couple relocated to Hackney, London. They were active in the Hackney Labour Dramatic Group, which was part of the radical Workers' Theatre Movement that flourished after the October Revolution. The Duncans belonged to the Independent Labour Party until the UK general strike of 1926, when they joined the Communist Party of Great Britain (CPGB).

Duncan rose to prominence in the CPGB as a powerful public speaker. In 1929, she was elected to the party's central committee, although she stepped down the following year after moving to Deptford. There, she focused her time on the National Unemployed Workers Movement (NUWM), organising large demonstrations. In the 1931 general election, she stood as the Communist Party candidate for Greenwich, where she received 2,000 votes.

In 1932, local dockers marched in opposition to ships sending arms to Japan, which had just invaded Manchuria. At a June 1932 demonstration in Woolwich, both Kath and Sandy spoke; police charged the crowd with batons and Sandy was hospitalised. A larger protest gathering of 8,000 was held the next day on the Deptford Broadway. Kath demanded that the presiding inspector from the previous day's demonstration must be sacked. Several months later, she was arrested and charged with being "a disturber of the Peace of our Lord the King, and an inciter of others to commit crimes and misdemeanours". She would not sign a pledge vowing to keep the peace for six months, and consequently spent a month in Holloway Prison.

Following Duncan's release, the London County Council removed her from their list of approved teachers, but the NUT organised a petition in her support, and the council reversed their decision. Duncan, meanwhile, continued giving public speeches, particularly in support of the NUWM. In 1934 she stood for election to the London County Council in Deptford, but was not successful. During this period in the mid-1930s, she was living on Ommaney Road, New Cross.

She was arrested again in 1935, for refusing to stop speaking outside a New Cross employment exchange even when asked by the police. The National Council for Civil Liberties supported her in one of their first interventions in a court case. She was found guilty, but the case of Duncan v Jones [1936] set a legal precedent by establishing that free speech was permitted unless it was likely to cause a disturbance.

In the late 1930s, much of Duncan's time was devoted to opposing fascism, and she took part in the Battle of Cable Street. She was central to the Aid to Spain movement, and interviewed volunteers for the International Brigade in the Spanish Civil War.

Sandy died during World War II, and Kath increasingly struggled with arthritis. Although still generally supportive of the CPGB, she began working for the local Labour Party MP. By the early 1950s, she was too ill to work, and moved in with her sister in Kirkcaldy.

Kath Duncan died of tuberculosis in Stracathro Hospital on 15 August 1954. She was 66.
