= Robert Charles Phillimore =

Phillimore in 1898

Robert Charles Phillimore (19 August 1871 – 12 September 1919) was a British liberal politician.

The eldest son of Walter Phillimore, he was educated at Westminster School then Christ Church, Oxford. He served as President of the Oxford Union in the Michaelmas terms of 1892 and 1895, the last person to hold the office twice. Rules prohibit such practice (since a later date).

Living in London, Phillimore became active in the Liberal Party, standing unsuccessfully for Ripon at the 1895 United Kingdom general election. He was also a member of the Fabian Society from 1893. He served as the Progressive Party secretary for Marylebone, and was elected to the civil parish council of Saint Pancras (covering at a lower tier than the relevant Metropolitan Borough from Kings Cross to Camden Town). From 1898 until 1919, Phillimore co-represented Deptford on London County Council. He stood unsuccessfully in St Albans at the December 1910 United Kingdom general election.

During World War I, Phillimore volunteered at the Hôpital Temporaire d'Arc-en-Barrois, an evacuation hospital in France.

His calendar of probate entry, a free public document, states he lived at Kendals Hall, Radlett, Hertfordshire and that his passing led to a few shillings less than £110,438 (equivalent to about £6,400,000 in 2023) passing to beneficiaries. His wife, Lucy, was executrix. It ascribes to him the style Right Honorable.
