= Angus Scott (politician) =

British politician

Angus Newton Scott (11 April 1876 – 21 December 1958) was a British politician.

Born in London, Scott was only young when his father died, and his mother moved the family to the Isle of Mull. He later returned to London, and attended the City of London School.

Scott became a chartered accountant in 1899, and in 1920 became a Fellow of the Institute of Chartered Accountants in England and Wales. He was also made a Freeman of the City of London, a liveryman of the Worshipful Company of Glaziers, and a Deputy Lieutenant of the County of London.

Scott was elected as a Municipal Reform Party candidate in Putney at the 1922 London County Council election. From 1927, he chaired the Finance Committee of the council, then in 1932 he became the Chairman of London County Council for a year. At the 1934 London County Council election, he switched to represent the City of London, serving until his retirement, in 1941.

In his spare time, Scott was a prominent freemason, and served as Grand Deacon of the United Grand Lodge of England.

Political offices
Preceded by John Maria Gatti	Chairman of the Finance Committee of London County Council; 1927–1932	Succeeded by Samuel Gluckstein
Preceded by Ernest Sanger	Chairman of London County Council; 1932–1933	Succeeded by Ernest Dence
