= Henry Keylock =

British politician

Henry Keylock (1836 – 2 May 1908) was a British politician.

Born in Gloucestershire, Keylock trained as a carpenter, then moved to London. He found work in Deptford with William Evelyn, and gradually became well off. He then became interested in politics, winning election to the Deptford Vestry, the Board of Guardians, and the Greenwich District Board of Works. On his initiative, Deptford Park was laid out, on land purchased from Evelyn.

Keylock stood in Deptford at the 1889 London County Council election, but was not elected. He won the seat in 1892, with the backing of the Progressive Party and the Labour Representation League, and served alongside Sidney Webb. He lost his seat at the 1895 London County Council election. When Deptford Metropolitan Borough Council was formed in 1900, he was one of the first aldermen. By this time, he had retired, and aligned himself instead with the right-wing Moderates.
