= Bethnal Green (London County Council constituency) =

London County Council constituency

- Former constituency for the London County Council

Former constituency
- Created: 1949
- Abolished: 1965
- Member(s): 3
- Created from: Bethnal Green North East and Bethnal Green South West

Bethnal Green was a constituency used for elections to the London County Council between 1949 and the council's abolition, in 1965. The seat shared boundaries with the UK Parliament constituency of the same name.

== Councillors ==
Year	Name	Party	Name	Party	Name	Party
1949	Percy Harris	Liberal	Beatrice Lilian Tate	Labour	Ronald McKinnon Wood	Labour
1952	Dorothy Holman	Labour	Beatrice Lilian Tate	Labour	Ronald McKinnon Wood	Labour
1961	Dorothy Holman	Labour	A. McLaughlin	Labour	Ashley Bramall	Labour

== Election results ==
1949 London County Council election: Bethnal Green
Party	Candidate	Votes	%	±%
Liberal	Percy Harris	8,305		
Labour	Beatrice Lilian Tate	8,236		
Labour	Ronald McKinnon Wood	8,115		
Labour	Helen Bentwich	7,877		
Liberal	Guy Darnley Naylor	7,652		
Liberal	Patrick Moynihan	7,573		
Liberal hold		Swing		
Labour hold		Swing		
Labour hold		Swing		

1952 London County Council election: Bethnal Green
Party	Candidate	Votes	%	±%
Labour	Dorothy Holman	11,277		
Labour	Beatrice Lilian Tate	10,290		
Labour	Ronald McKinnon Wood	9,735		
Liberal	Norman Harris	3,460		
Liberal	R. W. Scott	2,517		
Liberal	P. R. C. Lumsden	2,460		
Conservative	J. J. Harvey-Kelly	1,145		
Conservative	H. Seabag-Montefiore	1,110		
Labour gain from Liberal		Swing		
Labour hold		Swing		
Labour hold		Swing		

1955 London County Council election: Bethnal Green
Party	Candidate	Votes	%	±%
Labour	Dorothy Holman	10,263		
Labour	Beatrice Lilian Tate	10,087		
Labour	Ronald McKinnon Wood	9,545		
Liberal	J. Douglas	1,328		
Conservative	K. B. Campbell	1,194		
Liberal	J. Walters	1,178		
Liberal	S. Ainley	1,135		
Conservative	P. R. Roney	1,092		
Conservative	L. L. Ware	1,084		
Union Movement	F. Bailey	634		
Union Movement	Alexander Raven Thomson	540		
Union Movement	P. Duhig	476		
Labour hold		Swing		
Labour hold		Swing		
Labour hold		Swing		

1958 London County Council election: Bethnal Green
Party	Candidate	Votes	%	±%
Labour	Dorothy Holman	10,395		
Labour	Beatrice Lilian Tate	10,012		
Labour	Ronald McKinnon Wood	9,822		
Conservative	W. H. Ballard	721		
Conservative	R. Stock	615		
Conservative	R. Roney	543		
Socialist (GB)	A. W. Iverney	356		
Socialist (GB)	J. L. Read	333		
Socialist (GB)	F. James	306		
Labour hold		Swing		
Labour hold		Swing		
Labour hold		Swing		

1961 London County Council election: Bethnal Green
Party	Candidate	Votes	%	±%
Labour	Dorothy Holman	10,341		
Labour	A. McLaughlin	9,441		
Labour	Ashley Bramall	9,072		
Liberal	Tudor Gates	1,669		
Liberal	D. Sacker	1,539		
Liberal	D. E. Wolfe	1,429		
Conservative	W. H. Ballard	1,349		
Conservative	O. S. Henriques	1,146		
Conservative	J. G. Hemingway	1,112		
Labour hold		Swing		
Labour hold		Swing		
Labour hold		Swing		
