= Putney (London County Council constituency) =

London County Council constituency

- Former constituency for the London County Council

Former constituency
- Created: 1919
- Abolished: 1965
- Member(s): 2 (to 1949); 3 (from 1949)
- Created from: Wandsworth

Putney was a constituency used for elections to the London County Council between 1919 and the council's abolition, in 1965. The seat shared boundaries with the UK Parliament constituency of the same name.

== Councillors ==
Year	Name	Party	Name	Party	Name	Party
1919	Cooper Rawson	Municipal Reform	Charles Thomas Dickins	Municipal Reform	Two seats until 1949	
1922	William Hunt	Municipal Reform	Angus Scott	Municipal Reform	Two seats until 1949	
1931	Robert Taylor	Municipal Reform	Angus Scott	Municipal Reform	Two seats until 1949	
1934	Robert Taylor	Municipal Reform	Arthur Bellamy	Municipal Reform	Two seats until 1949	
1940	William Onslow	Conservative	Herbert Ryan	Conservative	Two seats until 1949	
1949	Deodora Croft	Conservative	Herbert Ryan	Conservative	Frank Headland East	Conservative
1952	Deodora Croft	Conservative	Frederick Swinbourn	Conservative	Frank Headland East	Conservative
1955	Deodora Croft	Conservative	Eileen Hoare	Conservative	Frank Headland East	Conservative
1955	Deodora Croft	Conservative	Eileen Hoare	Conservative	Geoffrey Johnson-Smith	Conservative
1958	Anne Kerr	Labour	James Archibald Parker	Labour	David Tutaev	Labour
1961	Anne Kerr	Labour	Eileen Hoare	Conservative	John Ian Tweedie-Smith	Conservative

== Election results ==
1919 London County Council election: Putney
Party	Candidate	Votes	%	±%
Municipal Reform	Cooper Rawson	Unopposed	n/a	n/a
Municipal Reform	Charles Thomas Dickins	Unopposed	n/a	n/a
Municipal Reform hold		Swing	n/a	
Municipal Reform hold		Swing	n/a	

1922 London County Council election: Putney
Party	Candidate	Votes	%	±%
Municipal Reform	William Hunt	8,307	41.1	
Municipal Reform	Angus Scott	8,231	40.7	
Labour	Eli Jenkins	1,894	9.4	n/a
Labour	G. Wyver	1,790	8.9	n/a
Majority		6,337	31.3	n/a
Municipal Reform hold		Swing	n/a	
Municipal Reform hold		Swing	n/a	

1925 London County Council election: Putney
Party	Candidate	Votes	%	±%
Municipal Reform	William Hunt	6,461		
Municipal Reform	Angus Scott	6,424		
Labour	W. Backhouse	1,867		
Labour	A. J. Hoare	1,842		
Majority				
Municipal Reform hold		Swing		
Municipal Reform hold		Swing		

1928 London County Council election: Putney
Party	Candidate	Votes	%	±%
Municipal Reform	Angus Scott	7,044		
Municipal Reform	William Hunt	7,023		
Labour	M. Beavan	2,530		
Labour	A. V. Holock	2,517		
Majority				
Municipal Reform hold		Swing		
Municipal Reform hold		Swing		

1931 London County Council election: Putney
Party	Candidate	Votes	%	±%
Municipal Reform	Angus Scott	7,202		
Municipal Reform	Robert Taylor	7,090		
Labour	B. Blyth	1,886		
Labour	Burfoot	1,885		
Majority				
Municipal Reform hold		Swing		
Municipal Reform hold		Swing		

1934 London County Council election: Putney
Party	Candidate	Votes	%	±%
Municipal Reform	Robert Taylor	7,382		
Municipal Reform	Arthur Bellamy	7,361		
Labour	A. D. Hillier	3,815		
Labour	T. Fox-Russell	3,761		
Majority				
Municipal Reform hold		Swing		
Municipal Reform hold		Swing		

1937 London County Council election: Putney
Party	Candidate	Votes	%	±%
Municipal Reform	Arthur Bellamy	10,509		
Municipal Reform	Robert Taylor	10,298		
Labour	Richard Adams	5,416		
Labour	W. Adams	5,415		
Majority				
Municipal Reform hold		Swing		
Municipal Reform hold		Swing		

1946 London County Council election: Putney
Party	Candidate	Votes	%	±%
Conservative	William Onslow	9,985		
Conservative	Herbert Ryan	9,970		
Labour	W. T. F. Iles	6,619		
Labour	F. E. Key	6,540		
Majority				
Conservative hold		Swing		
Conservative hold		Swing		

1949 London County Council election: Putney
Party	Candidate	Votes	%	±%
Conservative	Deodora Croft	19,365		
Conservative	Frank Headland East	18,896		
Conservative	Herbert Ryan	18,826		
Labour	W. Griffiths	11,803		
Labour	I. D. Scott	11,315		
Labour	E. Whitlock	11,249		
Conservative win (new seat)				
Conservative hold		Swing		
Conservative hold		Swing		

1952 London County Council election: Putney
Party	Candidate	Votes	%	±%
Conservative	Deodora Croft	17,361		
Conservative	Frederick Swinbourn	16,953		
Conservative	Frank Headland East	16,941		
Labour	Cyril Willey Jerome Bird	12,593		
Labour	P. Haddy	12,206		
Labour	G. F. Lee	12,106		
Conservative hold		Swing		
Conservative hold		Swing		
Conservative hold		Swing		

1955 London County Council election: Putney
Party	Candidate	Votes	%	±%
Conservative	Deodora Croft	17,511		
Conservative	Frank Headland East	17,219		
Conservative	Eileen Hoare	17,099		
Labour	Vera Dart	12,585		
Labour	E. S. Henrich	12,510		
Labour	A. D. Bermel	12,408		
Conservative hold		Swing		
Conservative hold		Swing		
Conservative hold		Swing		

1958 London County Council election: Putney
Party	Candidate	Votes	%	±%
Labour	James Archibald Parker	16,342		
Labour	Anne Clarke	15,981		
Labour	David Tutaev	15,950		
Conservative	Gordon Passmore	14,726		
Conservative	Geoffrey Johnson-Smith	14,516		
Conservative	Eileen Hoare	14,099		
Labour gain from Conservative		Swing		
Labour gain from Conservative		Swing		
Labour gain from Conservative		Swing		

1961 London County Council election: Putney
Party	Candidate	Votes	%	±%
Labour	Anne Kerr	15,401		
Conservative	Eileen Hoare	15,263		
Conservative	John Tweedie-Smith	15,235		
Conservative	Gordon Passmore	15,161		
Labour	James Archibald Parker	15,029		
Labour	David Tutaev	14,867		
Liberal	Margaret Wingfield	3,882		
Liberal	Rhys Lloyd	3,742		
Liberal	H. de Bossart	3,545		
Conservative gain from Labour		Swing		
Conservative gain from Labour		Swing		
Labour hold		Swing		
