= John Speakman (British politician) =

British politician and trade unionist (1873–1942)

John Speakman (1873 – 7 August 1942) was a British politician and trade unionist, who served on London County Council.

Born in Erith, Speakman became a tram conductor. He joined the Tram and Bus Workers' Union, from 1897 serving on its executive committee, and from 1900 as the secretary of its Kent branch. In 1903, it merged into the Amalgamated Association of Tramway and Vehicle Workers, and from 1905, Speakman was full-time secretary of the union's London District. He relocated to Deptford, and he was also elected to the union's National Executive Committee.

In 1910, Speakman was elected as national president of his union, and in 1912 his role was expanded, as he became secretary of the union's South East Area. In 1919, the union became part of the United Vehicle Workers, and Speakman became the union's Southern Administrator. Three years later, the union became part of the new Transport and General Workers' Union, Speakman becoming an administrative officer.

Speakman supported the Labour Party, and was elected to Deptford Metropolitan Borough Council in 1909. He served until 1919, when he was elected to represent Deptford at the 1919 London County Council election. He lost the seat in 1922, but was re-elected to the borough council, then at the 1925 London County Council election regained his county council seat. In 1932/33, he served as Mayor of Deptford.

Speakman was Vice Chairman of London County Council in 1938/39, although he never held the top job. He died in 1942, still in office.

Civic offices
Preceded by George William Strong	Mayor of Deptford; 1932–1933	Succeeded by William Thomas Cleobury
