= Beatrix Lyall =

British social reformer and politician

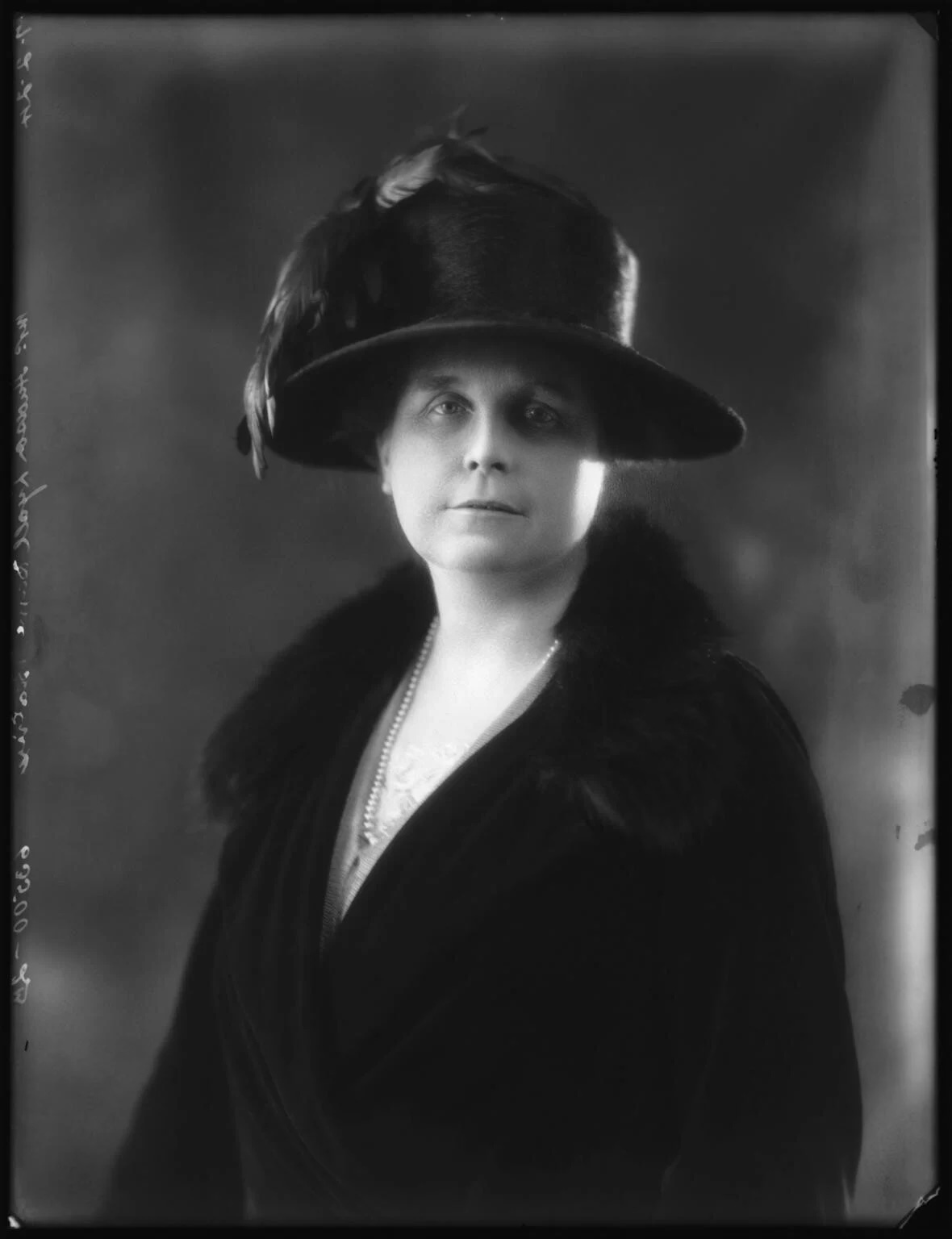
Lyall in 1924

Dame Beatrix Margaret Lyall, DBE, JP (née Rostron; 27 October 1873 – 8 May 1948) was a British social reformer and London politician.

== Early life ==
She was born in 1873 to Simpson Rostron, a barrister from Beddington, Surrey, and his wife Christina Jane (née Riley), both of whom held strong Christian beliefs, and were deeply involved in the activities of the Church of England, as well as being active in the Conservative Party.

== Marriage and family ==
On 15 June 1899, she married George Henry Hudson Pile, a childhood friend and son of a former Speaker of the House of Assembly of Barbados. In 1914, she became Beatrix Lyall when her husband changed his surname by deed poll, assuming his mother's maiden name. They settled in Chelsea, London and had a son, Archibald, and a daughter, Christina Marion.

== World War One ==
By 1914, Beatrix Lyall was known in her role as leader of the Mothers Union, and was noted for her public speaking skills and her campaigning for child welfare. During the war she gave her services to a number of government departments and served on the War Savings Committee. She gave addresses to munitions workers and miners which were published by the British Women's Patriotic League. In 1919 she was made a Commander of the Order of the British Empire for her services during the conflict.

== Politics ==
Lyall's high public profile led to her being approached by the Conservative-backed Municipal Reform Party to stand for election to the London County Council. In March 1919 she was duly elected as a councillor for Fulham East. In 1924 she was made a Dame Commander of the Order of the British Empire. She served as vice-chairman of the council from 1932 to 1933, and was the first woman to hold the post.

In 1934 she lost her seat on the council when the Labour Party took control for the first time. She returned to the council in December 1935 when a by-election was held, but did not stand for the subsequent election in 1937.

== Later years and death ==
Following her retirement from local politics, Lyall continued to be active in the Mothers Union, authoring pamphlets promoting "Christian marriage" and denouncing divorce. She was made a life vice-president of the organisation in 1937. She was to suffer the loss of her daughter in October 1937, and of her husband in May 1938.

During the Second World War, she was appointed head of hospital supplies for South London, and was a member of the executive of the National Council of Women. She spent her final years at the Prince of Wales Hotel in Kensington. She died at the hotel in May 1948 from heart failure, aged 74. She was cremated at Golders Green.
