= 1949 London County Council election =

1949 local election in England

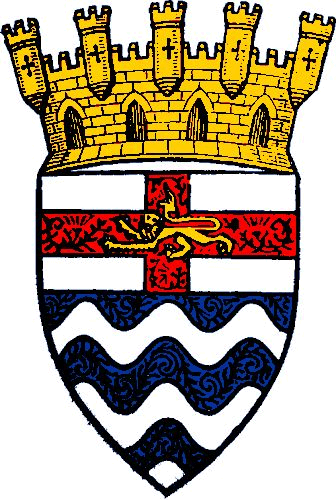
- 7 April 1949
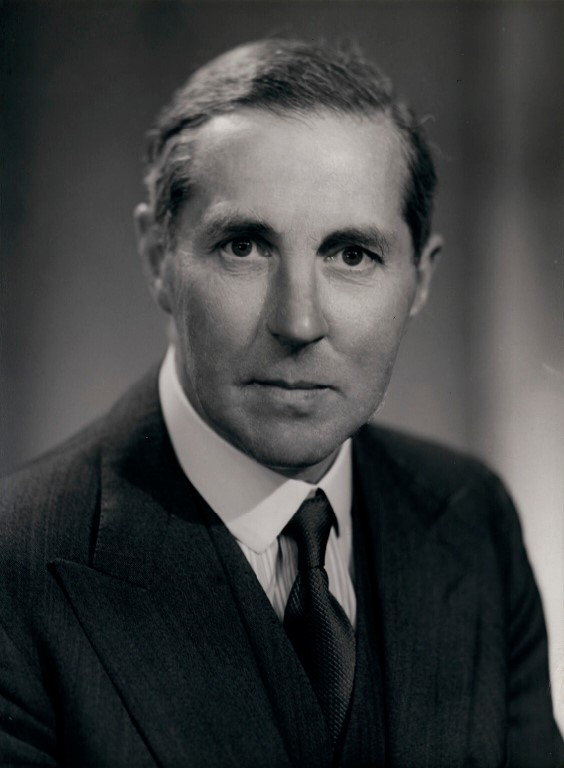

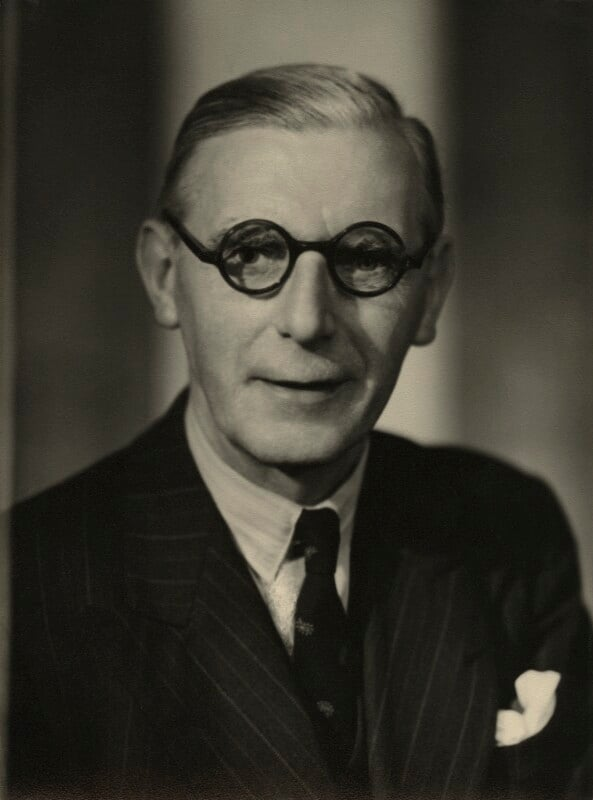

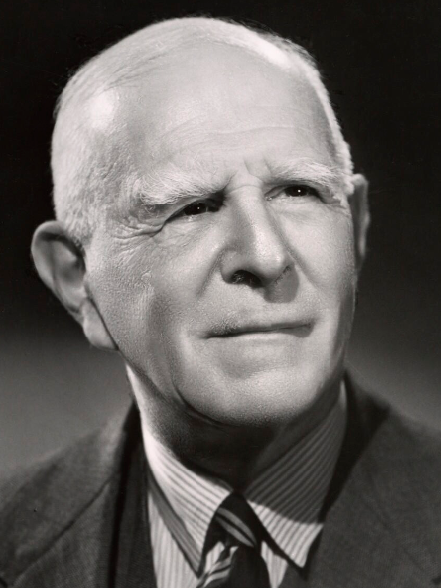
	First party	Second party	Third party
Leader	Henry Brooke	Isaac Hayward	Percy Harris
Party	Conservative	Labour	Liberal
Leader since	1946	1947
Leader's seat	Cities of London and Westminster	Deptford	Bethnal Green
Seats won	64	64	1
Seat change	▲34	▼26	▼1
Popular vote	1,526,000	1,404,805	37,266
Percentage	50.9%	46.9%	1.2%

An election to the County Council of London took place on 7 April 1949. The council was elected by First Past the Post with each elector having three votes in the three-member seats. The Conservative Party made substantial gains, achieving the same number of seats as the Labour Party. However, Labour held the chair of the council, and was thus able to retain control.

The constituencies were completely reorganised before the election. The 60 former two-member constituencies and one four-member constituency were replaced by 43 three-member constituencies, to align with the UK Parliamentary constituencies due to be introduced at the 1950 UK general election.

== Campaign ==
The Labour Party campaigned on its progress on the County of London Plan, its construction of housing and schools, and its takeover of health services.

The Conservative Party chose not to stand candidates in Bethnal Green, where it hoped its supporters would instead vote for the Liberal Party candidates. It argued that the Labour administration was short of talent.

The Liberal Party and Communist Party of Great Britain each stood only six candidates, and hoped to retain representation in their strongest areas: Bethnal Green for the Liberals, and Stepney for the Communists.

== Results ==
The Conservative Party secured the most votes, but won the same number of seats as the Labour Party. The Liberal Party leader Percy Harris was the only other councillor to win a seat. The Communist Party failed to win any seats. Because there were ten appointed aldermen, all Labour representatives, Labour retained a majority for the election of a new chair, who would hold a casting vote. While this would usually be a council member, the party instead selected J. W. Bowen, a party member who was not on the council, and thereby secured an ongoing majority. Thus assured, it agreed to a Conservative proposal to arrange for the election of new aldermen in proportion to the party strengths.

Turnout at the election was 39%, a considerable increase from 26% three years earlier.

Party	Votes			Seats	
Party	Number	%	Stood	Seats	%
Conservative	1,526,000	50.9	126	64	49.6
Labour	1,404,805	46.9	129	64	49.6
Liberal	37,266	1.2	6	1	0.8
Communist	26,666	0.9	6	0	0.0
Union Movement	1,253	0.0	2	0	0.0
Independent	617	0.0	1	0	0.0
