= Deptford (London County Council constituency) =

London County Council constituency

- Former constituency for the London County Council

Former constituency
- Created: 1889
- Abolished: 1965
- Member(s): 2 (to 1949); 3 (from 1949)

Deptford was a constituency used for elections to the London County Council between 1889 and the council's abolition, in 1965. The seat shared boundaries with the UK Parliament constituency of the same name.

== Councillors ==
Year	Name	Party	Name	Party	Name	Party
1889	Ernest Collard	Progressive	William Hazlewood Phillips	Progressive	Two seats until 1949	
1892	Henry Keylock	Labour Progressive	Sidney Webb	Progressive	Two seats until 1949	
1895	John Dumphreys	Moderate	Sidney Webb	Progressive	Two seats until 1949	
1898	Robert Charles Phillimore	Progressive	Sidney Webb	Progressive	Two seats until 1949	
1910	William Freeman Barrett	Municipal Reform	Edwin Mumford Preston	Municipal Reform	Two seats until 1949	
1913	Robert Charles Phillimore	Progressive	John Theodore Prestige	Municipal Reform	Two seats until 1949	
1919	Margaret McMillan	Labour	John Speakman	Labour	Two seats until 1949	
1922	Marshall James Pike	Municipal Reform	Guy Herbert Walmisley	Municipal Reform	Two seats until 1949	
1925	James Mahoney	Labour	John Speakman	Labour	Two seats until 1949	
1937	Isaac Hayward	Labour	John Speakman	Labour	Two seats until 1949	
1942	Isaac Hayward	Labour	Ernest Sherwood	Labour	Two seats until 1949	
1949	Isaac Hayward	Labour	Ernest Sherwood	Labour	William James Coombs	Labour
1952	Isaac Hayward	Labour	Alfred Seabrook Simons	Labour	Harold Shearman	Labour
1955	Eugene Murphy	Labour	Alfred Seabrook Simons	Labour	Harold Shearman	Labour
1961	Albert John Blackman	Labour	Alfred Seabrook Simons	Labour	Harold Shearman	Labour

== Election results ==
1889 London County Council election: Deptford
Party	Candidate	Votes	%	±%
Moderate	Ernest Collard	2,294		
Progressive	William Phillips	2,283		
Labour Progressive	Henry Keylock	1,871		
Independent Progressive	Althro Alfred Knight	1,047		
Moderate win (new seat)				
Progressive win (new seat)				

1892 London County Council election: Deptford
Party	Candidate	Votes	%	±%
Progressive	Sidney Webb	4,088		
Labour Progressive	Henry Keylock	3,503		
Moderate	Henry T. Banning	2,251		
Moderate	John C. Bailey	2,231		
Social Democratic Federation	John Elliott	780		
Independent Progressive	Althro Alfred Knight	321		
Progressive hold		Swing		
Labour Progressive gain from Moderate		Swing		

1895 London County Council election: Deptford
Party	Candidate	Votes	%	±%
Progressive	Sidney Webb	4,286		
Moderate	John Dumphreys	2,667		
Moderate	H. S. A. Foy	2,518		
Progressive	Henry Keylock	2,402		
Ind. Labour Party	John Elliott	1,255		
Moderate gain from Labour Progressive		Swing		
Progressive hold		Swing		

1898 London County Council election: Deptford
Party	Candidate	Votes	%	±%
Progressive	Sidney Webb	4,512		
Progressive	Robert Charles Phillimore	4,487		
Moderate	H. S. A. Foy	3,218		
Moderate	John Dumphreys	2,866		
Ind. Labour Party	J. Yallop	233		
Progressive gain from Moderate		Swing		
Progressive hold		Swing		

1901 London County Council election: Deptford
Party	Candidate	Votes	%	±%
Progressive	Sidney Webb	5,496	33.3	+3.4
Progressive	Robert Charles Phillimore	5,349	32.4	+2.7
Conservative	Thomas William Marchant	2,865	17.4	−3.9
Conservative	Francis Herman Milford Wayne	2,781	16.9	−2.1
Progressive hold		Swing		
Progressive hold		Swing	+6.0	

1904 London County Council election: Deptford
Party	Candidate	Votes	%	±%
Progressive	Sidney Webb	unopposed	n/a	n/a
Progressive	Robert Charles Phillimore	unopposed	n/a	n/a
Progressive hold		Swing	n/a	
Progressive hold		Swing	n/a	

1907 London County Council election: Deptford
Party	Candidate	Votes	%	±%
Progressive	Sidney Webb	6,185		
Progressive	Robert Charles Phillimore	6,083		
Municipal Reform	H. G. Wells	5,879		
Municipal Reform	William Freeman Barrett	5,839		
Independent	R. R. Fairburn	182		
Majority				
Progressive hold		Swing		
Progressive hold		Swing		

1910 London County Council election: Deptford
Party	Candidate	Votes	%	±%
Municipal Reform	William Freeman Barrett	5,932	28.6	
Municipal Reform	Edwin Mumford Preston	5,047	24.3	
Progressive	William James Pethybridge	4,910	23.6	
Labour	Campion Watson	4,880	23.5	
Majority				
Municipal Reform gain from Progressive		Swing		
Municipal Reform gain from Progressive		Swing		

1913 London County Council election: Deptford
Party	Candidate	Votes	%	±%
Municipal Reform	John Theodore Prestige	5,704	25.3	−3.3
Progressive	Robert Charles Phillimore	5,667	25.1	+1.5
Municipal Reform	Thomas Kincaid-Smith	5,643	25.0	+0.7
Labour	Charles Mostyn Lloyd	5,532	24.5	+1.0
Majority		172	0.8	−4.3
Municipal Reform hold		Swing	-2.2	
Majority		24	0.1	
Progressive gain from Municipal Reform		Swing	+0.4	

1919 London County Council election: Deptford
Party	Candidate	Votes	%	±%
Labour	Margaret McMillan	4,575	31.0	
Labour	John Speakman	4,356	29.5	
Municipal Reform	William Francis Marchant	3,094	21.0	
Municipal Reform	Fred Bramston	2,730	18.5	
Majority		1,262	8.6	
Labour gain from Progressive		Swing		
Labour gain from Municipal Reform		Swing		

1922 London County Council election: Deptford
Party	Candidate	Votes	%	±%
Municipal Reform	Guy Herbert Walmisley	9,545	25.4	+4.4
Municipal Reform	Marshall James Pike	9,487	25.3	+6.8
Labour	Margaret McMillan	9,333	24.8	−6.2
Labour	John Speakman	9,199	24.5	−5.0
Majority		154	0.5	−8.1
Municipal Reform gain from Labour		Swing		
Municipal Reform gain from Labour		Swing		

1925 London County Council election: Deptford
Party	Candidate	Votes	%	±%
Labour	James Mahoney	12,222		
Labour	John Speakman	12,056		
Municipal Reform	Guy Herbert Walmisley	7,823		
Municipal Reform	A. G. Harben	7,540		
Majority				
Labour gain from Municipal Reform		Swing		
Labour gain from Municipal Reform		Swing		

1928 London County Council election: Deptford
Party	Candidate	Votes	%	±%
Labour	James Mahoney	13,523		
Labour	John Speakman	13,422		
Municipal Reform	M. Glenn McCarthy	7,545		
Municipal Reform	J. C. Manifold	7,485		
Majority				
Labour hold		Swing		
Labour hold		Swing		

1931 London County Council election: Deptford
Party	Candidate	Votes	%	±%
Labour	James Mahoney	10,738		
Labour	John Speakman	10,695		
Municipal Reform	J. R. Chalmers	6,440		
Municipal Reform	G. F. Kingham	6,374		
Majority				
Labour hold		Swing		
Labour hold		Swing		

1934 London County Council election: Deptford
Party	Candidate	Votes	%	±%
Labour	John Speakman	14,800		
Labour	James Mahoney	14,558		
Municipal Reform	John Southwell	7,215		
Municipal Reform	G. F. Kingham	7,176		
Communist	Kath Duncan	1,387		
Communist	V. Parker	1,177		
Majority				
Labour hold		Swing		
Labour hold		Swing		

1937 London County Council election: Deptford
Party	Candidate	Votes	%	±%
Labour	John Speakman	16,605		
Labour	Isaac Hayward	16,050		
Municipal Reform	G. F. Kingham	7,948		
Municipal Reform	John Southwell	7,908		
Majority				
Labour hold		Swing		
Labour hold		Swing		

1946 London County Council election: Deptford
Party	Candidate	Votes	%	±%
Labour	Isaac Hayward	8,608		
Labour	Ernest Sherwood	8,540		
Conservative	F. Andrews	3,775		
Conservative	V. T. Reed	3,715		
Majority				
Labour hold		Swing		
Labour hold		Swing		

1949 London County Council election: Deptford
Party	Candidate	Votes	%	±%
Labour	William James Coombs	14,087		
Labour	Isaac Hayward	14,074		
Labour	Ernest C. Sherwood	13,933		
Conservative	Mrs Davies	8,702		
Conservative	Richard Body	8,561		
Conservative	F. Andrews	8,521		
Labour win (new seat)				
Labour hold		Swing		
Labour hold		Swing		

1952 London County Council election: Deptford
Party	Candidate	Votes	%	±%
Labour	Isaac Hayward	16,606		
Labour	Harold Shearman	15,733		
Labour	Alfred Seabrook Simons	15,415		
Conservative	E. Greenaway	7,198		
Conservative	A. Bowden	6,998		
Conservative	H. Marsh	6,772		
Labour hold		Swing		
Labour hold		Swing		
Labour hold		Swing		

1955 London County Council election: Deptford
Party	Candidate	Votes	%	±%
Labour	Harold Shearman	10,660		
Labour	Eugene Murphy	10,639		
Labour	Alfred Seabrook Simons	10,478		
Conservative	B. J. Jenkins	5,586		
Conservative	E. M. Wheeler	5,439		
Conservative	R. S. Guest	5,343		
Labour hold		Swing		
Labour hold		Swing		
Labour hold		Swing		

1958 London County Council election: Deptford
Party	Candidate	Votes	%	±%
Labour	Harold Shearman	10,471		
Labour	Eugene Murphy	10,406		
Labour	Alfred Seabrook Simons	10,257		
Conservative	Joan Vickers	3,553		
Conservative	F. K. Roberts	3,545		
Conservative	J. F. Rowley	3,538		
Labour hold		Swing		
Labour hold		Swing		
Labour hold		Swing		

1961 London County Council election: Deptford
Party	Candidate	Votes	%	±%
Labour	Albert John Blackman	9,702		
Labour	Alfred Seabrook Simons	9,097		
Labour	Harold Shearman	8,595		
Conservative	I. H. Davison	4,805		
Conservative	D. P. Jeffcock	4,542		
Conservative	P. S. F. Noble	4,503		
British National	R. Simpson	1,520		
British National	A. Charman	1,337		
British National	J. E. Stanton	838		
Labour hold		Swing		
Labour hold		Swing		
Labour hold		Swing		
