= Francis Lloyd (British Army officer) =

British Army general (1853–1926)

Lieutenant-General Sir Francis Lloyd GCVO KCB DSO DL
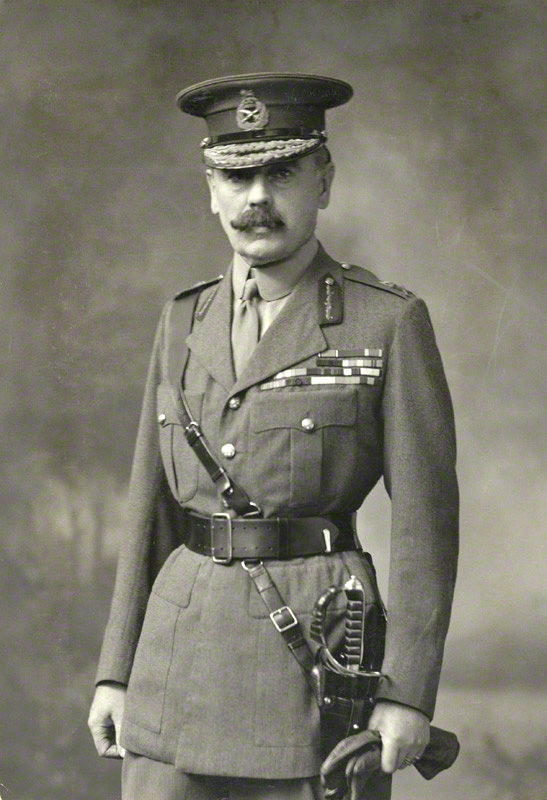
- Lloyd in October 1918
- Born: 12 August 1853; London
- Died: 26 February 1926 (aged 72); Chigwell, Essex
- Military career
- Allegiance: United Kingdom
- Branch: British Army
- Service years: 1874–1920
- Rank: Lieutenant-General
- Units: Duke of Wellington's Regiment; Grenadier Guards
- Commands: London District; Welsh Division; 1st (Guards) Brigade; 1st Battalion, Grenadier Guards; 2nd Battalion, Grenadier Guards
- Conflicts: Mahdist War; Second Boer War; First World War
- Awards: Knight Grand Cross of the Royal Victorian Order; Knight Commander of the Order of the Bath; Distinguished Service Order; Mentioned in Despatches; Order of Saint Sava

Lieutenant-General Sir Francis Lloyd, GCVO, KCB, DSO, DL (12 August 1853 – 26 February 1926) was a senior British Army officer. He rose to become Major-General commanding the Brigade of Guards and General Officer Commanding London District from 1913 to 1918.

== Family and early life ==
He was the eldest son of Colonel Richard Lloyd, Grenadier Guards of Aston Hall, Oswestry, Shropshire, and his wife Lady Frances Hay, daughter of the 11th Earl of Kinnoul. He was sent to Harrow School, but left after three years. He was a county cricketer for Shropshire between 1871 and 1873 while playing at club level for Oswestry.

== Military career ==
Lloyd was commissioned as a sub-lieutenant into the 33rd (or The Duke of Wellington's) Regiment in 1874. He transferred to his father's regiment, the Grenadier Guards, later that year. Two years later he was promoted to full lieutenant.

He obtained his captaincy in 1885 and in the same year took part in the Suakin Expedition as signalling officer to the Guards Brigade. He was mentioned in dispatches for his service at the Battle of Hasheen. He was appointed regimental adjutant of the Grenadier Guards in 1889.

In 1892 he was promoted to major. He became Commandant of the School of Instruction for Militia and Volunteers in 1894 and Commander of the Guards Depot in 1896.

In 1898 he was promoted to the rank of lieutenant colonel, and was appointed 2nd in command of the 1st battalion. He took part in the Nile Expedition and fought at the Siege of Khartoum in 1898, again being mentioned in despatches and receiving the Distinguished Service Order (DSO).

After their return to the United Kingdom, he was in October 1898 appointed in command of the 2nd Battalion, Grenadier Guards. After the outbreak of the Second Boer War in late 1899, the 2nd Battalion was in March 1900 sent to reinforce British forces in South Africa. Lloyd was the battalion's commanding officer throughout the Second Boer War and was severely wounded at Biddulphsberg in the Orange River Colony. Following the end of the war, he returned home with the men of his battalion on the SS Galeka in October 1902. For his service in the war, Lloyd was appointed a Companion of the Order of the Bath (CB) in the April 1901 South Africa Honours list (the award was dated to 29 November 1900), and he received the actual decoration after his return, from King Edward VII at Buckingham Palace on 24 October 1902.

He was promoted to the brevet rank of colonel on 23 October 1902, and placed on half-pay as he resigned his command of the 2nd Battalion on 28 October 1902, but was soon back as Commanding Officer of the 1st Battalion of his regiment from 14 February 1903 to 14 February 1904 when he relinquished command and was placed on half-pay. In May 1904 he became commander of the 1st (Guards) Brigade, part of the 1st Division of the 1st Army Corps at Aldershot, with the temporary rank of brigadier general, while employed in this position, and substantive colonel. He relinquished command of the brigade, along with his temporary rank, in May 1908 and then once again served on half-pay. He was made general officer commanding the Welsh Division of the Territorial Force (TF) in 1909 and appointed a Commander of the Royal Victorian Order (CVO). He was promoted to major general on 7 December 1909.

On the occasion of the coronation of King George V in 1911 he was made a Knight Commander of the Order of the Bath (KCB). In 1913, at the age of 60, his command of the Welsh Division expired. He was promoted to Major-General commanding the Brigade of Guards and GOC London District.

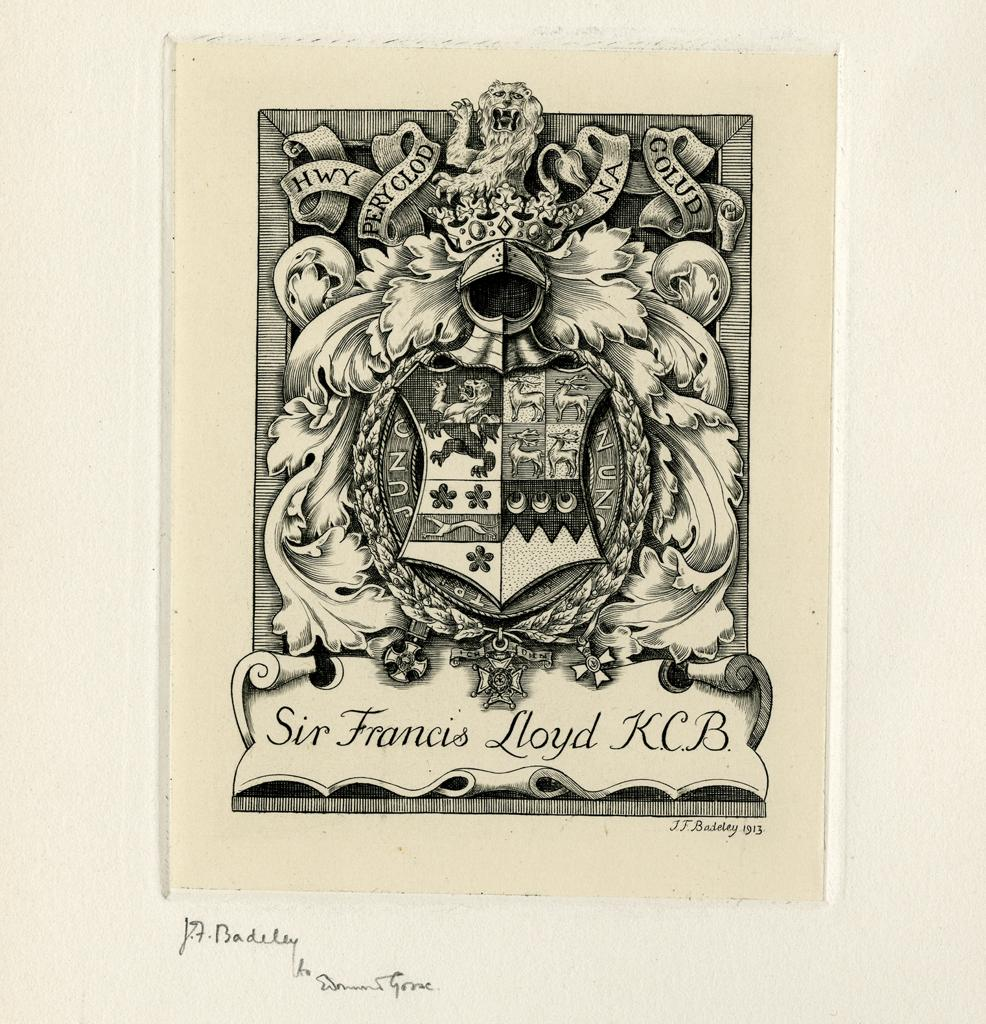
Lloyd's bookplate, by Henry Badeley

=== First World War ===
During the First World War, he was responsible for the defence of London, particularly from attack by Zeppelins, and was given delegated powers over trains and hospitals. In 1915 he was appointed to the largely honorary position of colonel of the Royal Welsh Fusiliers. He was made Knight of Grace of the Order of St John in 1916. In 1917 he was requested to continue in command of London District, and was promoted to lieutenant general. In September 1918 he was advanced to Knight Grand Cross of the Royal Victorian Order.

Lloyd was awarded a number of decorations by the states allied to the United Kingdom: the Belgian Order of the Crown and two Serbian orders, the Order of St Sava and the Order of the White Eagle.

== Retirement ==
Lloyd's term as commander of the London District ended on 1 October 1918, when he was replaced by Geoffrey Feilding. He was subsequently appointed Food Commissioner for London and Home Counties. In 1920 he was placed on the retired list.

A Conservative, Lloyd attempted to stand in the 1918 general election, but was unable to find a seat. In retirement he became a member of London County Council representing Fulham East. He made his home at Rolls Park in Chigwell, Essex where he died in February 1926. He was survived by his wife Mary Ann Elizabeth Ponton née Gunnis of Leckie, Stirlingshire. The couple had no children. His funeral service was held at the Guards Chapel, Wellington Barracks on 4 March and he was buried at Aston Hall chapel on the following day.

== In popular culture ==
Lloyd was a friend of John Buchan who dedicated to Lloyd the 1916 novel The Power-House.

Military offices
Preceded by Augustus Hill	GOC Welsh Division; 1909–1913	Succeeded by John Lindley
Preceded by Sir Alfred Codrington	GOC London District; 1913–1918	Succeeded by Sir Geoffrey Feilding
