= James Mahoney (politician) =

British priest and socialist politician

James Mahoney (1873 – 28 September 1938) was a British Catholic priest and socialist politician.

Educated at St Wilfrid's College and the English College in Rome, Mahoney became a priest in 1900. He began ministering to a parish in Woolwich, then moved to Dartford, and finally, in 1916, to Deptford. He joined the Labour Party, and stood successfully for it in Deptford at the 1925 London County Council election, serving until 1937.
