= Isaac Hayward =

British politician

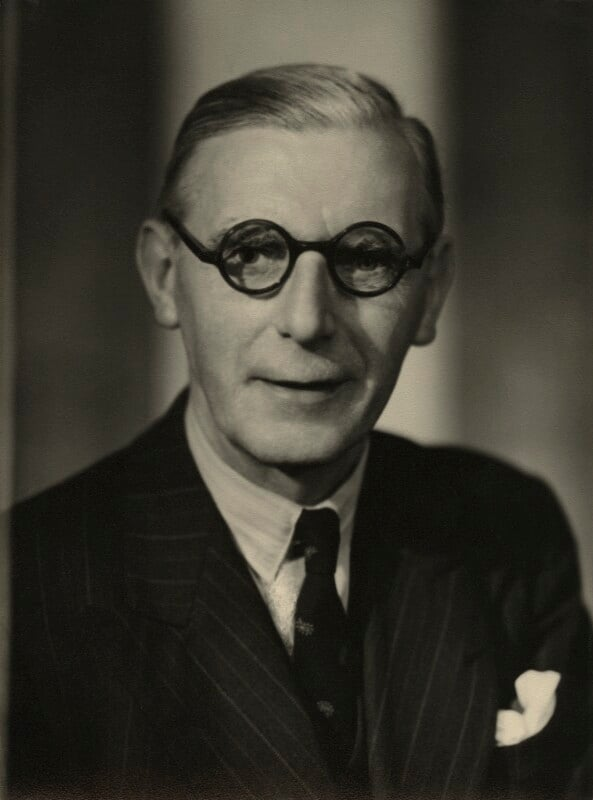
Hayward in 1950

Sir Isaac James Hayward (17 November 1884 – 3 January 1976) was a British politician who was the longest-serving leader of the London County Council. He served from 1947 until it was abolished on the expansion of London (to form Greater London) in 1965.

== Biography ==
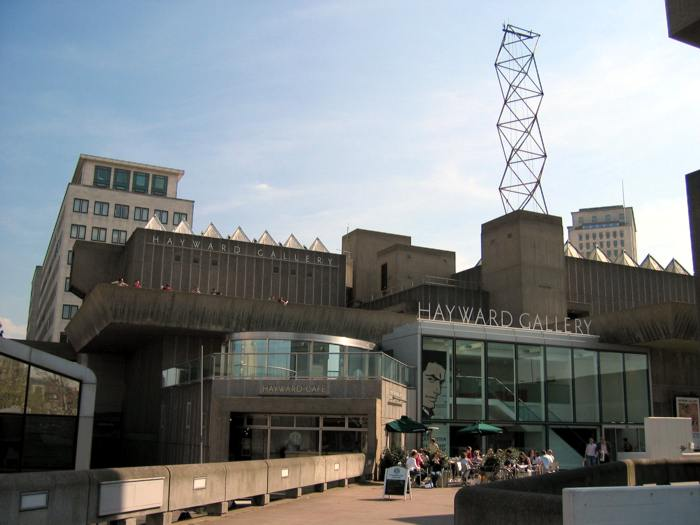
The Hayward Gallery

Hayward was the son of a miner from Blaenavon, Monmouthshire, and helped in the mining some years from the age of 12. He became involved in trade union affairs and was chosen as a union official, which brought him to London. From 1932 he was General Secretary of the National Union of Enginemen, Firemen, Mechanics and Electrical Workers, retiring in 1946 when his other commitments precluded continuing.

As a trade unionist he also became active in the Labour Party and was selected in 1928 to stand for the party in the London County Council elections in the safe seat of Rotherhithe. Herbert Morrison spotted him and in 1932 appointed him Chief Whip to the Labour Group, a job he retained until he became Leader. Hayward switched to representing Deptford in 1937, and sat until 1955; he served as an Alderman from 1955 until the LCC was abolished in 1965 – a record of 36 years unbroken service which was more than any other member in the LCC's history.

When Labour won power in 1934, Morrison appointed Hayward to the crucial job of Chairman of the Public Assistance Committee. His job there was to turn the antiquated Poor law system into a genuine system of welfare, and he instituted more generous programmes of help with rents and fuel, as well as building homes for the elderly that allowed for genuine privacy. Hayward had several other important Chairmanships from 1937.

From 1945 Hayward was given the Education Chair. He was convinced that the future of education lay in comprehensive schools, of which there were none at the time. This was a highly controversial policy and Hayward had to steer it through opposition while restraining the demands of its strongest supporters. This success, and his skill in managing the party machine, led to his election as Leader in 1947. This LCC leading position had official status since 1933.

The LCC was invited by the Government to build a concert hall in time for the Festival of Britain in 1951. Despite the short timetable Hayward was convinced that it could do it, and the Royal Festival Hall was opened on time. He expanded patronage of the arts and commissioned contemporary works. The Hayward Gallery on the South Bank is named in his honour. He was knighted in 1959. His tenure lasted 23% of the Council's lifespan and was almost double that of the two next-nearest in length.

Hayward led the Labour Party's opposition to the Herbert Report recommendations that the LCC be abolished and replaced by a Greater London Council, pointing to the work the LCC had done. However, there was a great deal of self-interest involved as the LCC had by this time become merely the inner urban boroughs. These had seen re-housed elsewhere well over one and a half a million residents in a 50-year population downturn (which would then continue another 20 years), had several coal-fired power stations and did not attract the property investment of a 21st-century internationally well-connected London. LCC had a 30-year left-wing majority and when it was more right-wing, for 27 years before, the majority group tended to stand under the brand of Moderate or Municipal Reform. As to the LCC's abolition, he and, more directly, those speaking and voting in House of Commons lost the debate and the incoming First Wilson ministry chose not to reject the report and its linked, pending statute. Hayward retired on the forming of the successor council for London which saw devolved more powers and responsibility to boroughs and covered much greater territory.

In elections during his leadership Labour won a firm majority, advancing from 80 seats of 150 (for the three years from 1948) to 102 out of 151 (for the final four years).

When he died in 1974 he lived in Brockley, London SE4 and left very modest wealth, £2513.

== Notes ==
Political offices
Preceded by Lord Latham	Leader of the London County Council; 1947-1965	Succeeded by LCC abolished
Trade union offices
Preceded by Samuel Hall	General Secretary of the National Amalgamated Union of Enginemen, Firemen, Mechanics, Motormen and Electrical Workers; National Secretary of the Power Group of the Transport and General Workers' Union; 1938–1946	Succeeded by William Tudor
