= Camberwell North (London County Council constituency) =

London County Council constituency

- Former constituency for the London County Council

Former constituency
- Created: 1889
- Abolished: 1949
- Member(s): 2
- Replaced by: Peckham

Camberwell North was a constituency used for elections to the London County Council between 1889 and 1949. The seat shared boundaries with the UK Parliament constituency of the same name.

== Councillors ==
Year	Name	Party	Name	Party
1889	The Rev Hugh Boswell Chapman	Progressive	Richard Strong	Progressive
1892	James Sears	Progressive	Richard Strong	Progressive
1898	Henry Robert Taylor	Labour Progressive	Richard Strong	Progressive
1904	Henry Robert Taylor	Labour Progressive	Reginald Bray	Progressive
1919	Charles Ammon	Labour	Herbert Arthur Baker	Progressive
1922	Charles Ammon	Labour	Cecil Manning	Labour
1925	Agnes Dawson	Labour	Cecil Manning	Labour
1932	Agnes Dawson	Labour	Thomas Williams	Labour
1934	Agnes Dawson	Labour	Charles Ammon	Labour
1937	Cecil Manning	Labour	Charles Ammon	Labour
1946	Cecil Manning	Labour	Richard Samuel Griffith	Labour

== Election results ==
1889 London County Council election: Camberwell North
Party	Candidate	Votes	%	±%
Progressive	Richard Strong	1,962		
Progressive	Hugh Chapman	1,612		
Liberal Unionist	William Edward Teather	1,097		
Moderate	B. Thornton	1,071		
Independent	Edward Dresser Rogers	823		
Progressive win (new seat)				
Progressive win (new seat)				

1892 London County Council election: Camberwell North
Party	Candidate	Votes	%	±%
Progressive	Richard Strong	3,430		
Progressive	James Sears	3,420		
Moderate	William John Dixon	1,251		
Moderate	Arthur Cawston	1,249		
Progressive hold		Swing		
Progressive hold		Swing		

1895 London County Council election: Camberwell North
Party	Candidate	Votes	%	±%
Progressive	Richard Strong	3,068		
Progressive	James Sears	3,061		
Moderate	J. G. C. Minchin	1,804		
Progressive hold		Swing		
Progressive hold		Swing		

1898 London County Council election: Camberwell North
Party	Candidate	Votes	%	±%
Progressive	Richard Strong	3,477		
Progressive	Henry Robert Taylor	3,318		
Moderate	Guy Lushington	1,834		
Moderate	F. E. Anderton	1,773		
Progressive hold		Swing		
Progressive hold		Swing		

1901 London County Council election: Camberwell North
Party	Candidate	Votes	%	±%
Progressive	Richard Strong	unopposed	n/a	n/a
Progressive	Henry Robert Taylor	unopposed	n/a	n/a
Progressive hold		Swing	n/a	
Progressive hold		Swing	n/a	

1904 London County Council election: Camberwell North
Party	Candidate	Votes	%	±%
Progressive	Henry Robert Taylor	3,670		n/a
Progressive	Reginald Bray	3,563		n/a
Conservative	T. G. L. Miller	1,229		
Progressive hold		Swing	n/a	
Progressive hold		Swing	n/a	

1907 London County Council election: Camberwell North
Party	Candidate	Votes	%	±%
Progressive	Reginald Bray	5,449		
Progressive	Henry Robert Taylor	5,365		
Municipal Reform	A. Campbell	3,545		
Municipal Reform	W. Edmonds	3,472	19.2	
Majority				
Progressive hold		Swing		
Progressive hold		Swing		

1910 London County Council election: Camberwell North
Party	Candidate	Votes	%	±%
Progressive	Reginald Bray	4,355	31.1	
Progressive	Henry Robert Taylor	4,339	30.9	
Municipal Reform	W. Courtney	2,694	19.2	
Municipal Reform	P. Michael	2,633	18.8	
Majority		1,645	11.7	
Progressive hold		Swing		

1913 London County Council election: Camberwell North
Party	Candidate	Votes	%	±%
Progressive	Reginald Bray	4,358	28.2	−2.9
Progressive	Henry Robert Taylor	4,303	27.8	−3.1
Municipal Reform	William Alfred Hirst	3,423	22.1	+2.9
Municipal Reform	H. A. Truby	3,374	21.8	+3.0
Majority		880	5.7	−6.0
Progressive hold		Swing	-3.0	

1919 London County Council election: Camberwell North
Party	Candidate	Votes	%	±%
Labour	Charles Ammon	1,450	34.5	n/a
Progressive	Herbert Arthur Baker	1,021	24.3	−3.9
Municipal Reform	Henry Joseph Raiment	932	22.2	−0.1
Municipal Reform	Arthur Charles Fox-Davies	802	19.1	−2.7
Majority		89	2.1	−3.9
Progressive hold		Swing		
Labour gain from Progressive		Swing		

1922 London County Council election: Camberwell North
Party	Candidate	Votes	%	±%
Labour	Charles Ammon	4,277		
Labour	Cecil Manning	4,011		
Municipal Reform	Alexander Russell	2,152		
Municipal Reform	Helen Gwynne-Vaughan	2,137		
Progressive	Herbert Arthur Baker	1,235		
Progressive	Hugh Moulton	1,069		
Majority				
Labour gain from Progressive		Swing		
Labour hold		Swing		

1925 London County Council election: Camberwell North
Party	Candidate	Votes	%	±%
Labour	Cecil Manning	4,789		
Labour	Agnes Dawson	4,695		
Municipal Reform	W. B. Franklin	2,127		
Municipal Reform	H. W. J. Steen	2,103		
Majority				
Labour hold		Swing		
Labour hold		Swing		

1928 London County Council election: Camberwell North
Party	Candidate	Votes	%	±%
Labour	Cecil Manning	5,543		
Labour	Agnes Dawson	5,432		
Municipal Reform	J. Bussé	2,049		
Municipal Reform	R. A. Cary	2,023		
Majority				
Labour hold		Swing		
Labour hold		Swing		

1931 London County Council election: Camberwell North
Party	Candidate	Votes	%	±%
Labour	Cecil Manning	3,474		
Labour	Agnes Dawson	3,282		
Municipal Reform	A. Capewell	1,487		
Municipal Reform	R. Etherton	1,452		
Independent	H. J. Edwards	816		
Majority				
Labour hold		Swing		
Labour hold		Swing		

Camberwell North by-election, 1932
Party	Candidate	Votes	%	±%
Labour	Thomas Williams			
Municipal Reform	P. C. Baker			
Majority				
Labour hold		Swing		

1934 London County Council election: Camberwell North
Party	Candidate	Votes	%	±%
Labour	Agnes Dawson	6,815		
Labour	Thomas Williams	6,757		
Municipal Reform	Grace Bateman	2,090		
Municipal Reform	Arthur Bateman	2,078		
Majority				
Labour hold		Swing		
Labour hold		Swing		

Camberwell North by-election, 1934
Party	Candidate	Votes	%	±%
Labour	Charles Ammon	Unopposed	N/A	N/A
Labour hold		Swing		

1937 London County Council election: Camberwell North
Party	Candidate	Votes	%	±%
Labour	Charles Ammon	6,431		
Labour	Cecil Manning	5,993		
Municipal Reform	P. Baker	2,583		
Municipal Reform	N. Lloyd	2,453		
Majority				
Labour hold		Swing		
Labour hold		Swing		

1946 London County Council election: Camberwell North
Party	Candidate	Votes	%	±%
Labour	Cecil Manning	2,705		
Labour	Richard Samuel Griffith	2,536		
British People's Party	W. G. Stubbs	257		
British People's Party	A. E. Egan	233		
Majority				
Labour hold		Swing		
Labour hold		Swing		
