= 1920 Camberwell North West by-election =

UK parliamentary by-election

- 31 March 1920

Constituency of Camberwell North West

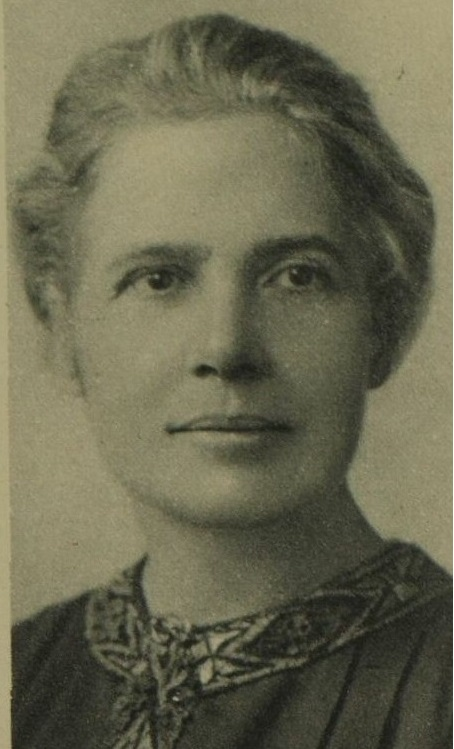
| | | | Lib |
| Candidate | Thomas Macnamara | Susan Lawrence | John Carroll |
| Party | National Liberal | Labour | Liberal |
| Popular vote | 6,618 | 4,733 | 3,386 |
| Percentage | 44.9% | 32.1% | 23.0% |
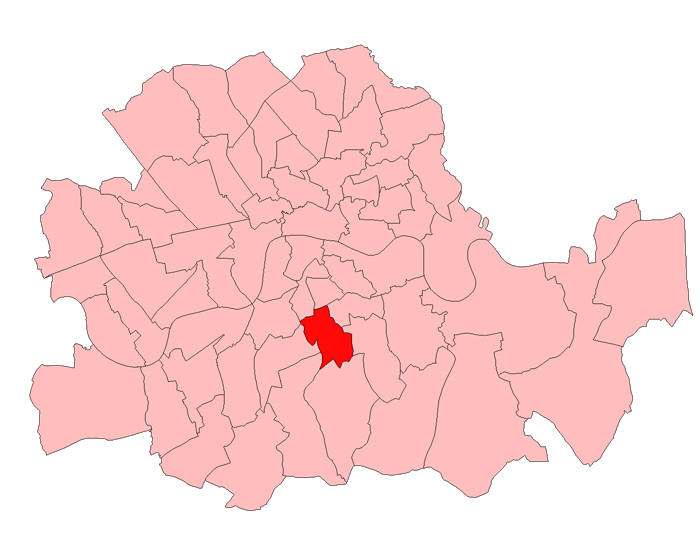
- A map of parliamentary constituencies within the County of London at the time of the by-election, with Camberwell North West highlighted in red.
MP before election
Thomas Macnamara
National Liberal
Subsequent MP
Thomas Macnamara
National Liberal

The 1920 Camberwell North West by-election was a parliamentary by-election held for the British House of Commons constituency of Camberwell North West in the South London district of Camberwell on 31 March 1920.

== Vacancy ==
The by-election was caused by the appointment of the sitting Coalition Liberal Member of Parliament, Thomas Macnamara as Minister of Labour. Until the passing of the Re-election of Ministers Act, 1919, MPs who were appointed to certain ministerial and other offices more than nine months after a proclamation summoning a new Parliament were required to seek re-election to the House of Commons.

== Electoral history ==
The North West division of Camberwell was created for the 1918 general election and gave Camberwell an additional member. It comprised three wards from the old Camberwell North seat, which was Liberal and two wards from Dulwich which had previously been Unionist. Macnamara had switched to the new seat in 1918 when, as a close associate of David Lloyd George he was a recipient of the Coalition Coupon. There is some dispute over the status of his opponent at that election, the Conservative Guy Radford. According to The Times newspaper, Radford, who had fought the seat of Chesterfield at the general elections of January and December 1910 was described as an unofficial Unionist. However another source indicates that Radford had been Conservative candidate in Camberwell since 1911 and that he was not only formally adopted by the local Conservatives to contest the general election against Macnamara but that he too had been granted the Coalition coupon. This however conflicts with his statement at the time of the 1918 general election when Radford told The Times special correspondent that he had received a telegram from the Conservative agent for the London area, William Hayes Fisher which read “Greatly deplore paramount necessities of Coalition arrangements prevent your inclusion in the list of official candidates.” The article concludes that it was Macnamara who received the Coupon and that Radford did not. Whatever the actual situation, Macnamara’s close connection to the prime minister, with his reputation as the Man Who Won the War, trumped whatever local or national credentials Radford possessed and Macnamara won in 1918 with 64% of the poll.

T. J. Macnamara

1918 general election: Camberwell North West
| Party | | Candidate | Votes | % | ±% |
|---|---|---|---|---|---|
| C | Liberal | Thomas James Macnamara | 6,986 | 63.9 | |
| | Unionist | Walter Guy Wulf Radford | 3,947 | 36.1 | |
| Majority | | | 3,039 | 27.8 | |
| Turnout | | | 10,933 | 36.5 | |
| | Liberal win (new seat) | | | | |
C indicates candidate endorsed by the coalition government.

== Candidates ==
- Macnamara was duly nominated to seek re-election as the pro-government Liberal candidate in the by-election caused by his appointment to the Cabinet as Minister of Labour. Macnamara had sat as MP for Camberwell North between 1900 and 1918.
- As Coalition partners with the Lloyd George Liberals, the Tories did not oppose Macnamara at the by-election, although a split in the local Conservative ranks meant that for a time it was thought possible one section of Tory support might rally behind a local candidate, very possibly Guy Radford.
- The split in the Liberal Party which occurred when Lloyd George replaced H H Asquith as prime minister in December 1916 had resulted on many occasions in candidates from the different sides of the Liberal divide fighting each other. Macnamara did not have an Aquisthian Liberal opponent at the 1918 general election but the Wee Frees, as the Asquithian Liberals were known colloquially by analogy with the small, strict Scottish Presbyterian sect, did bring forward a candidate to face Macnamara this time. Macnamara’s association with the Coalition had not been universally welcomed by Camberwell Liberals but they had stuck with him in 1918. They were not pleased however by Macnamara’s intervention on behalf of the Coalition candidate against the Asquithian former cabinet minister Sir John Simon at the Spen Valley by-election in December 1919 when Simon might have won the seat in a straight fight against Labour. The Camberwell Liberals passed a resolution informing Macnamara they no longer regarded him as their representative and they soon selected John Charles Carroll, a builder and contractor at Leyton, Chairman of the London Junior Liberal Association and president of the West Ham Liberals as prospective candidate in his place. Buoyed by the victory of Asquith in the Paisley by-election on 12 February 1920, Camberwell Liberals duly adopted Carroll as the official party candidate when the by-election was called.
- There was no tradition of candidates representing the Labour movement in any of the Camberwell seats between 1885 and 1918. But the change in the social and political landscape brought about by the First World War, the extension of the franchise and the resulting mass democracy, meant Labour were contesting ever greater numbers of seats with each passing election. It was reported on 15 March 1920 that the Labour Party was expected to fight hard to keep Dr Macnamara from re-gaining his seat. At that time, Labour were considering putting forward the mayor of Camberwell, Cllr J D Spradbrow, as their candidate. Very soon afterwards however, it emerged that the Labour candidate would be Susan Lawrence, the former Municipal Reform or Conservative member of the London County Council turned socialist. Miss Lawrence was aged 48 and one of the Labour Party’s leading female members with a distinguished career in local government for Labour in Poplar.

== Campaign ==
The writ for the by-election was issued in Parliament on 22 March and polling day was set for 31 March. Nominations closed to confirm that the election would be a three-way contest.

The chief issue in the election was the performance and record of the Coalition government. The Times reported that support for the Coalition was crumbling in the country but although the opposition parties had made gains from the Coalition in by-elections since 1918 most government defences of their seats had been successful. Even The Times conceded too that Dr Macnamara had formidable electioneering experience. Macnamara and Carroll both issued election addresses on 23 March, Macnamara defending the government’s record and promising that the Coalition was doing all it could to keep the cost of living down, increase housing provision and restore the economy after the great expenses of the war. He also attacked the socialism and syndicalism of the Labour Party with great rhetorical flourish. In this he may have been influenced by the behaviour Labour supporters at one of his public meetings on 26 March who rushed in and howled him down attempting to disrupt the event. It was vital to Macnamara not just to retain his traditional Liberal support but also to keep the Unionist vote solidly on his side. It was important to him therefore that he received a letter of support signed by both the prime minister and by Tory leader Bonar Law in which what was described as his “close acquaintance and warm sympathy” with organised labour was highlighted. This was not simply to endorse his appointment as Minister of Labour but presumably to make a useful electoral appeal to Labour supporters. This may have been a canny move as Macnamara always regarded Labour as his principal opposition and, like Lloyd George, was keen to play up the socialist or Bolshevik menace he alleged was lurking behind the apparently moderate skirts of Miss Lawrence.

Carroll lost no time in attacking Macnamara and the Coalition. He claimed Macnamara had ceased to be a Liberal and stated his belief that the public were disgusted with the Coalition's lack of principle and policy. He said its record was lamentable and barren. The Coalition's 1918 programme was, he declared, a deception. He came out in favour of a levy on capital wealth, Home Rule for Ireland within the Empire, cooperation in industry and temperance reform.

Miss Lawrence was perhaps hoping for a boost from an electorate of whom half were women. It was reported however that women voters still seemed reluctant to return women to Parliament, although to be fair they had so far had little opportunity. Of the 17 women candidates who were nominated at the 1918 general election only one, Constance Markievicz of Sinn Féin, was returned and ironically she was one who did not wish to take up her seat. The only woman to take up her seat so far had been Nancy Astor who won the Plymouth Sutton by-election in 1919 and no other woman had stood at a by –election since 1918. It was nevertheless acknowledged that little was known at that time of the psephology of the women’s vote and there was speculation that it might after all prove decisive in Camberwell. Miss Lawrence did not however have the reputation of being an effective platform performer which was held as a factor against her. She too led on the high cost of living and she and her supporters tried to paint the Labour Party as the party of the future with the Coalition as belonging to the past.

It was expected to be a tightly fought and close contest all round with dozens of political meetings scheduled, many outside speakers and party workers for all three candidates coming to help from all over London. There were also motor and bicycle processions as well as a profusion of placards, hoardings and posters.

== Result ==
Macnamara retained the seat for the government with a majority of 1,885 votes, down from one of 3,039 votes at the general election. However this contest was three-cornered rather than the straight fight he had had in 1918. Despite all the hullaballoo of the campaign and the press focus on the significance of the election, the turnout was only 47.9%.

Camberwell North West, 1920
| Party | Candidate | Votes | % | ±% |
|---|---|---|---|---|
| National Liberal | Thomas James Macnamara | 6,618 | 44.9 | −19.0 |
| Labour | Susan Lawrence | 4,733 | 32.1 | New |
| Liberal | John Charles Carroll | 3,386 | 23.0 | −40.9 |
| Majority | | 1,885 | 12.8 | N/A |
| Turnout | | 14,737 | 47.9 | +11.4 |
| National Liberal hold | | Swing | | |

Macnamara in his victory speech praised the electorate for understanding that the government had a massive task on its hands in the aftermath of the war but promised to take grievances against government policy more seriously in the future and try to explain the government position more clearly. He also hailed a victory against the forces of socialism. His win, he declared, “showed that the people were not going to hand over the fate of the country to hot-air artists at the street corners.”

== Aftermath ==
Macnamara's days as the local MP were however numbered. He held the seat at the 1922 general election standing as a Lloyd George National Liberal in a three-cornered contest with Labour and the official Liberals.

1922 general election: Camberwell North West
| Party | Candidate | Votes | % | ±% |
|---|---|---|---|---|
| National Liberal | Thomas James Macnamara | 8,339 | 49.6 | +4.7 |
| Labour | Hyacinth Morgan | 5,182 | 30.9 | −1.2 |
| Liberal | John Hobbis Harris | 3,270 | 19.5 | −3.5 |
| Majority | | 3,157 | 18.7 | +5.9 |
| Turnout | | 16,791 | 63.8 | +15.9 |
| National Liberal hold | | Swing | +3.0 | |

In 1923, now fighting as a Liberal without prefix or suffix, he just held on with a majority of 80 votes over Labour with the Conservatives also back in the fight. At the 1924 general election however he was finally ousted with the Tories taking the seat. Camberwell North West then became a Conservative-Labour marginal until its abolition in 1950. He later tried to get back into Parliament as Liberal candidate in Walsall but without success. Carroll was twice subsequently an unsuccessful Parliamentary candidate for the Liberals, at North Lanarkshire in 1922 and West Ham, Upton in 1923. Miss Lawrence was however more successful. She served as MP for East Ham North on two occasions and in 1929 succeeded Herbert Morrison as Chair of the Labour Party.

== See also ==
- List of United Kingdom by-elections
- United Kingdom by-election records
