= Cecil Manning =

British politician

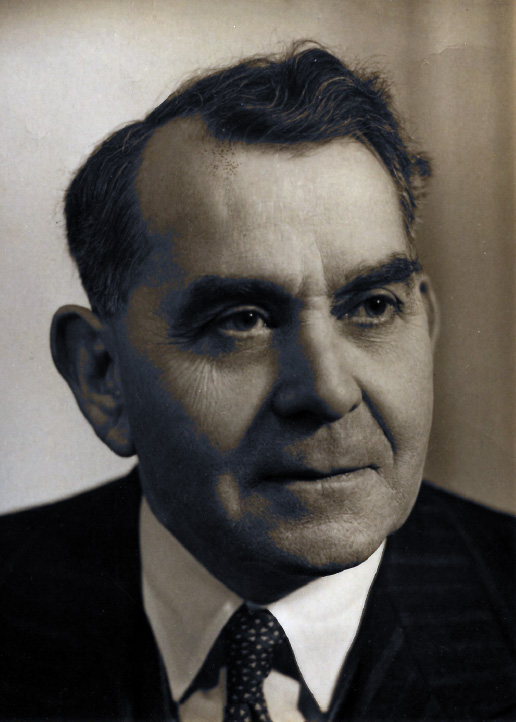
Cecil Aubrey Gwynne Manning (23 May 1892 – 12 April 1985)

Cecil Aubrey Gwynne Manning (23 May 1892 – 12 April 1985) was a British Labour Party politician.

Having fought with the London Regiment in France in the First World War, Manning was wounded and lost his right arm.

After the war he entered local government in London: he was a member of Wandsworth Borough Council from 1919 to 1922, and was elected to the London County Council in 1922, representing Camberwell North, serving as leader of the opposition in 1929-30 and deputy chairman from 1930 to 1931. He retired from the county council in 1932, having been elected a member of Camberwell Borough Council in the previous year. He remained a member of the borough council until 1953, and was Mayor of Camberwell for the final two years of his membership. In 1937 he returned to the county council, remaining a member until 1950, representing Camberwell North again, and then Peckham for the final year.

During the Second World War he took an active part in the defence of the capital in the ARP and Civil Defence organisations, and was Invasion Defence Controller for Camberwell in 1939–44.

In 1944 he was elected to the House of Commons at a by-election as Member of Parliament for Camberwell North. He held the seat until 1950.

He moved to Somerset, where he was a member Shepton Mallet Urban District Council from 1954 to 1968, serving as chairman in 1967–68.

Parliament of the United Kingdom
Preceded by Charles Ammon	Member of Parliament for Camberwell North; 1944–1950	constituency abolished
Party political offices
Preceded by Herbert Morrison	Leader of the Labour Party on London County Council; 1929–1930	Succeeded by Lewis Silkin
Civic offices
Preceded by Charles Ammon	Mayor of Camberwell; 1951–1953	Succeeded by Rosina Whyatt
