= Henry Newton Knights =

British politician

Henry Newton Knights MBE

Member of Parliament for Camberwell North
- In office 14 December 1918 – 9 January 1922
- Preceded by: Thomas James Macnamara
- Succeeded by: Charles Ammon

Personal details
- Born: 1872
- Died: 31 October 1959 Morden College, Blackheath, London, England
- Party: Conservative

Henry Newton Knights MBE (1872 – 31 October 1959) was a British businessman and Conservative Party politician.

== Business ==
Knights, a resident of Dulwich in south east London, started an engineering business in 1908. In 1911 he purchased the Astbury Engineering Works, Peckham, as a going concern. During the First World War he manufactured Stokes bombs for the British Army. He was also active in the Volunteer Force, the home defence organisation, holding the rank of captain. He was awarded the MBE in the 1918 Birthday Honours. In 1918 he was one of the founding directors of the British And South African Insurance Corporation. In the following year the new company merged with the British and Australasian Insurance Company to form the Greater Britain Insurance Corporation, with Newton Knights as chairman. He resigned in March 1921.

== Local politics ==
He entered local politics, and was elected to Camberwell Borough Council as a member of the Conservative-backed Municipal Reform Party. He was mayor of Camberwell in 1913–1914.

He was co-opted on 15 October 1918 onto the London County Council by the Municipal Reform party to represent the Dulwich division of the Borough of Camberwell.

He held the office of Sheriff of the City of London in 1920 – 1921.

== Member of Parliament ==
He was elected as a Coalition Conservative Member of Parliament (MP) for Camberwell North at the 1918 general election.

== Illness and bankruptcy ==
In April 1921 his family issued an appeal for information on his whereabouts when he failed to return from a visit to Folkestone a week earlier. He was eventually discovered a week later on a roadside between Dymchurch and Hythe, having suffered a nervous breakdown and unable to give any account of his movements. Admitted to a Kent nursing home, he resigned as sheriff a month later. In June 1921 he informed the North Camberwell Unionist Association that he would not be fit to stand as a parliamentary candidate at future elections. In July 1921 he was judged bankrupt and it emerged in court that £10,000 excess profits duty had been charged against his business, and that he owed £56,000 to creditors while having assets of only £3,150. Newton Knights explained that much of the loss could be attributed to his unsuccessful speculation on the metal exchange. He had also not been able to pay for the hire of the state coach while serving as sheriff of the city. As an undischarged bankrupt, Newton Knights was ineligible to sit in the Commons, and resigned his seat on 9 January 1922 through appointment as Steward of the Chiltern Hundreds.

== Death ==
He died at Morden College, Blackheath in October 1959 aged 87, and was cremated at Eltham Crematorium.

Parliament of the United Kingdom
Preceded by Thomas Macnamara	Member of Parliament for Camberwell North; 1918–1922	Succeeded by Charles Ammon
