= William Minet =

British philanthropist

William Minet (1851–1933) was a British landowner and philanthropist, of Huguenot descent.

== Early life ==
He was the son of James Lewis Minet (1807–1885) and Elizabeth Iggulden, and a descendant of Isaac Minet (1660–1745), a Huguenot, who left France after the 1685 Revocation of the Edict of Nantes to settle in London, and his grandson Hughes Minet (1731–1813).

== Career ==
Minet donated the 14½ acres that became London's Myatt's Fields Park in 1890.

In 1889 Minet became a founding member of the Huguenot Society and served as President from 1905 to 1908. His collection of archive records relating to the Huguenot community part of the Huguenot Society Library at University College London.

Minet paid for the construction of the Minet Library, which was built in 1890, and housed Lambeth Archives until they moved to a purpose-built facility in 2024.

In 1900, he bought Hadham Hall in Essex (later sold, in 1948).

== Personal life ==
His first wife was Alice Evans (1856–1887), the eldest daughter of Sir John Evans, the archaeologist and geologist.

They had a daughter Susan (1884–1976), who inherited the family properties in Hayes and Camberwell, and the estate was administered from the Minet Estate Office in Brixton. On her death, the properties were inherited by a distant cousin, Peter Briffault Minet, and since his death in 1992, the remaining properties have been run by a charitable trust, the Minet Trust.

His second wife was Mary Rayner.
