= Henry Robert Taylor =

British politician

Taylor in 1898

Henry Robert Taylor was a British politician.

Taylor worked as a bricklayer and became active in the Operative Bricklayers' Society. In the early 1890s, he was elected to sit on the London Trades Council, and then in 1892 he was appointed as an alderman on London County Council.

While on the council, Taylor stopped working as a bricklayer, spending his time on the Health Public Control Works committee, and the Technical Education Board. At the 1898 London County Council election, he was elected to serve as a councillor for Camberwell North, but became increasingly associated with the right-wing. In the late 1900s, he put his name to a list of measures proposed by the Municipal Reform Party, but he nonetheless remained part of the Progressive Party group on the council until he stood down in 1919.

Taylor also served on Camberwell Metropolitan Borough Council and in 1903/04 was Mayor of Camberwell.

Civic offices
Preceded by Charles Clarke	Mayor of Camberwell; 1903–1904	Succeeded by Joseph Russell Tomkins
