= Edward Hodson Bayley =

British businessman and politician

Edward Hodson Bayley (1841 – 7 March 1938) was a British businessman and Liberal Party politician.

== Early life ==
Born in Accrington, Lancashire, he was the second son of the Reverend Dr Johnathon Bayley, a pastor with the Swedenborgian New Church and his wife Lydia née Hodson. He was educated in England, France and Germany.

== Business Interests ==
He moved to the south east suburbs of London and established E H Bayley & Co., waggon builders, at Newington Causeway. In 1892 he was described as a "wheelwright and fire escape manufacturer". He was also the chairman of three other transport-related businesses: the West Metropolitan Tramways Company, the London Improved Cab Company and of the United Horseshoe and Nail Company. He also sat on the London board of the Equitable Life Assurance Society of the United States. His first wife was Hannah Moore, daughter of Denis Moore and Grace Walker. After her death 1880, Bayley founded the New Church Orphanage in her memory. His second wife was an American woman, Josephine Eva Simon.

== Political career ==
Bayley was active in the Liberal Party, and in 1886 was chosen to contest the Camberwell North constituency, defending the seat of the retiring member of parliament, Richard Strong. He described himself as a "thorough Home Ruler" and a supporter of William Gladstone. Bayley had two opponents: John Richards Kelly of the Conservative Party and William Pirie Duff, described as a "Dissentient Liberal". Bayley was defeated, with Kelly gaining the seat with a majority of 365 votes.

Despite his defeat, Bayley was unanimously readopted as prospective parliamentary candidate by the North Camberwell Liberal and Radical Association in March 1887. The next general election was held in 1892, and he faced a straight fight against the incumbent, Kelly. A major issue in the election was the proposed extension of tramways over Westminster Bridge: Bayley was strongly in favour of bringing the tramlines into south London, but Kelly was opposed. Bayley easily won the seat, with a majority of 845 votes over Kelly.

In the following year Bayley was involved in a curious court case, having refused to pay the painter of his official portrait in House of Commons. Bayley claimed that it was a poor likeness, and "only like him in the tie", while his wife objected to it as it did not make him look "intellectual" enough. The court found against Bayley.

He was active in Parliamentary debates, questioning Government ministers on topics as varied as the state of Gibraltar, lifeboat services, and conditions of industrial workers. In 1894, he raised the question of the "great lack of school accommodation in Camberwell", his constituency.

In June 1895 the Liberal government led by Lord Rosebery lost a vote of confidence. A general election was duly called, and Bayley defended his seat against a new Conservative candidate, Major Philip Dalbiac. A third candidate, Nelson Palmer, subsequently entered the contest, claiming to be "independent of party", but representing the labouring classes. The Conservatives secured a large majority at the election, and Bayley was one of many Liberal MPs to lose their seats. Dalbiac secured a majority of 693 votes over Bayley. Palmer's intervention had no effect, as he received only 32 votes.

== Later life ==
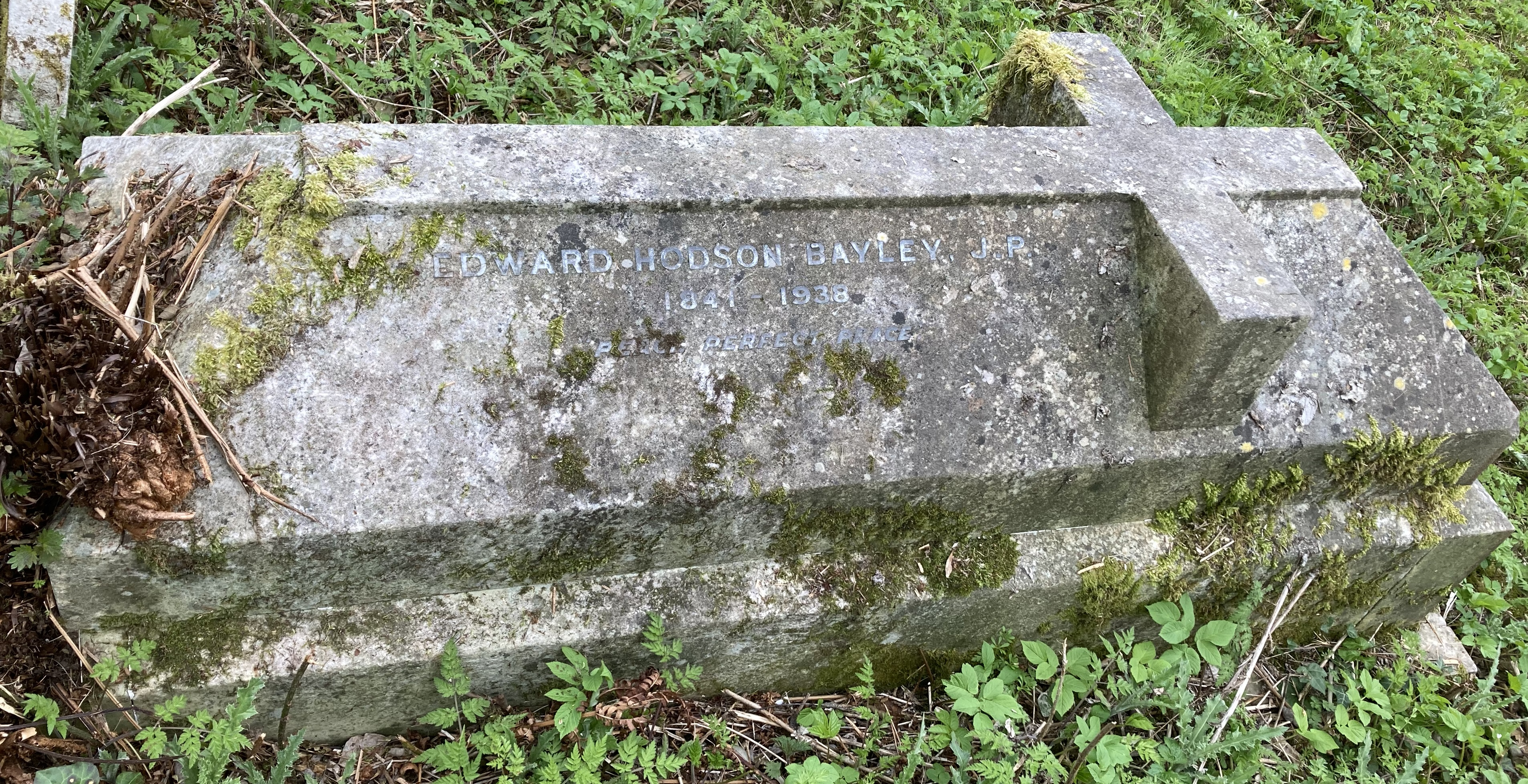
Grave of Edward Hodson Bayley in Highgate Cemetery

Bayley continued to hold directorships in various transport businesses, although the United Horseshoe and Nail Company was wound up in 1909. He was chairman of the London Road Car Company and was a director of the Premier Omnibus Company.

He died at Peacehaven, Sussex in March 1938 aged 96, and was buried in Highgate Cemetery.

Parliament of the United Kingdom
Preceded by John Richards Kelly	Member of Parliament for Camberwell North; 1892 – 1895	Succeeded by Philip Dalbiac
