= John Richards Kelly =

British barrister and politician

John Richards Kelly (28 February 1844 – 20 July 1922) was a British barrister and Conservative Party politician.

He was the second son of Frederic Festus Kelly of Chessington, Surrey and his wife Harriet née Richards. At the time of his birth his father was the Inspector of Letter Carriers for the General Post Office. He was also in charge of producing the Post Office Directory which he subsequently refounded as a private publication.

John attended Eton College and went up to Trinity Hall, Cambridge in 1862 from where he graduated with a B.A. in 1870. In the same year he began studying law at the Inner Temple and was called to the bar in 1878. He practiced on the South Eastern Circuit. He worked for a time as a Law Times reporter in the High Court of Justice. In 1879 he married his cousin, Fanny Lydia Kelly. In 1883 he inherited his father's interests in Kelly's Directories Ltd., and became a director of the company. His nephew was the painter Sir Gerald Kelly.

In 1886, he was selected as Conservative Party candidate to contest the constituency of Camberwell North at the general election. His elder brother was well known in the area as vicar of Camberwell, and Kelly benefited from a split in the Liberal Party over Irish Home Rule, with two rival Liberal candidates in the field. He succeeded in winning the seat for the Conservatives, but proved to be unpopular with a section of his own party, and it came as little surprise when he was defeated at the next general election in 1892. He did not stand for Parliament again.

He died at his home in Worplesdon, Surrey in July 1922 aged 78.

Parliament of the United Kingdom
Preceded by Richard Strong	Member of Parliament for Camberwell North; 1886 – 1892	Succeeded by Edward Hodson Bayley
