= Camberwell North West =

Parliamentary constituency in the United Kingdom, 1918–1950

- Former borough constituency for the House of Commons
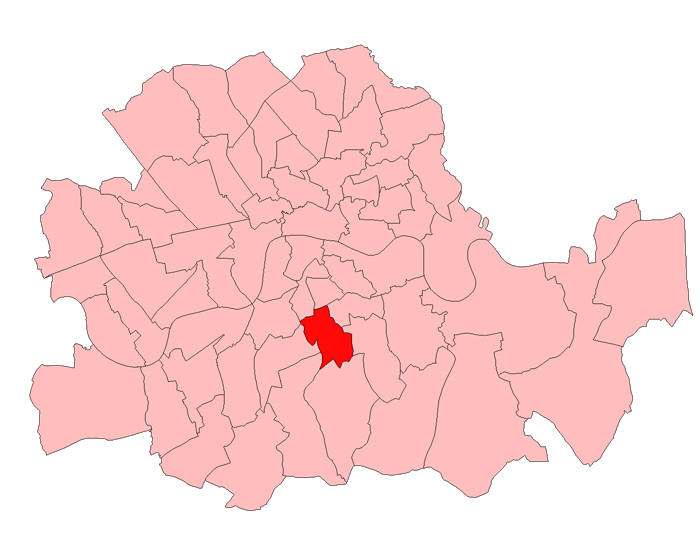
- Camberwell North West in London 1918–50
- County: County of London

1918–1950
- Seats: One
- Created from: Camberwell North and Dulwich
- Replaced by: Peckham and Dulwich

Camberwell North West was a borough constituency located in the Metropolitan Borough of Camberwell, in South London. It returned one Member of Parliament (MP) to the House of Commons of the Parliament of the United Kingdom, elected by the first-past-the-post voting system.

The constituency was created for the 1918 general election, and abolished for the 1950 general election.

== Boundaries ==

The Metropolitan Borough of Camberwell wards of Addington, Lyndhurst, St Giles, Town Hall, and West.

== Members of Parliament ==
| Election | Member | Party |
|---|---|---|
| 1918 | Thomas Macnamara | Coalition Liberal |
| 1922 | Thomas Macnamara | National Liberal |
| 1923 | Thomas Macnamara | Liberal |
| 1924 | Edward Campbell | Unionist |
| 1929 | Hyacinth Morgan | Labour |
| 1931 | James Cassels | Conservative |
| 1935 | Oscar Guest | Conservative |
| 1945 | Freda Corbet | Labour |
| 1950 | constituency abolished | |

== Election results ==
=== Election in the 1910s ===
T.J. Macnamara

General election 1918: Camberwell North West
| Party | | Candidate | Votes | % |
|---|---|---|---|---|
| C | National Liberal | Thomas Macnamara | 6,986 | 63.9 |
| | Unionist | Walter Guy Wulf Radford | 3,947 | 36.1 |
| Majority | | | 3,039 | 27.8 |
| Turnout | | | 10,933 | 36.5 |
| | National Liberal win (new seat) | | | |
C indicates candidate endorsed by the coalition government.

=== Election in the 1920s ===
T.J. Macnamara

1920 Camberwell North West by-election
| Party | Candidate | Votes | % | ±% |
|---|---|---|---|---|
| National Liberal | Thomas Macnamara | 6,618 | 44.9 | –19.0 |
| Labour | Susan Lawrence | 4,733 | 32.1 | New |
| Liberal | John Charles Carroll | 3,386 | 23.0 | New |
| Majority | | 1,885 | 12.8 | −15.0 |
| Turnout | | 14,737 | 47.9 | +11.4 |
| National Liberal hold | | Swing | | |

Hobbis Harris

General election 1922: Camberwell North West
| Party | Candidate | Votes | % | ±% |
|---|---|---|---|---|
| National Liberal | Thomas Macnamara | 8,339 | 49.6 | +4.7 |
| Labour | Hyacinth Morgan | 5,182 | 30.9 | –1.2 |
| Liberal | John Harris | 3,270 | 19.5 | –3.5 |
| Majority | | 3,157 | 18.7 | +5.9 |
| Turnout | | 16,791 | 63.8 | +15.9 |
| National Liberal hold | | Swing | +3.0 | |

General election 1923: Camberwell North West
| Party | Candidate | Votes | % | ±% |
|---|---|---|---|---|
| Liberal | Thomas Macnamara | 6,843 | 34.8 | +15.3 |
| Labour | Hyacinth Morgan | 6,763 | 34.4 | +3.5 |
| Unionist | Edward Campbell | 6,045 | 30.8 | New |
| Majority | | 80 | 0.4 | −18.3 |
| Turnout | | 19,651 | 61.9 | −1.9 |
| Liberal hold | | Swing | | |

General election 1924: Camberwell North West
| Party | Candidate | Votes | % | ±% |
|---|---|---|---|---|
| Unionist | Edward Campbell | 9,626 | 39.8 | +9.0 |
| Labour | Hyacinth Morgan | 9,432 | 39.0 | +4.6 |
| Liberal | Thomas Macnamara | 5,138 | 21.2 | −13.6 |
| Majority | | 194 | 0.8 | N/A |
| Turnout | | 24,196 | 74.8 | +12.9 |
| Unionist gain from Liberal | | Swing | | |

General election 1929: Camberwell North-West
| Party | Candidate | Votes | % | ±% |
|---|---|---|---|---|
| Labour | Hyacinth Morgan | 12,213 | 44.2 | +5.2 |
| Unionist | Edward Campbell | 9,808 | 35.6 | −4.2 |
| Liberal | Henry Harcourt | 5,559 | 20.2 | −1.0 |
| Majority | | 2,405 | 8.6 | N/A |
| Turnout | | 27,580 | | |
| Labour gain from Unionist | | Swing | +4.7 | |

=== Election in the 1930s ===
General election 1931: Camberwell North West
| Party | Candidate | Votes | % | ±% |
|---|---|---|---|---|
| Conservative | James Cassels | 17,581 | 66.9 | +31.3 |
| Labour | Hector Hughes | 8,693 | 33.1 | −11.1 |
| Majority | | 8,888 | 33.8 | N/A |
| Turnout | | 26,274 | 63.8 | |
| Conservative gain from Labour | | Swing | +21.3 | |

General election 1935: Camberwell North West
| Party | Candidate | Votes | % | ±% |
|---|---|---|---|---|
| Conservative | Oscar Guest | 11,744 | 48.6 | −18.3 |
| Labour | Hector Hughes | 10,931 | 45.3 | +12.2 |
| Liberal | Henry James Edwards | 1,462 | 6.1 | New |
| Majority | | 813 | 3.3 | −30.5 |
| Turnout | | 24,137 | 59.3 | −4.5 |
| Conservative hold | | Swing | -15.2 | |

=== Election in the 1940s ===
General election 1945: Camberwell North West
| Party | Candidate | Votes | % | ±% |
|---|---|---|---|---|
| Labour | Freda Corbet | 12,251 | 69.6 | +24.3 |
| Conservative | L. Avon May | 5,346 | 30.4 | −18.2 |
| Majority | | 6,905 | 39.2 | N/A |
| Turnout | | 17,597 | 65.2 | +5.9 |
| Labour gain from Conservative | | Swing | +21.2 | |

Freda Corbet's election necessitated the passing of an Act of Parliament to validate her election, as she held office as an assessor under section 6 of the National Service (Armed Forces) Act, 1939 and was therefore incapable of being elected.

== See also ==
- Camberwell North (UK Parliament constituency)
- Metropolitan Borough of Camberwell
