= Philip Dalbiac =

British politician

Dalbiac in 1895.

Philip Hugh Dalbiac CB TD (20 September 1856 – 28 April 1927) was a British army officer, publisher, author and Conservative Party politician.

== Early life ==
He was the third son of Henry Eardley Aylmer Dalbiac of Durrington, West Sussex and his wife, Mary Mainwaring, daughter of Sir Henry Mainwaring, 1st Baronet. Following education at Winchester College he was commissioned as a Second Lieutenant in the 70th (Surrey) Regiment of Foot in 1875, but exchanged to the 45th (Nottinghamshire) Regiment of Foot in the same year. He was promoted to lieutenant in 1879. The 45th Foot became the 1st Battalion of the Sherwood Foresters in 1881, and he was promoted to captain in 1883. He retired from the successor regiment, with the rank of major in 1890.

== Political career ==
In June 1895 the Liberal government led by Lord Rosebery lost a vote of confidence. A general election was duly called, and Dalbiac was chosen by the Conservatives to contest the constituency of Camberwell North, which was held the Liberal Party member of parliament, Edward Hodson Bayley. A third candidate, Nelson Palmer, subsequently entered the contest, claiming to be of "independent of party", but representing the labouring classes. The Conservatives secured a large majority at the election, and Bayley was one of many Liberal MPs to lose their seats. Dalbiac secured a majority of 693 votes over Bayley. Palmer's intervention had no effect, as he received only 32 votes. Dalbiac only served one term in the House of Commons, choosing to step down at the next election in 1900.

Although no longer a regular army officer, Dalbiac served in the part-time Volunteer Force, joining the 18th Middlesex Rifle Volunteers (Paddington Rifles) in 1891, and was the commanding officer of the unit from 1896 to 1908. When the volunteers were reorganised as the Territorial Force in 1908, Dalbiac was given command of the 2nd London Divisional Transport and Supply Column, with the honorary rank of colonel. He was awarded the Territorial Decoration in 1911 and made a Companion of the Bath in the coronation honours of the same year.

Dalbiac resigned his commission in 1912 but with the outbreak of the First World War in 1914 returned to the army and formed a second line duplicate of the supply column for the new 60th Division. He travelled with the new unit to Salonika, and was mentioned in dispatches. A partner in the publishing company of Swan Sommenschein & Co., he became a director of George Allen & Unwin Limited in 1914.

== Personal life ==
Dalbiac married Lillian Seely, fourth daughter of Sir Charles Seely of Brooke House, Isle of Wight, in 1888. They lived in Tooting Common, South London. They had two sons and four daughters. His younger son, Charles James Shelley Dalbiac (1896–1915), was killed in action in the First World War. Sir John Henry D'Albiac (who added the apostrophe back to the French surname) was his nephew.

Dalbiac died at Freshwater, Isle of Wight in 1927, aged 72.

== Publications ==
Dalbiac wrote a history of his former regiment, the 45th Foot, and a description of the war service of the 60th Division, which was published posthumously. He also worked on two dictionaries of quotations.

- Dalbiac, Philip Hugh (1902). History of the 45th: 1st Nottinghamshire Regiment (Sherwood Foresters). London: Swan Sommenschein & Co.
- Dalbiac, P.H. (1908). Dictionary of Quotations (English). London: Swan Sommenschein & Co.
- Dalbiac, P.H.; Thomas Benfield Harbotle (1909). Dictionary of Quotations (French & Italian). London: Swan Sommenschein & Co.
- Dalbiac, P.H. (1927). History of the 60th Division (2/2nd London Division). London: George Allen & Unwin.

Parliament of the United Kingdom
| Preceded by Edward Hodson Bayley | Member of Parliament for Camberwell North; 1895–1900 | Succeeded by Thomas Macnamara |
