= Charles Ammon, 1st Baron Ammon =

British politician (1873–1960)

The Right Honourable The Lord Ammon PC DL JP
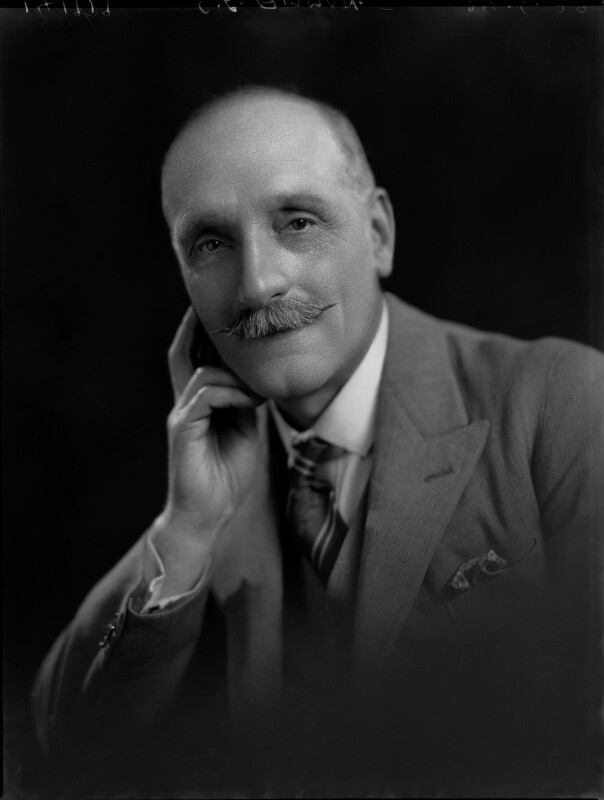
- Charles Ammon in 1929, by Lafayette

Chief Whip of the House of Lords Captain of the Honourable Corps of Gentlemen-at-Arms
- In office 4 August 1945 – 18 October 1949
- Prime Minister: Clement Attlee
- Preceded by: The Earl Fortescue
- Succeeded by: The Lord Shepherd

Parliamentary and Financial Secretary to the Admiralty
- In office 11 June 1929 – 24 August 1931
- Prime Minister: Ramsay MacDonald
- Preceded by: Cuthbert Headlam
- Succeeded by: The Earl Stanhope
- In office 23 January 1924 – 4 November 1924
- Prime Minister: Ramsay MacDonald
- Preceded by: Archibald Boyd-Carpenter
- Succeeded by: J. C. C. Davidson

Member of the House of Lords Lord Temporal
- In office 31 January 1944 – 2 April 1960; Hereditary Peerage
- Preceded by: Peerage created
- Succeeded by: Peerage extinct

Member of Parliament for Camberwell North
- In office 14 November 1935 – 30 January 1944
- Preceded by: Arthur Bateman
- Succeeded by: Cecil Manning
- In office 20 February 1922 – 7 October 1931
- Preceded by: Henry Newton Knights
- Succeeded by: Arthur Bateman

Personal details
- Born: 22 April 1873
- Died: 2 April 1960 (aged 86)
- Party: Labour

Charles George Ammon, 1st Baron Ammon (22 April 1873 – 2 April 1960) was a British Labour Party politician.

== Background and education ==
The son of Charles George and Mary Ammon, he was educated at state schools. He was active in the Independent Labour Party and was a conscientious objector in the First World War, becoming chief lobbyist at Parliament for the No-Conscription Fellowship.

== Career ==
Ammon worked with the Post Office for twenty-four years. He became active in the Fawcett Association, and was then secretary of the Union of Post Office Workers from 1920 to 1928. He was also the first General Secretary of the National Union of Docks, Wharves and Shipping Staffs, and the Organising Secretary of the Civil Service Union.

== Local politics ==
Ammon was London County Councillor for Camberwell North from 1919 to 1925 and from 1934 to 1946, and Chairman of London County Council from 1941 to 1942. He was an Alderman on Camberwell Borough Council from 1934 to 1953 and Mayor of Camberwell from 1950 to 1951. He received the Freedom of Borough of Camberwell in 1951.

== Parliament ==
Ammon was Member of Parliament (MP) for Camberwell North 1922–1931 and 1935–1944, unsuccessfully contesting the seat in 1918 and 1931. He was Labour Party whip in 1923 and a member of the National Executive Committee of the Labour Party, 1921–1926. He served as Parliamentary Secretary to the Admiralty in 1924 and again in 1929-1931 and was a member of the West African Mission of 1938-1939 and of the Select Committee on National Expenditure, 1939–1944. He was temporary Chairman of Committees in 1943 and the same year served as Chairman of a Parliamentary Commission to investigate the future of the dominion of Newfoundland; the other members were A. P. Herbert and Derrick Gunston.

He was raised to the peerage as Baron Ammon, of Camberwell in the County of Surrey, in 1944 and appointed a Privy Counsellor in 1945. In the House of Lords he was Captain of the Gentlemen-at-Arms (Chief Whip) 1945–1949, and a Deputy Speaker of the House 1945–1958. In 1947 he was Chairman of a Parliamentary Mission to China. He was first Chairman of the National Dock Labour Board 1944–1950. His political career was effectively ended when he clashed with the government over the 1949 London dock strike.

== Other public appointments ==
Outside Parliament, he was president of the UK Band of Hope Union and a Methodist Local Preacher. He was president of the International Arbitration League, vice-president of the Royal National Lifeboat Institution, a governor of the London School of Economics and Dulwich College and chairman of the trustees of Crystal Palace. He was a member of the Channel Islands Commission in 1947.

== Personal life ==
Lord Ammon was predeceased by his only son Charles Kempley Ammon (1907–1909) and the peerage became extinct on his death in April 1960, aged 86.

Parliament of the United Kingdom
| Preceded by Henry Newton Knights | Member of Parliament for Camberwell North; February 1922 – 1931 | Succeeded by Arthur Bateman |
| Preceded by Arthur Bateman | Member of Parliament for Camberwell North; 1935 – 1944 | Succeeded by Cecil Manning |
Trade union offices
| Preceded by E. J. Nevill | Chair of the Fawcett Association; 1911–1919 | Position abolished |
| Preceded by Thomas Greenall; Ivor Gwynne | Trades Union Congress representative to the American Federation of Labour; 1914; With: Ernest Bevin | Succeeded by Harry Gosling; William Whitefield |
| New post | General Secretary of the National Union of Docks, Wharves and Shipping Staffs; 1918 – 1919 | Succeeded by Alfred Short |
Political offices
| Preceded by Albert Emil Davies | Chairman of the London County Council; 1941 – 1942 | Succeeded by J P Blake |
| Preceded by The Lord Templemore | Government Chief Whip in the House of Lords; 1945 – 1949 | Succeeded by The Lord Shepherd |
| Preceded by The Earl Fortescue | Captain of the Gentlemen-at-Arms; 1945 – 1949 | Succeeded by The Lord Shepherd |
Civic offices
| Preceded by Albert Crossman | Mayor of Camberwell; 1950–1951 | Succeeded by Cecil Manning |
Peerage of the United Kingdom
| New creation | Baron Ammon; 1944 – 1960 | Extinct |
