= Minet Library =

Library in Lambeth, London, England

Coordinates: 51.4714°N 0.1052°W

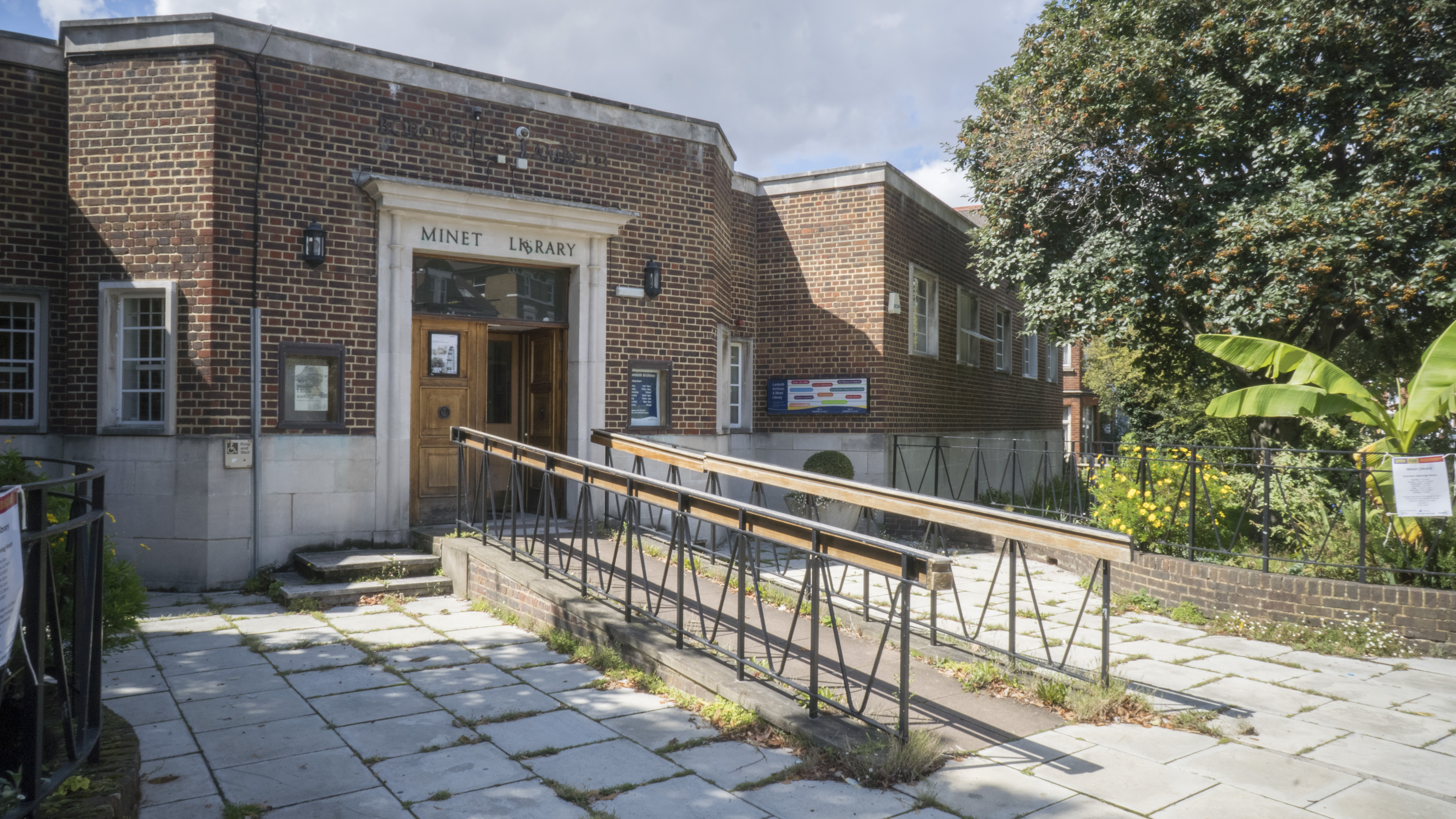
- Minet Library
- Location: Knatchbull Road; London, SE5, United Kingdom
- Type: Public library
- Established: 1890 (136 years ago)
- Branches: 1

Collection
- Items collected: Books, public records, photographs Lambeth Archives

Access and use
- Access requirements: Open - Lambeth Archives; Closed - public library

Other information
- Website: www.lambeth.gov.uk/places/minet-library

The Minet Library is a public library in the London Borough of Lambeth in South London. The library opened in 1890.

The building was home to Lambeth Archives for 133 years, however this facility moved to Brixton Hill in 2024.

== History ==
The Minet Library was built by William Minet and opened in 1890. Minet was a descendant of French Huguenots who immigrated to London in the 1700s, and in 1889 he also gave 14½ acres of land to the London County Council to create Myatt's Fields Park.

The library was designed to be a church hall for St. James The Apostle on Knatchbull Road and to be used by the tenants of the local estate. When Minet's first wife, Alice Evans, died in 1887 before the building was completed, he decided to turn it into a public library in her memory.

The library might have been completed before the nearby Durning Library and South Lambeth Tate Library, but was interrupted when the contractor went bankrupt, Minet was interested in the co-operative movement and decided to form a private company on co-operative lines. The experiment was successful and the library, which was designed by George Hubbard who also designed nearby Longfield Hall, was finished and opened in 1890.

Hubbard's octagonal library building, in the Gothic Revival style, was partially destroyed by an incendiary bomb on 8 December 1940 during The Blitz. The fire destroyed 18,585 books. Around 6,700 books were salvaged, and half of those were moved to Longfield Hall where a temporary library was established. The Surrey Collection, a collection of archive records established by William Minet, survived the fire because they were housed in a strong room.

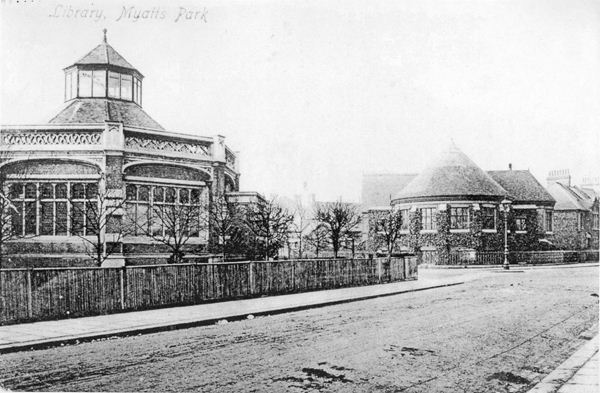
Minet Library around 1890

The library was rebuilt in 1956 and became part of the London Borough of Lambeth public library service and official home of the Lambeth Archives.

== The closure of Minet Library ==
In the late 1990s, the library began to suffer from cuts to local council funding, and Lambeth Council proposed closing the library on a number of occasions. This culminated in 2015 with Lambeth Council closing the library (but not the archive) and proposing to contract Greenwich Leisure Limited (GLL) to convert part of the building into a gym, with a limited library service continuing to operate.

The magazine Private Eye reported in May 2017 that Lambeth Council had begun talking to GLL about contracting them to turn Minet Library and others in the borough into gyms before a plan by library staff and local residents to save the libraries was rejected in 2015.

In May 2016, despite protests by local residents, the Minet Library was closed by the Lambeth Council. The library reopened in 2017, but with reduced services. It is currently operating as a self-service library.

Lambeth Archives and the local history reference collection re-located to a purpose-built archive building in Brixton in January 2024.
