= Hugh Chapman =

Liberal politician in London and Anglican clergyman

The Rev Hugh Boswell Chapman
- Born: 5 November 1853
- Died: 1 April 1933
- Education: Tonbridge School

The Rev Hugh Boswell Chapman (5 November 1853 – 1 April 1933) was a British Liberal politician and Anglican priest. He was a Progressive member of the London County Council from 1889 to 1892.

== Early life ==
Chapman was born in London in 1853, the son of Henry Chapman and his wife Priscilla (née Wakefield). Gen Sir Edward Chapman (1840-1926) and Sir Arthur Wakefield Chapman (1849-1926) were older brothers. He was the grandson of the philanthropist and statistician Edward Wakefield and great-grandson of the Quaker philanthropist Priscilla Wakefield.

He was educated at Tonbridge School and Keble College, Oxford (BA, 1875).

== Clerical career ==
He was ordained deacon in 1878 and priest in 1881. He served his title under the Rev the Hon Adelbert Anson (subsequently a bishop in Canada) at St Mary Magdalene, Woolwich (1878-1880) and then at St Paul's, Newington (also known as St Paul's, Lorrimore Square) (1881-1885), arriving at the latter shortly after the Bishop of Rochester, Dr Thorold, had imposed an Evangelical Vicar on the extreme Anglo-Catholic parish, prompting the mass exodus of the congregation to the nearby St Agnes, Kennington Park. During his time at Lorrimore Square he was Chaplain to the Forces in Egypt during the Anglo-Egyptian War of 1882. He was Vicar of St Luke's, Camberwell (1885-1909) and then Chaplain at the Savoy Chapel (1909-1933).

Chapman was a proponent of the Normyl treatment for alcoholism. He was an active supporter of Father Damien's leper hospital in Hawaii. He established a "Hugh Boswell" Lodge of the Independent Order of Odd Fellows at St Luke's; the Bishop of Rochester, the Rt Rev Edward Talbot was initiated as a member in 1901. St Luke's had a notable reputation under Chapman: Princess Mary, the Duchess of Teck (the mother of Queen Mary) was a regular visitor, and he was responsible for decorations being installed by John Ruskin's Century Guild of Artists, Herbert Horne, Frederic Shields, Selwyn Image, and Edward Burne-Jones. (The church was bombed in 1941, and rebuilt.)

The Savoy Chapel was widely known during Chapman's incumbency as a location where divorced persons were permitted to marry or to have their civil marriages blessed. Notable weddings included that of Consuelo, Duchess of Marlborough and Lt Col Jacques Balsan in 1921 and Edith Stuyvesant Vanderbilt and Senator Peter Goelet Gerry in 1925. A condition of such 'benedictory' services was that there be no publicity. Nevertheless, in 1926 Chapman refused to marry Lord Sholto Douglas and Mrs Mendelssohn Pickles, on the basis they were the guilty parties in their respective divorces. Chapman's successor as Chaplain, the Rev Cyril Cresswell, immediately brought an end to the marriage of divorced persons in the Chapel.

== London County Council ==
Chapman was elected to the newly-formed London County Council for Camberwell North (in which St Luke's was situated) in 1889 as a Progressive. He did not seek re-election in 1892. His brother, Cecil Maurice Chapman, was a Moderate Party member for Chelsea from 1895 to 1898.

== Works ==
Chapman was the author of a number of books.

- The Seven Last Words of Love (1885: Griffith Farran & Co)
- Sermons in Symbols (1888: Swan Sonnenschein, Lowrey & Co)
- Where is Christ? (1890: Swan Sonnenschein & Co)
- Steps to the Higher Life (1897: Swan Sonnenschein & Co)
- Proverbs in Practice (1909: F. H. Morland)
- At the Back of Things (1911: Duckworth & Co)
- The soul of women’s suffrage (1912: Corrigan & Wilson)
- Home Truths about the War (1917: G. Allen & Unwin)

== Personal life ==
Chapman was unmarried. During his incumbency at the Savoy Chapel, he lived at the National Club, at 12 Queen Anne’s Gate. He died in a nursing home in 1933, aged 79.
