= 1944 Camberwell North by-election =

UK parliamentary by-election

← 1935	31 March 1944	1945 →

Constituency of Camberwell North
- Turnout: 11.2% (▼44.4%)
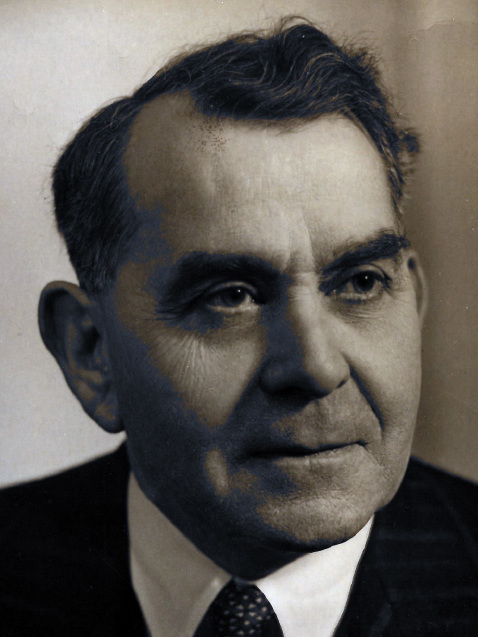
	First party	Second party
		Ind.
Candidate	Cecil Manning	T.F.R. Disher
Party	Labour	Independent
Popular vote	2,655	674
Percentage	79.8%	20.2%
Swing	▲15.1%	N/A
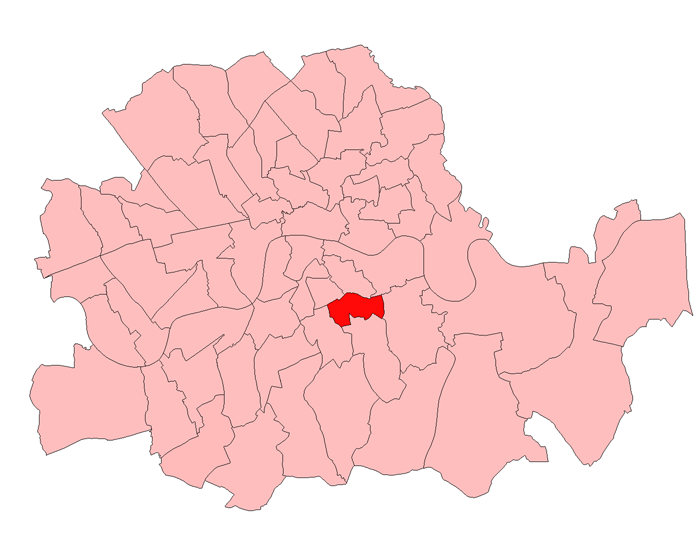
- A map of parliamentary constituencies within the County of London at the time of the by-election, with Camberwell North highlighted in red.
MP before election
Charles Ammon
Labour
Subsequent MP
Cecil Manning
Labour

The 1944 Camberwell North by-election was a by-election held on 31 March 1944 for the British House of Commons constituency of Camberwell North.

The by-election was triggered by the elevation to the peerage of the town's Labour Member of Parliament (MP) Charles Ammon, who was ennobled as Baron Ammon.

The Labour candidate was Cecil Manning, who was unopposed by the other parties in the wartime coalition. The only other candidate was an independent, T. F. Disher, who had also contested the previous general election in 1935. The result was one of the lowest turnouts in a by-election on record: the number of available electors was estimated at around 8,000, and Manning was elected with just 2,655 votes against Disher's 674, a majority of just 1,981.

== Result ==
Camberwell North by-election, 30 March 1944
Party	Candidate	Votes	%	±%
Labour	Cecil Manning	2,655	79.8	+15.1
Independent	T.F.R. Disher	674	20.2	New
Majority		1,981	59.6	+27.7
Turnout		29,661	11.2	−44.4
Labour hold		Swing		

== See also ==
- List of United Kingdom by-elections
- Camberwell North constituency
