= Myatt's Fields Park =

Park in Camberwell, London Borough of Lambeth, England

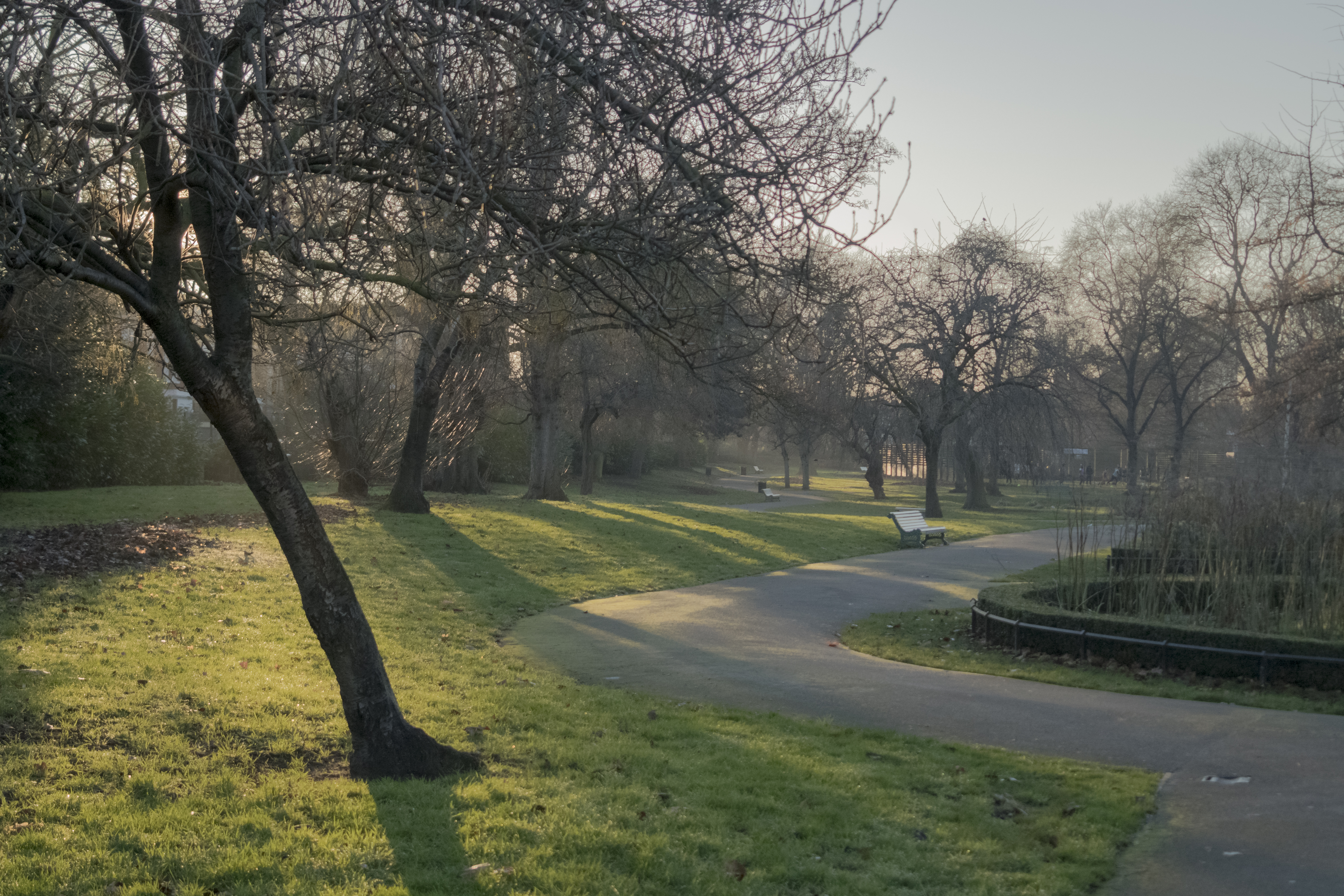
- Myatt's Fields Park in winter

- Location within Greater London
- Type: Public park
- Location: London, England
- Coordinates: 51°28′24″N 0°06′12″W
- Status: Open year round
- Website: www.myattsfieldspark.info

Myatt's Fields Park is a 14-acre Victorian park in Camberwell in the London Borough of Lambeth in South London, England, 2.9 miles south-east of Charing Cross.

== History ==
The majority of the area of Myatt's Fields belonged to the estate of Sir Hughes Minet, who in 1770 bought 118 acres of land from Sir Edward Knatchbull on the border of Camberwell and Lambeth. Minet was a third-generation descendant of Isaac Minet, a French Huguenot refugee who had fled France following the 1685 Revocation of the Edict of Nantes. The names of some of the streets around the park, such as Calais Street and Cormont Road, refer to Minet's French connection.

In 1889, Hughes Minet's descendant William Minet gave 14½ acres of land then in the parish of Camberwell to the London County Council to be used for a public park. Initially to be called Camberwell Park, the name Myatt’s Fields was settled on in 1889. In 1900 the irregular Lambeth/Camberwell boundary was tidied up, transferring the park from Camberwell to Lambeth. The Metropolitan Public Gardens Association then spent some £10,000 on the layout of the park, and it was opened on 13 April 1889. In 1935, William Minet's daughter, Susan Minet, gave a further quarter of an acre of land near the junction of Knatchbull Road and Calais Street to the park. Minet family philanthropy also resulted in the construction on the adjacent Knatchbull Road of the neighbouring St James the Apostle church (now converted to flats), the Minet Library, and Longfield Hall, a community hall.

The park was designed by Fanny Wilkinson, Britain's first professional woman landscape gardener. Wilkinson was assisted by Emmeline Sieveking, the daughter of Queen Victoria's physician, Sir Edward Sieveking. It is named after Joseph Myatt, a tenant market gardener, who grew strawberries and rhubarb (for which he was famed) on the land in the 19th century. The park's mulberry tree may date from the land's previous use as a market garden.

Hyperlapse video around the inside and outside of the park

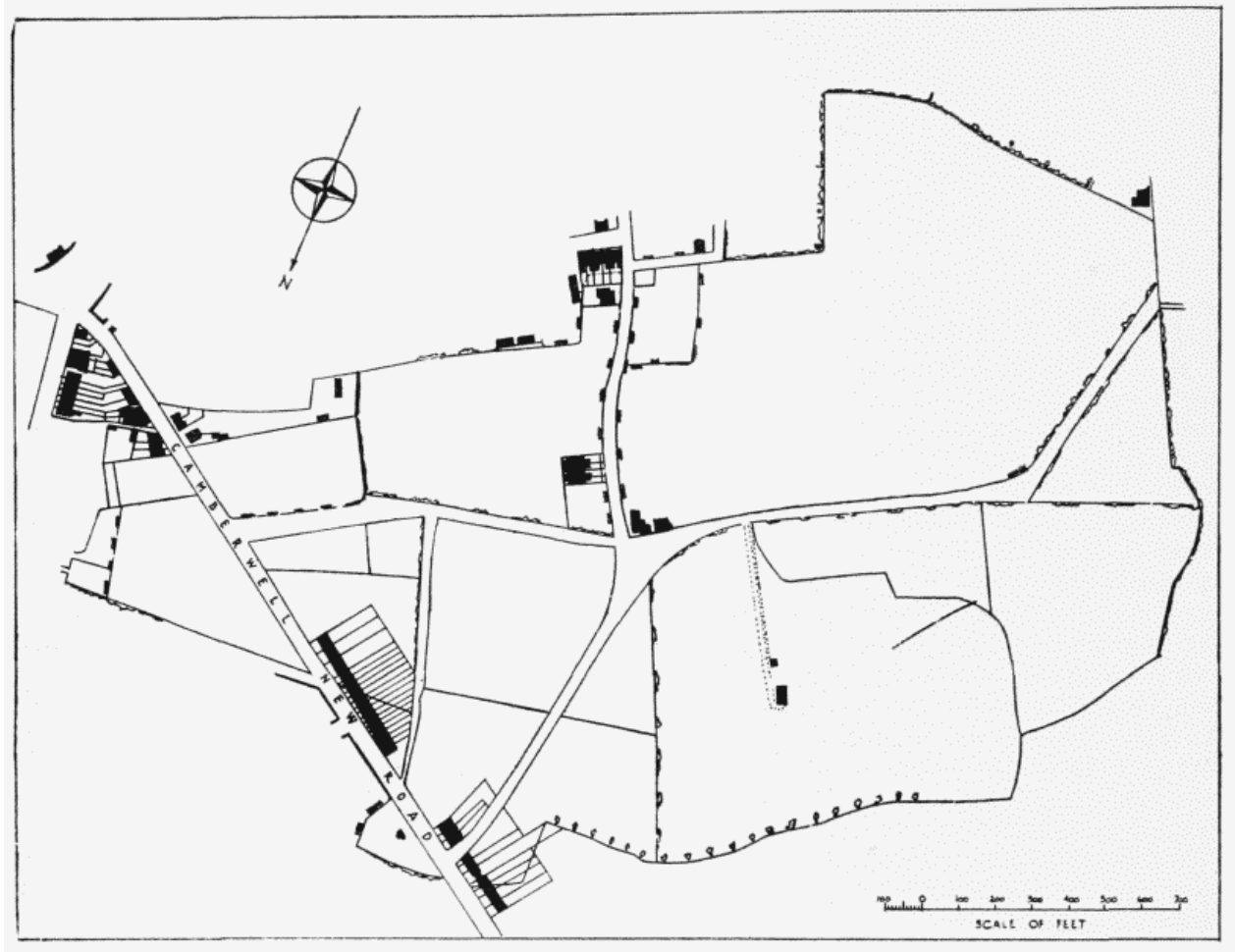
Minet estate in 1841

In 2009, a £2.6m renovation of the park was completed with funding from the Heritage Lottery Fund and Lambeth Council, as well as £300,000 raised by the Myatt's Fields Park Project Group. The MFPPG is run by local volunteers and was chaired from 2000 until 2011 by Lindsay Avebury (the daughter of Pamela Hansford Johnson and the wife of Eric Lubbock). The current chair is Marjorie Landels.

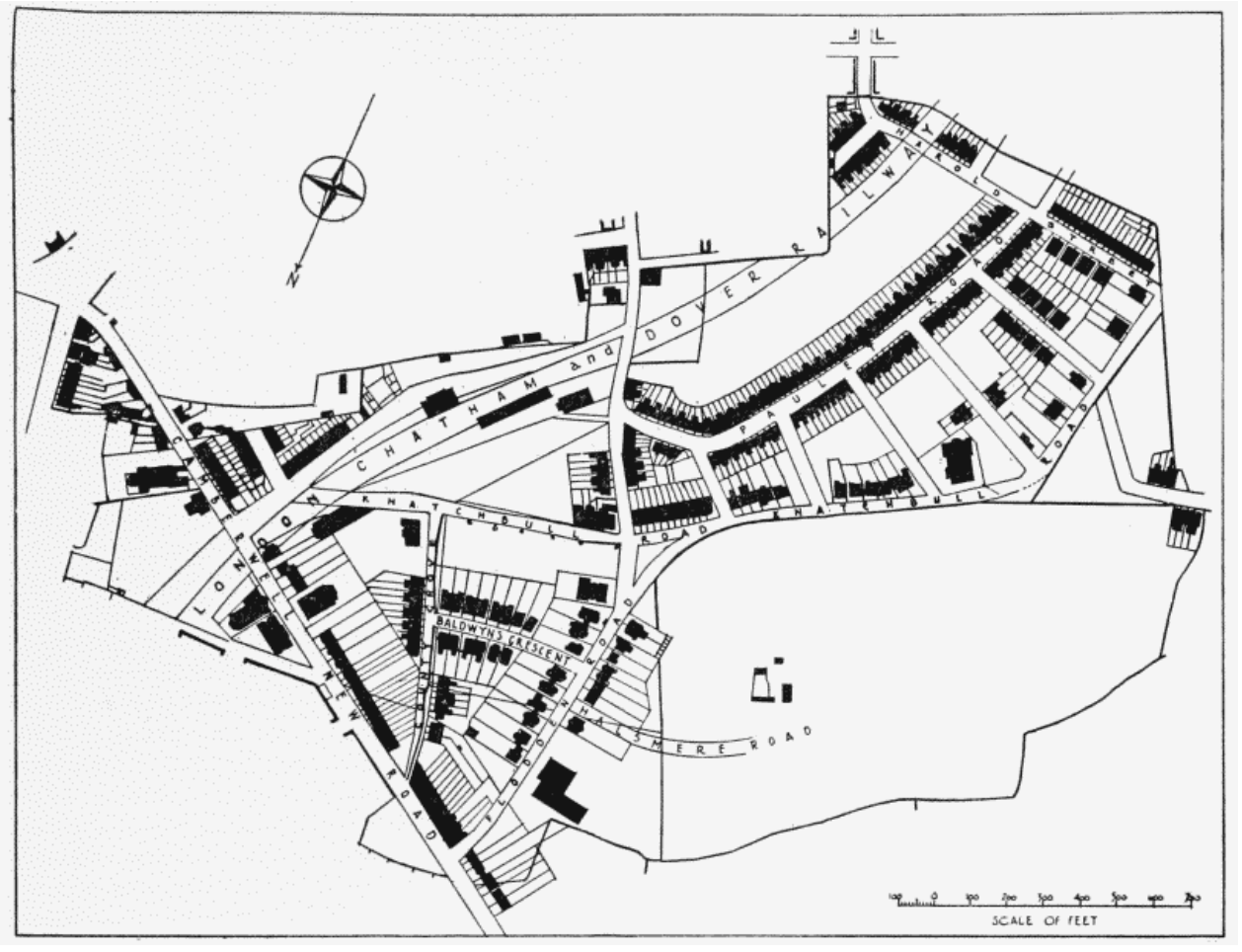
Minet estate in 1885

Both the park itself and the bandstand in it are Grade II listed.

Since 2015, the park has been managed by MFPPG in collaboration with Lambeth Council under the 'Pioneer Park' model, with a lease that runs until 2030. Lambeth Council is funding the renovation of the park depot into a multipurpose community centre, with works due to begin in 2026.

The singer Florence Welch of Florence and the Machine grew up near the park and has said that her earliest memory was of climbing trees in the park.

The park was once described by former Poet Laureate John Betjeman as a "strangely beautiful place."

== Features ==
The park includes a bandstand, summerhouse, and café. It is also home to tennis courts, a football pitch, basketball court, picnic area, a children's playground and a community greenhouse.

In 2015, Myatt's Fields was voted the 9th best park in the UK in a public vote organised by the Green Flag Award.
