= Thomas Williams, 1st Baron Williams =

Thomas Edward Williams, 1st Baron Williams (26 July 1892 – 18 February 1966), was a peer of the United Kingdom.

Williams attended Porth County School, and later Ruskin College. He moved to London and joined the Labour Party, and in 1919 was elected to Woolwich Metropolitan Borough Council. He stood unsuccessfully for the party in Finsbury at the 1931 UK general election, and that year was elected to the party's National Executive Committee (NEC).

In 1932, Williams was elected to London County Council, representing Camberwell North; on this council, he chaired the Parliamentary Committee. He left the council and the NEC in 1935, and focused on the co-operative movement, serving as president of the Co-operative Wholesale Society, the central executive of the Co-operative Union, as chair of the English and Scottish Joint Co-operative Wholesale Society, and as president of the Co-operative Congress in 1952–53.

He was ennobled on 24 June 1948 as Baron Williams, of Ynyshir in the County of Glamorgan. The peerage became extinct on his death in 1966. He was also made a Commander of the Order of Dannebrog.

In 1947 Williams was appointed a member of the London Transport Executive.

Peerage of the United Kingdom
New creation	Baron Williams; 1948–1966	Extinct
Party political offices
Preceded by F. W. Jowett	Socialist societies representative of the Labour Party National Executive Committee; 1931–1935	Succeeded by Walter Green
