= 1922 Camberwell North by-election =

UK Parliamentary by-election

← 1918	20 February 1922	1922 →
Candidate	Ammon	Meller
Party	Labour	Unionist
Popular vote	7,854	6,719
Percentage	53.9%	46.1%
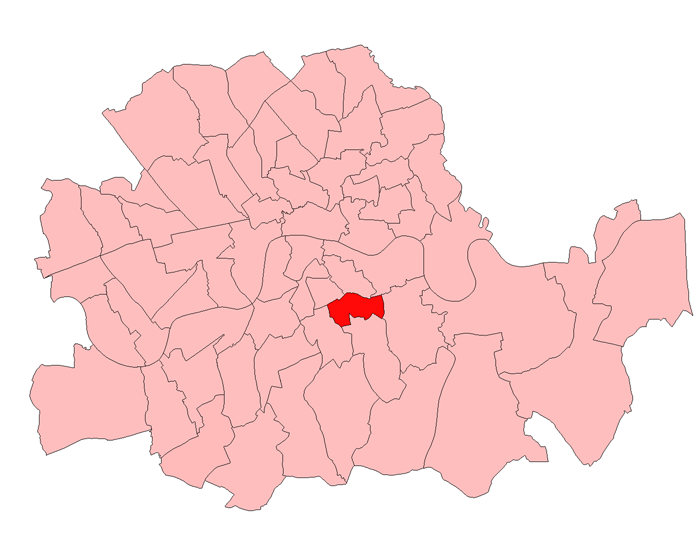
MP before election
Knights
Unionist
Subsequent MP
Ammon
Labour

The 1922 Camberwell North by-election was held on 20 February 1922. The by-election was held due to the resignation of the incumbent Coalition Conservative MP, Henry Newton Knights. It was won by the Labour candidate Charles Ammon.

== Previous election ==
General election 14 December 1918: Camberwell, North Electorate
Party	Candidate	Votes	%	±%
Unionist	Henry Newton Knights	6,010	58.0	
Liberal	George Hearn	2,177	21.0	
Labour	Charles Ammon	2,175	21.0	
Majority		3,833	37.0	N/A
Turnout		26,416	39.2	
Unionist gain from Liberal		Swing		

== Result ==
1922 Camberwell North by-election Electorate
Party	Candidate	Votes	%	±%
Labour	Charles Ammon	7,854	53.9	+32.9
Unionist	Richard Meller	6,719	46.1	−11.9
Majority		1,135	7.8	N/A
Turnout		28,709	50.8	+11.6
Labour gain from Unionist		Swing		

== Following election ==
General election 15 November 1922: Camberwell North Electorate
Party	Candidate	Votes	%	±%
Labour	Charles Ammon	8,320	50.8	−13.4
Unionist	Helen Gwynne-Vaughan	8,066	49.2	+13.4
Majority		254	1.6	−6.2
Turnout		16,386	56.7	+5.9
Labour hold		Swing	-13.4	
