= Thomas Macnamara =

British politician

The Right Honourable Thomas Macnamara
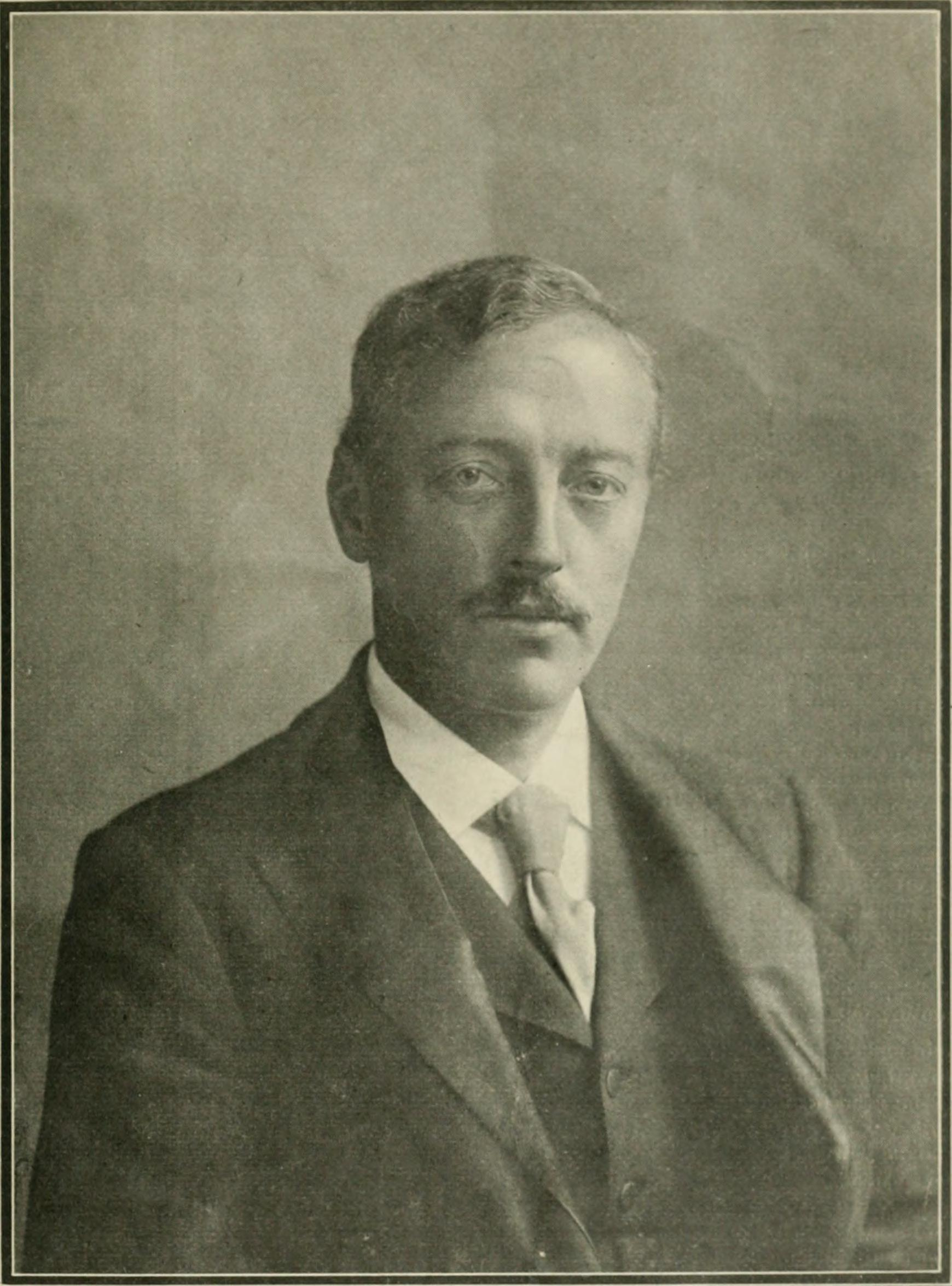

Minister of Labour
- In office 19 March 1920 – 19 October 1922
- Monarch: George V
- Prime Minister: David Lloyd George
- Preceded by: Sir Robert Horne
- Succeeded by: Anderson Montague-Barlow

Personal details
- Born: 23 August 1861 Montreal, Quebec, Canada
- Died: 3 December 1931 (aged 70)

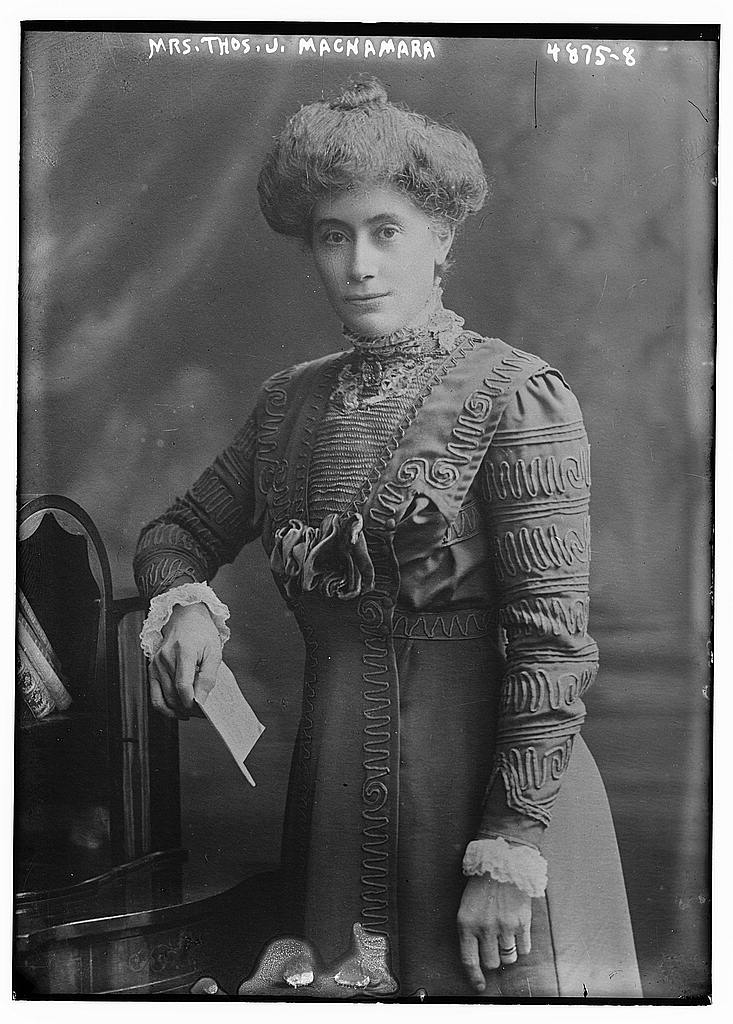
Mrs. Rachel Macnamara

Thomas James Macnamara PC (23 August 1861 – 3 December 1931) was a British teacher, educationalist and radical Liberal politician.

== Biography ==
Macnamara was born in Montreal, Quebec, Canada, the son of a soldier originally from County Clare in Ireland. His family returned to Britain in 1869.

He was educated first at the Depot School in Pembroke Dock and then in Exeter. He qualified as a teacher in 1876 at the Borough Road Training College for Teachers.

In 1886, he married Rachel Cameron. They had three sons and one daughter.

== Teaching ==
He was active as a teacher until 1892 in Exeter, Huddersfield and Bristol, when he became editor of The Schoolmaster. He was sometime chairman of the London School Board and in 1896 he was appointed president of the National Union of Teachers.

== Politics ==
In 1900 he was elected to the House of Commons for Camberwell North, a seat he held until 1918, and then represented Camberwell North West until 1924. He served under Sir Henry Campbell-Bannerman as Parliamentary Secretary to the Local Government Board from 1907 to 1908 and under H. H. Asquith and later David Lloyd George as Parliamentary and Financial Secretary to the Admiralty from 1908 to 1920 and was sworn of the Privy Council in 1911. In 1920 Lloyd George appointed him Minister of Labour, with a seat in the cabinet, a position he retained until the government fell in October 1922.

== Death ==
Macnamara died on 3 December 1931, aged 70, of prostate cancer.

== Elsie Cameron Elias ==
Elsie Elias in 1924

His daughter, Elsie Cameron Macnamara was born in 1889. In April 1913 she married Thomas Elias and became known as Elsie Cameron Elias. Her husband was Liberal candidate for Neath in 1923. At the 1924 General Election she stood as Liberal candidate for Southwark South East, finishing third.

== Publications ==
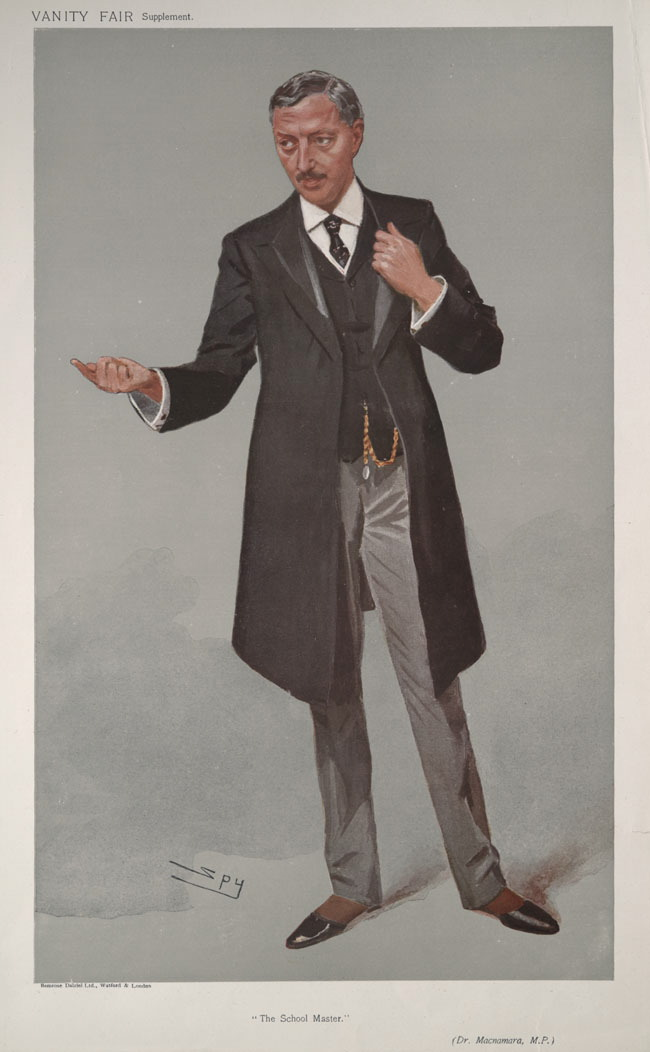
Caricature of Macnamara by "Spy" (Leslie Ward) in Vanity Fair magazine, 1907

- Schoolmaster sketches – Cassell, 1896
- The Education Bill and its Probable Effects on the Schools, the Scholars and School Teachers – Swan Sonnesschein, 1902
- The Gentle Golfer – Arrowsmith, 1905
- School-Room Humour - Arrowsmith, 1905
- The Education Bill of 1906 Explained and Defended – Liberal Publication Dept. 1906
- School Room Humour – Simpkin, Marshall, Hamilton, 1907
- What Not To Do in H Seton-Karr, Golf – Greening, 1907
- The Political Situation: Letters to Working Men – Hodder and Stoughton, 1909
- Concerning the Navy – Liberal Publication Dept. 1910
- Dr Macnamara's Messages to Working Men – Hodder and Stoughton, 1910
- Let London Lead: The Mother City's Duty to the Empire and Herself – reprinted with additions from the Daily Chronicle, 1910
- The Great Insurance Act: Addresses to Working Men – Hodder and Stoughton, 1912
- The Great Insurance Act: A Year's Experience – Liberal Publication Dept 1913
- Success in Industry – Harrison, 1920
- The Work of the Ministry of Labour – National Liberal Council, 1922
- Labour at the Crossroads: Two Camberwell Addresses – Hodder and Stoughton, 1923
- If Only We Would: Some Reflections on our Social Shortcomings and Some Suggestions for their Removal – P S King, 1926

Parliament of the United Kingdom
| Preceded by Philip Dalbiac | Member of Parliament for Camberwell North; 1900 – 1918 | Succeeded by Henry Newton Knights |
| New constituency | Member of Parliament for Camberwell North West; 1918 – 1924 | Succeeded by Edward Campbell |
Political offices
| Preceded by Walter Runciman | Parliamentary Secretary to the Local Government Board; 1907 – 1908 | Succeeded by Charles Masterman |
| Preceded by Edmund Robertson | Parliamentary and Financial Secretary to the Admiralty; 1908 – 1920 | Succeeded by Sir James Craig |
| Preceded by Robert Horne | Minister of Labour; 1920 – 1922 | Succeeded by Anderson Montague-Barlow |
Trade union offices
| Preceded by T. B. Ellery | President of the National Union of Teachers; 1896 | Succeeded by C. J. Addiscott |
