= Reginald Bray (politician) =

British local politician (1869–1950)

Reginald Arthur Bray (20 May 1869 – 31 July 1950) was a British politician who served on London County Council.

In 1903, he was co-opted to the London School Board, but served only until the following year, when it was abolished. He then stood in the 1904 London County Council election in Camberwell North, for the Progressive Party. He won election, and served until 1919.

Bray joined the Fabian Society in 1903, and served on its executive committee for a couple of years in the 1910s.
