= Lambeth Archives =

Archive in Lambeth, London

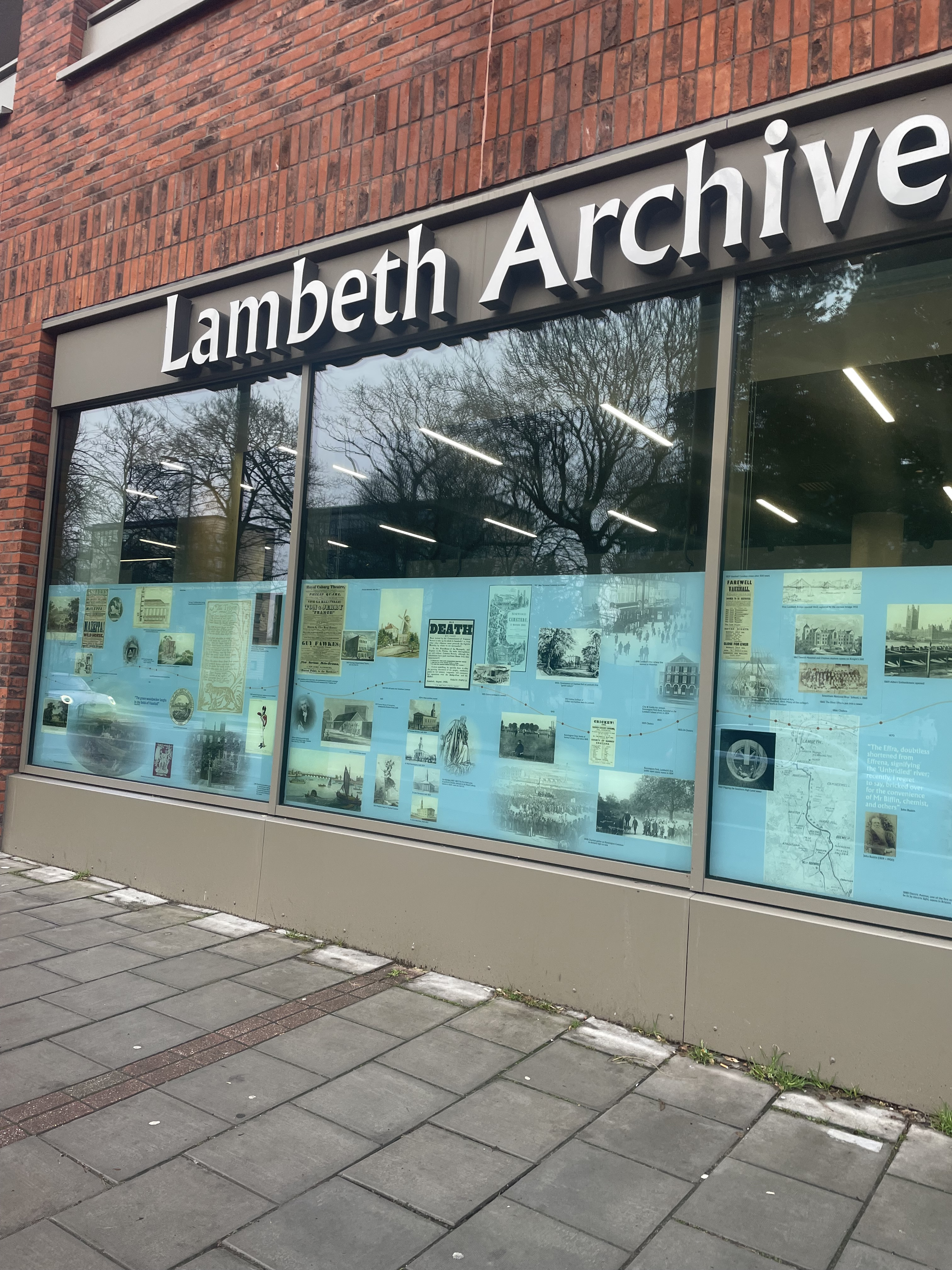
- Interactive map of Lambeth Archives
- 51.4581°N 0.1179°W
- Location: 16 Brixton Hill, London, United Kingdom
- Established: 1890
- Website: Official website

Lambeth Archives is an archive in South London, managed by the London Borough of Lambeth. Containing records of Lambeth businesses, organisations and individuals. Until 2023, for 133 years the Lambeth Archives collections were housed at Minet Library, 52 Knatchbull Road. In February 2024, Lambeth Archives reopened at its new purpose built facility, 16 Brixton Hill.

The archive holds various documents for tracing family history, including parish records, electoral registers, civil registers, census returns, poll books, cemetery records, trade and commercial directories, and historic newspapers. The archive is open to the public free of charge. The Archives has an exhibition space which is used to showcase the work of local creatives and occasionally as a meeting area.
