= Richard Strong =

English Liberal politician

Richard Strong

Richard Strong (1833 – 30 January 1915) was an English Liberal politician.

Strong was born at St George's-in-the-East, London, the son of a flour factor of Mark Lane, London. He became a J.P. for Surrey, and a governor of Dulwich College.

In the 1885 general election, Strong was elected Member of Parliament for Camberwell North. He retired at the 1886 general election. He made no contributions in parliament during his time as an MP.

Strong was a member of the Metropolitan Asylums Board and chairman of the Exmouth Training Ship Committee, an institution that trained workhouse boys to be sailors. In 1892 he was appointed a member of the board of governors of the newly formed Borough Road Polytechnic.

The Local Government Act 1888 created an elected London County Council, and Strong was chosen by the North Camberwell Liberal and Radical Association as a candidate for the first election. He was elected to the council, forming part of the majority Progressive Party group, which was backed by the parliamentary Liberal Party. He continued to represent North Camberwell on the council until 1904, being re-elected on four occasions, and was a county alderman from 1904 until 1907.

Strong died at the age of 81.

Strong married Sarah from Worplesdon.

Parliament of the United Kingdom
| New constituency | Member of Parliament for Camberwell North; 1885 – 1886 | Succeeded by John Richards Kelly |
