= Camberwell North =

Parliamentary constituency in the United Kingdom, 1885–1950

- Former borough constituency for the House of Commons
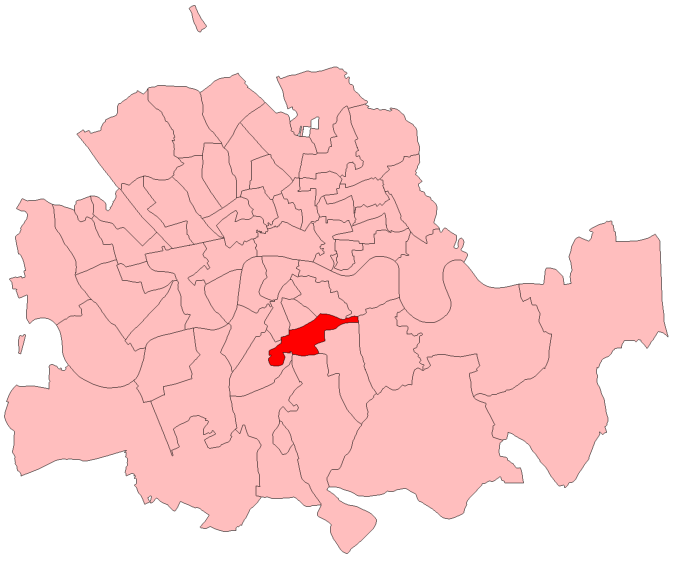
- Camberwell North in London 1885–1918

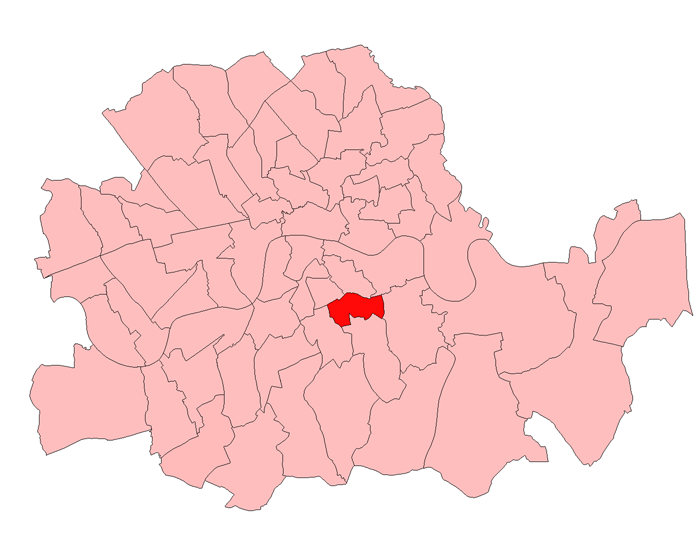
- Camberwell North in London 1918–50
- County: County of London

1885–1950
- Seats: One
- Created from: Lambeth
- Replaced by: Peckham

Camberwell North was a borough constituency located in the Metropolitan Borough of Camberwell, in South London. It returned one Member of Parliament (MP) to the House of Commons of the Parliament of the United Kingdom. The constituency was created for the 1885 general election, and abolished for the 1950 general election.

== Boundaries ==

1918–1950: The Metropolitan Borough of Camberwell wards of Coburg, Marlborough, North Peckham and St George's.

== Members of Parliament ==
Year	Member	Party
1885	Richard Strong	Liberal
1886	John Richards Kelly	Conservative
1892	Edward Hodson Bayley	Liberal
1895	Philip Dalbiac	Conservative
1900	Thomas Macnamara	Liberal
1916	Thomas Macnamara	Coalition Liberal
1918	Henry Newton Knights	Unionist
1922	Charles Ammon	Labour
1931	Arthur Bateman	Conservative
1935	Charles Ammon	Labour
1944	Cecil Manning	Labour
1950	constituency abolished	

== Election results ==
=== Elections in the 1880s ===
Strong

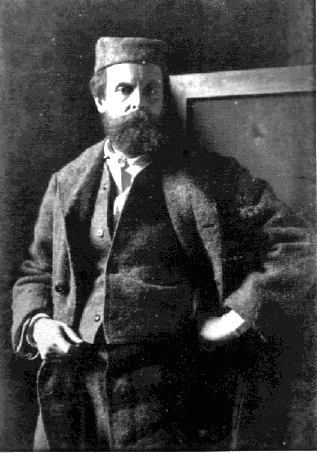
Blunt

General election 1885: Camberwell North
Party	Candidate	Votes	%
Liberal	Richard Strong	3,137	51.3
Conservative	Wilfrid Blunt	2,975	48.7
Majority		162	2.6
Turnout		6,112	71.0
Registered electors		8,603	
Liberal win (new seat)			

General election 1886: Camberwell North
Party	Candidate	Votes	%	±%
Conservative	John Richards Kelly	2,717	51.1	+2.4
Liberal	Edward Hodson Bayley	2,352	44.3	−7.0
Independent Liberal Unionist	William Pirie Duff	246	4.6	New
Majority		365	6.8	N/A
Turnout		5,315	61.8	−9.2
Registered electors		8,603		
Conservative gain from Liberal		Swing	+4.7	

=== Election in the 1890s ===
General election 1892: Camberwell North
Party	Candidate	Votes	%	±%
Liberal	Edward Hodson Bayley	4,295	55.5	+11.2
Conservative	John Richards Kelly	3,450	44.5	−6.6
Majority		845	11.0	N/A
Turnout		7,745	69.6	+7.8
Registered electors		11,133		
Liberal gain from Conservative		Swing	+8.9	

Dalbiac

General election 1895: Camberwell North
Party	Candidate	Votes	%	±%
Conservative	Philip Dalbiac	4,009	54.5	+10.0
Liberal	Edward Hodson Bayley	3,316	45.1	−10.4
Independent Liberal	Nelson P. Palmer	32	0.4	New
Majority		693	9.4	N/A
Turnout		7,357	66.5	−3.1
Registered electors		11,064		
Conservative gain from Liberal		Swing	+10.2	

=== Elections in the 1900s ===
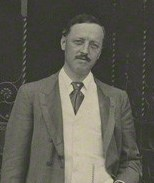
Macnamara

General election 1900: Camberwell North
Party	Candidate	Votes	%	±%
Liberal	Thomas Macnamara	4,820	58.0	+12.9
Conservative	Joseph Diggle	3,485	42.0	−12.5
Majority		1,335	16.0	N/A
Turnout		8,305	67.0	+0.5
Registered electors		12,397		
Liberal gain from Conservative		Swing	+12.7	

General election 1906: Camberwell North
Party	Candidate	Votes	%	±%
Liberal	Thomas Macnamara	6,314	64.4	+6.4
Conservative	Charles H Hoare	3,497	35.6	−6.4
Majority		2,817	28.8	+12.8
Turnout		9,811	78.4	+11.4
Registered electors		12,519		
Liberal hold		Swing	+6.4	

=== Elections in the 1910s ===
General election January 1910: Camberwell North
Party	Candidate	Votes	%	±%
Liberal	Thomas Macnamara	5,593	55.4	−9.0
Conservative	Sydney Hoffnung Goldsmid	4,511	44.6	+9.0
Majority		1,082	10.8	−18.0
Turnout		10,104	84.8	+6.4
Registered electors		11,918		
Liberal hold		Swing	-9.0	

Macnamara

General election December 1910: Camberwell North
Party	Candidate	Votes	%	±%
Liberal	Thomas Macnamara	5,038	55.4	0.0
Conservative	Sydney Hoffnung Goldsmid	4,056	44.6	0.0
Majority		982	10.8	0.0
Turnout		9,094	76.3	−8.5
Registered electors		11,918		
Liberal hold		Swing	0.0	

General Election 1914–15:

Another General Election was required to take place before the end of 1915. The political parties had been making preparations for an election to take place and by July 1914, the following candidates had been selected;

- Liberal: Thomas Macnamara
- Unionist: Walter Radford

In 1918 constituency boundaries were changed and a new seat of Camberwell North West was created. Macnamara chose to contest the new seat.

General election 1918: Camberwell North
Party		Candidate	Votes	%
C	Unionist Party (UK)	Henry Newton Knights	6,010	58.0
	Liberal	George Hearn	2,177	21.0
	Labour	Charles Ammon	2,175	21.0
Majority			3,833	37.0
Turnout			26,416	39.2
	Unionist win (new boundaries)			
C indicates candidate endorsed by the coalition government.

=== Elections in the 1920s ===
1922 Camberwell North by-election
Party	Candidate	Votes	%	±%
Labour	Charles Ammon	7,854	53.9	+32.9
Unionist	Richard Meller	6,719	46.1	−11.9
Majority		1,135	7.8	N/A
Turnout		28,709	50.8	+11.6
Labour gain from Unionist		Swing		

General election 1922: Camberwell North
Party	Candidate	Votes	%	±%
Labour	Charles Ammon	8,320	50.8	+29.8
Unionist	Helen Gwynne-Vaughan	8,066	49.2	−9.2
Majority		254	1.6	N/A
Turnout		16,386	56.7	+5.9
Labour gain from Conservative		Swing	-13.4	

General election 1923: Camberwell North
Party	Candidate	Votes	%	±%
Labour	Charles Ammon	10,620	64.2	+13.4
Unionist	Helen Gwynne-Vaughan	5,934	35.8	−13.4
Majority		4,686	28.4	+26.8
Turnout		16,554	56.9	+0.2
Labour hold		Swing	+13.4	

General election 1924: Camberwell North
Party	Candidate	Votes	%	±%
Labour	Charles Ammon	11,300	54.9	−9.3
Unionist	Helen Gwynne-Vaughan	7,564	36.7	+0.9
Liberal	Victor Diederichs Duval	1,729	8.4	New
Majority		3,736	18.2	−10.2
Turnout		20,593	69.7	+12.8
Labour hold		Swing	-5.4	

General election 1929: Camberwell North
Party	Candidate	Votes	%	±%
Labour	Charles Ammon	13,051	57.9	+3.0
Unionist	Leo St. Clare Grondona	5,228	23.2	−13.5
Liberal	Henry James Edwards	4,244	18.8	+10.4
Majority		7,823	34.7	+16.6
Turnout		225,23	63.0	−6.7
Labour hold		Swing	+8.3	

=== Election in the 1930s ===
General election 1931: Camberwell North
Party	Candidate	Votes	%	±%
Conservative	Arthur Bateman	10,634	51.9	+28.7
Labour	Charles Ammon	9,869	48.1	−9.8
Majority		765	3.8	N/A
Turnout		20,503	58.3	−4.7
Conservative gain from Labour		Swing		

General election 1935: Camberwell North
Party	Candidate	Votes	%	±%
Labour	Charles Ammon	11,701	64.7	+16.6
Conservative	Thomas Martin	5,924	32.8	−9.1
Independent Radical Reform	Thomas Frederick Rhodes Disher	451	2.5	New
Majority		5,777	31.9	N/A
Turnout		18,076	55.6	−2.7
Labour gain from Conservative		Swing		

General Election 1939–40

Another General Election was required to take place before the end of 1940. The political parties had been making preparations for an election to take place and by the Autumn of 1939, the following candidates had been selected;

- Labour: Charles Ammon
- Conservative: Edward Rudolph Mayer

=== Election in the 1940s ===
1944 Camberwell North by-election
Party	Candidate	Votes	%	±%
Labour	Cecil Manning	2,655	79.8	+15.1
Independent	Thomas Frederick Rhodes Disher	674	20.2	New
Majority		1,981	59.6	+27.7
Turnout		29,661	11.2	−44.4
Labour hold		Swing		

General election 1945: Camberwell North
Party	Candidate	Votes	%	±%
Labour	Cecil Manning	7,186	76.6	+11.9
Conservative	Edward Rudolph Mayer	1,394	14.9	−17.9
Independent National	Thomas Frederick Rhodes Disher	794	8.5	New
Majority		5,792	61.7	+29.8
Turnout		15,506	60.5	+4.9
Labour hold		Swing		
