= Metropolitan Borough of Camberwell =

Former Metropolitan Borough in England

Coordinates: 51.4741°N 0.0828°W

Camberwell
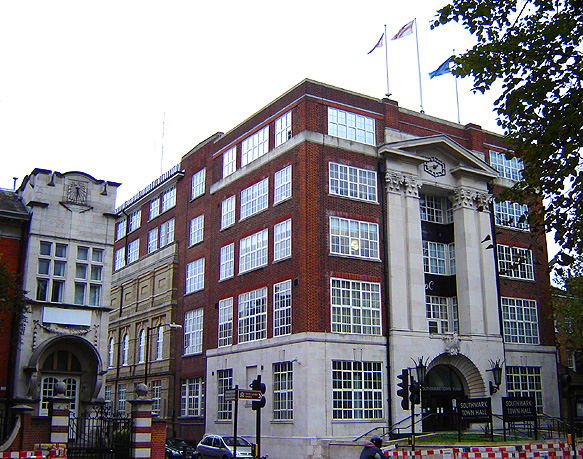
- The former Camberwell Town Hall

- The Borough of Camberwell within the County of London
- Area
  - 1911/1931: 4,480 acres (18.1 km^{2})
  - 1961: 4,482 acres (18.14 km^{2})
- Population
  - 1911: 261,328
  - 1931: 251,294
  - 1961: 175,304
- Density
  - 1911: 58/acre
  - 1931: 56/acre
  - 1961: 39/acre
- History
  - Origin: Ancient parish
  - Abolished: 1965
  - Succeeded by: London Borough of Southwark
- Status: Civil parish (until 1965); Metropolitan borough (1900–1965)
- Government: Camberwell Vestry (1674–1900, reformed 1855); Camberwell Borough Council (1900–1965)
  - HQ: St Giles's Church (1674–1827); Vestry Hall, Havil Street (1827–1873); Vestry Hall, Peckham Road (1873–1934); Town Hall, Peckham Road (1934–1965)
  - Motto: All's well
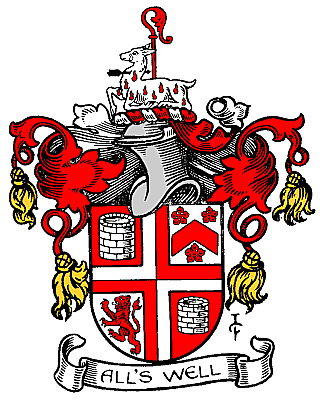
- Coat of arms of the borough council
- Map of borough boundary

Camberwell was a civil parish and metropolitan borough in south London, England. Camberwell was an ancient parish in the county of Surrey, governed by an administrative vestry from 1674. The parish was included in the area of responsibility of the Metropolitan Board of Works in 1855 and became part of the County of London in 1889. The parish of Camberwell became a metropolitan borough in 1900, following the London Government Act 1899, with the parish vestry replaced by a borough council. In 1965 the borough was abolished and its former area became part of the London Borough of Southwark in Greater London.

== Geography ==
The ancient parish of Camberwell and the three divisions of Camberwell, Dulwich and Peckham

The original parish of Camberwell St Giles had three divisions. They were the Liberty of Peckham to the east, the Hamlet of Dulwich to the southwest and the central division of Camberwell proper. The liberty of Peckham stretched from north of Old Kent Road to Honor Oak, taking in Peckham and Nunhead. Camberwell stretched from what is now Burgess Park in the north to what is now the Horniman Museum in the south, taking in the central Camberwell area around Camberwell Green, the eastern part of Herne Hill and East Dulwich. It included a long protrusion in the west, surrounded by Lambeth, as far as what is now Myatt's Fields Park. The hamlet of Dulwich stretched from Champion Hill in the north to what is now Crystal Palace in the south, taking in Dulwich Village, West Dulwich and Sydenham Hill.

In 1900 the Camberwell/Lambeth boundary was tidied up with an exchange of population (approximately 6,000 each way) which had the effect of transferring Myatt's Fields Park to Lambeth.

== Ecclesiastical parishes ==
The ancient parish, dedicated to St Giles, was in the Diocese of Winchester until 1877, then the Diocese of Rochester until 1905, and then finally in the Diocese of Southwark. From 1825, as the population of Camberwell increased, a number of new parishes were formed:

- St George, Camberwell In 1825
- Christ Church, Old Kent Road In 1838
- Emmanuel, Camberwell In 1842
- St Mary Magdalene, Peckham In 1842
- Camden Chapel, Camberwell In 1844
- St Matthew, Denmark Hill In 1848
- St Chrysostom, Peckham In 1865
- St John the Evangelist, East Dulwich In 1865
- St Andrew, Peckham In 1866
- St Peter, Dulwich Common In 1867
- St Stephen, South Dulwich In 1868
- All Saints, Blenheim Grove, Peckham In 1872
- St James, Knatchbull Road, Camberwell In 1874
- St Antony (formerly St Antholin), Nunhead In 1878
- St Luke, Rosemary Road, Peckham In 1878
- St Jude, Peckham In 1880
- St Saviour, Denmark Park In 1881
- St Mark, Peckham In 1884
- St Clement, East Dulwich In 1886
- St Batholemew, South Bermondsey In 1887
- All Saints, North Peckham In 1892
- St Barnabas, Dulwich In 1894
- St Silas, Nunhead In 1895

In addition, as the population of neighbouring areas increased, parts of Camberwell parish were included in new parishes:

- St Paul, Herne Hill In 1845 with parts of St Mary, Lambeth
- St Philip, Avondale Square In 1876 with parts of St Anne, Bermondsey
- St Mark, Camberwell In 1880 with parts of All Saints, Newington

== Coat of arms ==
The corporation was granted arms in 1901. The shield depicted the main areas of the borough. In the first and fourth quarter was a well, for Camberwell. The second quarter was for Dulwich: the chevron and cinquefoils from the arms of Edward Alleyn, founder of Alleyn's School. The third quarter represented Peckham: the lion was from the arms of Robert, Earl of Gloucester, one time lord of the manor.

The crest depicted a wounded hart, symbol of St Giles, patron saint of Camberwell.

In 1927 the borough was additionally granted an heraldic badge and standard. The badge depicted a Camberwell beauty butterfly.

== Politics ==
A map showing the wards of the Camberwell Metropolitan Borough as they appeared in 1916.

Under the Metropolis Management Act 1855 any parish that exceeded 2,000 ratepayers was to be divided into wards; as such the incorporated vestry of St Giles Camberwell was divided into six wards (electing vestrymen): No. 1 or St George's West (12), No. 2 or St George's East (12), No. 3 or Camden (12), No. 4 or North Peckham (15), No. 5 or South Peckham (15) and No. 6 or Camberwell & Dulwich (18).

In 1894 as its population had increased the incorporated vestry was re-divided into eight wards (electing vestrymen): St George's West (15), St George's East (12), Camden (12), North Peckham (21), South Peckham (21), North Dulwich (15), Central Dulwich (12) and South Dulwich (12).

The metropolitan borough was divided into twenty wards for elections: Addington, Alleyn, Clifton, Coburg, Goldsmith, Lyndhurst, Marlborough, North Peckham, Nunhead, Ruskin, Rye Lane, St George's, St Giles, St John's, St Mary's, The College, The Hamlet, The Rye, The West and Town Hall.

=== Borough council ===
From 1900 to 1934 the borough was controlled by the Municipal Reform Party (allied to the Conservatives). In 1934 the Labour Party gained control, which they retained until abolition in 1965.

=== Parliament constituency ===
For elections to Parliament, the borough was divided into three constituencies:

- Camberwell, Dulwich
- Camberwell, North
- Camberwell, Peckham

In 1918 the borough's representation was increased to four seats:

- Camberwell, Dulwich
- Camberwell, North
- Camberwell, North-West
- Camberwell, Peckham

In 1950 the number of seats was halved to 2:

- Camberwell, Dulwich
- Camberwell, Peckham

== Population and area ==
The area of the borough was 4,480 acres (18.1 km^{2}). The population, as recorded at the census, was:

Camberwell Vestry 1801–1899

Year	1801	1811	1821	1831	1841	1851	1861	1871	1881	1891
Population	7,059	11,309	17,876	28,231	39,868	54,667	71,488	111,306	186,593	235,344

Metropolitan Borough 1900–1961

Year	1901	1911	1921	1931	1941	1951	1961
Population	259,339	261,328	267,198	251,294		179,777	175,304
