= List of members of London County Council 1949–1965 =

This is a list of councillors and aldermen elected or co-opted to the London County Council from 1949 until its abolition in 1965.

The method of electing the council, and the electoral boundaries were altered by the Representation of the People Act 1948. The County of London was divided into electoral districts which were identical to the constituencies used to elected members of parliament (MPs) to the House of Commons. Until 1949 each electoral district returned two county councillors. The exception was the City of London, which had four county councillors and elected two MPs.

Under the 1948 legislation the number of constituencies in the county was reduced from sixty-one to forty-three due to population loss. Each electoral district, corresponding to the new constituencies, was to have three councillors. The number of elected councillors was thus 129. To this were added 21 aldermen who were chosen by the council. Aldermen had a six-year term of office, with half being chosen every three years at the first meeting following the election of councillors.

Elections on these boundaries were held in 1949 and 1952. Further boundary changes were made by the First Periodic Review of Westminster constituencies, coming into effect in 1955. This led to a net loss of one seat in the County of London, and a reduction in the number of councillors to 126, with the number of aldermen remaining at 21. Elections were held on the revised boundaries in 1955, 1958 and 1961.

Under the London Government Act 1963 the London County Council was to be abolished on 31 March 1965, and replaced by the Greater London Council (GLC), covering a larger area. The 1963 legislation cancelled the county council elections due in 1964, extending the term of office of councillors and aldermen until the abolition date. The elections to the first GLC were held in 1964, with the new council acting as a "shadow" authority until 1 April 1965. A number of county council members subsequently served on the GLC.

== Councillors 1949–1955 ==
Electoral division	Elected 7 April 1949	Party	Elected 3 April 1952	Party
Battersea North	Marjorie McIntosh	Labour	William Hare	Labour
Battersea North	Douglas Prichard	Labour	Douglas Prichard	Labour
Battersea North	Frederick Humphrey	Labour	Eric Hurst	Labour
Battersea South	John Morgan	Conservative	William S. Hodgson	Labour
Battersea South	Stewart Skingle	Conservative	Reginald Harold Plant	Labour
Battersea South	Frank L. Abbott	Conservative	Henry E. Stillman	Labour
Bermondsey	James Allan Gillison	Labour	John R. Thomas	Labour
Bermondsey	Reg Goodwin	Labour	Reg Goodwin	Labour
Bermondsey	Alfred John Kemp	Labour	Alfred John Kemp	Labour
Bethnal Green	Percy Harris	Liberal	Dorothy Holman	Labour
Bethnal Green	Beatrice Lilian Tate	Labour	Beatrice Lilian Tate	Labour
Bethnal Green	Ronald McKinnon Wood	Labour	Ronald McKinnon Wood	Labour
Camberwell Dulwich	Alida G. R. Brittain (married Major John Harvie in October 1950 and known as Mrs. Harvie thereafter)	Conservative	Amy L. Crossman	Labour
Camberwell Dulwich	Ronald Hamilton Hensman	Conservative	Wilfrid Vernon	Labour
Camberwell Dulwich	Charles Pearce	Conservative	Charles Pearce	Conservative
Camberwell Peckham	Freda Corbet	Labour	Freda Corbet	Labour
Camberwell Peckham	Richard Sargood	Labour	Richard Sargood	Labour
Camberwell Peckham	Cecil Manning (resigned 30 August 1950); Arthur Skeffington (elected at by-election 28 September 1950)	Labour	Arthur Skeffington	Labour
Chelsea	Alexander Lloyd	Conservative	Roderick Latimer Mackenzie Edwards	Conservative
Chelsea	Catherine Fulford	Conservative	Marion Patricia Bennett	Conservative
Chelsea	John Vaughan-Morgan	Conservative	Geoffrey Rippon	Conservative
Cities of London and Westminster	Henry Brooke	Conservative	Henry Brooke	Conservative
Cities of London and Westminster	Denys Lowson	Conservative	Ralph Perring	Conservative
Cities of London and Westminster	Samuel Isidore Salmon	Conservative	Samuel Isidore Salmon	Conservative
Deptford	William James Coombs	Labour	Alfred Seabrook Simons	Labour
Deptford	Isaac Hayward	Labour	Isaac Hayward (seat became vacant 1 February 1955 when Hayward elected alderman)	Labour
Deptford	Ernest C. Sherwood	Labour	Harold Shearman	Labour
Fulham East	Lilian Madge Dugdale	Conservative	John Cronin	Labour
Fulham East	Stephen Garvin	Conservative	Hilda Selwyn-Clarke	Labour
Fulham East	Anthony Sumption	Conservative	William A. Cuthbertson	Labour
Fulham West	Frank Banfield	Labour	Frank Banfield	Labour
Fulham West	Ethel Rankin	Labour	Ethel Rankin	Labour
Fulham West	Ian Mactaggart	Conservative	Richard Edmonds	Labour
Greenwich	Johanna Gollogly	Labour	Johanna Gollogly	Labour
Greenwich	Arthur C. Chrisp	Labour	Arthur C. Chrisp	Labour
Greenwich	Bernard Sullivan	Labour	Bernard Sullivan	Labour
Hackney South	Bernard Homa	Labour	Bernard Homa	Labour
Hackney South	Peggy Jay	Labour	Hilary Halpin	Labour
Hackney South	Reginald Day	Labour	Mary Ormerod	Labour
Hammersmith North	Edward Ernest Woods	Labour	Edward Ernest Woods	Labour
Hammersmith North	Jane Phillips	Labour	Jane Phillips	Labour
Hammersmith North	Reginald James Buckingham	Labour	Norman Prichard	Labour
Hammersmith South	John Melbourne Howard	Conservative	Ena Daniels	Labour
Hammersmith South	Leslie Frank Ramseyer	Conservative	Fred Tonge	Labour
Hammersmith South	Anthony Dalmain	Conservative	Audrey Lees	Labour
Hampstead	John Fremantle	Conservative	John Fremantle	Conservative
Hampstead	William Steer	Conservative	Doris R. Bailey	Conservative
Hampstead	Geoffrey Hutchinson	Conservative	Randolph Joseph Cleaver	Conservative
Holborn and St Pancras South	Marion Patricia Bennett	Conservative	Lena Jeger	Labour
Holborn and St Pancras South	Albert Walker Scott	Conservative	Ronald Gilbey	Conservative
Holborn and St Pancras South	Arthur G. Warne	Conservative	Arthur G. Warne	Conservative
Islington East	Irene Chaplin	Labour	Irene Chaplin	Labour
Islington East	Edwin Bayliss	Labour	Edwin Bayliss	Labour
Islington East	Bernard Bagnari	Labour	Bernard Bagnari	Labour
Islington North	Eva E. Bull	Labour	Eva E. Bull	Labour
Islington North	Charles William Pope	Labour	Charles William Pope	Labour
Islington North	Arthur Edward Middleton	Labour	Hazel Rose	Labour
Islington South West	Duncan McArthur Jackson	Labour	Fred Powe	Labour
Islington South West	Hugh Rush Jones	Labour	Hugh Rush Jones	Labour
Islington South West	George Percival Wright	Labour	Reginald Stamp	Labour
Kensington North	Denis Charles Griffiths (died 15 September 1949)	Conservative	Olive M Wilson	Labour
Kensington North	Jack Cooper (Elected at byelection 3 November 1949)	Labour	Olive M Wilson	Labour
Kensington North	Edith Victoria Winifred Deakin	Conservative	Anna Lloyd Grieves	Labour
Kensington North	Francis J. Clark	Conservative	Donald Piers Chesworth	Labour
Kensington South	Cecilia Petrie	Conservative	Cecilia Petrie	Conservative
Kensington South	Elizabeth Evelyn Pepler	Conservative	Elizabeth Evelyn Pepler	Conservative
Kensington South	Ian Harvey	Conservative	John Gerald Gapp	Conservative
Lambeth, Brixton	Victor Mishcon	Labour	Victor Mishcon	Labour
Lambeth, Brixton	Walter Guy Robert Boys	Labour	Walter Guy Robert Boys (resigned 1 February 1954) Beatrice Serota (elected unopposed 18 March 1954)	Labour
Lambeth, Brixton	Donald F. W. Ford	Labour	Donald F. W. Ford	Labour
Lambeth Norwood	Aubrey Stapleton	Conservative	Percy Fender	Conservative
Lambeth Norwood	Margery Thornton	Conservative	Margery Thornton	Conservative
Lambeth Norwood	Ronald Russell	Conservative	Wilfrid Bateman	Conservative
Lambeth Vauxhall	Patricia Strauss	Labour	Patricia Strauss	Labour
Lambeth Vauxhall	Charles Gibson	Labour	Charles Gibson	Labour
Lambeth Vauxhall	Howell John Powell	Labour	Kythé Caroline Hendy	Labour
Lewisham North	Norman W. Farmer	Conservative	Norman W. Farmer	Conservative
Lewisham North	Pearl Hulbert	Conservative	Irene Phyllis Rose	Conservative
Lewisham North	John Martin Oakey	Conservative	John Martin Oakey	Conservative
Lewisham South	Walter Richard Owen	Labour	Walter Richard Owen	Labour
Lewisham South	Edmund Henry Hambly	Labour	Edmund Henry Hambly	Labour
Lewisham South	Tom Gillinder	Labour	Tom Gillinder	Labour
Lewisham West	Henry A. Price	Conservative	Colin H. Mann	Conservative
Lewisham West	Florence Mary Ruston	Conservative	Florence Mary Ruston	Conservative
Lewisham West	George Rowland Durston Bradfield	Conservative	George Rowland Durston Bradfield	Conservative
Paddington North	Ernest Hyatt	Conservative	Edward Avery	Labour
Paddington North	David A. Wilkie	Conservative	Myfanwy Griffith	Labour
Paddington North	Mary Proby (Married William Fletcher-Vane 28 July 1949 and known as Mrs Fletcher-Vane thereafter)	Conservative	J. O'Neill Ryan	Labour
Paddington South	Frederick Lawrence	Conservative	Frederick Lawrence	Conservative
Paddington South	Thelma de Chair	Conservative	Thelma de Chair	Conservative
Paddington South	Norris Kenyon	Conservative	Norris Kenyon (knighted 1955)	Conservative
Poplar	William Henry Guy	Labour	William Henry Guy	Labour
Poplar	Frederick Thomas Baldock	Labour	Arthur Niederman	Labour
Poplar	John Branagan	Labour	John Branagan	Labour
St Marylebone	Lucy Frances Nettlefold	Conservative	Lucy Frances Nettlefold	Conservative
St Marylebone	Alfred Edward Reneson Coucher	Conservative	Alfred Edward Reneson Coucher	Conservative
St Marylebone	Derek Webster	Conservative	Ronald Charles Orpen	Conservative
St Pancras North	Shaikh Ghisaud Dean	Labour	Shaikh Ghisaud Dean	Labour
St Pancras North	Iris Bonham	Labour	Iris Bonham	Labour
St Pancras North	Evelyn Denington	Labour	Evelyn Denington	Labour
Shoreditch and Finsbury	William Lewis Prowse	Labour	Donald Daines	Labour
Shoreditch and Finsbury	Robert Jefferson Tallantire	Labour	Arthur Wicks	Labour
Shoreditch and Finsbury	Charles Simmons	Labour	Florence Cayford	Labour
Southwark	Albert Bernard Kennedy	Labour	Albert Bernard Kennedy	Labour
Southwark	John Keen	Labour	John Keen	Labour
Southwark	James Hyndman MacDonnell	Labour	James Hyndman MacDonnell	Labour
Stepney	Jack Oldfield	Labour	Jack Oldfield	Labour
Stepney	Jeremiah Long	Labour	Jeremiah Long	Labour
Stepney	Louise Reeve	Labour	Louise Reeve	Labour
Stoke Newington and Hackney North	Molly Bolton	Labour	George Edward Hayes	Labour
Stoke Newington and Hackney North	Mark Auliff	Labour	Albert Samuels	Labour
Stoke Newington and Hackney North	Henry Norris	Labour	Neville Sandelson	Labour
Wandsworth Central	Ronald Wates	Conservative	Eleanor Goodrich	Labour
Wandsworth Central	Irene Burnett	Conservative	Annie Alice Wilson	Labour
Wandsworth Central	John Taylor Clarke	Conservative	George Edwards	Labour
Wandsworth Clapham	William Charles Bonney	Conservative	Leslie Banks	Labour
Wandsworth Clapham	Irene Dowling	Conservative	James Benjamin Hayward	Labour
Wandsworth Clapham	Neville Rayner	Conservative	Christina Lawrence	Labour
Wandsworth Putney	Deodora Croft	Conservative	Deodora Croft	Conservative
Wandsworth Putney	Frank Headland East	Conservative	Frank Headland East	Conservative
Wandsworth Putney	Herbert Ryan	Conservative	Frederick Swinbourn	Conservative
Wandsworth Streatham	George Mitchell	Conservative	George Mitchell	Conservative
Wandsworth Streatham	Patrick Stirling	Conservative	Patrick Stirling	Conservative
Wandsworth Streatham	Alfred Frederick Hopkinson	Conservative	Gladys Rodwell Norris	Conservative
Woolwich East	Henry Berry	Labour	Henry Berry	Labour
Woolwich East	Ethel Maud Newman	Labour	John Andrews	Labour
Woolwich East	Mabel Crout	Labour	Mabel Crout	Labour
Woolwich West	Francis William Beech	Conservative	Francis William Beech	Conservative
Woolwich West	Unity Lister	Conservative	Charles Salter	Labour
Woolwich West	William Steward	Conservative	Daisy Maud Munns	Labour

== Councillors 1955–1965 ==
* Elected to the successor Greater London Council 1964 † Appointed an alderman on the successor Greater London Council 1964

Electoral division	Elected 31 March 1955	Party	Elected 16 April 1958	Party	Elected 13 April 1961	Party
Barons Court	Frank Banfield	Labour	Frank Banfield	Labour	Frank Banfield†	Labour
Barons Court	Bill Fiske	Labour	Bill Fiske	Labour	Bill Fiske*	Labour
Barons Court	Lilian Madge Dugdale	Conservative	Audrey Lees	Labour	Audrey Lees	Labour
Battersea North	William Hare	Labour	Helen S Kiely	Labour	Helen S Kiely	Labour
Battersea North	Douglas A G Prichard	Labour	Douglas A G Prichard	Labour	Joseph Simeon Samuels*	Labour
Battersea North	Eric Hurst	Labour	Eric Hurst	Labour	Peggy Jay*	Labour
Battersea South	Douglas Rayment	Conservative	Harbans Lall Gulati	Labour	Ian N Samuel	Conservative
Battersea South	A C Marshall	Conservative	Peggy Jay	Labour	Muriel Bowen	Conservative
Battersea South	Frank Lewis Abbott	Conservative	Marie Jenkins	Labour	Frank Lewis Abbott*	Conservative
Bermondsey	J R Thomas	Labour	J R Thomas	Labour	J R Thomas	Labour
Bermondsey	Reg Goodwin	Labour	Reg Goodwin	Labour	Albert Samuels*	Labour
Bermondsey	Alfred John Kemp	Labour	Alfred John Kemp	Labour	Alfred John Kemp	Labour
Bethnal Green	Dorothy Holman	Liberal	Dorothy Holman	Labour	Dorothy Holman	Labour
Bethnal Green	B L Tate	Labour	B L Tate	Labour	A McLaughlin	Labour
Bethnal Green	Ronald McKinnon Wood	Labour	Ronald McKinnon Wood	Labour	Ashley Bramall*	Labour
Camberwell Dulwich	Martin Stevens	Conservative	Henry George Lamborn	Labour	Henry George Lamborn*	Labour
Camberwell Dulwich	Ronald Hamilton Hensman	Conservative	Albert Murray	Labour	Albert Murray	Labour
Camberwell Dulwich	Charles Pearce	Conservative	Edgar Ernest Reed	Labour	Edgar Ernest Reed*	Labour
Camberwell Peckham	Freda Corbet	Labour	Freda Corbet	Labour	Freda Corbet	Labour
Camberwell Peckham	Richard Sargood	Labour	Richard Sargood	Labour	Richard Sargood	Labour
Camberwell Peckham	Arthur Skeffington	Labour	Walter R Allen	Labour	Walter R Allen	Labour
Chelsea	Roderick Latimer Mackenzie Edwards	Conservative	Stuart Townend	Conservative	Stuart Townend	Conservative
Chelsea	Marion Patricia Bennett	Conservative	Marion Patricia Bennett	Conservative	Percy Rugg*	Conservative
Chelsea	Geoffrey Rippon	Conservative	Geoffrey Rippon	Conservative	John Elliott Brooks	Conservative
Cities of London and Westminster	John Chapman-Walker	Conservative	Victor Goodhew	Conservative	Alison M Tennant	Conservative
Cities of London and Westminster	Hubert Percival Lancaster Pitman	Conservative	James Miller	Conservative	James Miller	Conservative
Cities of London and Westminster	Samuel Isidore Salmon (Knighted 1960)	Conservative	Samuel Isidore Salmon (knighted 1960)	Conservative	Samuel Isidore Salmon*	Conservative
Deptford	Alfred Seabrook Simons	Labour	Alfred Seabrook Simons	Labour	Alfred Seabrook Simons	Labour
Deptford	Eugene Murphy	Labour	Eugene Murphy	Labour	Albert John Blackman	Labour
Deptford	Harold Shearman	Labour	Harold Shearman	Labour	Harold Shearman*	Labour
Fulham	Ethel Rankin (died March 1957); Walter Rankin (elected at byelection 30 May 1957)	Labour	Walter Rankin	Labour	Walter Rankin	Labour
Fulham	Richard Edmonds	Labour	Richard Edmonds	Labour	Richard Edmonds*	Labour
Fulham	Hilda Selwyn-Clarke	Labour	Hilda Selwyn-Clarke	Labour	Hilda Selwyn-Clarke	Labour
Greenwich	Peggy Middleton	Labour	Peggy Middleton	Labour	Peggy Middleton	Labour
Greenwich	Arthur C Chrisp	Labour	Arthur C Chrisp	Labour	Arthur C Chrisp	Labour
Greenwich	Thomas H P Beacham	Labour	Julia Ada Johnson	Labour	Julia Ada Johnson*	Labour
Hackney Central	John C Wobey	Labour	John C Wobey	Labour	Ellis Hillman*	Labour
Hackney Central	Hilary Halpin	Labour	Harry Rezler	Labour	Harry Rezler	Labour
Hackney Central	Mary Ormerod	Labour	Mary Ormerod	Labour	Lou Sherman	Labour
Hammersmith North	Edward Ernest Woods	Labour	Edward Ernest Woods	Labour	Edward Ernest Woods	Labour
Hammersmith North	Jane Phillips	Labour	Jane Phillips	Labour	Jane Phillips*	Labour
Hammersmith North	Norman Prichard	Labour	Norman Prichard	Labour	Norman Prichard*	Labour
Hampstead	Francis Ernest Herman Bennett	Conservative	Francis Ernest Herman Bennett	Conservative	Francis Ernest Herman Bennett†	Conservative
Hampstead	Lena Townsend	Conservative	Lena Townsend	Conservative	Lena Townsend	Conservative
Hampstead	Randolph Joseph Cleaver	Conservative	Randolph Joseph Cleaver	Conservative	Randolph Joseph Cleaver	Conservative
Holborn and St Pancras South	Isita Clare Mansel	Conservative	Tom Braddock	Labour	Edward Kellett-Bowman	Conservative
Holborn and St Pancras South	Henry Norman Edwards	Conservative	Leila Campbell	Labour	Leila Campbell*	Labour
Holborn and St Pancras South	Ronald Gilbey	Conservative	Louis William Bondy	Labour	Louis William Bondy*	Labour
Islington East	Irene Chaplin	Labour	Irene Chaplin	Labour	Irene Chaplin*	Labour
Islington East	Edwin Bayliss	Labour	Edwin Bayliss	Labour	Edwin Bayliss*	Labour
Islington East	Bernard Bagnari	Labour	Bernard Bagnari	Labour	Bernard Bagnari	Labour
Islington North	Eva E Bull	Labour	Eva E Bull	Labour	Eva E Bull	Labour
Islington North	C W Pope	Labour	C W Pope	Labour	C W Pope	Labour
Islington North	Hazel Corinne Rose	Labour	Hazel Corinne Rose	Labour	Hazel Corinne Rose	Labour
Islington South West	Fred Powe	Labour	Fred Powe	Labour	Fred Powe*	Labour
Islington South West	Hugh Rush Jones (died 11 April 1956); Herbert James Lowton Lygoe (elected unopposed 5 July 1956)	Labour	Herbert James Lowton Lygoe	Labour	Herbert James Lowton Lygoe	Labour
Islington South West	A Reginald Stamp	Labour	A Reginald Stamp	Labour	A Reginald Stamp	Labour
Kensington North	Olive M Wilson	Labour	Olive M Wilson	Labour	Olive M Wilson	Labour
Kensington North	Donald Piers Chesworth	Labour	Donald Piers Chesworth	Labour	Donald Piers Chesworth	Labour
Kensington North	Anna Lloyd Grieves	Labour	Anna Lloyd Grieves	Labour	Anna Lloyd Grieves	Labour
Kensington South	Cecilia Petrie	Conservative	Cecelia Petrie	Conservative	Cecelia Petrie	Conservative
Kensington South	Elizabeth Evelyn Pepler	Conservative	Elizabeth Evelyn Pepler	Conservative	John O Udal	Conservative
Kensington South	Robert Lewis Vigars	Conservative	Robert Lewis Vigars	Conservative	Robert Lewis Vigars*	Conservative
Lambeth, Brixton	Victor Mishcon	Labour	Victor Mishcon	Labour	Victor Mishcon*	Labour
Lambeth, Brixton	Beatrice Serota	Labour	Beatrice Serota	Labour	Beatrice Serota*	Labour
Lambeth, Brixton	Donald F W Ford	Labour	Donald F W Ford	Labour	Nathan Marock	Labour
Lambeth Norwood	Percy Fender	Conservative	Ellis Hillman	Labour	William Wycliffe Livingston	Conservative
Lambeth Norwood	Margery Thornton	Conservative	Robert William G Humphreys	Labour	Lucille Iremonger	Conservative
Lambeth Norwood	J Wilfrid Bateman	Conservative	Nancy Silverman	Labour	John Patten	Conservative
Lambeth Vauxhall	Patricia Strauss	Labour	Sidney Aubrey Melman	Labour	Sidney Aubrey Melman*	Labour
Lambeth Vauxhall	William Walter Begley	Labour	William Walter Begley	Labour	William Walter Begley	Labour
Lambeth Vauxhall	Kythé Caroline Hendy	Labour	Kythé Caroline Hendy	Labour	Ewan Geddes Carr	Labour
Lewisham North	Norman W Farmer	Conservative	Norman W Farmer	Conservative	Norman W Farmer	Conservative
Lewisham North	Irene Phyllis Rose	Conservative	Christopher Chataway	Conservative	Irene Phyllis Rose	Conservative
Lewisham North	John Martin Oakey	Conservative	Audrey Callaghan	Labour	Antony Thomas Reid Fletcher	Conservative
Lewisham South	Walter Richard Owen	Labour	F E G Hawes	Labour	F E G Hawes	Labour
Lewisham South	Edmund Henry Hambly	Labour	Edmund Henry Hambly	Labour	Edmund Henry Hambly; In August 1961 Hambly resigned from the Labour Party, serving the remainder of his term as a member of the Liberal Party	Labour
Lewisham South	Edmund Henry Hambly	Labour	Edmund Henry Hambly	Labour	Edmund Henry Hambly; In August 1961 Hambly resigned from the Labour Party, serving the remainder of his term as a member of the Liberal Party	Liberal
Lewisham South	Tom Gillinder	Labour	Tom Gillinder	Labour	Tom Gillinder	Labour
Lewisham West	Colin H Mann	Conservative	Raine Spencer	Conservative	Raine Spencer	Conservative
Lewisham West	Florence Mary Ruston	Conservative	Betty D Vernon	Labour	Norman Dinsdale Banks	Conservative
Lewisham West	George Rowland Durston Bradfield	Conservative	George Rowland Durston Bradfield	Conservative	George Rowland Durston Bradfield	Conservative
Paddington North	Edward Avery	Labour	Edward Avery	Labour	Edward Avery	Labour
Paddington North	M Griffith	Labour	M Griffith	Labour	George Lowe	Labour
Paddington North	J O'Neill Ryan	Labour	J O'Neill Ryan	Labour	H E Browne	Labour
Paddington South	Frederick Lawrence	Conservative	Frederick Lawrence	Conservative	Frederick Lawrence	Conservative
Paddington South	Edward Bigham (succeeded to title of Viscount Mersey 20 November 1956)	Conservative	Edward Bingham	Conservative	Edward Bingham	Conservative
Paddington South	Norris Kenyon	Conservative	Norris Kenyon (died 28 April 1958) Montagu William Lowry-Corry (elected at by-election 25 June 1958)	Conservative	Montagu William Lowry-Corry	Conservative
Poplar	William Henry Guy	Labour	William Henry Guy	Labour	William Henry Guy	Labour
Poplar	Arthur C Niederman	Labour	Arthur C Niederman	Labour	Arthur C Niederman	Labour
Poplar	John Patrick Branagan	Labour	John Patrick Branagan	Labour	John Patrick Branagan*	Labour
St Marylebone	Lucy Frances Nettlefold	Conservative	Lucy Frances Nettlefold (resigned 26 March 1960) Desmond Plummer (elected unopposed 5 May 1960)	Conservative	Desmond Plummer*	Conservative
St Marylebone	Alfred Edward Reneson Coucher (died 23 May 1955) Louis Gluckstein (elected unopposed 21 July 1955)	Conservative	Louis Gluckstein	Conservative	Louis Gluckstein*	Conservative
St Marylebone	Geoffrey Miles Clifford	Conservative	Winston J L Drapkin	Conservative	Winston J L Drapkin	Conservative
St Pancras North	S G Dean	Labour	Frederick Lionel Tonge	Labour	Frederick Lionel Tonge	Labour
St Pancras North	Iris Mary Caroline Bonham	Labour	Grace F Lee	Labour	Grace F Lee	Labour
St Pancras North	Evelyn Denington	Labour	Evelyn Denington	Labour	Evelyn Denington	Labour
Shoreditch and Finsbury	Donald Daines	Labour	Olive Deer	Labour	Olive Deer	Labour
Shoreditch and Finsbury	Arthur Wicks	Labour	Arthur Wicks	Labour	Arthur Wicks*	Labour
Shoreditch and Finsbury	Florence Cayford	Labour	Florence Cayford	Labour	Florence Cayford*	Labour
Southwark	H E Stillman	Labour	H E Stillman	Labour	H E Stillman	Labour
Southwark	John J Keen	Labour	John J Keen	Labour	John J Keen	Labour
Southwark	Leonard James Styles	Labour	Leonard James Styles	Labour	Albert J Gates	Labour
Stepney	Jack Oldfield	Mrs A P King	Jack Oldfield	Labour	A P King	Labour
Stepney	J J A Long	Labour	A D Kirby	Labour	A D Kirby	Labour
Stepney	A Louise Reeve	Labour	A E Sealey	Labour	Cyril Willey Jerome Bird	Labour
Stoke Newington and Hackney North	Helen Bentwich	Labour	Hugh Jenkins	Labour	Hugh Jenkins	Labour
Stoke Newington and Hackney North	Albert Samuels	Labour	Albert Samuels	Labour	David Pitt*	Labour
Stoke Newington and Hackney North	Neville Sandelson	Labour	B A Payton	Labour	B A Payton	Labour
Wandsworth Central	Lance Victor McLeish Cocker	Conservative	David Kerr	Labour	David Kerr	Labour
Wandsworth Central	Martin Garneys Bond	Conservative	George Frederick Rowe	Labour	George Frederick Rowe*	Labour
Wandsworth Central	Alison M Tennant	Conservative	Hugh Sutherland	Labour	Hugh Sutherland (Died 12 November 1962); Joan Lestor (Elected 13 December 1962)	Labour
Wandsworth Clapham	Muriel Gumbel	Conservative	Leslie G Banks	Labour	W W Emden	Conservative
Wandsworth Clapham	Francis E Hadwen	Conservative	Winifred Katz	Labour	Ursula Tracey	Conservative
Wandsworth Clapham	Geoffrey M A Mowbray	Conservative	T D Cranfield	Labour	Lintorn Trevor Highett	Conservative
Wandsworth Putney	Deodora Croft	Conservative	J A Parker	Labour	John Ian Tweedie-Smith	Conservative
Wandsworth Putney	Frank Headland East (died 10 October 1955) Geoffrey Johnson Smith (elected at by-election 24 November 1955)	Conservative	Anne Clark (married James Doran Clark in 1960 and known as Anne Kerr thereafter)	Labour	Anne Kerr	Labour
Wandsworth Putney	Eileen R Hoare	Conservative	David Tutaev	Labour	Eileen R Hoare	Conservative
Wandsworth Streatham	Harold H Sebag-Montefiore	Conservative	Harold H Sebag-Montefiore	Conservative	Gerard Folliott Vaughan	Conservative
Wandsworth Streatham	Ian C McLean	Conservative	Ian C McLean	Conservative	Frederick Walter Weyer	Conservative
Wandsworth Streatham	Percy Valentine Gale	Conservative	Percy Valentine Gale	Conservative	Percy Valentine Gale	Conservative
Woolwich East	Walter H A O A Stein	Labour	Walter H A O A Stein	Labour	Walter H A O A Stein	Labour
Woolwich East	John William Andrews	Labour	John William Andrews	Labour	John William Andrews*	Labour
Woolwich East	James Young	Labour	James Young	Labour	James Young*	Labour
Woolwich West	Leslie J Smith	Conservative	Constance U Cole	Labour	Evelyn R M Middleton	Conservative
Woolwich West	Unity Lister	Conservative	Gavin Henderson	Labour	Unity Lister	Conservative
Woolwich West	H Brian S Warren	Conservative	Mair Garside	Labour	Michael G Wayman	Conservative

== County aldermen 1949–1965 ==
Aldermen retiring in 1946 had originally been elected for 1934–1940, those retiring in 1949 had been elected for 1937–1943.

Term	Alderman	Party	Notes
1946–1952	Donald Daines	Labour	Became an elected councillor in 1952
1946–1950	Emil Davies (died 18 July 1950)	Labour	Became an elected councillor in 1952
1946–1952	Florence Cayford	Labour	Became an elected councillor in 1952
1946–1952	Walter Green	Labour	
1946 – 1952, 1952 – 1958, 1958 – 1965	Somerville Hastings	Labour	
1946 – 1952, 1952 – 1955	Reginald Stamp	Labour	Became an elected councillor in 1955
1946–1952	Tom Wheeler	Labour	
1946–1952	Harold Shearman	Labour	Became an elected councillor in 1952
1949 – 1955, 1958 – 1965	Helen Bentwich	Labour	Formerly a councillor: became an elected councillor again in 1955 – 1958.
1949 – 1955, 1955 – 1960	Leonard Foster Browne (died 15 May 1960)	Labour	Formerly a councillor
1949 – 1955, 1955 – 1961, 1961 – 1965	Richard Coppock (knighted 1951)	Labour	Formerly a councillor
1949 – 1955	Vera Dart	Labour	Formerly a councillor
1949 – 1955	Bill Fiske	Labour	Formerly a councillor: became an elected councillor again in 1955
1949 – 1955	Leah L'Estrange Malone (died 4 September 1951)	Labour	Re-elected
1949 – 1955	John Hare (resigned 4 April 1952)	Conservative	Re-elected
1949 – 1955	Eileen Hoare	Conservative	Became an elected councillor in 1955
1949 – 1955	Barrie Lambert (resigned 27 February 1952)	Conservative	Re-elected
1949 – 1955, 1955 – 1961	Norah Runge	Conservative	Re-elected
1949 – 1955	Theodore Magnus Wechsler (resigned 16 September 1952)	Conservative	Formerly a councillor
1950–1952	Norman Prichard (in place of Davies 10 October 1950)	Labour	Became an elected councillor in 1952
1951 – 1955, 1955 – 1961	John William Bowen (in place of Malone 9 October 1951)	Labour	A councillor until 1949, remained a member of the council as chairman 1949 – 1951 without being either a councillor or alderman
1952 – 1955, 1955 – 1958	Catherine Fulford (in place of Lambert 4 March 1952) (resigned 22 October 1958)	Conservative	Formerly a councillor
1952–1955	John Howard (in place of Hare 9 April 1952) (resigned 15 January 1954)	Conservative	Formerly a councillor, defeated at 1952 election
1952–1955	Edith Victoria Winifred Deakin (in place of Wechsler 7 October 1952)	Conservative	Formerly a councillor, defeated at 1952 election
1952 – 1958, 1958 – 1965	Molly Bolton	Labour	Formerly a councillor
1952–1958	Francis J. Clark (resigned 3 October 1956)	Conservative	Formerly a councillor
1952 – 1958, 1958 – 1965	Margaret Cole	Labour	
1952–1958	Jack Cooper (resigned 3 November 1953)	Labour	Formerly a councillor
1952–1958	Olive Deer	Labour	Became an elected councillor in 1958
1952–1958	Duncan McArthur Jackson (died 26 December 1954)	Labour	Formerly a councillor
1952–1958	Arthur Edward Middleton (died 19 October 1953)	Labour	Formerly a councillor
1952 – 1958, 1958 – 1965	Eleanor Nathan	Labour	Formerly a councillor until 1949
1952 – 1958, 1958 – 1964	George Percival Wright (died 25 January 1964)	Labour	Formerly a councillor
1953 – 1958, 1958 – 1965	Sidney Barton (in place of Middleton 3 November 1953)	Labour	
1953–1958	Anthony Blake (in place of Cooper 17 November 1953)	Labour	
1954 – 1955, 1955 – 1961	Martin Willoughby Parr (in place of Howard 2 February 1954)	Conservative	
1955 – 1958, 1958 – 1965	Isaac Hayward (in place of Cooper 1 February 1955)	Labour	Formerly a councillor
1955–1961	Eleanor Goodrich	Labour	Formerly a councillor
1955 – 1961, 1961 – 1965	James Mantle Greenwood (knighted 1962)	Conservative	
1955–1961	George Folliott Vaughan	Conservative	Became an elected councillor in 1961
1955 – 1961, 1961 – 1965	Nelly Margaret Walton	Conservative	
1955–1961	Lancelot Lionel Ware	Conservative	
1956 – 1958, 1961 – 1965	Bill Carr (in place of Clark 9 October 1956)	Conservative	
1958–1961	Percy Rugg (in place of Fulford 4 November 1958) (knighted as "Sir Percy Rugg" 1959)	Conservative	Became an elected councillor in 1961
1958 – 1964	Marjorie McIntosh (died 6 May 1964)	Labour	Formerly a councillor
1958 – 1965	Donald Soper†	Labour	
1960 – 1961, 1964 – 1965	Charles Gibson (in place of Browne 21 June 1960) (in place of Gardiner 28 January 1964)	Labour	Formerly a councillor
1961–1962	Martin Garneys Bond (resigned 21 August 1962)	Conservative	Previously a councillor
1961–1964	Gerald Gardiner (resigned 2 January 1964)	Labour	
1961–1965	Reg Goodwin*	Labour	Formerly an elected councillor
1961–1965	Elizabeth Evelyn Pepler	Conservative	Previously a councillor
1961–1965	Gavin Henderson	Labour	Previously a councillor
1961–1965	Isita Clare Mansel	Conservative	Previously a councillor until 1958
1961–1965	Harold Sebag-Montefiore*	Conservative	Previously a councillor
1962–1965	Brian Warren (in place of Bond 2 October 1962)	Conservative	Previously a councillor until 1961
1964–1965	Victor Shaw (in place of Wright 11 February 1964)	Labour	
1964–1965	Elizabeth Bacharach (in place of McIntosh 2 June 1964)	Labour	

== See also ==
- List of members of London County Council 1889–1919
- List of members of London County Council 1919–1937
- List of members of London County Council 1937–1949
- List of chairmen of the London County Council
