= List of members of London County Council 1937–1949 =

This is a list of councillors and aldermen elected to the London County Council from 1937 to 1949.

Elections of all councillors on the London County Council were scheduled to be held every three years. Following the outbreak of the Second World War, the elections due in 1940 were cancelled. Vacant seats were filled by co-option under the terms of the emergency Local Elections and Register of Electors (Temporary Provisions) Act 1939 until the electoral cycle was resumed in 1946.

The size of the council was 124 councillors and 20 aldermen. The councillors were elected for electoral divisions corresponding to the parliamentary constituencies that had been created by the Representation of the People Act 1918, with two councillors for each division. Aldermen were elected by the council itself, and served for a six-year term of office. Half of the aldermen were chosen every three years at the first meeting of the newly elected council. Like the councillors, vacancies on the aldermanic bench thereafter were filled by co-option during the war.

== Councillors 1937–1949 ==
Electoral division	Elected 4 March 1937	Party	Co-opted under the Local Elections and Register of Electors (Temporary Provisions) Act 1939	Party	Elected 7 March 1946	Party
City of London	Angus Newton Scott (resigned 17 July 1941)	Municipal Reform	Arthur Charles Bonsor (23 September 1941)	Municipal Reform	Arthur Charles Bonsor	Conservative
City of London	Percy Simmons (died 19 September 1939)	Municipal Reform	Harold Webbe (6 February 1940)	Municipal Reform	Harold Webbe	Conservative
City of London	George Henry Wilkinson (created baronet 1941) (resigned 23 February 1944)	Municipal Reform	Harry Twyford (7 March 1944)	Municipal Reform	Seymour Howard	Conservative
City of London	William Wilson Grantham (died 18 February 1942)	Municipal Reform	John Musker (21 April 1942)	Municipal Reform	John Musker (resigned 13 October 1947); Angus Mackinnon (elected unopposed 19 October 1947)	Conservative
Battersea North	Francis Douglas	Labour	NO CHANGE	Labour	Douglas Prichard	Labour
Battersea North	Ewart Culpin	Labour	NO CHANGE	Labour	J. S. Wilkie (died 23 July 1947); Marjorie McIntosh (elected 23 October 1947)	Labour
Battersea South	Charles James Allpass	Municipal Reform	NO CHANGE	Municipal Reform	David Rapoport	Labour
Battersea South	Viscount Curzon	Municipal Reform	NO CHANGE	Municipal Reform	Dorothy Archibald	Labour
Bermondsey Rotherhithe	Albert Charles Starr	Labour	NO CHANGE	Labour	Albert Charles Starr	Labour
Bermondsey Rotherhithe	James Allan Gillison	Labour	NO CHANGE	Labour	James Allan Gillison	Labour
Bermondsey West	Eveline Lowe	Labour	NO CHANGE	Labour	Reg Goodwin	Labour
Bermondsey West	Ada Salter (resigned 6 October 1941)	Labour	Leslie Davison (resigned 14 August 1944); Edward Snowdon (appointed 10 October 1944)	Labour	Edward Snowdon	Labour
Bethnal Green North East	Rachel Susanna Keeling Resigned 19 March 1941	Labour	Wyndham Deedes; Co-opted 29 July 1941	Labour	Helen Bentwich ‡	Labour
Bethnal Green North East	Thomas Dawson	Labour	NO CHANGE	Labour	Ronald McKinnon Wood	Labour
Bethnal Green South West	John Edward Anthony King	Labour	NO CHANGE	Labour	Percy Harris	Liberal
Bethnal Green South West	Reginald Stamp	Labour	NO CHANGE	Labour	Edward Martell	Liberal
Camberwell Dulwich	Frederick Charles Eaton (died 17 October 1938) Charles Pearce (elected unopposed 24 November 1938)	Municipal Reform	NO CHANGE	Municipal Reform	Charles Pearce	Conservative
Camberwell Dulwich	Viscount Sandon (resigned 1940)	Municipal Reform	Frank Griffiths Woollard (appointed 6 February 1940)	Municipal Reform	Frank Griffiths Woollard	Conservative
Camberwell North	Charles Ammon	Labour	NO CHANGE	Labour	Richard Samuel Griffith	Labour
Camberwell North	Cecil Manning	Labour	NO CHANGE	Labour	Cecil Manning	Labour
Camberwell North West	Frederick George Burgess	Labour	NO CHANGE	Labour	Frederick George Burgess	Labour
Camberwell North West	Freda Corbet	Labour	NO CHANGE	Labour	Freda Corbet	Labour
Camberwell Peckham	Richard Sargood	Labour	NO CHANGE	Labour	Richard Sargood	Labour
Camberwell Peckham	Earl Beatty	Municipal Reform	NO CHANGE	Municipal Reform	James Walter Frederick Lucas	Labour
Chelsea	Basil Futvoye Marsden-Smedley	Municipal Reform	NO CHANGE	Municipal Reform	John Vaughan-Morgan	Conservative
Chelsea	Catherine Fulford	Municipal Reform	NO CHANGE	Municipal Reform	Catherine Fulford	Conservative
Deptford	Isaac Hayward	Labour	NO CHANGE	Labour	Isaac Hayward	Labour
Deptford	John Speakman (died)	Labour	Ernest Sherwood (appointed 17 November 1942)	Labour	Ernest Sherwood	Labour
Finsbury	William Henry Martin	Labour	NO CHANGE	Labour	Barbara Marian Dobb	Labour
Finsbury	George Edward Hayes	Labour	NO CHANGE	Labour	Chuni Lal Katial	Labour
Fulham East	Paul Williams	Labour	NO CHANGE	Labour	Joan Ash	Labour
Fulham East	Fred Powe	Labour	NO CHANGE	Labour	Fred Powe	Labour
Fulham West	Christopher Lancaster	Labour	NO CHANGE	Labour	Christopher Lancaster	Labour
Fulham West	Geoffrey Weston Aplin	Municipal Reform	NO CHANGE	Municipal Reform	Frank Banfield	Labour
Greenwich	Esther Rickards	Labour	NO CHANGE	Labour	Harold Gibbons (died 5 June 1948) Johanna Gollogly (elected at byelection 22 July 1948)	Labour
Greenwich	Bernard Sullivan	Labour	NO CHANGE	Labour	Bernard Sullivan	Labour
Hackney Central	Bernard Homa	Labour	NO CHANGE	Labour	Bernard Homa	Labour
Hackney Central	Mary O'Brien Harris (died 19 April 1938) Peggy Jay (elected at by-election 16 May 1938)	Labour	NO CHANGE	Labour	Peggy Jay	Labour
Hackney North	Henry Edwin Goodrich	Labour	NO CHANGE	Labour	Max Sorsby	Labour
Hackney North	Molly Bolton	Labour	NO CHANGE	Labour	Molly Bolton	Labour
Hackney South	Alfred Baker (died 2 April 1943)	Labour	Giles Charles Burton (appointed 1 June 1943)	Labour	Giles Charles Burton	Labour
Hackney South	Charles Latham	Labour	NO CHANGE	Labour	William Nichols	Labour
Hammersmith North	William Henry Church	Labour	NO CHANGE	Labour	James Bishop Bennie	Labour
Hammersmith North	Thomas Henry Jones	Labour	NO CHANGE	Labour	Thomas Henry Jones	Labour
Hammersmith South	Walter Clifford Northcott	Municipal Reform	NO CHANGE	Municipal Reform	Bill Fiske	Labour
Hammersmith South	Bertie Jonathan Samels	Municipal Reform	NO CHANGE	Municipal Reform	Vera Dart	Labour
Hampstead	Sydney Copeman (resigned 23 July 1945)	Municipal Reform	John Fremantle (appointed 31 July 1945)	Municipal Reform	John Fremantle	Conservative
Hampstead	William Reed Hornby Steer	Municipal Reform	NO CHANGE	Municipal Reform	William Reed Hornby Steer	Conservative
Holborn	Alfred Walter Scott	Municipal Reform	NO CHANGE	Municipal Reform	Alfred Walter Scott	Conservative
Holborn	Theodore Magnus Wechsler	Municipal Reform	NO CHANGE	Municipal Reform	Theodore Magnus Wechsler	Conservative
Islington East	Day Kimball (resigned 2 March 1940)	Municipal Reform	Leslie Walker (appointed 30 April 1940)	Municipal Reform	Irene Chaplin	Labour
Islington East	Ronald Storrs (resigned 28 May 1945)	Municipal Reform	Hugh Quennell (appointed 19 June 1945)	Municipal Reform	Edwin Bayliss	Labour
Islington North	Eva Elizabeth Bull	Labour	NO CHANGE	Labour	Eva Elizabeth Bull	Labour
Islington North	Arthur Norman Dove	Municipal Reform	NO CHANGE	Municipal Reform	Arthur Edward Middleton	Labour
Islington South	Eric Fletcher	Labour	Eric Fletcher	Labour	Eric Fletcher	Labour
Islington South	John Dugdale (resigned 17 June 1941)	Labour	George Leonard Parker (appointed 1 July 1941)	Labour	George Percival Wright	Labour
Islington West	Alfred George Prichard (died 8 December 1945: seat remained vacant)	Labour	NO CHANGE	Labour	Albert Evans	Labour
Islington West	George Bryant Naish	Labour	NO CHANGE	Labour	George Bryant Naish	Labour
Kensington North	Ivan Power (resigned 18 October 1940)	Labour	Donald Daines (appointed 19 November 1940)	Labour	Leonard Foster Browne	Labour
Kensington North	Helen Bentwich	Labour	NO CHANGE	Labour	Eva Marian Hubback	Labour
Kensington South	Robert Jenkins	Municipal Reform	NO CHANGE	Municipal Reform	Robert Jenkins	Conservative
Kensington South	Angela, Countess of Limerick	Municipal Reform	NO CHANGE	Municipal Reform	Elizabeth Evelyn Halton (Halton became known as Mrs. Pepler on her marriage in January 1947, and as Lady Pepler when her husband was knighted on 1 January 1948.)	Conservative
Lambeth Brixton	Gervas Pierrepont	Municipal Reform	NO CHANGE	Municipal Reform	Victor Mishcon	Labour
Lambeth Brixton	Barbara Lythgoe Hornby	Municipal Reform	NO CHANGE	Municipal Reform	Walter Guy Robert Boys	Labour
Lambeth Kennington	Charles Gibson	Labour	NO CHANGE	Labour	Charles Gibson	Labour
Lambeth Kennington	Amy Sayle	Labour	NO CHANGE	Labour	Howell John Powell	Labour
Lambeth North	Will Lockyer	Labour	NO CHANGE	Labour	Will Lockyer	Labour
Lambeth North	Ada Emily Gray	Labour	NO CHANGE	Labour	Patricia Strauss	Labour
Lambeth Norwood	Joan Vickers	Municipal Reform	NO CHANGE	Municipal Reform	Ronald Russell	Conservative
Lambeth Norwood	William Francis Marchant	Municipal Reform	NO CHANGE	Municipal Reform	Margery Thornton	Conservative
Lewisham East	Walter Richard Owen	Labour	NO CHANGE	Labour	Walter Richard Owen	Labour
Lewisham East	Earl of Listowel	Labour	NO CHANGE	Labour	Edmund Hambly	Labour
Lewisham West	Malcolm Campbell-Johnston (died 12 March 1938) Geoffrey Paul Hardy-Roberts (elected unopposed 28 April 1938)	Municipal Reform	NO CHANGE	Municipal Reform	George Rowland Durston Bradfield	Conservative
Lewisham West	Rupert Brabner (resigned 29 January 1945)	Municipal Reform	Henry Brooke (appointed 20 February 1945)	Municipal Reform	Henry A. Price	Conservative
Paddington North	Eric Hall	Municipal Reform	NO CHANGE	Municipal Reform	George de Swiet	Labour
Paddington North	Frank Stanley Henwood	Municipal Reform	NO CHANGE	Municipal Reform	Xenia Field	Labour
Paddington South	Harold Kenyon	Municipal Reform	NO CHANGE	Municipal Reform	Norris Kenyon	Conservative
Paddington South	Henry Gray Studholme (resigned 13 April 1945)	Municipal Reform	Ernest Hyatt (appointed 1 May 1945)	Municipal Reform	Frederick Lawrence	Conservative
Poplar, Bow and Bromley	Ethel Mary Lambert (disqualified 31 July 1945)	Labour	Edward Heslop Smith (appointed 31 July 1945)	Labour	Edward Heslop Smith (elected unopposed)	Labour
Poplar, Bow and Bromley	Edward Cruse (died 15 December 1938); Thomas John Goodway (elected unopposed 16 February 1939)	Labour	NO CHANGE	Labour	Lilian Maud Sadler (elected unopposed)	Labour
Poplar South	Frederick Thomas Baldock	Labour	NO CHANGE	Labour	Frederick Thomas Baldock	Labour
Poplar South	William Henry Guy	Labour	NO CHANGE	Labour	William Henry Guy	Labour
St Marylebone	Frederick William Dean	Municipal Reform	NO CHANGE	Municipal Reform	Alfred Edward Reneson Coucher	Conservative
St Marylebone	Ernest Sanger (died 26 December 1939)	Municipal Reform	Richard Stiles Allen (appointed 5 March 1940)	Municipal Reform	Eric Hall	Conservative
St Pancras North	George House	Labour	NO CHANGE	Labour	George House	Labour
St Pancras North	Harry Smith	Labour	NO CHANGE	Labour	Harry Smith	Labour
St Pancras South East	Frank Lawrence Combes	Labour	NO CHANGE	Labour	Frank Lawrence Combes; Died 26 September 1948 Iris Mary Caroline Bonham; Elected at byelection 18 November 1948	Labour
St Pancras South East	David C. Webster	Labour	NO CHANGE	Labour	David C. Webster	Labour
St Pancras South West	Monica Felton	Labour	NO CHANGE	Labour	Evelyn Denington	Labour
St Pancras South West	Maurice Orbach	Labour	NO CHANGE	Labour	Marks Ripka	Labour
Shoreditch	Santo Jeger	Labour	NO CHANGE	Labour	Dorothy Thurtle	Labour
Shoreditch	Henrietta Girling	Labour	NO CHANGE	Labour	Henrietta Girling	Labour
Southwark Central	Harry Day (died 16 September 1939)	Labour	Ernest George Saunders (appointed 5 March 1940)	Labour	Albert Gates	Labour
Southwark Central	David Arlott	Labour	NO CHANGE	Labour	John J. Keen	Labour
Southwark North	Charles Brook (resigned 3 March 1942)	Labour	Thomas George Gibbings (appointed 21 April 1942)	Labour	Thomas George Gibbings	Labour
Southwark North	James Hyndman MacDonnell	Labour	NO CHANGE	Labour	James Hyndman MacDonnell	Labour
Southwark South East	George Russell Strauss	Labour	NO CHANGE	Labour	Albert Bernard Kennedy	Labour
Southwark South East	Lewis Silkin	Labour	NO CHANGE	Labour	Mary Ormerod	Labour
Stepney, Limehouse	Richard Coppock	Labour	NO CHANGE	Labour	Richard Coppock	Labour
Stepney, Limehouse	Monica Whately	Labour	NO CHANGE	Labour	Louise Reeve	Labour
Stepney, Mile End	Somerville Hastings	Labour	NO CHANGE	Labour	Ted Bramley	Communist
Stepney, Mile End	Daniel Frankel	Labour	NO CHANGE	Labour	Jack Gaster	Communist
Stepney, Whitechapel and St George's	Morry Davis (disqualified 11 January 1945)	Labour	Richard Clements (appointed 17 April 1945)	Labour	Richard Clements	Labour
Stepney, Whitechapel and St George's	John Richard Anthony Oldfield	Labour	NO CHANGE	Labour	Jack Oldfield	Labour
Stoke Newington	Mark Auliff	Labour	NO CHANGE	Labour	Mark Auliff	Labour
Stoke Newington	Catherine Jefferies	Labour	NO CHANGE	Labour	Reginald Pestell	Labour
Wandsworth, Balham and Tooting	Stephen Benson (resigned 18 February 1942)	Municipal Reform	Harold William Hayden (appointed 10 March 1942)	Municipal Reform	Eleanor Goodrich	Labour
Wandsworth, Balham and Tooting	George Doland (resigned 4 April 1940)	Municipal Reform	William Charles Bonney (appointed 30 April 1940)	Municipal Reform	Albert Samuels	Labour
Wandsworth, Central	George Welsh Currie (resigned 27 December 1939)	Labour	John William Bowen (appointed 5 March 1940)	Labour	John William Bowen	Labour
Wandsworth, Central	Eleanor Joan Clara Nathan (Lady Nathan from 1940)	Labour	NO CHANGE	Labour	Lady Nathan	Labour
Wandsworth, Clapham	Bertram Mills (died 16 April 1938)	Municipal Reform	NO CHANGE	Labour	Leslie Banks	Labour
Wandsworth, Clapham	John Rose Battley (elected at by-election 19 May 1938)	Labour	NO CHANGE	Labour	Leslie Banks	Labour
Wandsworth, Clapham	John Leigh	Municipal Reform	NO CHANGE	Municipal Reform	Alfred Bransom	Labour
Wandsworth, Putney	Robert Taylor	Municipal Reform	Viscount Cranley (appointed 5 March 1940); Succeeded to the peerage as Earl of Onslow 9 June 1945	Municipal Reform	Earl of Onslow	Municipal Reform
Wandsworth, Putney	Arthur Bellamy (resigned 16 February 1940)	Municipal Reform	Herbert Ryan (appointed 5 March 1940)	Municipal Reform	Herbert Ryan	Municipal Reform
Wandsworth, Streatham	J. Elliott Mark	Municipal Reform	NO CHANGE	Municipal Reform	Frank Henry Campbell (Died 17 November 1948: seat remained vacant)	Conservative
Wandsworth, Streatham	Frederic Bertram Galer (Knighted as Sir Bertram Galer 1939)	Municipal Reform	NO CHANGE	Municipal Reform	Bertram Galer	Conservative
Westminster, Abbey	Samuel Gluckstein	Municipal Reform	NO CHANGE	Municipal Reform	Samuel Gluckstein	Conservative
Westminster, Abbey	Frank Rye	Municipal Reform	NO CHANGE	Municipal Reform	Frank Rye	Conservative
Westminster, St George's	Florence Barrie Lambert (Dame from 1938)	Municipal Reform	NO CHANGE	Municipal Reform	Henry Brooke	Conservative
Westminster, St George's	Edmund Walter Hanbury Wood	Municipal Reform	NO CHANGE	Municipal Reform	Anthony Kershaw	Conservative
Woolwich, East	Reginald H. Pott	Labour	NO CHANGE	Labour	Reginald H. Pott (elected unopposed)	Labour
Woolwich, East	Henry Berry	Labour	NO CHANGE	Labour	Henry Berry (elected unopposed)	Labour
Woolwich, West	Francis William Beech	Municipal Reform	NO CHANGE	Municipal Reform	Edwin Thomas Lamerton	Labour
Woolwich, West	James Harry Millar (resigned 25 July 1945)	Municipal Reform	Stanley Charles Camps Harris (appointed 31 July 1945)	Municipal Reform	Ethel Maud Newman	Labour

‡ Previously councillor for a different division. ¶ Previously an alderman.

== County aldermen 1937–1949 ==
Aldermen elected for 1934-1940 had their term of office extended until 1946; those elected for 1937-1943 had their term of office extended to 1949.

Term	Alderman	Party
1934 - 1946	George Hume	Municipal Reform
1934 - 1946; 1946 - 1950	Emil Davies (died 18 July 1950)	Labour
1934 - 1946	Harold Webbe (appointed a councillor February 1940)	Municipal Reform
1934 - 1946	William Bennett (died 4 November 1937)	Labour
1934 - 1946	Jack Percy Blake	Labour
1934 - 1946	George Pearce Blizard	Labour
1934 - 1946	Henry Charleton (resigned 17 December 1935)	Labour
1934 - 1946	Barbara Drake	Labour
1934 - 1946	William Kelly (resigned 27 July 1939)	Labour
1934 - 1946; 1946 - 1952	Charles Robertson	Labour
1935 - 1942; 1946 - 1952	Ruth Dalton (in place of Charleton, 11 February 1935) (resigned 10 October 1945)	Labour
1937 - 1949	Eric Ball (resigned 25 January 1946)	Municipal Reform
1937 - 1949	John Hare	Municipal Reform
1937 - 1949	Edward Martin (died 10 February 1946)	Municipal Reform
1937 - 1949	John Martin Oakey	Municipal Reform
1937 - 1949	Norah Runge	Municipal Reform
1937 - 1949	Edgar John Sainsbury (died 29 January 1949)	Municipal Reform
1937 - 1949	Herbert Morrison (resigned 21 November 1945)	Labour
1937 - 1949	Leah L'Estrange Malone	Labour
1937 - 1949	John Cliff	Labour
1937 - 1949	Mary Agnes Hamilton (resigned 8 March 1939)	Labour
1937 - 1946	John Wilmot (in place of William Bennett, deceased)	Labour
1939 - 1949	Ethel Maud Newman (in place of Hamilton, 14 March 1939) (elected as councillor 13 March 1946)	Labour
1939 - 1941	John Thomas Scoulding (in place of Kelly, 1 August 1939) (resigned 29 April 1941)	Labour
1940 - 1946	Herbert Williams (in place of Webbe, 5 March 1940) (resigned 20 December 1944)	Municipal Reform
1941 - 1946	Eddie Binks (in place of Scoulding) (29 July 1941)	Labour
1942 - 1946	Arthur Edward Middleton (in place of Dalton, 19 May 1942)	Labour
1945 - 1946; 1946 - 1949	Geoffrey Hutchinson (in place of Williams, 6 February 1945) (in place of Martin 5 March 1946)	Municipal Reform
1945 - 1946; 1946 - 1952	Donald Daines (in place of Wilmot, 23 October 1945)	Labour
1945 - 1947	Lord Latham (in place of Wilmot, 4 December 1945) (resigned 19 November 1947)	Labour
1946 - 1949	Florence Barrie Lambert (in place of Ball, 5 February 1946)	Municipal Reform
1946 - 1949	Amy Sayle (in place of Newman, 19 March 1946)	Labour
1946 - 1952	Florence Cayford	Labour
1946 - 1952	Ewart Culpin (died 1 December 1946)	Labour
1946 - 1952	Walter Henry Green	Labour
1946 - 1952	Somerville Hastings	Labour
1946 - 1952	Reginald Stamp	Labour
1946 - 1952	Tom Wheeler	Labour
1946 - 1952	Harold Shearman (in place of Culpin, 17 December 1946)	Labour
1947 - 1949	Douglas Houghton (in place of Latham, 12 December 1947)	Labour
1949	Jack Cooper (in place of Sainsbury, 22 February 1949)	Labour
