= Southwark (disambiguation) =

Southwark is a district of London, England.

Southwark may also refer to:

- Southwark, Philadelphia, U.S.
- Southwark, South Australia, a new suburb of Adelaide created in 2025
- Southwark, the former name of part of the Adelaide suburb Thebarton, South Australia; and namesake of the more recent suburb
  - Southwark beer, from the Southwark Brewery

== See also ==
- Borough of Southwark (disambiguation)
- Southwark constituency (disambiguation)
- Anglican Diocese of Southwark, London
  - Anglican Bishop of Southwark
- Roman Catholic Archdiocese of Southwark, London
  - Archbishop of Southwark
