= Southwark constituency =

Southwark constituency may refer to various constituencies associated with the area of Southwark in London:

- Bermondsey and Old Southwark (UK Parliament constituency) (from 2010)
- Lambeth and Southwark (London Assembly constituency) (from 2010)
- North Southwark and Bermondsey (UK Parliament constituency) (1997–2010)
- Southwark (London County Council constituency) (1949–1965)
- Southwark (UK Parliament constituency) (1295–1885; 1950–1974)
- Southwark and Bermondsey (UK Parliament constituency) (1983–1997)
- Southwark Central (London County Council constituency) (1919–1949)
- Southwark Central (UK Parliament constituency) (1918–1950)
- Southwark North (London County Council constituency) (1919–1949)
- Southwark North (UK Parliament constituency) (1918–1950)
- Southwark South East (London County Council constituency) (1919–1949)
- Southwark South East (UK Parliament constituency) (1918–1950)
- Southwark West (UK Parliament constituency) (1885–1918)
