= Haggerston (London County Council constituency) =

London County Council constituency

- Former constituency for the London County Council

Former constituency
- Created: 1889
- Abolished: 1919
- Member(s): 2
- Replaced by: Shoreditch

Haggerston was a constituency used for elections to the London County Council between 1889 and 1919. The seat shared boundaries with the UK Parliament constituency of the same name. The seat became part of Shoreditch.

== Councillors ==
Year	Name	Party	Name	Party
1889	Joseph Bottomley Firth	Progressive	Robert Collier	Progressive
1889	William James Orsman	Progressive	Robert Collier	Progressive
1895	Edmund Turton	Progressive	Robert Collier	Progressive
1897	George Shaw Lefevre	Progressive	Robert Collier	Progressive
1901	James Stuart	Progressive	Robert Collier	Progressive
1907	Rupert Guinness	Municipal Reform	Gilbert Johnstone	Municipal Reform
1910	Arthur Acland Allen	Progressive	Stephen Gee	Progressive
1913	David Blackley	Progressive	Henry Ward	Progressive

== Election results ==
1889 London County Council election: Haggerston
Party	Candidate	Votes	%	±%
Progressive	Joseph Bottomley Firth	1,791		
Progressive	Robert Collier	1,671		
Moderate	Henry William Mason	1,035		
Moderate	Frederick Moore Wenborn	978		
Independent	Henry Greenwood	507		
Moderate	John Richard Sackett	60		
Progressive win (new seat)				
Progressive win (new seat)				

1889 Haggerston by-election
Party	Candidate	Votes	%	±%
Progressive	William James Orsman	1,953		
Moderate	Edward Thomas Holloway	626		
Progressive hold		Swing		

1892 London County Council election: Haggerston
Party	Candidate	Votes	%	±%
Progressive	William James Orsman	2,233		
Progressive	Robert Collier	2,192		
Moderate	Joseph Davies	543		
Moderate	James Ritchie Macoun	532		
Progressive hold		Swing		
Progressive hold		Swing		

1895 London County Council election: Haggerston
Party	Candidate	Votes	%	±%
Progressive	Robert Collier	1,683		
Progressive	Edmund Turton	1,598		
Moderate	A. Morris	1,130		
Moderate	A. Sieveking	1,102		
Progressive hold		Swing		
Progressive hold		Swing		

1898 London County Council election: Haggerston
Party	Candidate	Votes	%	±%
Progressive	Robert Collier	2,067		
Progressive	George Shaw Lefevre	2,060		
Moderate	Stanley Boulter	862		
Moderate	C. F. Shallard	839		
Progressive hold		Swing		
Progressive hold		Swing		

1901 London County Council election: Haggerston
Party	Candidate	Votes	%	±%
Progressive	James Stuart	2,300	35.3	0.0
Progressive	Robert Collier	2,251	34.5	−1.0
Conservative	William Bridgeman	1,001	15.3	+0.5
Conservative	Charles Walker	968	14.8	+0.4
Progressive hold		Swing		
Progressive hold		Swing	-0.5	

1904 London County Council election: Haggerston
Party	Candidate	Votes	%	±%
Progressive	Robert Collier	2,479		
Progressive	James Stuart	3,026		
Conservative	Stokoe	1,093		
Conservative	J. H. S. Lloyd	1,030		
Majority				
Progressive hold		Swing		
Progressive hold		Swing		

1907 London County Council election: Haggerston
Party	Candidate	Votes	%	±%
Municipal Reform	Rupert Guinness	3,307		
Municipal Reform	Gilbert Johnstone	3,131		
Progressive	Robert Collier	3,085		
Progressive	Stephen Gee	3,026		
Majority				
Municipal Reform gain from Progressive		Swing		
Municipal Reform gain from Progressive		Swing		

1910 London County Council election: Haggerston
Party	Candidate	Votes	%	±%
Progressive	Stephen Gee	2,845		
Progressive	Arthur Acland Allen	2,839		
Municipal Reform	Gilbert Johnstone	2,479		
Municipal Reform	G. V. Wellesley	2,358		
Majority				
Progressive gain from Municipal Reform		Swing		
Progressive gain from Municipal Reform		Swing		

1913 London County Council election: Haggerston
Party	Candidate	Votes	%	±%
Progressive	Henry Ward	2,178		
Progressive	David Blackley	2,167		
Municipal Reform	John Jarvis	1,975		
Municipal Reform	William Brass	1,970		
Majority				
Progressive hold		Swing		
Progressive hold		Swing		
