= Shoreditch and Finsbury (London County Council constituency) =

London County Council constituency

- Former constituency for the London County Council

Former constituency
- Created: 1949
- Abolished: 1965
- Member(s): 3
- Created from: Finsbury and Shoreditch

Shoreditch and Finsbury was a constituency used for elections to the London County Council between 1949 and the council's abolition, in 1965. The seat shared boundaries with the UK Parliament constituency of the same name.

== Councillors ==
Year	Name	Party	Name	Party	Name	Party
1949	William Lewis Prowse	Labour	Charles Simmons	Labour	Robert Jefferson Tallantire	Labour
1952	Florence Cayford	Labour	Donald Daines	Labour	Arthur Wicks	Labour
1958	Florence Cayford	Labour	Olive Deer	Labour	Arthur Wicks	Labour

== Election results ==
1949 London County Council election: Shoreditch and Finsbury
Party	Candidate	Votes	%	±%
Labour	William Lewis Prowse	9,474		
Labour	Robert Jefferson Tallantire	9,443		
Labour	Charles Simmons	9,348		
Conservative	W. W. Lovejoy	6,170		
Conservative	A. G. Webb	6,071		
Conservative	M. Westerman	5,933		

1952 London County Council election: Shoreditch and Finsbury
Party	Candidate	Votes	%	±%
Labour	Donald Daines	11,739		
Labour	Arthur Wicks	11,719		
Labour	Florence Cayford	11,703		
Conservative	M. Westerman	4,688		
Conservative	D. W. Bromfield	4,388		
Conservative	D. M. Ambrose	4,093		
Labour hold		Swing		

1955 London County Council election: Shoreditch and Finsbury
Party	Candidate	Votes	%	±%
Labour	Florence Cayford	8,125		
Labour	Arthur Wicks	7,988		
Labour	Donald Daines	7,934		
Conservative	R. Blackler	1,868		
Conservative	D. M. Ambrose	1,795		
Conservative	B. Wheare	1,760		
Union Movement	W. B. Beard	953		
Union Movement	M. Jones	850		
Union Movement	Jeffrey Hamm	773		
Labour hold		Swing		

1958 London County Council election: Shoreditch and Finsbury
Party	Candidate	Votes	%	±%
Labour	Arthur Wicks	9,504		
Labour	Olive Deer	9,319		
Labour	Florence Cayford	9,142		
Conservative	D. R. Collins	2,691		
Conservative	D. M. Ambrose	1,742		
Conservative	Malcolm Bowden Agnew	1,720		
Labour hold		Swing		

1961 London County Council election: Shoreditch and Finsbury
Party	Candidate	Votes	%	±%
Labour	Arthur Wicks	9,386		
Labour	Olive Deer	9,182		
Labour	Florence Cayford	9,180		
Conservative	Thomas Henry Martin Whipham	2,887		
Conservative	J. B. W. Holderness	2,701		
Conservative	J. Silver	2,571		
Labour hold		Swing		
