= Islington North (London County Council constituency) =

London County Council constituency

- Former constituency for the London County Council

Former constituency
- Created: 1889
- Abolished: 1965
- Member(s): 2 (to 1949); 3 (from 1949)

Islington North was a constituency used for elections to the London County Council between 1889 and the council's abolition, in 1965. The seat shared boundaries with the UK Parliament constituency of the same name.

== Councillors ==
Year	Name	Party	Name	Party	Name	Party
1889	William Ebenezer Grigsby	Progressive	William Coulson Parkinson	Progressive	Two seats until 1949	
1893	Thomas Bateman Napier	Progressive	William Coulson Parkinson	Progressive	Two seats until 1949	
1907	Frederick Lionel Dove	Municipal Reform	Charles Kenneth Murchison	Municipal Reform	Two seats until 1949	
1910	Frederick Lionel Dove	Municipal Reform	John Cathles Hill	Municipal Reform	Two seats until 1949	
1912	Frederick Lionel Dove	Municipal Reform	Richard Joshua Cooper	Municipal Reform	Two seats until 1949	
1919	Frederick Lionel Dove	Municipal Reform	Robert McKenna	Labour	Two seats until 1949	
1922	Frederick Lionel Dove	Municipal Reform	Rosamund Smith	Municipal Reform	Two seats until 1949	
1932	Sidney Charles Harper	Municipal Reform	Rosamund Smith	Municipal Reform	Two seats until 1949	
1934	Sidney Charles Harper	Municipal Reform	Athro Charles Knight	Municipal Reform	Two seats until 1949	
1937	Eva Bull	Labour	Arthur Norman Dove	Municipal Reform	Two seats until 1949	
1946	Eva Bull	Labour	Arthur Edward Middleton	Labour	Two seats until 1949	
1949	Eva Bull	Labour	Arthur Edward Middleton	Labour	Charles William Pope	Labour
1952	Eva Bull	Labour	Hazel Rose	Labour	Charles William Pope	Labour

== Election results ==
1889 London County Council election: Islington North
Party	Candidate	Votes	%	±%
Progressive	William Coulson Parkinson	2,159		
Progressive	William Ebenezer Grigsby	2,080		
Moderate	Arthur Robert Chamberlayne	1,787		
Moderate	Herbert Stephen	1,464		
Progressive win (new seat)				
Progressive win (new seat)				

1892 London County Council election: Islington North
Party	Candidate	Votes	%	±%
Progressive	William Ebenezer Grigsby	2,976		
Progressive	William Coulson Parkinson	2,883		
Moderate	Arthur Robert Chamberlayne	2,604		
Moderate	J. W. Dixon	2,588		
Progressive hold		Swing		
Progressive hold		Swing		

1895 London County Council election: Islington North
Party	Candidate	Votes	%	±%
Progressive	Thomas Bateman Napier	3,154		
Progressive	William Coulson Parkinson	3,123		
Moderate	Arthur Robert Chamberlayne	2,992		
Moderate	Benson Clough	2,939		
Progressive hold		Swing		
Progressive hold		Swing		

1898 London County Council election: Islington North
Party	Candidate	Votes	%	±%
Progressive	Thomas Bateman Napier	3,525		
Progressive	William Coulson Parkinson	3,228		
Conservative	George Benson Clough	2,880		
Conservative	A. Thynne	2,801		
Progressive hold		Swing		
Progressive hold		Swing		

1901 London County Council election: Islington North
Party	Candidate	Votes	%	±%
Progressive	Thomas Bateman Napier	4,097	32.6	+4.3
Progressive	William Coulson Parkinson	4,075	32.4	+6.4
Conservative	George Benson Clough	2,206	17.5	−5.7
Conservative	Sydney Gedge	2,197	17.5	−5.0
Progressive hold		Swing		
Progressive hold		Swing	+5.4	

1904 London County Council election: Islington North
Party	Candidate	Votes	%	±%
Progressive	Thomas Bateman Napier	3,876		
Progressive	William Coulson Parkinson	3,858		
Conservative	E. Tomkins	2,811		
Conservative	James Wilson Sharp	2,771		
Majority				
Progressive hold		Swing		

1907 London County Council election: Islington North
Party	Candidate	Votes	%	±%
Municipal Reform	Frederick Lionel Dove	4,924		
Municipal Reform	Charles Kenneth Murchison	4,797		
Progressive	H. J. Glanville	4,200		
Progressive	H. G. Chancellor	4,192		
Independent	J. C. Clutterbuck	364		
Majority				
Municipal Reform gain from Progressive		Swing		
Municipal Reform gain from Progressive		Swing		

1910 London County Council election: Islington North
Party	Candidate	Votes	%	±%
Municipal Reform	John Cathles Hill	4,613	27.1	
Municipal Reform	Frederick Lionel Dove	4,591	27.0	
Progressive	William Edward Mullins	3,918	23.0	
Progressive	Gordon Hall Caine	3,884	22.8	
Majority				
Municipal Reform hold		Swing		

1913 London County Council election: Islington North
Party	Candidate	Votes	%	±%
Municipal Reform	Frederick Lionel Dove	4,796	25.6	−1.4
Municipal Reform	Richard Joshua Cooper	4,792	25.6	−1.5
Progressive	J. H. Torrance	4,574	24.4	+1.4
Progressive	Henry Scipio Reitlinger	4,549	24.3	+1.5
Majority		228	1.2	
Municipal Reform hold		Swing	-1.5	

1919 London County Council election: Islington North
Party	Candidate	Votes	%	±%
Labour	Robert McKenna	1,791	49.5	
Municipal Reform	Frederick Lionel Dove	915	25.3	
Municipal Reform	Alfred Sim	910	25.2	
Majority		876	24.2	
Municipal Reform hold		Swing	n/a	
Labour gain from Municipal Reform		Swing		

1922 London County Council election: Islington North
Party	Candidate	Votes	%	±%
Municipal Reform	Frederick Lionel Dove	8,644	26.9	+1.6
Municipal Reform	Rosamund Smith	7,970	24.8	−0.4
Labour	Robert McKenna	4,833	15.1	−34.4
Labour	Hilda Miall Smith	4,766	14.8	n/a
Progressive	David Waterlow	3,207	10.0	n/a
Progressive	W. Allen	2,692	8.4	n/a
Majority		3,137	9.7	33.9
Municipal Reform gain from Labour		Swing		
Municipal Reform hold		Swing	n/a	

1925 London County Council election: Islington North
Party	Candidate	Votes	%	±%
Municipal Reform	Frederick Lionel Dove	6,727		
Municipal Reform	Rosamund Smith	6,565		
Labour	Hilda Miall Smith	5,201		
Labour	W. H. King	4,939		
Majority				
Municipal Reform hold		Swing		
Municipal Reform hold		Swing		

1928 London County Council election: Islington North
Party	Candidate	Votes	%	±%
Municipal Reform	Frederick Lionel Dove	6,366		
Municipal Reform	Rosamund Smith	6,253		
Labour	Herbert Lygoe	4,407		
Labour	Freda Corbet	4,365		
Independent Labour	J. F. Denning	754		
Independent Labour	J. R. Scott	749		
Majority				
Municipal Reform hold		Swing		
Municipal Reform hold		Swing		

1931 London County Council election: Islington North
Party	Candidate	Votes	%	±%
Municipal Reform	Frederick Lionel Dove	6,674		
Municipal Reform	Rosamund Smith	6,504		
Labour	C. E. Ratcliffe	3,946		
Labour	Freda Corbet	3,868		
Communist	J. R. Scott	249		
Communist	E. Cooper	229		
Majority				
Municipal Reform hold		Swing		
Municipal Reform hold		Swing		

Islington North by-election, 1932
Party	Candidate	Votes	%	±%
Municipal Reform	Sidney Charles Harper	2,610		
Labour	Freda Corbet	2,158		
Majority		452		
Municipal Reform hold		Swing		

1934 London County Council election: Islington North
Party	Candidate	Votes	%	±%
Municipal Reform	Sidney Charles Harper	6,426		
Municipal Reform	Athro Charles Knight	6,411		
Labour	G. Alexander	5,688		
Labour	B. Simmonds	5,644		
Majority				
Municipal Reform hold		Swing		
Municipal Reform hold		Swing		

1937 London County Council election: Islington North
Party	Candidate	Votes	%	±%
Labour	Eva Bull	8,721		
Municipal Reform	Arthur Norman Dove	8,687		
Municipal Reform	Athro Charles Knight	8,478		
Labour	Arthur Edward Middleton	8,382		
Liberal	W. Simpson	610		
Liberal	W. W. Kerry	603		
Majority				
Labour gain from Municipal Reform		Swing		
Municipal Reform hold		Swing		

1946 London County Council election: Islington North
Party	Candidate	Votes	%	±%
Labour	Eva Bull	7,269		
Labour	Arthur Edward Middleton	7,114		
Conservative	Arthur Norman Dove	4,085		
Conservative	Cecilia Monica Turnour	3,878		
Independent	Athro Charles Knight	630		
Majority				
Labour gain from Municipal Reform		Swing		
Labour hold		Swing		

1949 London County Council election: Islington North
Party	Candidate	Votes	%	±%
Labour	Eva Bull	10,997		
Labour	Arthur Edward Middleton	10,604		
Labour	Charles William Pope	10,345		
Conservative	H. P. Brooks	10,129		
Conservative	R. M. Heath	9,659		
Conservative	Geoffrey Finsberg	9,612		
Labour win (new seat)				
Labour hold		Swing		
Labour hold		Swing		

1952 London County Council election: Islington North
Party	Candidate	Votes	%	±%
Labour	Eva Bull	14,695		
Labour	Hazel Rose	14,135		
Labour	Charles William Pope	14,065		
Conservative	A. N. Dove	9,168		
Conservative	J. R. Goodman	9,070		
Conservative	R. M. Heath	8,910		
Labour hold		Swing		
Labour hold		Swing		
Labour hold		Swing		

1955 London County Council election: Islington North
Party	Candidate	Votes	%	±%
Labour	Eva Bull	8,401		
Labour	Charles William Pope	8,147		
Labour	Hazel Rose	8,144		
Conservative	Grace Walsh	5,778		
Conservative	G. S. Landa	5,743		
Conservative	C. C. Baillieu	5,717		
Labour hold		Swing		
Labour hold		Swing		
Labour hold		Swing		

1958 London County Council election: Islington North
Party	Candidate	Votes	%	±%
Labour	Eva Bull	9,310		
Labour	Charles William Pope	8,941		
Labour	Hazel Rose	8,865		
Conservative	E. T. Bowman	3,931		
Conservative	P. M. Brudenell	3,820		
Conservative	V. Lyon	3,694		
Ind. Labour Party	Wilfred Wigham	436		
Labour hold		Swing		
Labour hold		Swing		
Labour hold		Swing		

1961 London County Council election: Islington North
Party	Candidate	Votes	%	±%
Labour	Eva Bull	8,085		
Labour	Hazel Rose	7,769		
Labour	Charles William Pope	7,754		
Conservative	R. J. L. Bramble	5,531		
Conservative	E. C. Brundenell	5,455		
Conservative	T. E. T. Weston	5,412		
Labour hold		Swing		
Labour hold		Swing		
Labour hold		Swing		
