= Peckham (London County Council constituency) =

London County Council constituency

- Former constituency for the London County Council

Former constituency
- Created: 1889
- Abolished: 1965
- Member(s): 2 (to 1949); 3 (from 1949)

Peckham was a constituency used for elections to the London County Council between 1889 and the council's abolition, in 1965. The seat shared boundaries with the UK Parliament constituency of the same name.

== Councillors ==
Year	Name	Party	Name	Party	Name	Party
1889	Edwin Jones	Progressive	Robert Lyon	Progressive	Two seats until 1949	
1898	Charles Goddard Clarke	Progressive	Frederick Verney	Progressive	Two seats until 1949	
1907	William Leonard Dowton	Municipal Reform	Thomas Gautrey	Progressive	Two seats until 1949	
1910	George Gordon	Progressive	Thomas Gautrey	Progressive	Two seats until 1949	
1925	J. P. Blake	Labour	Ruth Dalton	Labour	Two seats until 1949	
1931	Arthur Bateman	Municipal Reform	William James Jennings	Municipal Reform	Two seats until 1949	
1934	Francis Bowie	Labour	Richard Sargood	Labour	Two seats until 1949	
1937	David Beatty	Municipal Reform	Richard Sargood	Labour	Two seats until 1949	
1946	James Walter Frederick Lucas	Labour	Richard Sargood	Labour	Two seats until 1949	
1949	Freda Corbet	Labour	Richard Sargood	Labour	Cecil Manning	Labour
1950	Freda Corbet	Labour	Richard Sargood	Labour	Arthur Skeffington	Labour
1958	Freda Corbet	Labour	Richard Sargood	Labour	Walter Allen	Labour

== Election results ==
1889 London County Council election: Peckham
Party	Candidate	Votes	%	±%
Progressive	Edwin Jones	2,608		
Progressive	Robert Lyon	2,194		
Moderate	John Howard	1,639		
Moderate	John Borland	1,578		
Liberal Unionist	William Leonard Dowton	973		
Progressive win (new seat)				
Progressive win (new seat)				

1892 London County Council election: Peckham
Party	Candidate	Votes	%	±%
Progressive	Edwin Jones	3,109		
Progressive	Robert Lyon	3,103		
Moderate	Patrick Herbert White	2,116		
Progressive hold		Swing		
Progressive hold		Swing		

1895 London County Council election: Peckham
Party	Candidate	Votes	%	±%
Progressive	Edwin Jones	3,091		
Progressive	Robert Lyon	3,059		
Moderate	Patrick Herbert White	2,447		
Moderate	G. S. Baker	2,417		
Progressive hold		Swing		
Progressive hold		Swing		

1898 London County Council election: Peckham
Party	Candidate	Votes	%	±%
Progressive	Charles Goddard Clarke	3,201		
Progressive	Frederick Verney	2,849		
Moderate	William Scott-Scott	2,664		
Moderate	William Leonard Dowton	2,356		
Ind. Labour Party	J. E. Dobson	268		
Progressive hold		Swing		
Progressive hold		Swing		

1901 London County Council election: Peckham
Party	Candidate	Votes	%	±%
Progressive	Frederick Verney	3,553	31.6	+5.9
Progressive	Charles Clarke	3,546	31.6	+2.7
Conservative	William Scott-Scott	2,138	19.0	−5.2
Conservative	John David Rees	2,000	17.8	−3.4
Progressive hold		Swing		
Progressive hold		Swing	n/a	

1904 London County Council election: Peckham
Party	Candidate	Votes	%	±%
Progressive	Charles Goddard Clarke	3,935		
Progressive	Frederick Verney	3,871		
Conservative	J. Somerville	1,759		
Conservative	F. Fleming	1,666		
Majority				
Progressive hold		Swing		

1907 London County Council election: Peckham
Party	Candidate	Votes	%	±%
Progressive	Thomas Gautrey	4,659		
Municipal Reform	William Leonard Dowton	4,426		
Municipal Reform	D. C. Preston	4,379		
Progressive	R. Steven	4,262		
Labour	William Kelly	499		
Majority		164		
Municipal Reform gain from Progressive		Swing		
Progressive hold		Swing		

1910 London County Council election: Peckham
Party	Candidate	Votes	%	±%
Progressive	Thomas Gautrey	4,381	28.0	
Progressive	George Gordon	4,097	26.2	
Municipal Reform	William Leonard Dowton	3,653	23.3	
Municipal Reform	P. Conway	3,508	22.4	
Majority		444	2.9	
Progressive hold		Swing		
Progressive gain from Municipal Reform		Swing		

1913 London County Council election: Peckham
Party	Candidate	Votes	%	±%
Progressive	Thomas Gautrey	5,306	25.6	−2.4
Progressive	George Gordon	5,206	25.1	−1.1
Municipal Reform	William Leonard Dowton	5,127	24.7	+1.4
Municipal Reform	T. Richards	5,092	24.5	+2.1
Majority		79	0.4	−2.5
Progressive hold		Swing	-1.2	

1919 London County Council election: Peckham
Party	Candidate	Votes	%	±%
Progressive	Thomas Gautrey	Unopposed	n/a	n/a
Progressive	George Gordon	Unopposed	n/a	n/a
Progressive hold		Swing	n/a	
Progressive hold		Swing	n/a	

1922 London County Council election: Peckham
Party	Candidate	Votes	%	±%
Progressive	Thomas Gautrey	6,693		n/a
Progressive	Earl of Haddo	6,543		n/a
Labour	Arthur Creech-Jones	3,890		n/a
Labour	P. Sabine	3,728		n/a
Majority				n/a
Progressive hold		Swing	n/a	
Progressive hold		Swing	n/a	

1925 London County Council election: Peckham
Party	Candidate	Votes	%	±%
Labour	Ruth Dalton	6,398		
Labour	J. P. Blake	5,695		
Municipal Reform	G. J. Molony	2,988		n/a
Progressive	Thomas Gautrey	2,833		
Municipal Reform	D. C. Stephenson	2,583		n/a
Independent	Collingwood Hughes	2,346		n/a
Majority				n/a
Labour gain from Progressive		Swing		
Labour gain from Progressive		Swing		

1928 London County Council election: Peckham
Party	Candidate	Votes	%	±%
Labour	Ruth Dalton	7,705		
Labour	J. P. Blake	7,380		
Municipal Reform	John Martin Oakey	4,835		
Municipal Reform	William Reed Hornby Steer	4,833		
Liberal	A. Williams	1,810		
Liberal	G. H. Stepney	1,791		
Independent Labour	G. R. Carter	182		n/a
Majority				n/a
Labour hold		Swing		
Labour hold		Swing		

1931 London County Council election: Peckham
Party	Candidate	Votes	%	±%
Municipal Reform	Arthur Bateman	5,525		
Municipal Reform	William James Jennings	5,399		
Labour	J. P. Blake	4,502		
Labour	James Kaylor	4,329		
Majority				
Municipal Reform gain from Labour		Swing		
Municipal Reform gain from Labour		Swing		

1934 London County Council election: Peckham
Party	Candidate	Votes	%	±%
Labour	Richard Sargood	6,351		
Labour	Francis Bowie	6,279		
Municipal Reform	F. A. Lockwood	4,838		
Municipal Reform	W. H. Graham	4,738		
Liberal	F. Bridges	791		
Liberal	C. H. Rhodes	771		
Majority				
Labour gain from Municipal Reform		Swing		
Labour gain from Municipal Reform		Swing		

1937 London County Council election: Peckham
Party	Candidate	Votes	%	±%
Labour	Richard Sargood	8,024		
Municipal Reform	David Beatty	7,928		
Labour	Francis Bowie	7,725		
Municipal Reform	F. A. L. Lockwood	7,640		
Majority				
Municipal Reform gain from Labour		Swing		
Labour hold		Swing		

1946 London County Council election: Peckham
Party	Candidate	Votes	%	±%
Labour	Richard Sargood	4,453		
Labour	James Walter Frederick Lucas	4,429		
Conservative	R. J. O'Connel	2,411		
Conservative	A. F. Robinson	2,316		
British People's Party	G. Cook	236		
British People's Party	R. Malhotra	191		
Majority				
Labour gain from Conservative		Swing		
Labour hold		Swing		

1949 London County Council election: Peckham
Party	Candidate	Votes	%	±%
Labour	Freda Corbet	14,150		
Labour	Cecil Manning	13,995		
Labour	Richard Sargood	13,453		
Conservative	G. W. Bentley	7,081		
Conservative	W. Harrison	7,021		
Conservative	A. G. Hopkins	6,839		
Labour win (new seat)				
Labour hold		Swing		
Labour hold		Swing		

1952 London County Council election: Peckham
Party	Candidate	Votes	%	±%
Labour	Freda Corbet	18,545		
Labour	Richard Sargood	15,374		
Labour	Arthur Skeffington	15,354		
Conservative	Evan Cook	5,375		
Conservative	A. E. Fournier	5,235		
Conservative	W. Wilson	5,220		
Labour hold		Swing		
Labour hold		Swing		
Labour hold		Swing		

1955 London County Council election: Peckham
Party	Candidate	Votes	%	±%
Labour	Freda Corbet	11,430		
Labour	Arthur Skeffington	10,216		
Labour	Richard Sargood	10,156		
Conservative	Evan Cook	4,145		
Conservative	F. J. Whetstone	4,013		
Conservative	G. R. Blake	3,962		
Labour hold		Swing		
Labour hold		Swing		
Labour hold		Swing		

1958 London County Council election: Peckham
Party	Candidate	Votes	%	±%
Labour	Freda Corbet	11,419		
Labour	Richard Sargood	10,143		
Labour	Walter Allen	9,452		
Conservative	B. Jordan	2,198		
Conservative	G. W. Bentley	1,660		
Conservative	G. R. Blake	1,628		
Labour hold		Swing		
Labour hold		Swing		
Labour hold		Swing		

1961 London County Council election: Peckham
Party	Candidate	Votes	%	±%
Labour	Freda Corbet	11,871		
Labour	Walter Allen	10,117		
Labour	Richard Sargood	9,862		
Conservative	Toby Jessel	3,648		
Conservative	Alan Frank Lockwood	3,578		
Conservative	B. Jorden	3,408		
Labour hold		Swing		
Labour hold		Swing		
Labour hold		Swing		
