= Streatham (London County Council constituency) =

London County Council constituency

- Former constituency for the London County Council

Former constituency
- Created: 1919
- Abolished: 1965
- Member(s): 2 (to 1949); 3 (from 1949)
- Created from: Wandsworth

Streatham was a constituency used for elections to the London County Council between 1919 and the council's abolition, in 1965. The seat shared boundaries with the UK Parliament constituency of the same name.

== Councillors ==
Year	Name	Party	Name	Party	Name	Party
1919	Arthur Roberts	Municipal Reform	Clifford Thomas	Municipal Reform	Two seats until 1949	
1921	Arthur Roberts	Municipal Reform	Bertram Galer	Municipal Reform	Two seats until 1949	
1925	Elliott Mark	Municipal Reform	Bertram Galer	Municipal Reform	Two seats until 1949	
1946	Frank Henry Campbell	Conservative	Bertram Galer	Municipal Reform	Two seats until 1949	
1949	Albert Frederick Hopkinson	Conservative	George Mitchell	Conservative	Patrick Stirling	Conservative
1952	Gladys Rodwell Norris	Conservative	George Mitchell	Conservative	Patrick Stirling	Conservative
1955	Percy Gale	Conservative	Ian McLean	Conservative	Harold Sebag-Montefiore	Conservative
1961	Percy Gale	Conservative	Gerard Vaughan	Conservative	Frederick Weyer	Conservative

== Election results ==
1919 London County Council election: Streatham
Party	Candidate	Votes	%	±%
Municipal Reform	Arthur Roberts	Unopposed	n/a	n/a
Municipal Reform	Clifford Thomas	Unopposed	n/a	n/a
Municipal Reform hold		Swing	n/a	
Municipal Reform hold		Swing	n/a	

1922 London County Council election: Streatham
Party	Candidate	Votes	%	±%
Municipal Reform	Bertram Galer	Unopposed	n/a	n/a
Municipal Reform	Arthur Roberts	Unopposed	n/a	n/a
Municipal Reform hold		Swing	n/a	
Municipal Reform hold		Swing	n/a	

1925 London County Council election: Streatham
Party	Candidate	Votes	%	±%
Municipal Reform	Bertram Galer	Unopposed	n/a	n/a
Municipal Reform	Elliott Mark	Unopposed	n/a	n/a
Municipal Reform hold		Swing	n/a	
Municipal Reform hold		Swing	n/a	

1928 London County Council election: Streatham
Party	Candidate	Votes	%	±%
Municipal Reform	Frederic Bertram Galer	7,463		n/a
Municipal Reform	James Elliott Mark	7,416		n/a
Liberal	W. G. Jackson	2,058		n/a
Liberal	Basil Andrew Murray	2,005		n/a
Labour	R. C. Beresford	1,084		n/a
Labour	C. W. Dorrell	1,051		n/a
Municipal Reform hold		Swing	n/a	
Municipal Reform hold		Swing	n/a	

1931 London County Council election: Streatham
Party	Candidate	Votes	%	±%
Municipal Reform	Bertram Galer	7,100		
Municipal Reform	Elliott Mark	7,049		
Labour	R. C. Beresford	867		
Labour	S. C. Gilbey	830		
Municipal Reform hold		Swing		
Municipal Reform hold		Swing		

1934 London County Council election: Streatham
Party	Candidate	Votes	%	±%
Municipal Reform	Elliott Mark	8,007		
Municipal Reform	Bertram Galer	8,003		
Labour	P. O'Gorman	1,871		
Labour	F. Beswick	1,838		
Municipal Reform hold		Swing		
Municipal Reform hold		Swing		

1937 London County Council election: Streatham
Party	Candidate	Votes	%	±%
Municipal Reform	Bertram Galer	11,128		
Municipal Reform	Elliott Mark	10,970		
Labour	R. Jones	3,415		
Labour	M. C. Young	3,329		
Municipal Reform hold		Swing		
Municipal Reform hold		Swing		

1946 London County Council election: Streatham
Party	Candidate	Votes	%	±%
Conservative	Frank Henry Campbell	10,997		
Conservative	Bertram Galer	10,798		
Labour	A. E. Bennett	5,153		
Labour	P. Taylor	5,006		
Conservative hold		Swing		
Conservative hold		Swing		

1949 London County Council election: Streatham
Party	Candidate	Votes	%	±%
Conservative	George Mitchell	19,775		
Conservative	Albert Frederick Hopkinson	19,764		
Conservative	Patrick Stirling	19,668		
Labour	E. G. F. Griffiths	8,339		
Labour	M. J. Manning	8,324		
Labour	A. R. Wilson	8,198		
Conservative win (new seat)				
Conservative hold		Swing		
Conservative hold		Swing		

1952 London County Council election: Streatham
Party	Candidate	Votes	%	±%
Conservative	George Mitchell	16,181		
Conservative	Patrick Stirling	15,741		
Conservative	Gladys Rodwell Norris	15,669		
Labour	W. Morley	7,267		
Labour	R. Millar	7,107		
Labour	W. Toynbee	7,075		
Conservative hold		Swing		
Conservative hold		Swing		
Conservative hold		Swing		

1955 London County Council election: Streatham
Party	Candidate	Votes	%	±%
Conservative	Harold Sebag-Montefiore	12,869		
Conservative	Ian McLean	12,803		
Conservative	Percy Gale	12,686		
Labour	P. C. Gibson	5,213		
Labour	E. H. Horstead	5,138		
Labour	P. J. Hendrie	5,109		
Liberal	J. P. Barton	518		
Liberal	T. G. Hill	417		
Independent	Bill Boaks	413		
Liberal	E. C. Codd	390		
Conservative hold		Swing		
Conservative hold		Swing		
Conservative hold		Swing		

1958 London County Council election: Streatham
Party	Candidate	Votes	%	±%
Conservative	Percy Gale	10,132		
Conservative	Ian McLean	10,102		
Conservative	Harold Sebag-Montefiore	9,894		
Labour	P. C. Gibson	6,484		
Labour	E. H. Horstead	6,445		
Labour	P. J. Hendrie	6,281		
Liberal	W. B. Mattinson	2,780		
Independent	Bill Boaks	552		
Conservative hold		Swing		
Conservative hold		Swing		
Conservative hold		Swing		

1961 London County Council election: Streatham
Party	Candidate	Votes	%	±%
Conservative	Gerard Vaughan	11,803		
Conservative	Percy Gale	11,682		
Conservative	Frederick Weyer	11,283		
Labour	F. Sims	4,717		
Labour	M. J. Verden	4,540		
Labour	A. J. Crouch	4,456		
Liberal	Anthony Cowen	2,381		
Liberal	P. E. Winner	2,117		
Liberal	C. Barrington-Ward	1,783		
Independent	Bill Boaks	669		
Conservative hold		Swing		
Conservative hold		Swing		
Conservative hold		Swing		
