= Fred Powe =

British politician

Frederick William Powe (7 July 1903 – 15 March 1990) was a British politician, who served on the London County Council and Greater London Council.

== Early life ==
Powe was born in at Great Waltham in Essex.

== Political career ==
Powe joined the Labour Party in 1923. He became secretary of the St Pancras North Labour Party in 1926 and later became the chairman. In 1928 he was elected to St Pancras Metropolitan Borough Council. At the 1937 London County Council election, he was elected in Fulham East, and served until he lost the seat in 1949. In 1946/47, he additionally served as Mayor of St Pancras.

Powe was re-elected in the 1952 London County Council election, having switched to represent Islington South West. In 1948, when Frank Coombes, vice chair of the council, died, Powe was elected to serve the remainder of his term. He became the leader of St Pancras Council, on which he worked closely with the Conservative Party opposition. By the mid-1950s, he was facing significant opposition from his backbenchers and when, in 1956, they voted to overturn an agreement he had made to nominate five Conservatives as aldermen, he resigned, to be replaced by John Lawrence. He was a member of St Pancras Borough Council until 1959.

At the 1955 and 1959 general elections, Powe stood unsuccessfully in Harrow Central.

He remained a member of London County Council until its abolition, in 1965. He was elected to its replacement, the Greater London Council, representing Hounslow until 1967. He was a councillor on Hounslow London Borough Council from 1967 to 1968 and again from 1971 to 1982, first elected for Feltham North at the 1967 by-election. He stood unsuccessfully for Heston West at the 1968 election. At the 1971 election he was elected for Cranford. He was re-elected in 1974. He was Mayor of Hounslow for the 1971/2 municipal year.

== Personal life ==
Powe worked for British Rail as a representative for 47 years, retiring in 1966.

Civic offices
Preceded by Frank Lawrence Combes	Mayor of St Pancras; 1946–1947	Succeeded by Lilian Bryant
Preceded by Vic Wright	Mayor of Hounslow; 1971–1972	Succeeded by Michael Slattery
