= Olive Deer =

British politician

Olive Gertrude Deer (née Stoakes; 31 July 1897 – 20 April 1983) was a British politician.

Born Olive Stoakes, she grew up in Cleethorpes, in Lincolnshire, where she attended the Barcroft Street School. She married Labour Party activist George Deer in 1916, and became involved in the party herself.

From 1921, Deer served on the Ministry of Labour Exchange Committee, and from 1922 on her local Board of Guardians. She was elected to Lincoln City Council in 1945, and served on the board of the Lincoln Co-operative Society, chairing it from 1946 to 1948. George was elected to Parliament at the 1945 UK general election, and after a few years the couple relocated to London. She was appointed as an alderman on London County Council in 1952, serving until 1958, when she switched to become a councillor for Shoreditch and Finsbury. From 1955 to 1962, she chaired the council's Welfare Committee, then in 1962/63 she was chair of the council.

Olive and George both retired in 1964 and returned to Lincolnshire. She was elected to Grimsby Borough Council in 1964, serving until 1967.

Civic offices
Preceded by Harold Shearman	Chair of London County Council; 1962–1963	Succeeded by Reginald Stamp
