= Shoreditch (London County Council constituency) =

London County Council constituency

- Former constituency for the London County Council

Former constituency
- Created: 1919
- Abolished: 1949
- Member(s): 2
- Created from: Haggerston and Hoxton
- Replaced by: Shoreditch and Finsbury

Shoreditch was a constituency used for elections to the London County Council between 1919 and 1949. The seat shared boundaries with the UK Parliament constituency of the same name.

== Councillors ==
Year	Name	Party	Name	Party
1919	Charles Edward Taylor	Labour	Henry Ward	Progressive
1922	Frank Stanley Henwood	Progressive	Henry Ward	Progressive
1925	Thomas John Sillitoe	Labour	Alfred Walton	Labour
1931	Henrietta Girling	Labour	Santo Jeger	Labour
1946	Henrietta Girling	Labour	Dorothy Thurtle	Labour

== Election results ==
1919 London County Council election: Shoreditch
Party	Candidate	Votes	%	±%
Progressive	Henry Ward	1,701		
Labour	Charles Edward Taylor	1,464	35.3	
Progressive	Godfrey Vick	1,454		
Municipal Reform	W. Weber	1,116		
Municipal Reform	Rosamund Smith	1,110		
Progressive hold		Swing		
Labour gain from Progressive		Swing		

1922 London County Council election: Shoreditch
Party	Candidate	Votes	%	±%
Progressive	Henry Ward	4,015	28.7	
Progressive	Frank Stanley Henwood	3,814	27.2	
Labour	Charles Edward Taylor	3,215	23.0	
Labour	Alfred Walton	2,930	21.0	
Majority		599	4.2	
Progressive gain from Labour		Swing		
Progressive hold		Swing		

1925 London County Council election: Shoreditch
Party	Candidate	Votes	%	±%
Labour	Thomas John Sillitoe	4,894		
Labour	Alfred Walton	4,876		
Municipal Reform	Moyra Goff	3,845		
Municipal Reform	J. E. Harwood	3,840		
Majority				
Labour gain from Progressive		Swing		
Labour gain from Progressive		Swing		

1928 London County Council election: Shoreditch
Party	Candidate	Votes	%	±%
Labour	Thomas John Sillitoe	5,704		
Labour	Alfred Walton	5,573		
Liberal	Joseph Samuel Baker	4,286		
Liberal	James Edward Houseman	4,248		
Municipal Reform	Lois Sturt	2,770		
Municipal Reform	Napier Sturt	2,725		
Majority				
Labour hold		Swing		
Labour hold		Swing		

1931 London County Council election: Shoreditch
Party	Candidate	Votes	%	±%
Labour	Santo Jeger	4,608		
Labour	Henrietta Girling	4,588		
Liberal	James Edward Houseman	2,677		
Liberal	George James Lusher-Pentney	2,376		
Municipal Reform	W. J. Fudge	2,092		
Municipal Reform	T. E. Crofts	2,013		
Majority				
Labour hold		Swing		
Labour hold		Swing		

1934 London County Council election: Shoreditch
Party	Candidate	Votes	%	±%
Labour	Henrietta Girling	9,071		
Labour	Santo Jeger	8,888		
People's Party	James Edward Houseman	3,675		
People's Party	M. Christie	3,665		
Majority				
Labour hold		Swing		
Labour hold		Swing		

1937 London County Council election: Shoreditch
Party	Candidate	Votes	%	±%
Labour	Henrietta Girling	11,098		
Labour	Santo Jeger	11,069		
Municipal Reform	S. L. Price	3,303		
Municipal Reform	R. S. Falk	3,217		
British Union of Fascists	William Joyce	2,564		
British Union of Fascists	J. A. Bailey	2,492		
Ind. Labour Party	C. E. Taylor	385		
Majority				
Labour hold		Swing		
Labour hold		Swing		

1946 London County Council election: Shoreditch
Party	Candidate	Votes	%	±%
Labour	Dorothy Thurtle	2,925		
Labour	Henrietta Girling	2,756		
British People's Party	J. Harris	509		
British People's Party	E. P. Epstein	490		
Majority				
Labour hold		Swing		
Labour hold		Swing		
