= Battersea North (London County Council constituency) =

London County Council constituency

- Former constituency for the London County Council

Former constituency
- Created: 1919
- Abolished: 1965
- Member(s): 2 (to 1949); 3 (from 1949)
- Created from: Battersea

Battersea North was a constituency used for elections to the London County Council between 1919 and the council's abolition, in 1965. The seat shared boundaries with the UK Parliament constituency of the same name.

== Councillors ==
Year	Name	Party	Name	Party	Name	Party
1919	Joseph George Butler	Labour	Alf Watts	Labour	Two seats until 1949	
1925	Joseph George Butler	Labour	Caroline Ganley	Labour	Two seats until 1949	
1928	Morris Boscawen Savage	Municipal Reform	Edgar John Sainsbury	Municipal Reform	Two seats until 1949	
1931	Vincent Clarke	Municipal Reform	Edgar John Sainsbury	Municipal Reform	Two seats until 1949	
1934	Francis Douglas	Labour	Caroline Ganley	Labour	Two seats until 1949	
1937	Francis Douglas	Labour	Ewart Gladstone Culpin	Labour	Two seats until 1949	
1946	Douglas Prichard	Labour	J. S. Wilkie	Labour	Two seats until 1949	
1947	Douglas Prichard	Labour	Marjorie McIntosh	Labour	Two seats until 1949	
1949	Douglas Prichard	Labour	Marjorie McIntosh	Labour	Frederick Humphrey	Labour
1952	Douglas Prichard	Labour	William Hare	Labour	Eric Hurst	Labour
1958	Douglas Prichard	Labour	Helen Kiely	Labour	Eric Hurst	Labour
1961	Peggy Jay	Labour	Helen Kiely	Labour	Joseph Simeon Samuels	Labour

== Election results ==
1919 London County Council election: Battersea North
Party	Candidate	Votes	%	±%
Labour	Joseph George Butler	2,635	28.7	
Labour	Alf Watts	2,518	27.4	
Municipal Reform	William Watts	2,019	22.0	
Municipal Reform	G. L. B. Rees	2,003	21.8	
Majority		499	5.4	
Labour hold		Swing		
Labour hold		Swing		

1922 London County Council election: Battersea North
Party	Candidate	Votes	%	±%
Labour	Joseph George Butler	6,585		
Labour	Alf Watts	6,557		
Municipal Reform	William Watts	4,686		
Municipal Reform	Charles James Allpass	4,669		
Labour hold		Swing		
Labour hold		Swing		

1925 London County Council election: Battersea North
Party	Candidate	Votes	%	±%
Labour	Joseph George Butler	5,960		
Labour	Caroline Ganley	5,924		
Municipal Reform	A. P. Godfrey	4,133		
Municipal Reform	A. Hudson	4,044		
Labour hold		Swing		

1928 London County Council election: Battersea North
Party	Candidate	Votes	%	±%
Municipal Reform	Morris Boscawen Savage	5,089		
Municipal Reform	Edgar John Sainsbury	5,081		
Labour	Joseph George Butler	4,302		
Labour	Caroline Ganley	4,148		
Independent Labour	J. G. Clancey	2,697		
Independent Labour	M. Varran	2,265		
Municipal Reform gain from Labour		Swing		
Municipal Reform gain from Labour		Swing		

1931 London County Council election: Battersea North
Party	Candidate	Votes	%	±%
Municipal Reform	Edgar John Sainsbury	4,781		
Municipal Reform	Vincent Clarke	4,647		
Labour	Caroline Ganley	4,107		
Labour	Francis Douglas	3,969		
Communist	Shapurji Saklatvala	728		
Communist	Ellen Usher	535		
Municipal Reform hold		Swing		

1934 London County Council election: Battersea North
Party	Candidate	Votes	%	±%
Labour	Francis Douglas	8,334		
Labour	Caroline Ganley	8,325		
Municipal Reform	Vincent Clarke	4,549		
Municipal Reform	Edgar John Sainsbury	4,459		
Communist	Shapurji Saklatvala	577		
Communist	B. Johnson	526		
Labour gain from Municipal Reform		Swing		
Labour gain from Municipal Reform		Swing		

1937 London County Council election: Battersea North
Party	Candidate	Votes	%	±%
Labour	Ewart Culpin	9,922		
Labour	Francis Douglas	9,847		
Municipal Reform	Vincent Clarke	4,766		
Municipal Reform	Edgar John Sainsbury	4,645		
Labour hold		Swing		

1946 London County Council election: Battersea North
Party	Candidate	Votes	%	±%
Labour	Douglas Prichard	5,266		
Labour	J. S. Wilkie	5,232		
Conservative	W. Harris	1,324		
Conservative	Stewart Skingle	1,316		
Labour hold		Swing		

1949 London County Council election: Battersea North
Party	Candidate	Votes	%	±%
Labour	Marjorie McIntosh	10,345		
Labour	Douglas Prichard	10,215		
Labour	Frederick Humphrey	10,107		
Conservative	Ian Percival	5,437		
Conservative	N. Johnston	5,151		
Conservative	A. S. Clarke	5,030		
Labour hold		Swing		

1952 London County Council election: Battersea North
Party	Candidate	Votes	%	±%
Labour	Douglas Prichard	13,662		
Labour	William Hare	13,161		
Labour	Eric Hurst	13,130		
Conservative	W. C. Jones	4,536		
Conservative	E. Morley	4,307		
Conservative	H. W. Sendall	4,236		
Labour hold		Swing		

1955 London County Council election: Battersea North
Party	Candidate	Votes	%	±%
Labour	Douglas Prichard	9,023		
Labour	Eric Hurst	8,774		
Labour	William Hare	8,641		
Conservative	J. S. Ingram	3,385		
Conservative	H. W. Sendall	3,264		
Conservative	M. R. Shrimpton	3,162		
Communist	J. Evans	697		
Labour hold		Swing		

1958 London County Council election: Battersea North
Party	Candidate	Votes	%	±%
Labour	Douglas Prichard	9,948		
Labour	Eric Hurst	9,686		
Labour	Helen Kieley	9,444		
Conservative	H. W. Sendall	2,210		
Conservative	M. D. Thomas	2,091		
Conservative	H. C. E. Bulley	2,063		
Communist	J. Evans	863		
Labour hold		Swing		

1961 London County Council election: Battersea North
Party	Candidate	Votes	%	±%
Labour	Peggy Jay	10,061		
Labour	Helen Kieley	8,715		
Labour	Joseph Simeon Samuels	8,555		
Conservative	G. E. Currie	3,617		
Conservative	E. de Bourbel	3,383		
Conservative	W. W. Thornely	3,239		
Communist	J. Evans	1,204		
Labour hold		Swing		
