= Southwark (London County Council constituency) =

London County Council constituency

- Former constituency for the London County Council

Former constituency
- Created: 1949
- Abolished: 1965
- Member(s): 3

Southwark was a constituency used for elections to the London County Council between 1949 and the council's abolition, in 1965. The seat shared boundaries with the UK Parliament constituency of the same name.

== Councillors ==
Year	Name	Party	Name	Party	Name	Party
1949	John Keen	Labour	Albert Bernard Kennedy	Labour	James Hyndman MacDonnell	Labour
1955	John Keen	Labour	Henry Stillman	Labour	Leonard Styles	Labour
1961	John Keen	Labour	Henry Stillman	Labour	Albert Gates	Labour

== Election results ==
1949 London County Council election: Southwark
Party	Candidate	Votes	%	±%
Labour	Albert Bernard Kennedy	13,250		
Labour	John Keen	13,040		
Labour	James Hyndman MacDonnell	12,569		
Conservative	G. H. Kirby-Smith	6,865		
Conservative	A. Hendries	6,808		
Conservative	A. I. Robin	6,375		

1952 London County Council election: Southwark
Party	Candidate	Votes	%	±%
Labour	Albert Bernard Kennedy	16,372		
Labour	John Keen	15,885		
Labour	James Hyndman MacDonnell	15,328		
Conservative	James Greenwood	3,719		
Conservative	G. H. Kirby-Smith	3,065		
Conservative	H. Russell	2,247		
Communist	T. C. Fuller	841		
Communist	Joe Bent	741		
Communist	J. Mills	611		
Labour hold		Swing		

1955 London County Council election: Southwark
Party	Candidate	Votes	%	±%
Labour	Henry Stillman	10,819		
Labour	John Keen	10,751		
Labour	Leonard Styles	10,747		
Conservative	James Greenwood	2,394		
Conservative	H. Golding	1,891		
Conservative	R. Cummins	1,835		
Communist	T. C. Fuller	604		
Independent	W. Field	551		
Communist	Nell Vyse	511		
Communist	Joe Bent	443		
Labour hold		Swing		

1958 London County Council election: Southwark
Party	Candidate	Votes	%	±%
Labour	John Keen	11,721		
Labour	Henry Stillman	11,702		
Labour	Leonard Styles	11,643		
Conservative	R. Cummins	1,210		
Conservative	H. Golding	1,205		
Conservative	J. Harrison	1,125		
Communist	Joe Bent	605		
Labour hold		Swing		

1961 London County Council election: Southwark
Party	Candidate	Votes	%	±%
Labour	John Keen	11,807		
Labour	Albert Gates	11,742		
Labour	Henry Stillman	11,546		
Conservative	R. Cummins	2,861		
Conservative	J. E. Pound	2,849		
Conservative	H. Golding	2,822		
Communist	Joe Bent	1,320		
Labour hold		Swing		
