= Harold Shearman =

British politician and educationalist

Sir Harold Charles Shearman (14 March 1896 – 24 March 1984) was a British socialist politician and educationalist, who served as chair of both the London County Council and Greater London Council.

Shearman attended Sulgrave National School, then Magdalen College School, Brackley, Wolsingham Grammar School, and finally St Edmund Hall, Oxford, from which he graduated with a first-class honours degree in modern history. In 1912, he became an elementary school teacher in Durham, but he left in 1915 to serve in World War I. He first served with the Royal Army Medical Corps, and then with the Royal Air Force, within which he was a flying officer (observer).

After the war, Shearman became active in the Labour Party, and at the 1922 UK general election, he unsuccessfully contested the Isle of Wight. From 1927, he worked for the Workers' Educational Association, until 1946, when he was elected to London County Council as an alderman. At the 1952 London County Council election, he switched to become a councillor, representing Deptford.

On the council, Shearman took an interest in educational matters, and from 1955 he was the chair of the council's education committee. He left that position in 1961, to become the chair of the council. In 1964, the new Greater London Council was established and Shearman was elected to represent Lewisham. He was elected as the first Chairman of the Greater London Council, serving until 1966. From 1964 to 1965, he additionally served as chair of the Inner London Education Authority. He stood down from the council at the 1967 Greater London Council election.

In his spare time, Shearman served on numerous committees, including the Committee on Higher Education, Commonwealth Scholarship Commission, and as chair of the School Journey Association of London and the Metropolitan Examinations Board. In retirement, he served on the court of Brunel University, the senate of the University of London, and as chair of the South Bank Polytechnic. He stood down from the last of his posts in 1976, and died eight years later.

Civic offices
| Preceded by Florence Cayford | Chair of London County Council; 1961–1962 | Succeeded by Olive Deer |
| Preceded by New position | Chair of the Inner London Education Authority; 1964–1965 | Succeeded by Ashley Bramall |
| Preceded by New position | Chairman of the Greater London Council; 1964–1966 | Succeeded by Herbert Ferguson |
