= Borough of Southwark =

Borough of Southwark could refer to:

- London Borough of Southwark (1965—present)
- Metropolitan Borough of Southwark (1900–1965)
- Ancient borough of Southwark
