= Molly Bolton =

British politician

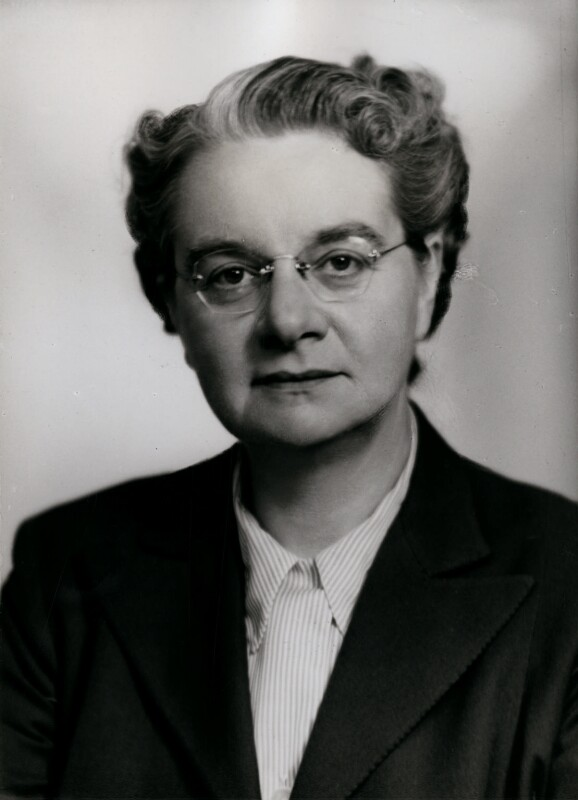
- Born: Ivy Mabel Schmidt; 26 January 1897; London
- Died: 2 January 1991 (aged 93); London
- Occupations: Labour politician, Chairman of London County Council

Ivy Molly Bolton (26 January 1897 – 2 January 1991) was a British politician, elected both as Vice Chair and Chairman of London County Council in 1953.

== Early life ==
Ivy Mabel Schmidt was born on 26 January 1897 to Alice (née Algar) and Leonard Schmidt, a hairdresser, the middle of three children. She was baptised on 4 April 1897 in the Parish of St. Andrew, Haverstock Hill in London Borough of Camden. The family lived in Kentish Town at the time of her birth, later moving to Hampstead.

== Career ==
Bolton joined the Fabian Society in 1916, and became private secretary to Beatrice and Sydney Webb. She then became secretary of the Fabian Local Government and Research Bureau, and assistant editor of Local Government News, and served on the society's executive committee.

At the London County Council election, 1934, Bolton was elected as a Labour Party candidate in Hackney North one of the women alongside Margaret Cole and Peggy Jay who made up 23% of the LCC Labour group. She held the seat and its successor, Stoke Newington and Hackney North, until 1952. That year, she became an alderman, and she was chair of the council in 1953/54. When the council was dissolved, in 1965, she retired.

In October 1934 she was the first woman to become one of London County Council's six representatives on the London and Home Counties Joint Electricity Authority.

She was appointed to Crawley New Town Development Corporation 1947–56 a member of the working group developing a master Plan for Crawley alongside Sir Thomas Penberthy Bennett, Lawrence Neal, Alwyn Sheppard Fidler, Caroline Haslett, Sir Edward Gillett, Eric Walter Pasold and Alderman James Marshall.

The National Portrait Gallery hold a photograph of Molly Bolton by Elliott & Fry in its collections.

== Personal life ==
In 1922 she married Douglas Joseph Bolton (1890-1983) an electrical engineer and lecturer at Regent Street Polytechnic, in St Albans. On 6 November 1958, the couple sailed to Penang on the ship MS Oranje.

Civic offices
Preceded by Arthur Edward Middleton	Chairman of the London County Council; 1953–1954	Succeeded by Victor Mishcon
