= Donald Daines =

British politician (1900–1956)

Donald Himson Daines (1900 – 30 October 1956) was a British politician, a leading figure in the London Labour Party.

Born in Norwich, Daines joined the local branch of the Independent Labour Party. After World War I, he moved to Bermondsey, in London, then in 1925 was elected to Leyton Borough Council. In 1929, he was made an alderman on the council, and in 1930 he served as deputy mayor.

The secretary of the London Labour Party was Herbert Morrison, who became a government minister in 1940. Daines took over as acting secretary of the party, a full-time post. That year, he was also appointed to London County Council, to represent Kensington North. In 1945, he was instead appointed as an alderman on the council, then at the 1949 London County Council election, he won a seat in Shoreditch and Finsbury.

In 1947, Daines was finally appointed as permanent secretary of the London Labour Party. The following year, he was also appointed to a committee planning a new town at Welwyn Garden City and Hatfield. He later won election to the Welwyn Urban District Council, while remaining a member of the London County Council, and chairing its finance committee. He died, still in office, in 1956.

Party political offices
Preceded by Herbert Morrison	Secretary of the London Labour Party; 1947–1956	Succeeded by Peter Robshaw
Political offices
Preceded by Francis Douglas	Chairman of the Finance Committee of London County Council; 1946–1956	Succeeded by Norman Prichard
