= Marjorie McIntosh (politician) =

British politician

Marjorie Eleanor McIntosh (1907 – 6 May 1964) was a British politician, who served on London County Council.

Born Marjorie Betts, she was the daughter of Frank Betts, of Pontefract, later of Bradford, and Hyde, near Manchester, where she grew up, and was the older sister of Barbara Castle. She was educated at St Hugh's College, Oxford, and joined the Labour Party, winning election to Birmingham City Council. In 1932, she married Alistair John McIntosh, principal of the City of London College and a lecturer in transport studies.

By 1947, McIntosh had moved to London, and that year she was elected to represent Battersea North on the London County Council. She served on its education committee, for a period chairing the committee, while working as a lecturer in the social sciences at Bedford College. In 1952, she was appointed by the county council as an alderman, meaning that she did not need to be elected again. In the 1964 election to the new Greater London Council, she won a seat in Hammersmith. She took part in planning the creation of the Inner London Education Authority, but was taken ill and died before it or the Greater London Council were formally established.
