= Victor Mishcon, Baron Mishcon =

British solicitor and Labour politician (1915–2006)

The Right Honourable The Lord Mishcon QC DL
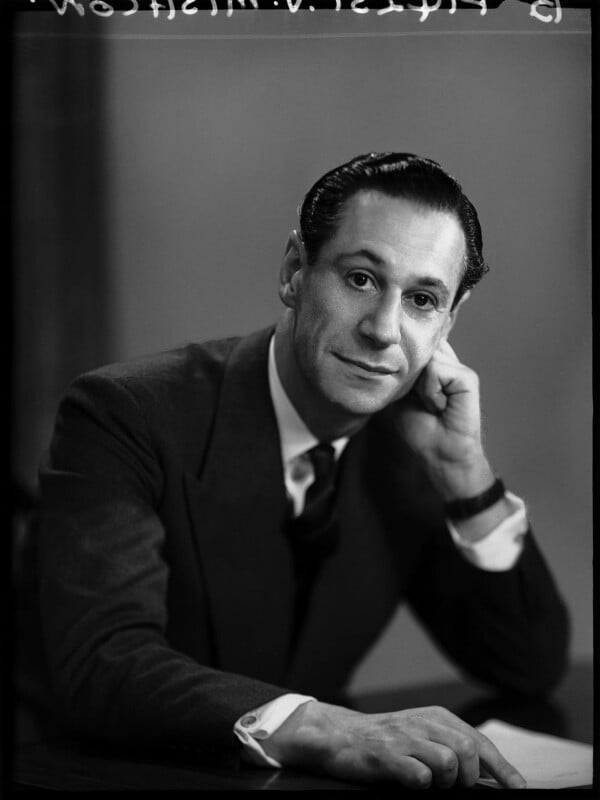
- Mishcon in 1951

Shadow Lord Chancellor
- In office 9 January 1989 – 18 July 1992
- Leader: Neil Kinnock
- Preceded by: The Lord Elwyn-Jones
- Succeeded by: The Lord Irvine of Lairg

Member of the House of Lords
- Lord Temporal
- Life peerage 10 May 1978 – 28 January 2006

Personal details
- Born: 14 August 1915 London, England
- Died: 27 January 2006 (aged 90) London, England
- Party: Labour

Victor Mishcon, Baron Mishcon, QC, DL (14 August 1915 – 27 January 2006) was a leading British solicitor and a Labour politician. His firm acted for Diana, Princess of Wales in her divorce.

The Mishcon Lectures were established at University College, London in 1990 in honour of Lord Mishcon to mark his 75th birthday and in recognition of his achievements and service in the fields of law, education, religion, government and politics, both central and local.

== Early life ==
Mishcon was born in Brixton, south London, the son of Arnold Mishcon, a rabbi who emigrated from Russian Poland, and his wife Queenie. He was educated at the City of London School. He studied law and founded the firm of solicitors Victor Mishcon & Co in Brixton in 1937.

== Labour Party ==
An active member of the Labour Party, Mishcon served as a Councillor on Lambeth Borough Council from 1945 to 1948, and represented Brixton on London County Council from 1946 to 1964. He was chairman of London County Council in 1954—then aged 39, the youngest chair that century. He was elected to the successor Greater London Council for Lambeth 1964–67. He stood without success as a Labour party candidate in four parliamentary elections, in Leeds North-West in 1950; in Bath in 1951; and in Gravesend in 1955 and 1959.

He was made a life peer on 10 May 1978 as Baron Mishcon, of Lambeth in Greater London on the recommendation of the Prime Minister, James Callaghan. Lord Mishcon was Labour home affairs spokesman in the House of Lords from 1983 to 1990 and served as shadow Lord Chancellor from 1990 to 1992.

== Legal career ==
Victor Mishcon was one of 15 men and women who sat on the 1954–1957 British Government appointed Wolfenden Committee which considered the law and practice of homosexual offences and treatment of persons convicted of such offences in British courts, and to review prostitution offences.

His firm acted for Ruth Ellis in her divorce but not in her later murder trial, and for Jeffrey Archer in his libel suit against the Daily Star, which had claimed that Archer had had sex with a prostitute. Archer won damages of £500,000, but was later convicted of perjury and repaid over £1,500,000.

In 1988, Victor Mishcon & Co merged with part of Bartletts de Reya, forming the law firm Mishcon de Reya. Mishcon played a prominent role in The Princess of Wales's divorce from The Prince of Wales.

In 1992, he retired as senior partner of Mishcon de Reya, but remained a consultant. In the same year, he became the first practising solicitor to be made an honorary Queen's Counsel, on the recommendation of the Lord Chancellor, Lord Mackay of Clashfern. In 1994 he was made an Honorary Member of the Law Society.

== Other activities ==
Mishcon was a board member of the Royal National Theatre 1965–90 and the South Bank Centre 1966–67. He served as vice-president of the Board of Deputies of British Jews 1967–73 and vice-chair of the Council of Christians and Jews 1976–77.

He was chairman of the Institute of Jewish Studies, University College, London, and the honorary president of the British Technion Society. He was a governor of Technion, Israel, president of the Association of Jewish Youth and of the British Council and the Shaare Zedek Hospital, Jerusalem.

He was awarded the Star of Ethiopia in 1954 and the Star of Jordan in 1995 for his work in the Middle East peace process. Between 1984 and 1990 he had acted as a secret intermediary in negotiations between King Hussein of Jordan and the Israeli foreign minister Shimon Peres, offering the use of his country house.

== Family ==
Lord Mishcon was married four times. His second marriage, to Beryl Honor Posnansky, produced two sons, Peter and Russell and a daughter, Jane. He married his fourth wife, Joan Estelle Conrad, in 1976; the marriage was dissolved in 2001. In 2006, he died at his home in Bayswater, London.

== In popular culture ==
Lord Mishcon was portrayed by Laurence Payne in the Granada Television series Lady Killers, in an episode depicting the trial of Ruth Ellis.

== Arms ==
Coat of arms of Victor Mishcon, Baron Mishcon
Crest Upon a wreath Argent and Azure a lion Or and a lamb Proper rampant and supporting between them a sword erect Gules the pommel resting on a book bound Azure edged and garnished Gold. Escutcheon Per pale Argent and Azure between in chief and in base bar bennel wavy counterchanged a tent per pale Azure and Argent lined Gules. Supporters Dexter a lamb reguardant Proper gorged with a collar Gules with flames issuing above and below Proper sinister a lion reguardant Or gorged with a Saxon crown Azure. Motto Dwell in Peace

Civic offices
Preceded by Molly Bolton	Chair of the London County Council; 1954–1955	Succeeded by Norman Prichard
Political offices
Preceded by The Lord Elwyn-Jones	Shadow Lord Chancellor; 1989–1992	Succeeded by The Lord Irvine of Lairg
