= Edwin Bayliss =

British politician

Bayliss in 1950

Edwin Bayliss OBE (1894 – 30 March 1971), was a British politician who was notably Chairman of the London County Council.

== Background ==
Bayliss was born the son of Edwin Bayliss of Wolverhampton. He was educated at Nottingham College. In 1913, he married Lily Smithers. They had two sons. Lily died in 1948. In 1949, Bayliss married Constance Shipley. He was awarded the OBE in 1960.

== Political career ==
Bayliss was a member of the executive of the Midlands Liberal Federation. He served on the Nottingham Board of guardians. He had a particular interest in industrial matters and ex-servicemen issues (being a founding member of the British Legion, for which he published articles. In November 1925, he was selected as prospective Liberal Party candidate for the Belper division of Derbyshire. However, he did not contest the seat. He was Liberal candidate in the 1926 Smethwick by-election. This made him the first Liberal to contest Smethwick since the constituency was created in 1918. Lloyd George had just taken over as Liberal Leader and was keen to see Liberals contesting as many seats as possible. Bayliss came in third with 9% of the vote. He was Liberal candidate for the Rossendale division of Lancashire at the 1929 General Election. He was not planning to contest the election, but the adopted Liberal candidate fell ill at the last minute and withdrew. Rossendale had been a Liberal seat until it was lost in 1918 to a coalition government backed Unionist. The Liberals had come within 2,000 votes of winning it back in 1923 before falling to third place in 1924. Bayliss lifted the Liberal share of the vote to 34%, which was only good enough to recapture second place, falling 800 votes short of victory. He did not stand for parliament again. He was to move south to London where, after World War II, he had a long municipal career in the Labour Party, representing Islington East on the London County Council and then Islington on the Greater London Council. From 1952-53, he was chair of the council.

=== Electoral record ===
1926 Smethwick by-election
Party	Candidate	Votes	%	±%
Labour	Oswald Ernald Mosley	16,077	57.1	+4.8
Unionist	Marshall James Pike	9,495	33.7	−14.0
Liberal	Edwin Bayliss	2,600	9.2	N/A
Majority		6,582	23.4	+18.8
Turnout		35,862	78.6	+0.4
Labour hold		Swing	−9.4	

General Election 1929: Rossendale
Party	Candidate	Votes	%	±%
Labour	Arthur Law	14,624	36.0	+3.6
Liberal	Edwin Bayliss	13,747	33.9	+8.0
Unionist	Sir Wilfrid Hart Sugden	12,225	30.1	−11.6
Majority		877	2.1	11.4
Turnout			87.7	
Labour gain from Unionist		Swing	-2.2	

Civic offices
Preceded by John William Bowen	Chairman of the London County Council; 1952 – 1953	Succeeded by Arthur Edward Middleton
