= Arthur Edward Middleton =

British politician

Arthur Edward Middleton (2 November 1891 – 19 October 1953) was a British politician who served as the Chair of London County Council.

Middleton qualified as an accountant and served on the council of the Society of Incorporated Accountants and Auditors. He was a supporter of the Labour Party, and in 1942 was appointed to London County Council as an alderman. In 1946, he was elected to represent Islington North on the council, and then from 1952 he again served as an alderman. In addition, he served on the Royal Commission on the Press.

In April 1953, Middleton was elected as chair of London County Council, and in July he was knighted. However, he died suddenly in October.

Civic offices
Preceded by Edwin Bayliss	Chairman of the London County Council; 1953	Succeeded by Molly Bolton
