= Florence Cayford =

English Labour politician

Dame Florence Evelyne Cayford DBE JP (14 June 1897 – 25 February 1987) was a Labour politician in London.

From 1937 to 1965, Cayford served as a member of Hampstead Borough Council, leading the Labour group from 1945 to 1958. She sat an alderman on the London County Council, and later as a Shoreditch and Finsbury county councillor. She served as chair of the council in 1960. She continued as a councillor on the newly formed Camden London Borough Council from 1964, serving as Deputy Mayor from 1967 to 1968, and Mayor from 1968 to 1969, and represented Islington on the Greater London Council from 1964 to 1967.

In the 1965 Birthday Honours, she was appointed Dame Commander of the Most Excellent Order of the British Empire (DBE) for "political and public services". In 1968, she saw foundation stone laid for what would become Webheath.

Civic offices
Preceded by Sidney Barton	Chairman of the London County Council; 1960–1961	Succeeded by Harold Shearman
