= Barrie Lambert =

Physician and medical administrator

Dame Florence Barraclough Lambert DBE (13 August 1871 – 11 December 1957), commonly known as Barrie Lambert or Florence Barrie Lambert, was an English nurse, later physician and public health administrator.

Lambert was born in Northwick Park, Harrow, London, the daughter of Thomas Henry Lambert, a solicitor and coal importer, and his wife, Sarah Ann (née Harrison). She was educated in France and then trained as a nurse at the London Hospital from 1895 to 1898.

From 1899 to 1901, she served in the South African War as a nursing sister with the Imperial Yeomanry. On her return to England she trained as a doctor at the London School of Medicine for Women, qualifying as MBBS from the University of Durham in 1906. In 1907, she obtained a Diploma in Public Health from the University of Cambridge.

With a private income, Lambert devoted much time to voluntary child welfare work, becoming honorary director of the Central Council for Infant and Child Welfare, honorary secretary of the Central Council for the Care of Cripples, and a member of council of the Invalid Children's Aid Society. She undertook postgraduate study in physical medicine at Stockholm University and then obtained her first paid medical position as physician-in-charge of the mechano-therapeutic department of the Charing Cross Hospital in London and worked in the departments at St Mary's Hospital and the Royal Free Hospital.

In 1915, she was appointed Inspector of Military Massage and Electrical Services in the Royal Army Medical Corps with the honorary rank of major and also became a member of the Electro-Medical Committee of the War Office. She held these posts throughout the rest of the First World War until, in 1919, she was appointed a medical officer with the new Ministry of Health, responsible for the inspection of local authority child welfare and orthopaedic services throughout the country. She was appointed Commander of the Order of the British Empire (CBE) in January 1920 for her wartime services.

In 1921, however, she resigned to enter politics. In March 1922 she was elected an alderman of London County Council for the Municipal Reform Party (Conservative Party from 1945) and almost immediately joined the Public Health Committee, chairing it from 1928. In 1930, it became the Central Health Committee and later the Hospital and Medical Services Committee and took over the 76 hospitals formerly administered by the Metropolitan Asylums Board.

She remained chairman until 1934, when the Municipal Reform Party lost its majority, but continued to sit on the committee and co-operate closely with her successor as chairman, Somerville Hastings. In 1938, she was appointed Dame Commander of the Order of the British Empire (DBE).

With the creation of the National Health Service in 1948, she was appointed to the South-East Metropolitan Regional Hospital Board and chaired the Nursing Committee. She also continued to sit on the LCC Health Committee until she resigned from the council in 1952. She was also vice-president of the Medical Defence Union.

Lambert died, unmarried, at her home at 1 Langton Ridge, Langton Green, Kent, on 11 December 1957, aged 86.
