= Catherine Fulford =

British politician (1881–1960)

Dame Catherine Fulford DBE (1881 – 17 January 1960) was a British politician, who served on London County Council.

Born in Handsworth, near Birmingham, Fulford later moved to London, where she entered local politics in 1921. She served on the Fulham Board of Guardians, and later Fulham Metropolitan Borough Council, then on Chelsea Metropolitan Borough Council. In 1931, she was appointed to London County Council as an alderman, representing the Municipal Reform Party.

From the 1934 London County Council election, she switched to represent Chelsea, then in 1952 she again became an alderman. From 1941 onward, she was the Conservative Party's chief whip on the council.

In 1953, Fulford was made a Dame Commander of the Order of the British Empire "for political and public services in London". She stood down from the council in 1958, and died two years later.
