= Richard Sargood =

British trade unionist and politician

Richard Sargood JP

Member of Parliament for Bermondsey West
- In office 5 July 1945 – 23 February 1950
- Preceded by: Alfred Salter
- Succeeded by: Bob Mellish

Personal details
- Born: 31 July 1888 Lambeth, London, UK
- Died: 27 March 1979 (aged 90)
- Party: Labour
- Spouse: Sarah Deane
- Occupation: Trade union official

Richard Sargood (31 July 1888 – 27 March 1979) was a British trade unionist and Labour Party politician. A long-serving local councillor in London, he sat in the House of Commons from 1945 to 1950.

== Early life and family ==
Sargood was both in Lambeth, to a father also named Richard Sargood. He was educated at a London County Council school.

In January 1919 he married Sarah Deane.

== Career ==
Sargood became a trade union official, and was a councillor on Camberwell Borough Council from 1923 to 1929. He became Justice of the Peace (JP) for London in 1930, and was vice-chairman of the National Joint Council for Fire Services of England and Wales, and vice-chair of the Peckham Labour Party. He was a member of the London County Council from 1934 to 1965, representing Peckham, and served as vice-chair of the council from 1951 to 1952.

== Political career ==
At the 1945 general election, Sargood was elected as the member of parliament (MP) for Bermondsey West, following the retirement due to ill-health of the Labour MP Alfred Salter. When the constituency was abolished in boundary changes for the 1950 general election,

Sargood retired from Parliament.

Parliament of the United Kingdom
Preceded by Alfred Salter	Member of Parliament for Bermondsey West; 1945 – 1950	Constituency abolished
