= Reginald Stamp =

Chairman of the London County Council

Albert Reginald Stamp (7 July 1891 – 6 November 1974) was a British politician who served as the chair of London County Council.

Born on Lavender Hill in Battersea, Stamp's father died while he was a child, and the family endured severe poverty. He worked in a wide variety of jobs before joining the staff of The Gentlewoman newspaper. He worked in its publishing, advertising and editorial departments, before moving into engineering.

During the First World War he was a conscientious objector, an absolutist, and imprisoned from June 1917 to October 1918.

Stamp joined the Independent Labour Party (ILP), and became a close friend of Ramsay MacDonald, serving as his election agent. At the 1923 and 1924 United Kingdom general elections, he stood for the Labour Party in Winchester, taking second place on each occasion, but not coming close to election. He opposed the ILP's disaffiliation from the Labour Party in 1931, and joined Frank Wise's National ILP Affiliation Committee, which soon became part of the Socialist League.

In 1934, Stamp was elected to the London County Council (LCC) representing Bethnal Green South West, and he thereafter devoted most of his time to the body, becoming an alderman, and still later serving as a representative of Islington South West. At the 1945 United Kingdom general election he stood for Stockport, but was again unsuccessful.

On the LCC, Stamp sat on most committees at some time, but he made his greatest impact as chair of the Town Planning Committee; during this period, the council signed many town expansion agreements. In 1963, he was elected as chair of the LCC, but after a few months, leader of the opposition Percy Rugg was passed potentially incriminating letters dating from Stamp's time on the Town Planning Committee. Stamp denied that the letters showed any improper behaviour, but he resigned from the council and retired from politics. The Director of Public Prosecutions conducted an investigation, and concluded that Stamp was innocent of any criminal activity.

Stamp was described by The Observer as a "debonair" figure, and he usually wore a carnation buttonhole.

Civic offices
Preceded by Olive Deer	Chair of London County Council; 1963	Succeeded by Arthur Wicks
