= Bernard Sullivan =

British trade unionist and politician

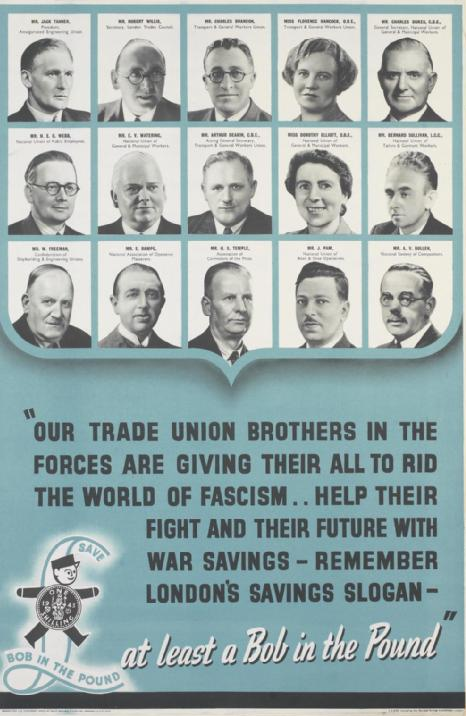
Sullivan (right of middle row) in 1943

Bernard Sullivan (1886 – 1957) was a British trade unionist and politician, who served on London County Council.

Born in Leeds, Sullivan worked as a garment cutter and dress designer. He was an early member of the Labour Representation Committee (LRC), serving as secretary of the New Wortley LRC in 1904/05. He joined a forerunner of the United Garment Workers' Trade Union.

Sullivan served with the West Yorkshire Regiment during World War I, returning to the clothing industry after the war. In 1920, when the National Union of Tailors and Garment Workers was formed, he was appointed as its full-time London District Secretary. He also served on the Shirt, Collar and Tie Wages Council, the Wholesale Tailoring Wages Council, the Made Up Textile Wages Council, and the Regional Board for Industry, and was a member of the London Trades Council.

Initially, Sullivan was seen as one of the more radical figures in the union, a member of the Friends of Soviet Russia, and a supporter of striking workers at Rego in 1928. Unlike the London District Organiser Sam Elsbury, he did not join the United Clothing Workers' Union split. During the Spanish Civil War, he supported the republicans. A founder of the Association of Catholic Trade Unionists, and a leading figure in the Catholic Action movement, and was prominent in arguing the case for Catholic schooling during debates around the Education Act 1944.

Sullivan supported the Labour Party, and was elected to represent Greenwich at the 1937 London County Council election. In 1949/50, he was vice-chairman of the council. He also spent a period as chief whip, and chaired the Public Assistance Committee and Rivers and Mains Committee. He retired in 1952, and died five years later.
