= Freda Corbet =

British politician

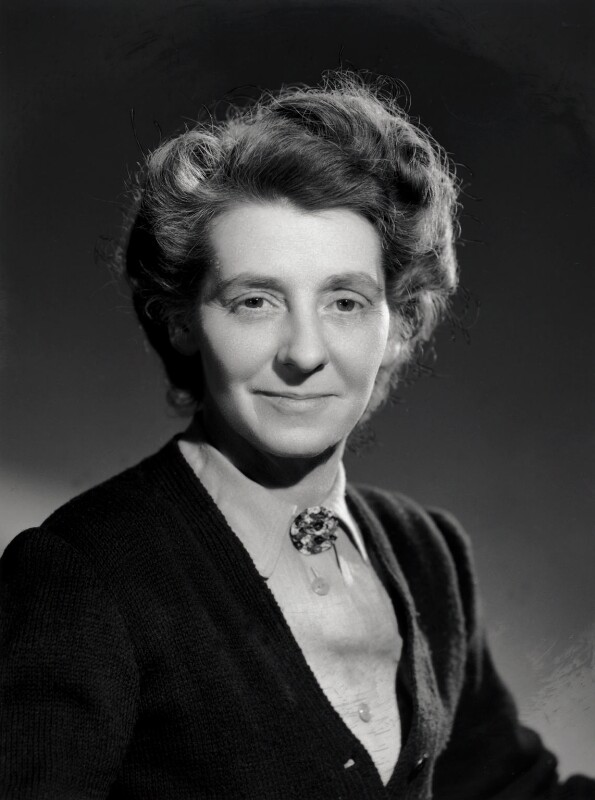
- Corbet in 1947

Member of Parliament for Camberwell North West
- In office 5 July 1945 – 3 February 1950
- Preceded by: Oscar Guest
- Succeeded by: Constituency abolished

Member of Parliament for Peckham
- In office 23 February 1950 – 8 February 1974
- Preceded by: Lewis Silkin
- Succeeded by: Harry Lamborn

Personal details
- Born: Freda Künzlen; 15 November 1900 Tooting, London, England
- Died: 1 November 1993 (aged 92) Bromley, Kent, England
- Party: Labour
- Spouse: Ian McIvor Campbell
- Education: University College London

Freda Corbet (née Künzlen, later Mansell; 15 November 1900 – 1 November 1993) was a British Labour Party politician. Born in London, Corbet spent some time as a teacher in Cornwall before moving back to London to work with her husband in his shop. The couple were both members of the Independent Labour Party and were elected as councillors on London County Council in 1934. There she served on the education committee, helping to introduce comprehensive schools to the city.

Corbet was elected Member of Parliament for Camberwell North West in 1945, though she did not attend many debates, focusing more on her municipal work. She became chief whip of the London County Council in 1947, requiring councillors to check with her before even asking questions at public meetings. Her short stature led to her being known as the 'tiny tyrant'. In 1960, she became chairman of the general services committee, and oversaw the renovation of London's South Bank. Her influential role in the establishment of Royal National Theatre meant that she was given a place on their board for a few years.

She abstained against a three-line whip in 1972, allowing UK to join the European Common Market, and soon after announced her retirement from politics to spend more time with her unwell second husband, Ian McIvor Campbell. Corbet was awarded the Freedom of the Borough of Southwark in 1974.

== Early life ==
Freda Künzlen was born on 15 November 1900, in Tooting in London. She was the eldest child of her father Adolf Künzlen, a commercial clerk and her mother, Nellie, a political activist. Künzlen was educated at Wimbledon County Technical School after winning a scholarship in 1911. During the First World War, the family adopted the name Mansell. She joined the Independent Labour Party in 1919, whilst she was studying at University College London.

Freda Mansell gained a first-class degree in history from University College, and became a teacher in Wales. She then moved to Penzance, Cornwall, where she became mistress at Penzance Church High School for Girls. She married William Corbet, another member of the Independent Labour Party, on 5 August 1925 in Streatham, moving back to London, where her husband ran a sweet shop and newsagent. Whilst working with her husband, she started studying law, and was called to the bar at the Inner Temple in 1932. However, as a woman, she struggled to find employment in the legal field.

== Role as politician ==
In 1927, Herbert Morrison urged her to stand as a candidate for the local council elections, having seen that she was a popular speaker at meetings and hoping to recruit more female candidates. She stood three times before being elected to the council for Camberwell North West in 1934, while her husband was elected to Wandsworth council. From 1949, she represented Peckham on the council, and she remained active until the council was abolished, in 1965. Corbet served on the London County Council's education committee for 16 years, helping to introduce comprehensive schools to the city. She also worked to ensure that council tower blocks included lifts.

Corbet stood for Member of Parliament for Lewisham East for Labour at the 1935 general election, but was unsuccessful. She became a magistrate in 1940, working on the treatment of young offenders. During World War II, Corbet assisted victims of the London blitz in Camberwell, leading to her election as Member of Parliament for Camberwell North West in 1945 and then for Peckham after 1950. Her election in 1945 necessitated the passing of an Act of Parliament to validate her election, as she held office as an assessor under section 6 of the National Service (Armed Forces) Act, 1939 and was therefore incapable of being elected. As a Member of Parliament she did not attend many debates, instead focussing on her local duties, including fortnightly surgeries for her constituents.

Corbet became chief whip for the Labour London County Council in 1947 and was very strict in the role. She was known as the 'tiny tyrant' within the party, due to her height at 4 feet 11 inches (150 cm) and was required to give consent before councillors could publicly dissent or ask questions at public meetings. The role did make her popular, Clement Attlee compared the approach to a totalitarian state. Corbet represented Britain at the United Nations conference in 1948, helping to produce the Universal Declaration of Human Rights.

A replacement chief whip was voted in 1960, and Corbet was appointed chairman of the council's general services committee. There she oversaw the expansion of the South Bank, helping to establish Queen Elizabeth Hall and Purcell Room as well as the Hayward Gallery and the Royal National Theatre. The theatre allowed the city a place on their board, which was held by Corbet between 1962 and 1965. In 1965, when the London County Council was disbanded, replaced with the Greater London Council, Corbet left local government.

== Later life ==
Corbet's husband died in 1957, and Corbet married Ian McIvor Campbell on 8 August 1962. Campbell's husband's health declined, and by 1974 she decided not to seek re-election. Her final action was to abstain on a vote on the European Communities Bill, in defiance of a three-line whip, leading to Britain joining the European Common Market. On 15 November 1974, Freda Campbell was awarded the Freedom of the Borough of Southwark. Ian Campbell died in 1976, and Freda died of bronchopneumonia and heart failure in Bromley, Kent on 1 November 1993.

Parliament of the United Kingdom
Preceded by Oscar Guest	Member of Parliament for Camberwell North West; 1945 – 1950	Constituency abolished
Preceded by Lewis Silkin	Member of Parliament for Peckham; 1950 – February 1974	Succeeded by Harry Lamborn
