= Peggy Jay =

English Labour politician

Margaret Christian Jay, Baroness Jay (née Garnett; 4 January 1913 – 21 January 2008) was an English Labour member of London County Council and the Greater London Council between 1934, when she was still in her twenties, and 1967. She then chaired the Heath and Old Hampstead Society from 1967 to 1989. In 1981 she joined the Social Democratic Party, but in 2007 returned to Labour.

== Early life ==
The daughter of James Clerk Maxwell Garnett, a barrister, and his wife Margaret Lucy Poulton, daughter of Sir Edward Bagnall Poulton, her parents lived in Gainsborough Gardens, Hampstead, and the young Garnett was educated at St Paul's Girls' School, Hammersmith, where she befriended Shiela Grant Duff. She studied economics at Somerville College, Oxford, from 1931 to 1933, when she married Douglas Jay, who had tutored her in preparation for her University of Oxford entrance exams.

== Career ==
Joining the Labour Party, in 1934 Margaret Jay was recruited by Herbert Morrison as a candidate for the London County Council (LCC), and she was its youngest member when elected at a by-election in Hackney South in 1938, shortly before Labour gained control. She represented Hackney South, then later Battersea South, in her husband's parliamentary constituency, and finally Battersea North, until 1964, when she was elected to the new Greater London Council before losing her Wandsworth seat at the 1967 election. Labour narrowly regained Wandsworth in 1970, but Jay did not stand again. She remained involved in local affairs, chairing the Heath and Old Hampstead Society from 1967 to 1989, and was president from 1993 to 2004. She described this work as "the most worthwhile and satisfying in my life." On her death, Jay was described by a local newspaper as the "uncrowned queen of Hampstead".

She was a member of the Royal Commission on Population from 1944 to 1949, through which she knew Eva Hubback. The historian, Brian Harrison, interviewed Jay, primarily about Hubback, in January 1977 as part the Suffrage Interviews project, titled Oral evidence on the suffragette and suffragist movements: the Brian Harrison interviews.

She left the Labour Party in 1981 for the newly formed Social Democratic Party, rejoining only after Gordon Brown became prime minister. She was the last survivor of the "Hampstead middle-class Labour grandes dames" whom Morrison had groomed to take over the LCC.

== Family ==
She married politician Douglas Jay in 1933, aged 20. They had four children, but the marriage ended in divorce. A son, Peter Jay, was a journalist, leading economist and a former British Ambassador to the United States. Peter Jay was married to Margaret Callaghan, the daughter of Prime Minister Jim Callaghan. Their twin daughters, Helen and Catherine, achieved a fashionable profile in the 1960s. At one time her son-in-law, married to Helen, was Rupert Pennant-Rea, a former deputy Governor of the Bank of England.

Her niece is Virginia Bottomley, a Conservative politician. Her nephew is Lord Hunt of Chesterton, and her great-nephew is Tristram Hunt, former Member of Parliament for Stoke-on-Trent Central and Shadow Secretary of State for Education, and now Director of the Victoria and Albert Museum.
