= 1952 London County Council election =

1952 local election in England

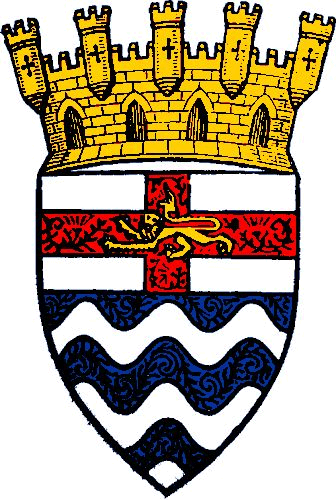
- 3 April 1952
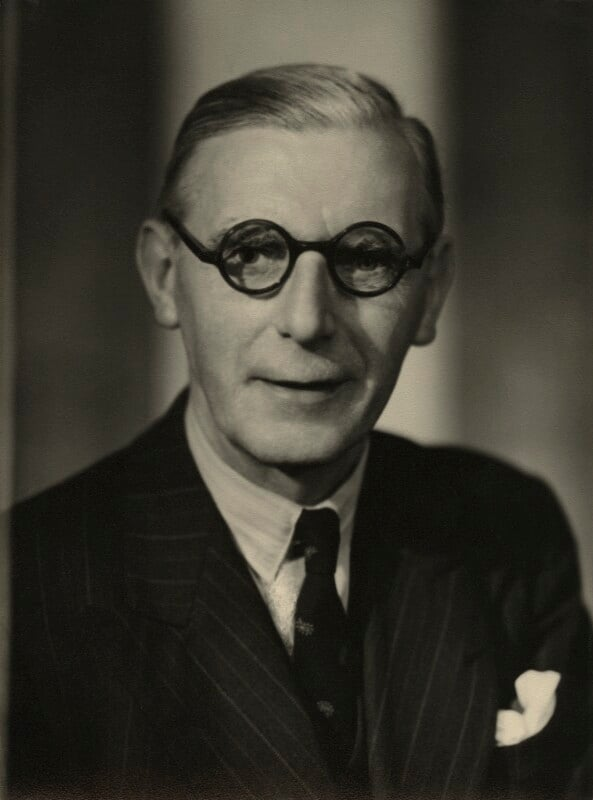

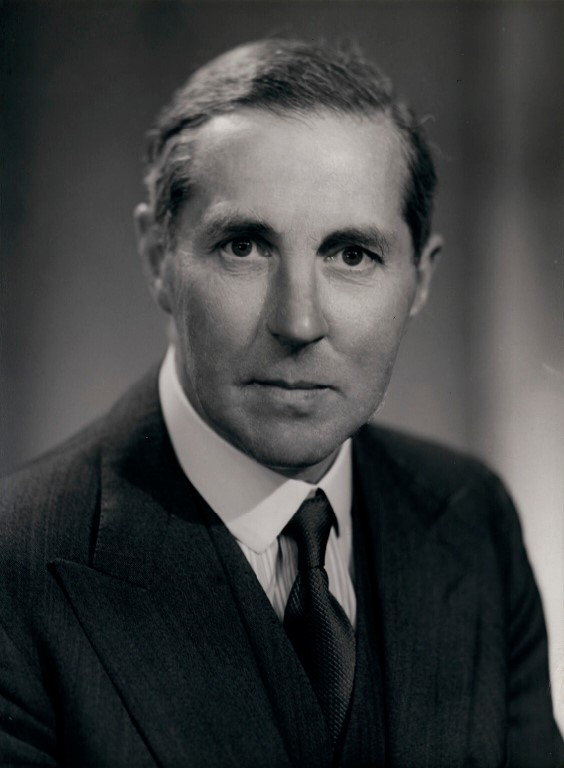
	First party	Second party
Leader	Isaac Hayward	Henry Brooke
Party	Labour	Conservative
Leader since	1947	1946
Leader's seat	Deptford	Cities of London and Westminster
Seats won	92	37
Seat change	▲27	▼26
Popular vote	1,684,387	1,344,328
Percentage	55.0%	43.9%
Swing	▲8.1%	▼7.0%

An election to the County Council of London took place on 3 April 1952. The council was elected by First Past the Post with each elector having three votes in the three-member seats. The Labour Party made substantial gains and greatly increased its majority.

== Campaign ==
The Labour Party manifesto proposed increased slum clearance, new comprehensive schools, and new construction at the South Bank. It targeted Conservative seats in Fulham East, Hammersmith South, Kensington North and Paddington North.

The Conservative Party hoped to make a small number of gains and take control of the council. It targeted Labour-held seats in Brixton, Fulham West, Islington North and St Pancras North. Its manifesto proposed working more closely with the government in building housing, closing civic restaurants, and halting the construction of comprehensive schools.

The Liberal Party stood only twelve candidates, and hoped to retain its representation in Bethnal Green. The Conservatives stood only two candidates in the constituency, and suggested that its supporters voted for the Liberal candidate Nicholas Harris, son of retiring Liberal councillor Percy Harris.

== Results ==
Labour won a significant majority in the election, gaining 27 seats, and increasing their vote share in almost every constituency. The Conservatives had for some years received higher vote shares in council elections than at general elections, but this pattern was reversed. The party was particularly surprised to lose a seat in Holborn and St Pancras South, which had a large business vote.

The Liberal Party lost its only seat on the council, and saw its vote share in Bethnal Green fall to less than half its previous level, although it did still beat the Conservative Party in the constituency. The Communist Party also saw its vote drop severely, although it was able to beat the Conservative Party in its best constituency of Stepney.

Turnout in the election was up from 1949, with 41% of possible votes cast. A record number of women were elected, comprising nearly one-third of the total number of members of the council.

Party	Vote	%	Standing	Seats Won	Seat %
Labour	1,684,387	55.0	129	92	
Conservative	1,344,328	43.9	128	37	
Liberal	19,723	0.6	12	0	0.0
Communist	11,131	0.4	9	0	0.0
Union Movement	3,074	0.1	6	0	0.0
Independent	1,672	0.1	2	0	0.0
