= Hackney South (London County Council constituency) =

London County Council constituency

- Former constituency for the London County Council

Former constituency
- Created: 1889
- Abolished: 1955
- Member(s): 2 (to 1949); 3 (from 1949)
- Replaced by: Bethnal Green and Hackney Central

Hackney South was a constituency used for elections to the London County Council between 1889 and 1955. The seat shared boundaries with the UK Parliament constituency of the same name. The seat largely became Hackney Central, with part moved into Bethnal Green.

== Councillors ==
Year	Name	Party	Name	Party	Name	Party
1889	George Bethell Holmes	Progressive	John Jones	Progressive	Two seats until 1949	
1892	George Bethell Holmes	Progressive	James Bannerman	Progressive	Two seats until 1949	
1895	Arthur Humphrey	Labour Progressive	Alfred Smith	Progressive	Two seats until 1949	
1898	Edmond Browne	Progressive	Alfred Smith	Progressive	Two seats until 1949	
1907	William Augustus Casson	Progressive	Theodore Chapman	Progressive	Two seats until 1949	
1913	George King Naylor	Progressive	Theodore Chapman	Progressive	Two seats until 1949	
1916	Charles Winkley	Progressive	Theodore Chapman	Progressive	Two seats until 1949	
1919	John James McClelland	Progressive	Theodore Chapman	Progressive	Two seats until 1949	
1922	Herbert Grant	Progressive	Theodore Chapman	Progressive	Two seats until 1949	
1925	Alfred Baker	Labour	Ada Salter	Labour	Two seats until 1949	
1928	Alfred Baker	Labour	Marshall Jackman	Labour	Two seats until 1949	
1934	Alfred Baker	Labour	Charles Latham	Labour	Two seats until 1949	
1943	Giles Charles Burton	Labour	Charles Latham	Labour	Two seats until 1949	
1946	Giles Charles Burton	Labour	William Nichols	Labour	Two seats until 1949	
1949	Reginald Day	Labour	Bernard Homa	Labour	Peggy Jay	Labour
1952	Hilary Halpin	Labour	Bernard Homa	Labour	Mary Ormerod	Labour

== Election results ==
1889 London County Council election: Hackney South
Party	Candidate	Votes	%	±%
Progressive	John Jones	2,071		
Progressive	George Bethell Holmes	1,968		
Moderate	John Lobb	1,863		
Moderate	Thomas Jackson	1,786		
Progressive win (new seat)				
Progressive win (new seat)				

1892 London County Council election: Hackney South
Party	Candidate	Votes	%	±%
Progressive	George Bethell Holmes	2,795		
Progressive	James Bannerman	2,730		
Moderate	Frederick James Reilly	1,973		
Moderate	Lewis Edmunds	1,897		
Progressive hold		Swing		
Progressive hold		Swing		

1895 London County Council election: Hackney South
Party	Candidate	Votes	%	±%
Labour Progressive	Arthur Humphrey	3,315		
Progressive	Alfred Smith	3,241		
Moderate	John Lobb	2,689		
Moderate	John Hely-Hutchinson	2,424		
Independent	C. Steel	89		
Progressive hold		Swing		
Progressive hold		Swing		

1898 London County Council election: Hackney South
Party	Candidate	Votes	%	±%
Progressive	Alfred Smith	3,360		
Progressive	Edmond Browne	3,174		
Moderate	C. Steel	2,484		
Moderate	Frederick Briscoe Oldfield	2,452		
Ind. Labour Party	Ramsay Macdonald	379		
Progressive hold		Swing		
Progressive hold		Swing		

1901 London County Council election: Hackney South
Party	Candidate	Votes	%	±%
Progressive	Edmond Browne	4,231	33.6	+5.9
Progressive	Alfred Smith	4,169	33.1	+3.8
Conservative	Maurice Edmund Arnold Wallis	2,117	16.8	−4.9
Conservative	Frederick Briscoe Oldfield	2,068	16.4	−5.0
Progressive hold		Swing		
Progressive hold		Swing	+4.9	

1904 London County Council election: Hackney South
Party	Candidate	Votes	%	±%
Progressive	Edmond Browne	4,318		
Progressive	Alfred Smith	4,316		
Municipal Reform	Stanley Boulter	1,776		
Municipal Reform	R. M. Craig	1,767		
Majority				
Progressive hold		Swing		
Progressive hold		Swing		

1907 London County Council election: Hackney South
Party	Candidate	Votes	%	±%
Progressive	Theodore Chapman	5,225		
Progressive	William Augustus Casson	5,138		
Municipal Reform	C. Winkley	3,325		
Municipal Reform	G. Naylor	3,285		
Majority				
Progressive hold		Swing		
Progressive hold		Swing	{{{swing}}}	

1910 London County Council election: Hackney South
Party	Candidate	Votes	%	±%
Progressive	Theodore Chapman	4,947	32.0	
Progressive	William Augustus Casson	4,867	31.5	
Municipal Reform	William Deedes	2,830	18.3	
Municipal Reform	Master of Saltoun	2,809	18.2	
Majority				
Progressive hold		Swing		
Progressive hold		Swing		

1913 London County Council election: Hackney South
Party	Candidate	Votes	%	±%
Municipal Reform	George King Naylor	3,132	25.5	+7.2
Progressive	Theodore Chapman	3,109	25.3	−6.7
Municipal Reform	James Ernest Brudenell-Bruce	3,059	24.9	+6.7
Progressive	C. Watson	2,981	24.3	−7.2
Majority		50	0.4	−12.8
Municipal Reform gain from Progressive		Swing	+7.2	
Progressive hold		Swing	+6.7	

1919 London County Council election: Hackney South
Party	Candidate	Votes	%	±%
Progressive	Theodore Chapman	Unopposed	n/a	n/a
Progressive	John James McClelland	Unopposed	n/a	n/a
Progressive hold		Swing	n/a	
Progressive gain from Municipal Reform		Swing	n/a	

1922 London County Council election: Hackney South
Party	Candidate	Votes	%	±%
Progressive	Theodore Chapman	4,588	32.0	n/a
Progressive	H. O. Grant	4,416	30.8	n/a
Labour	E. Wigan	2,669	18.6	n/a
Labour	Emma Boyce	2,662	18.6	n/a
Majority		1,747	12.2	n/a
Progressive hold		Swing	n/a	
Progressive hold		Swing	n/a	

1925 London County Council election: Hackney South
Party	Candidate	Votes	%	±%
Labour	Ada Salter	4,869		
Labour	Alfred Baker	4,811		
Progressive	G. J. Holmes	4,494		
Municipal Reform	R. M. Dix	4,425		n/a
Majority				
Labour gain from Progressive		Swing		
Labour gain from Progressive		Swing		

1928 London County Council election: Hackney South
Party	Candidate	Votes	%	±%
Labour	Alfred Baker	5,190		
Labour	Marshall Jackman	5,158		
Municipal Reform	Gladys Cecil	3,513		
Municipal Reform	C. H. Moore	3,432		
Liberal	V. Mathews	2,390		
Liberal	Joseph James Davies	2,351		
Independent Labour	Wal Hannington	676		
Independent Labour	G. Lee	650		
Majority				
Labour hold		Swing		
Labour hold		Swing		

1931 London County Council election: Hackney South
Party	Candidate	Votes	%	±%
Labour	Marshall Jackman	4,682		
Labour	Alfred Baker	4,628		
Anti-Socialist	A. E. Smith	4,119		
Anti-Socialist	A. H. Molson	4,115		
Communist	A. V. Leicht	158		
Communist	A. Massic	151		
Majority				
Labour hold		Swing		
Labour hold		Swing		

1934 London County Council election: Hackney South
Party	Candidate	Votes	%	±%
Labour	Charles Latham	7,678		
Labour	Alfred Baker	7,662		
Municipal Reform	A. E. Smith	3,953		
Municipal Reform	G. Gardiner	3,873		
Majority				
Labour hold		Swing		
Labour hold		Swing		

1937 London County Council election: Hackney South
Party	Candidate	Votes	%	±%
Labour	Alfred Baker	9,102		
Labour	Charles Latham	9,051		
Municipal Reform	A. Ackerman	4,580		
Municipal Reform	H. P. M. Bower	4,538		
Majority				
Labour hold		Swing		
Labour hold		Swing		

1946 London County Council election: Hackney South
Party	Candidate	Votes	%	±%
Labour	Giles Charles Burton	4,687		
Labour	William Nichols	4,602		
Conservative	A. H. Davey	1,576		
Conservative	E. T. Smith	1,447		
Majority				
Labour hold		Swing		
Labour hold		Swing		

1949 London County Council election: Hackney South
Party	Candidate	Votes	%	±%
Labour	Bernard Homa	14,251		
Labour	Peggy Jay	13,892		
Labour	Reginald Day	13,206		
Conservative	J. Milbourne	9,775		
Conservative	Montague Moustardier	9,748		
Conservative	J. A. Pritchard	9,627		
Communist	Solly Kaye	3,955		
Communist	Bob Darke	3,227		
Communist	Morrie Blaston	3,030		
Labour hold		Swing		
Labour hold		Swing		
Labour hold		Swing		

1952 London County Council election: Hackney South
Party	Candidate	Votes	%	±%
Labour	Bernard Homa	17,014		
Labour	Hilary Halpin	16,239		
Labour	Mary Ormerod	15,193		
Conservative	R. P. Hornby	6,482		
Conservative	J. W. Milbourne	5,956		
Conservative	H. C. Coulter	5,681		
Communist	Solly Kaye	1,373		
Communist	Morrie Blaston	1,303		
Communist	John Betteridge	1,234		
Labour hold		Swing		
Labour hold		Swing		
Labour hold		Swing		
