= Kitty Colyer =

British music hall performer and politician (1881–1972)

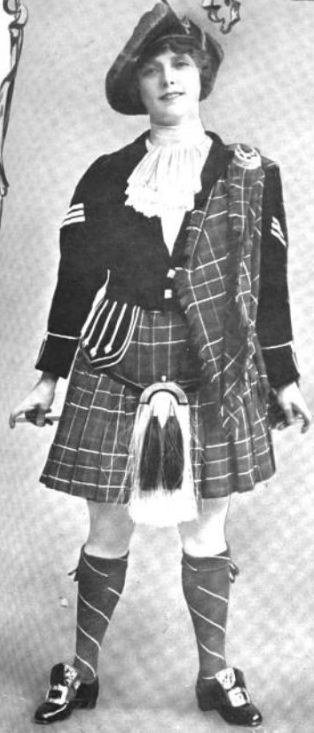
- In the Illustrated Sporting and Dramatic News (1917)
- Born: Katherine Amelia Rea; 9 October 1881; Wandsworth, London, England
- Died: 4 March 1972 (aged 90); Worthing, Sussex, England
- Occupations: Music hall performer and local politician

Katherine Amelia Day (9 October 1881 – 4 March 1972) was a British music hall performer and politician.

Born Katherine Amelia Rea on 9 October 1881 in the Wandsworth district of London, she adopted the stage name Kitty Colyer, and performed widely, alongside Vesta Tilley and May Beatty. She frequently performed at the Bedford Theatre in Camden Town which was owned by Harry Day, and the two married in 1901.

Bothy Kitty and Harry joined the Labour Party, and in 1927, Kitty was invited to stand for the party in one of the St Pancras seats. She turned down the offer, but retired at the end of her run of shows to stand in the 1928 London County Council election in Southwark Central. She won the seat, but served only a single three-year term before standing down, in favour of Harry. He died in 1939, and in 1947 Kitty married John Latham.

Kitty died on 4 March 1972 in Worthing, Sussex aged ninety.
