= Southwark Central (London County Council constituency) =

London County Council constituency

- Former constituency for the London County Council

Former constituency
- Created: 1919
- Abolished: 1949
- Member: 2
- Created from: Newington West
- Replaced by: Southwark

Southwark Central was a London County Council constituency used for elections between 1919 and 1949. The constituency elected two members per electoral cycle and shared boundaries with the UK Parliament constituency of the same name. It was abolished in 1949 and replaced by the enlarged Southwark constituency.

== Councillors ==
Year	Name	Party	Name	Party
1919	George Henry Cook	Progressive	James Daniel Gilbert	Progressive
1928	David Arlott	Labour	Kitty Colyer	Labour
1931	David Arlott	Labour	Harry Day	Labour
1939	David Arlott	Labour	Ernest George Saunders	Labour
1946	Albert Gates	Labour	John Keen	Labour

== Election results ==
1919 London County Council election: Southwark Central
Party	Candidate	Votes	%	±%
Progressive	James Daniel Gilbert	Unopposed	n/a	n/a
Progressive	George Henry Cook	Unopposed	n/a	n/a
Progressive hold		Swing	n/a	
Progressive hold		Swing	n/a	

1922 London County Council election: Southwark Central
Party	Candidate	Votes	%	±%
Progressive	James Daniel Gilbert	6,374	35.9	n/a
Progressive	George Henry Cook	6,154	34.7	n/a
Labour	Lewis Silkin	2,618	14.7	n/a
Labour	W. Barrett	2,611	14.7	n/a
Majority		3,536	20.0	n/a
Progressive hold		Swing	n/a	
Progressive hold		Swing	n/a	

1925 London County Council election: Southwark Central
Party	Candidate	Votes	%	±%
Progressive	James Daniel Gilbert	5,198		
Progressive	George Henry Cook	4,810		
Labour	Alfred George Prichard	3,189		
Labour	F. Roberts	3,148		
Majority				
Progressive hold		Swing		
Progressive hold		Swing		

1928 London County Council election: Southwark Central
Party	Candidate	Votes	%	±%
Labour	Kitty Colyer	5,391		
Labour	David Arlott	4,852		
Liberal	James Daniel Gilbert	4,796		
Liberal	George Henry Cook	4,534		
Municipal Reform	C. B. Salmon	1,823		
Municipal Reform	Irene Dowling	1,814		
Majority				
Labour gain from Progressive		Swing		
Labour gain from Progressive		Swing		

1931 London County Council election: Southwark Central
Party	Candidate	Votes	%	±%
Labour	Harry Day	3,325		
Labour	David Arlott	3,037		
Anti-Socialist	J. M. Oakey	2,548		
Anti-Socialist	F. Williams	2,358		
Independent	P. McCarthy	1,973		
Organised Unemployed	J. Fitzgerald	123		
Organised Unemployed	W. Newton	111		
Majority				
Labour hold		Swing		
Labour hold		Swing		

1934 London County Council election: Southwark Central
Party	Candidate	Votes	%	±%
Labour	Harry Day	5,309		
Labour	David Arlott	4,760		
Liberal	P. McCarthy	2,410		
Liberal	James Robert Want	2,225		
Municipal Reform	Hugh Gough	1,611		
Municipal Reform	A. Mash	1,502		
Majority				
Labour hold		Swing		
Labour hold		Swing		

1937 London County Council election: Southwark Central
Party	Candidate	Votes	%	±%
Labour	Harry Day	6,291		
Labour	David Arlott	5,628		
Municipal Progressive	James Robert Want	3,517		
Municipal Progressive	F. A. Stockdale	3,476		
Majority				
Labour hold		Swing		
Labour hold		Swing		

1946 London County Council election: Southwark Central
Party	Candidate	Votes	%	±%
Labour	Albert Gates	3,745		
Labour	John Keen	3,653		
Conservative	V. S. White	777		
Conservative	A. E. Lloyd	763		
Majority				
Labour hold		Swing		
Labour hold		Swing		
