= Finsbury (London County Council constituency) =

London County Council constituency

- Former constituency for the London County Council

Former constituency
- Created: 1919
- Abolished: 1949
- Member(s): 2
- Created from: Finsbury Central and Finsbury East
- Replaced by: Shoreditch and Finsbury

Finsbury was a constituency used for elections to the London County Council between 1919 and 1949. The seat shared boundaries with the UK Parliament constituency of the same name.

== Councillors ==
Year	Name	Party	Name	Party
1919	Alfred Baker	Progressive	George Gillett	Progressive
1922	Otho Nicholson	Municipal Reform	Rachel Mary Parsons	Municipal Reform
1925	James Duncan	Municipal Reform	Ernest Taylor	Municipal Reform
1928	William Harry Martin	Labour	Charles Robert Simpson	Labour
1934	William Harry Martin	Labour	George Edward Hayes	Labour
1946	Barbara Marian Dobb	Labour	Chuni Lal Katial	Labour

== Election results ==
1919 London County Council election: Finsbury
Party	Candidate	Votes	%	±%
Progressive	George Gillett	2,897	29.9	
Progressive	Alfred Baker	2,569	26.5	
Municipal Reform	Henry Baldwin Barton	2,146	22.2	
Municipal Reform	James Little	2,073	21.4	
Majority		423	4.3	
Progressive hold		Swing		
Progressive hold		Swing		

1922 London County Council election: Finsbury
Party	Candidate	Votes	%	±%
Municipal Reform	Otho Nicholson	5,778	25.7	+3.5
Municipal Reform	Rachel Mary Parsons	5,636	25.1	+3.7
Labour	C. H. Brew	3,222	14.3	n/a
Labour	Charles Simpson	3,109	13.8	n/a
Progressive	Alfred Baker	2,464	11.0	−18.9
Progressive	Ida Samuel	2,253	10.0	−16.5
Majority		2,414	10.8	
Municipal Reform gain from Progressive		Swing		
Municipal Reform hold		Swing		

1925 London County Council election: Finsbury
Party	Candidate	Votes	%	±%
Municipal Reform	Ernest Taylor	5,318		
Municipal Reform	James Duncan	4,981		
Labour	Charles Simpson	4,860		
Labour	William Harry Martin	4,844		
Majority				
Municipal Reform hold		Swing		
Municipal Reform hold		Swing		

1928 London County Council election: Finsbury
Party	Candidate	Votes	%	±%
Labour	William Harry Martin	7,212		
Labour	Charles Simpson	7,207		
Municipal Reform	Alexander Henry Melvill Wedderburn	4,365		
Municipal Reform	Alfred P. Harrison	4,332		
Majority				
Labour gain from Municipal Reform		Swing		
Labour gain from Municipal Reform		Swing		

1931 London County Council election: Finsbury
Party	Candidate	Votes	%	±%
Labour	Charles Simpson	5,866		
Labour	William Harry Martin	5,863		
Municipal Reform	J. M. Naylor	4,259		
Municipal Reform	K. W. M. Green	4,220		
Majority				
Labour hold		Swing		
Labour hold		Swing		

1934 London County Council election: Finsbury
Party	Candidate	Votes	%	±%
Labour	William Harry Martin	7,409		
Labour	George Edward Hayes	7,383		
National Municipal	M. Franklin	3,226		
National Municipal	Fordham Flower	3,213		
Majority				
Labour hold		Swing		
Labour hold		Swing		

1937 London County Council election: Finsbury
Party	Candidate	Votes	%	±%
Labour	William Harry Martin	7,968		
Labour	George Edward Hayes	7,896		
Municipal Reform	G. H. Fletcher	3,835		
Municipal Reform	F. F. A. Burden	3,775		
Majority				
Labour hold		Swing		
Labour hold		Swing		

1946 London County Council election: Finsbury
Party	Candidate	Votes	%	±%
Labour	Barbara Marian Dobb	3,044		
Labour	Chuni Lal Katial	2,931		
Conservative	A. G. Webb	1,727		
Conservative	C. R. Purnell	1,719		
Communist	Kay Beauchamp	1,167		
Communist	Ann C. Murray	1,067		
Majority				
Labour hold		Swing		
Labour hold		Swing		
