= 1919 London County Council election =

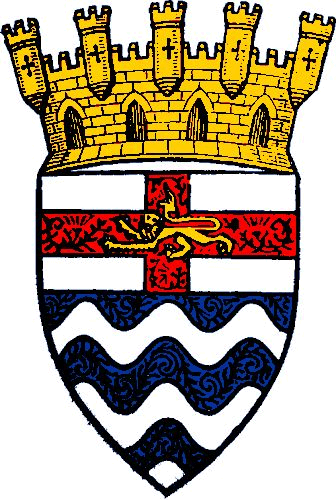
- 6 March 1919

124 Council Seats 63 seats needed for a majority

| | First party | Second party | Third party |
|---|---|---|---|
| Leader | George Hume | Scott Lidgett | Harry Gosling |
| Party | Municipal Reform | Progressive | Labour |
| Leader since | 1918 | 1918 | 1920 |
| Last election | 67 seats | 49 seats | 2 seats |
| Seats won | 68 | 40 | 15 |
| Seat change | ▲1 | ▼9 | ▲13 |
| Popular vote | 59,021 | 39,015 | 54,053 |
| Percentage | 36.8% | 24.3% | 33.7% |

An election to the County Council of London took place on 6 March 1919. It was the tenth triennial election of the whole Council. The size of the council was increased to 124 councillors and 20 aldermen. The councillors were elected for electoral divisions corresponding to the new parliamentary constituencies that had been created by the Representation of the People Act 1918. There were 60 dual-member constituencies and one four-member constituency. The council was elected by First Past the Post, with each elector having two votes in the dual-member seats.

== National government background ==
The prime minister of the day was the Liberal David Lloyd George. who had just led a Coalition Government that included the Unionist Party and some Liberals and Socialists to a general election victory three months earlier, with the help of a Coalition government 'coupon'.

== London Council background ==
Although the Municipal Reform Party had won an overall majority at the last elections in 1913, in line with national politics, they decided late in 1917 to form a war-time coalition to mirror the national government. Some Progressive Party members were offered chairmanships of committees. This coalition had continued after the war ended.

== Candidates ==
There was no County wide electoral agreements between any of the parties, though clearly there had been some locally agreed situations. There were very few constituencies where all three parties stood two candidates. In the past, the Progressive Party had encompassed the Labour Party, with candidates running in harness. That situation was becoming less common. A few Progressive candidates ran in harness with Municipal Reform candidates but there was no 'coupon' in operation for the two 'coalition parties' who frequently ran candidates against each other. Among the defeated candidates were future Labour Leader Clement Attlee and future Conservative Chief Whip David Margesson

== Outcome ==
The Municipal Reform Party won an overall majority of seats, electing 68 councillors. They only lost one seat, to an independent candidate. (The defeated candidate was made an Alderman after the election) As before they decided to operate a form of Coalition with the Progressives. Labour made a substantial advance in terms of seats, but remained the third party. There was just one Independent elected.

== Constituency results ==
=== Battersea ===
- Incumbent Councillors shown in bold.

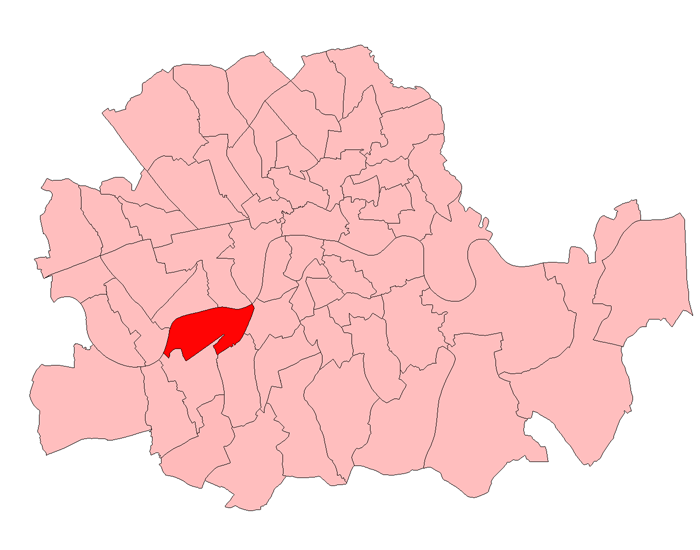
Battersea North

London County Council election, 1919: Battersea North
| Party | Candidate | Votes | % | ±% |
|---|---|---|---|---|
| Labour | Joseph George Butler | 2,635 | 28.7 | |
| Labour | Alfred Augustus Watts | 2,518 | 27.4 | |
| Municipal Reform | William Watts | 2,019 | 22.0 | |
| Municipal Reform | G. L. B. Rees | 2,003 | 21.8 | |
| Majority | | 499 | 5.4 | |
| Labour **hold** | | Swing | | |
| Labour **hold** | | Swing | | |

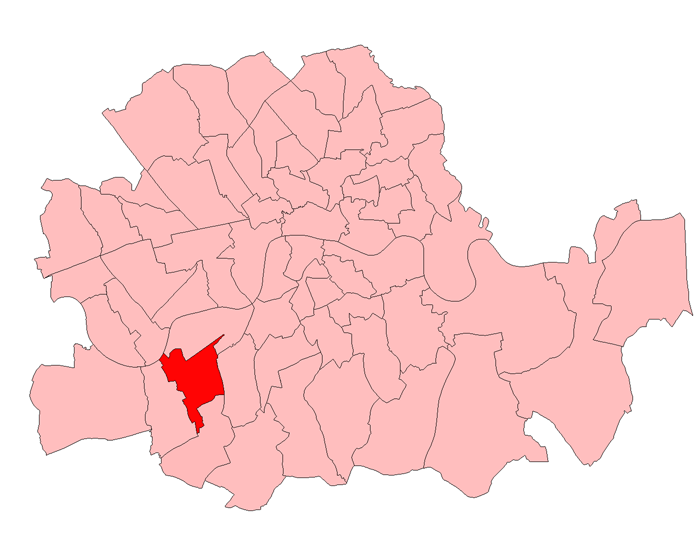
Battersea South

London County Council election, 1919: Battersea South
| Party | Candidate | Votes | % | ±% |
|---|---|---|---|---|
| Municipal Reform | **Edwin Evans** | 3,836 | 26.3 | |
| Municipal Reform | William Hammond | 3,683 | 25.2 | |
| Progressive | **William J. West** | 1,978 | 13.5 | |
| Progressive | **Walter Richard Warren** | 1,975 | 13.5 | |
| Labour | Caroline Selina Ganley | 1,603 | 11.0 | |
| Labour | C. Reed | 1,523 | 10.4 | |
| Majority | | 1,705 | 11.7 | |
| Municipal Reform **gain** from Progressive | | Swing | | |
| Municipal Reform **gain** from Progressive | | Swing | | |

=== Bermondsey ===
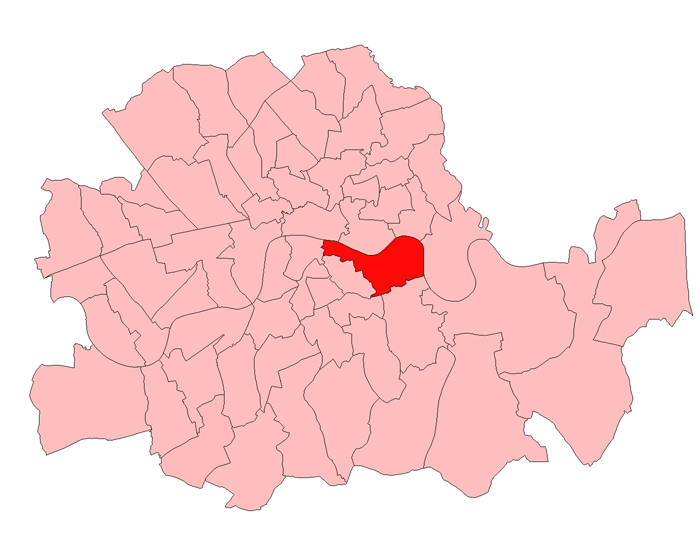
Rotherhithe

London County Council election, 1919: Rotherhithe
| Party | Candidate | Votes | % | ±% |
|---|---|---|---|---|
| Progressive | **Dr. John Scott Lidgett** | 2,327 | 36.3 | |
| Progressive | **Robert Leishman Stuart** | 2,252 | 35.2 | |
| Labour | Ada Salter | 988 | 15.4 | |
| Labour | John Thomas Westcott | 839 | 13.1 | |
| Majority | | 1,264 | 19.8 | |
| Progressive **hold** | | Swing | | |
| Progressive **hold** | | Swing | | |

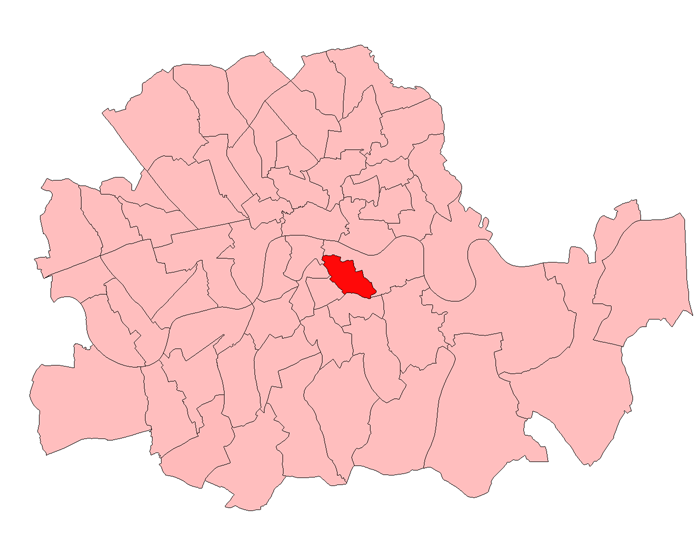
Bermondsey West

London County Council election, 1919: Bermondsey West
| Party | Candidate | Votes | % | ±% |
|---|---|---|---|---|
| Progressive | **Harold James Glanville** | 2,214 | 28.5 | |
| Progressive | **Montague Shearman** | 1,619 | 20.9 | |
| Labour | Dr. Alfred Salter | 1,464 | 18.9 | |
| Independent | William Shearring | 1,420 | 18.3 | |
| Labour | Charles William Gibson | 1,046 | 13.5 | |
| Majority | | 155 | 2.0 | |
| Progressive **hold** | | Swing | | |
| Progressive **hold** | | Swing | | |

=== Bethnal Green ===
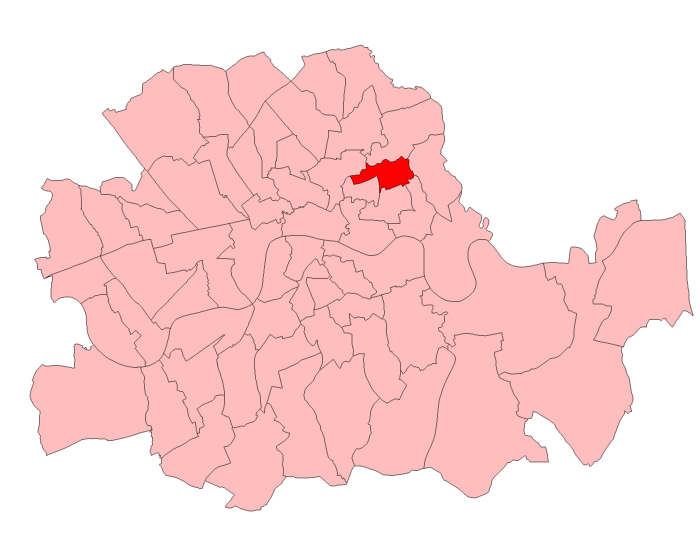
Bethnal Green N E

London County Council election, 1919: Bethnal Green North East
| Party | Candidate | Votes | % | ±% |
|---|---|---|---|---|
| Progressive | **Sir Edward Smith** | Unopposed | n/a | n/a |
| Progressive | Garnham Edmonds | Unopposed | n/a | n/a |
| Progressive **hold** | | Swing | n/a | |
| Progressive **hold** | | Swing | n/a | |

Headlam

London County Council election, 1919: Bethnal Green South West
| Party | Candidate | Votes | % | ±% |
|---|---|---|---|---|
| Progressive | **Rev. Stewart Duckworth Headlam** | 1,599 | 42.0 | |
| Progressive | **Percy Alfred Harris** | 1,446 | 38.0 | |
| Labour | Joseph James Vaughan | 393 | 10.3 | |
| Labour | H. Fitt | 371 | 9.7 | |
| Majority | | 1,053 | 27.7 | |
| Progressive **hold** | | Swing | | |
| Progressive **hold** | | Swing | | |

=== Camberwell ===
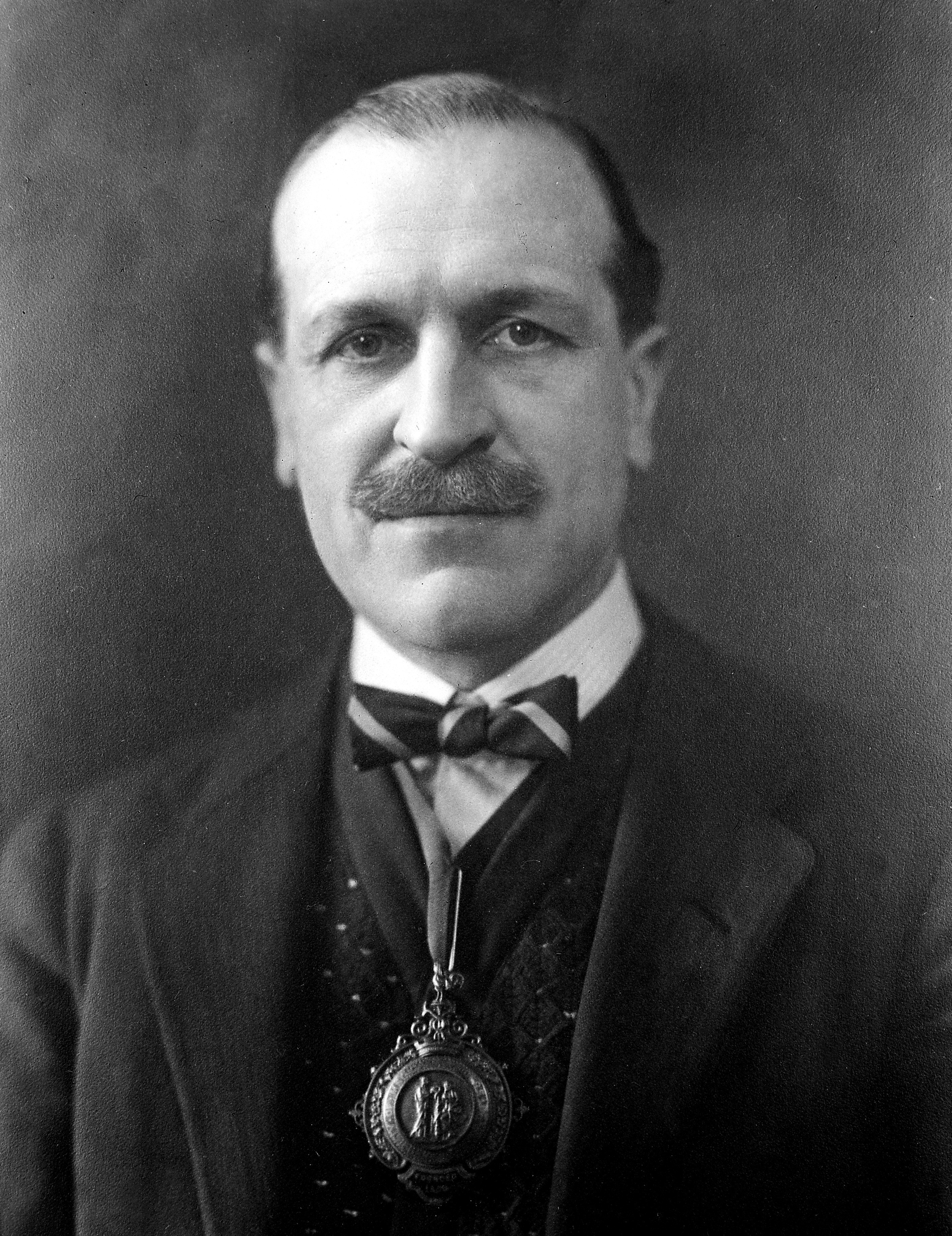
Fremantle

London County Council election, 1919: Dulwich
| Party | Candidate | Votes | % | ±% |
|---|---|---|---|---|
| Municipal Reform | **Henry Cubitt Gooch** | Unopposed | n/a | n/a |
| Municipal Reform | Francis Edward Fremantle | Unopposed | n/a | n/a |
| Municipal Reform **hold** | | Swing | n/a | |
| Municipal Reform **hold** | | Swing | n/a | |

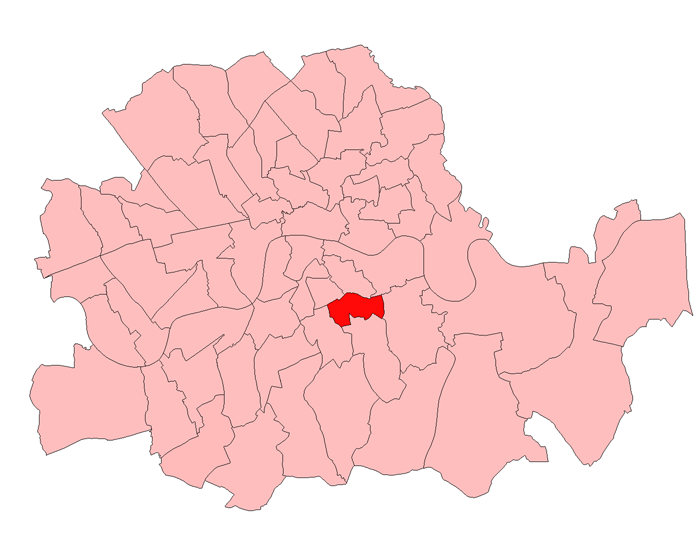
Camberwell North

London County Council election, 1919: Camberwell North
| Party | Candidate | Votes | % | ±% |
|---|---|---|---|---|
| Labour | Charles George Ammon | 1,450 | 34.5 | n/a |
| Progressive | Herbert Arthur Baker | 1,021 | 24.3 | −3.9 |
| Municipal Reform | Henry Joseph Raiment | 932 | 22.2 | −0.1 |
| Municipal Reform | Arthur Charles Fox-Davies | 802 | 19.1 | −2.7 |
| Majority | | 89 | 2.1 | −3.9 |
| Progressive **hold** | | Swing | | |
| Labour **gain** from Progressive | | Swing | | |

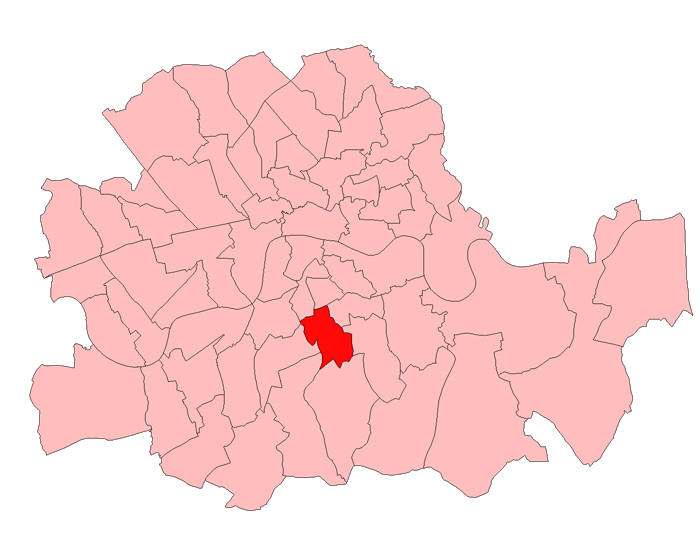
Camberwell North West

London County Council election, 1919: Camberwell North-West
| Party | Candidate | Votes | % | ±% |
|---|---|---|---|---|
| Progressive | Henry Ernest Wood | 1,534 | 27.8 | n/a |
| Progressive | Seth Coward | 1,503 | 27.3 | n/a |
| Municipal Reform | Rose Dunn-Gardner | 1,255 | 22.8 | n/a |
| Municipal Reform | J M Fraser | 1,222 | 22.2 | n/a |
| Majority | | 248 | 4.5 | n/a |
| Progressive **win** | | | | |

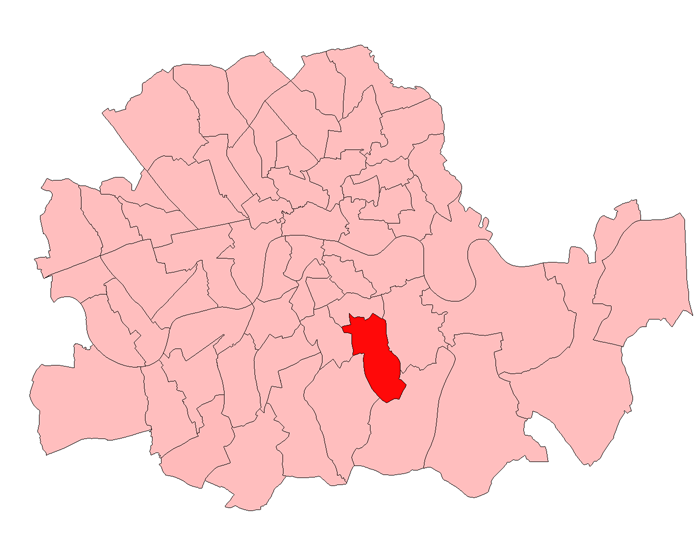
Peckham

London County Council election, 1919: Peckham
| Party | Candidate | Votes | % | ±% |
|---|---|---|---|---|
| Progressive | **Thomas Gautrey** | Unopposed | n/a | n/a |
| Progressive | **Earl of Haddo** | Unopposed | n/a | n/a |
| Progressive **hold** | | Swing | n/a | |
| Progressive **hold** | | Swing | n/a | |

=== Chelsea ===
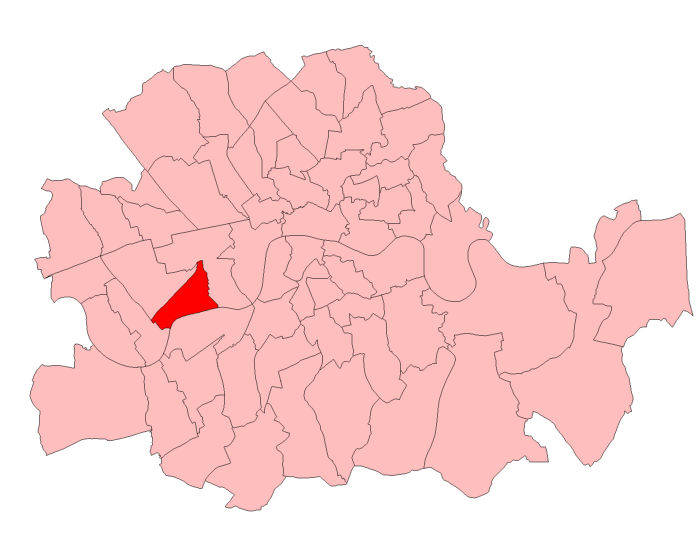
Chelsea

London County Council election, 1919: Chelsea
| Party | Candidate | Votes | % | ±% |
|---|---|---|---|---|
| Municipal Reform | **Ernest Louis Meinertzhagen** | Unopposed | n/a | n/a |
| Municipal Reform | **Ronald Collet Norman** | Unopposed | n/a | n/a |
| Municipal Reform **hold** | | Swing | n/a | |
| Municipal Reform **hold** | | Swing | n/a | |

=== City of London ===
London County Council election, 1919: City of London
| Party | Candidate | Votes | % | ±% |
|---|---|---|---|---|
| Municipal Reform | **Sir John Lulham Pound** | Unopposed | n/a | n/a |
| Municipal Reform | **William Wilson Grantham** | Unopposed | n/a | n/a |
| Municipal Reform | **Sir Percy Coleman Simmons** | Unopposed | n/a | n/a |
| Municipal Reform | Sir George Rowland Blades | Unopposed | n/a | n/a |
| Municipal Reform **hold** | | Swing | n/a | |
| Municipal Reform **hold** | | Swing | n/a | |
| Municipal Reform **hold** | | Swing | n/a | |
| Municipal Reform **hold** | | Swing | n/a | |

=== Deptford ===
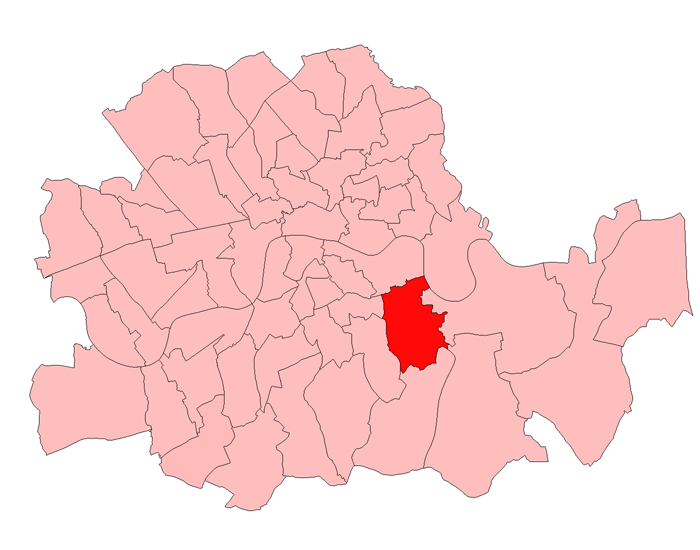
Deptford

London County Council election, 1919: Deptford
| Party | Candidate | Votes | % | ±% |
|---|---|---|---|---|
| **Labour** | **Margaret McMillan** | **4,575** | **31.0** | |
| **Labour** | **John Speakman** | **4,356** | **29.5** | |
| Municipal Reform | William Francis Marchant | 3,094 | 21.0 | |
| Municipal Reform | Fred Bramston | 2,730 | 18.5 | |
| Majority | | 1,262 | 8.6 | |
| Labour **gain** from Progressive | | Swing | | |
| Labour **gain** from Municipal Reform | | Swing | | |

=== Finsbury ===
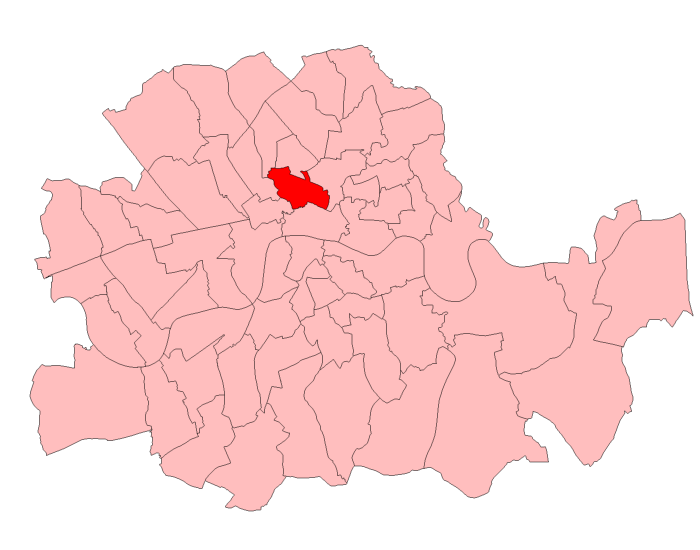
Finsbury

London County Council election, 1919: Finsbury
| Party | Candidate | Votes | % | ±% |
|---|---|---|---|---|
| Progressive | **George Masterman Gillett** | 2,897 | 29.9 | |
| Progressive | **Alfred Baker** | 2,569 | 26.5 | |
| Municipal Reform | Henry Baldwin Barton | 2,146 | 22.2 | |
| Municipal Reform | **James Little** | 2,073 | 21.4 | |
| Majority | | 423 | 4.3 | |
| Progressive **hold** | | Swing | | |
| Progressive **hold** | | Swing | | |

=== Fulham ===
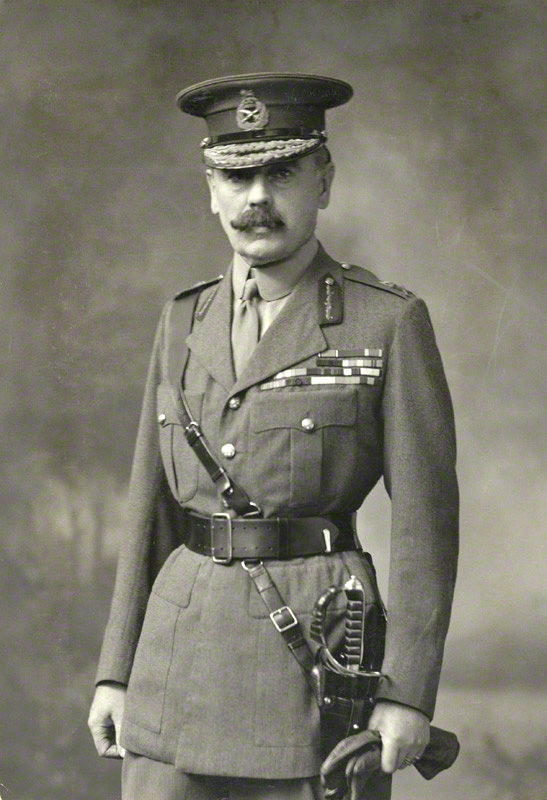
Lloyd

London County Council election, 1919: Fulham East
| Party | Candidate | Votes | % | ±% |
|---|---|---|---|---|
| **Municipal Reform** | **Sir Francis Lloyd** | **2,747** | **34.8** | |
| **Municipal Reform** | **Beatrix Margaret Lyall** | **2,673** | **33.8** | |
| Labour | Dr Robert Dunstan | 1,264 | 16.0 | |
| Labour | L A. Hill | 1,218 | 15.4 | |
| Majority | | 1,409 | 17.8 | |
| Municipal Reform **hold** | | Swing | | |
| Municipal Reform **hold** | | Swing | | |

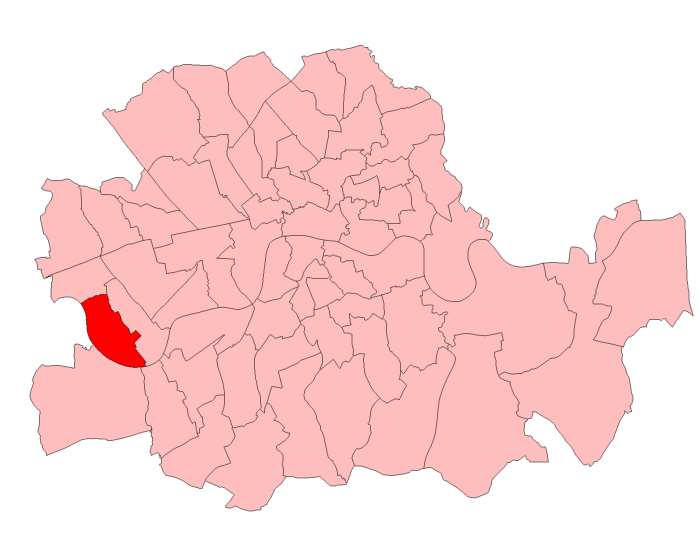
Fulham West

London County Council election, 1919: Fulham West
| Party | Candidate | Votes | % | ±% |
|---|---|---|---|---|
| Municipal Reform | **Sir Cyril Stephen Cobb** | 3,834 | 34.8 | |
| Municipal Reform | **William Ward Warner** | 3,542 | 32.2 | |
| Labour | Robert Mark Gentry | 1,934 | 17.6 | |
| Labour | John Palmer | 1,695 | 15.4 | |
| Majority | | 1,608 | 14.6 | |
| Municipal Reform **hold** | | Swing | | |
| Municipal Reform **hold** | | Swing | | |

=== Greenwich ===
Hume

London County Council election, 1919: Greenwich
| Party | Candidate | Votes | % | ±% |
|---|---|---|---|---|
| Municipal Reform | **Ernest Martin Dence** | Unopposed | n/a | n/a |
| Municipal Reform | **George Hopwood Hume** | Unopposed | n/a | n/a |
| Municipal Reform **hold** | | Swing | n/a | |
| Municipal Reform **hold** | | Swing | n/a | |

=== Hackney ===
Adler

London County Council election, 1919: Hackney Central
| Party | Candidate | Votes | % | ±% |
|---|---|---|---|---|
| Progressive | **Henrietta Adler** | Unopposed | n/a | n/a |
| Municipal Reform | **William Ray** | Unopposed | n/a | n/a |
| Progressive **hold** | | Swing | n/a | |
| Municipal Reform **hold** | | Swing | n/a | |

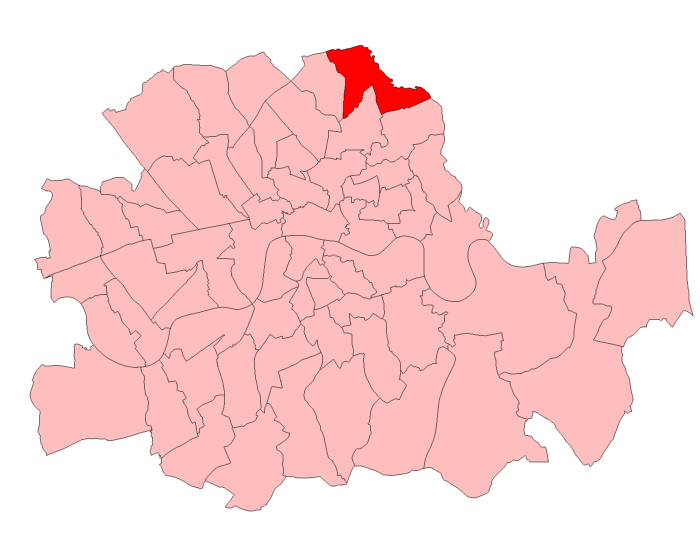
Hackney North

London County Council election, 1919: Hackney North
| Party | Candidate | Votes | % | ±% |
|---|---|---|---|---|
| Municipal Reform | Lady Trustram Eve | Unopposed | n/a | n/a |
| Municipal Reform | **Oscar Emanuel Warburg** | Unopposed | n/a | n/a |
| Municipal Reform **hold** | | Swing | n/a | |
| Municipal Reform **hold** | | Swing | n/a | |

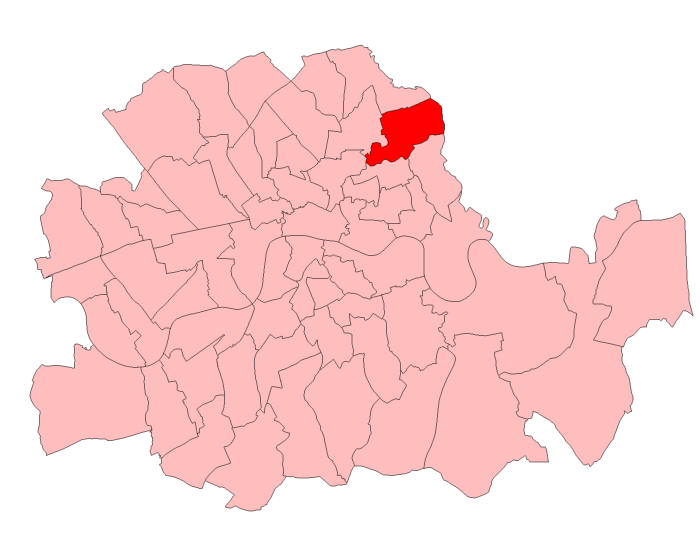
Hackney South

London County Council election, 1919: Hackney South
| Party | Candidate | Votes | % | ±% |
|---|---|---|---|---|
| Progressive | **Theodore Chapman** | Unopposed | n/a | n/a |
| Progressive | John James McClelland | Unopposed | n/a | n/a |
| Progressive **hold** | | Swing | n/a | |
| Progressive **gain** from Municipal Reform | | Swing | n/a | |

=== Hammersmith ===
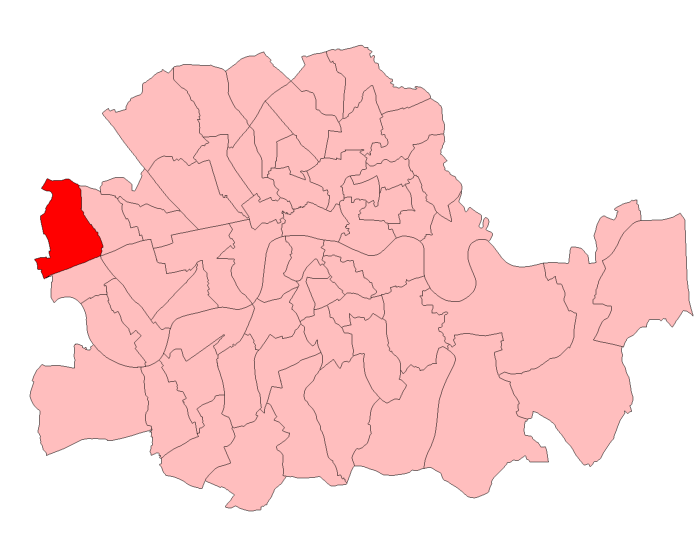
Hammersmith North

London County Council election, 1919: Hammersmith North
| Party | Candidate | Votes | % | ±% |
|---|---|---|---|---|
| Municipal Reform | Frank Mayle | 1,557 | 36.4 | |
| Municipal Reform | David Cawdron | 1,421 | 33.2 | |
| Labour | T Martin | 1,296 | 30.3 | |
| Majority | | 125 | 2.9 | |
| Municipal Reform **hold** | | Swing | | |
| Municipal Reform **hold** | | Swing | | |

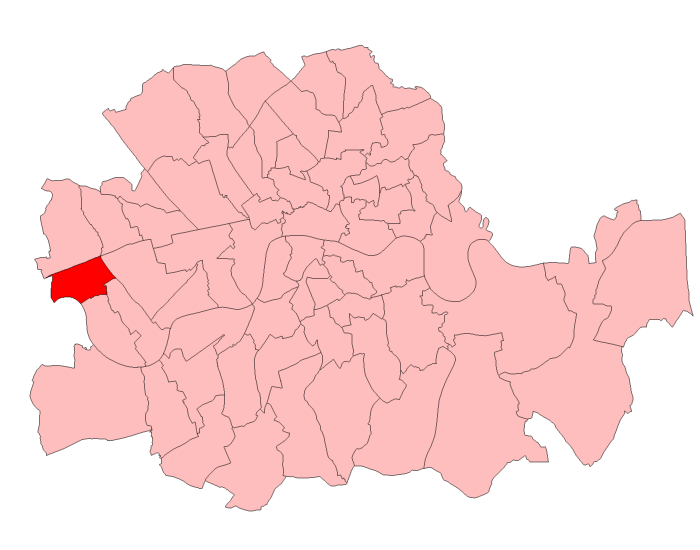
Hammersmith South

London County Council election, 1919: Hammersmith South
| Party | Candidate | Votes | % | ±% |
|---|---|---|---|---|
| Municipal Reform | **Francis Robert Ince Anderton** | 2,168 | 40.4 | |
| Municipal Reform | **Isidore Salmon** | 2,109 | 39.3 | |
| Labour | Dora Montefiore | 1,093 | 20.4 | |
| Majority | | 1,016 | 18.9 | |
| Municipal Reform **hold** | | Swing | | |
| Municipal Reform **hold** | | Swing | | |

=== Hampstead ===
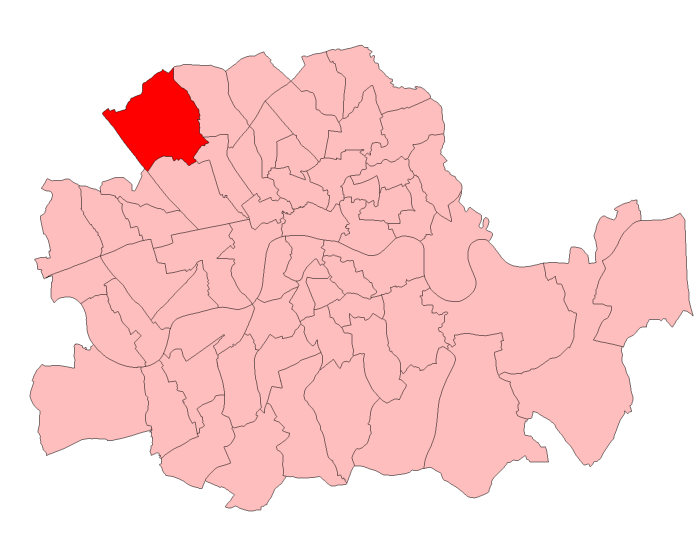
Hampstead

London County Council election, 1919: Hampstead
| Party | Candidate | Votes | % | ±% |
|---|---|---|---|---|
| Municipal Reform | **Andrew Thomas Taylor** | 3,378 | | |
| Municipal Reform | **Walter Reynolds** | 3,289 | | |
| Labour | Benjamin Skene Mackay | 1,352 | | |
| Labour | Rev. Arthur Stuart Duncan-Jones | 1,286 | | |
| Majority | | 1,937 | | |
| Municipal Reform **hold** | | Swing | | |
| Municipal Reform **hold** | | Swing | | |

=== Holborn ===
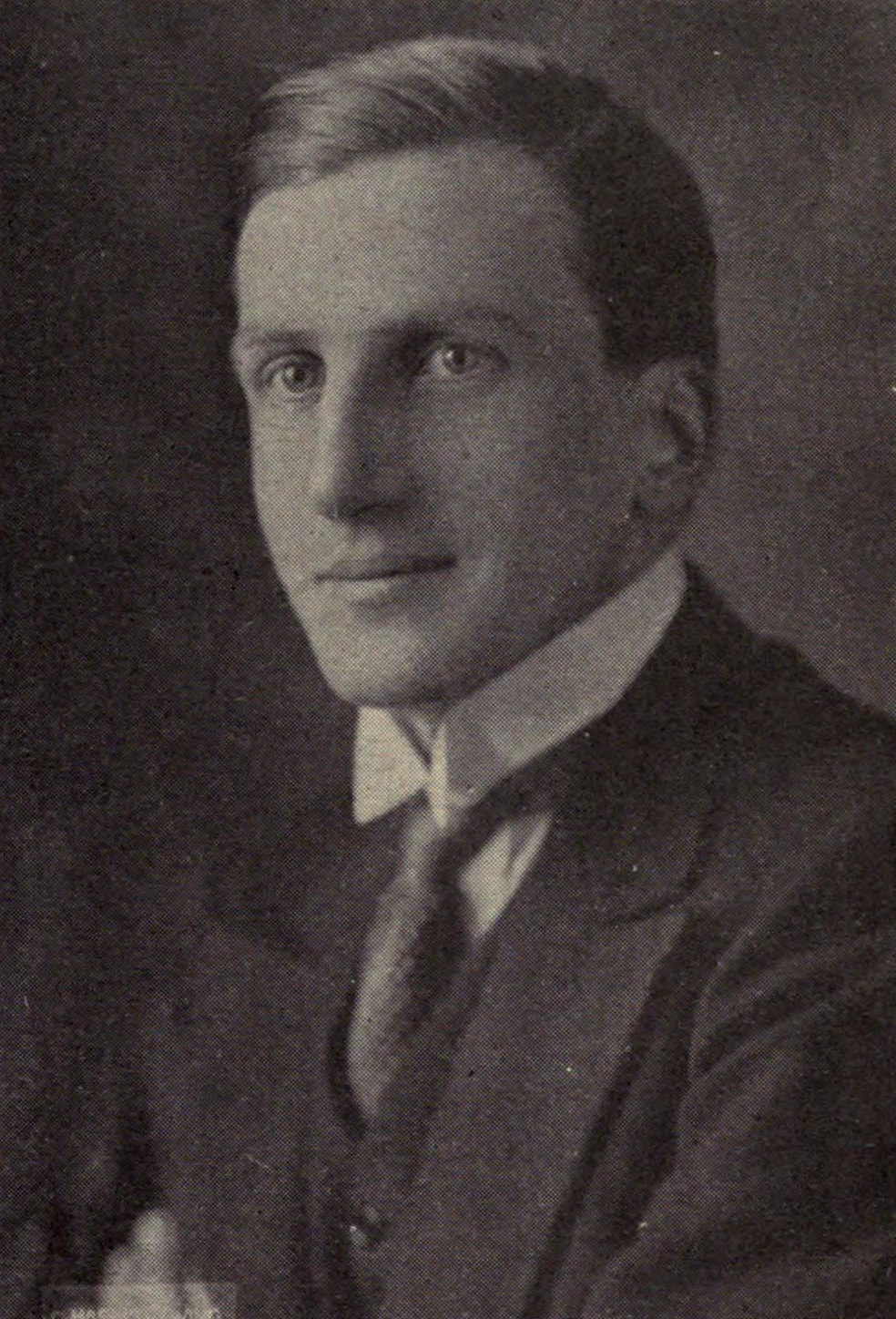
Percy

London County Council election, 1919: Holborn
| Party | Candidate | Votes | % | ±% |
|---|---|---|---|---|
| Municipal Reform | **Robert Inigo Tasker** | Unopposed | n/a | n/a |
| Municipal Reform | **Lord Eustace Percy** | Unopposed | n/a | n/a |
| Municipal Reform **hold** | | Swing | n/a | |
| Municipal Reform **hold** | | Swing | n/a | |

=== Islington ===
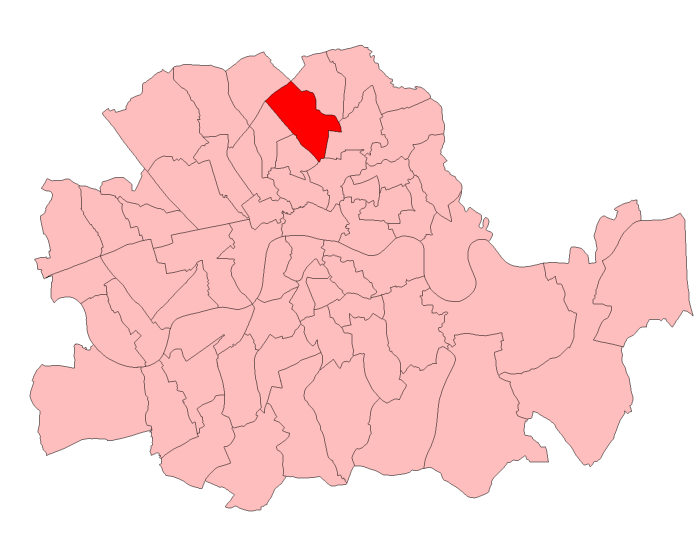
Islington East

London County Council election, 1919: Islington East
| Party | Candidate | Votes | % | ±% |
|---|---|---|---|---|
| Progressive | **William Lace Clague** | 3,438 | 35.3 | |
| Progressive | Jack Percy Blake | 3,289 | 33.8 | |
| Municipal Reform | George King Naylor | 1,514 | 15.6 | |
| Municipal Reform | Henry Myers | 1,490 | 15.3 | |
| Majority | | 1,775 | 18.2 | |
| Progressive **hold** | | Swing | | |
| Progressive **hold** | | Swing | | |

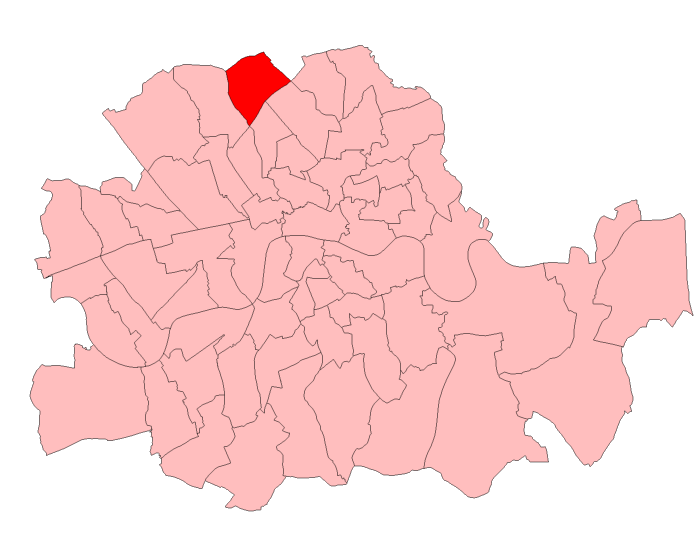
Islington North

London County Council election, 1919: Islington North
| Party | Candidate | Votes | % | ±% |
|---|---|---|---|---|
| Labour | Robert McKenna | 1,791 | 49.5 | |
| Municipal Reform | **Frederick Lionel Dove** | 915 | 25.3 | |
| Municipal Reform | Alfred Sim | 910 | 25.2 | |
| Majority | | 876 | 24.2 | |
| Municipal Reform **hold** | | Swing | n/a | |
| Labour **gain** from Municipal Reform | | Swing | | |

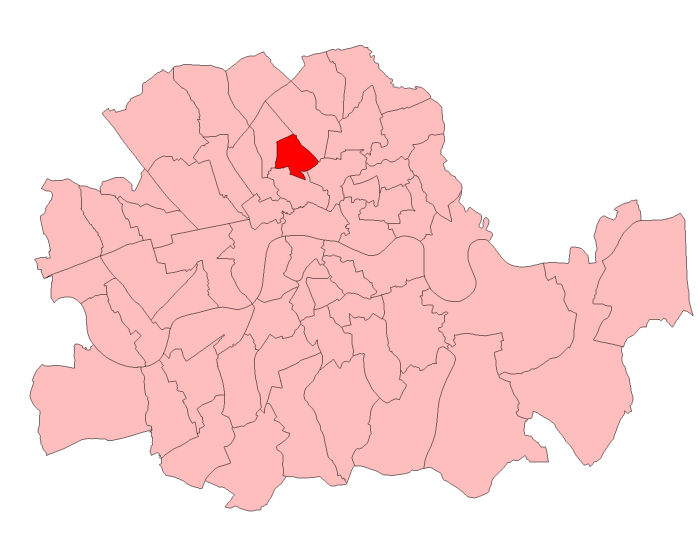
Islington South

London County Council election, 1919: Islington South
| Party | Candidate | Votes | % | ±% |
|---|---|---|---|---|
| Progressive | **Howell Jones Williams** | Unopposed | n/a | n/a |
| Progressive | **George Dew** | Unopposed | n/a | n/a |
| Progressive **hold** | | Swing | n/a | |
| Progressive **hold** | | Swing | n/a | |

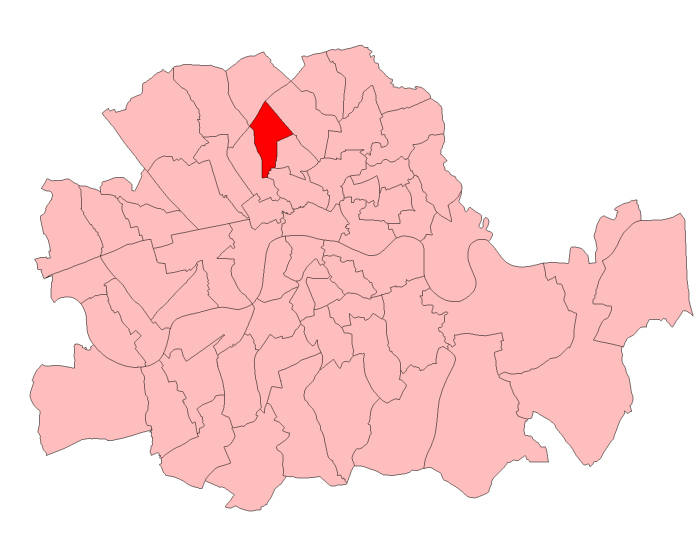
Islington West

London County Council election, 1919: Islington West
| Party | Candidate | Votes | % | ±% |
|---|---|---|---|---|
| Progressive | **Henry Mills** | Unopposed | n/a | n/a |
| Progressive | James Skinner | Unopposed | n/a | n/a |
| Progressive **hold** | | Swing | n/a | |
| Progressive **hold** | | Swing | n/a | |

=== Kensington ===
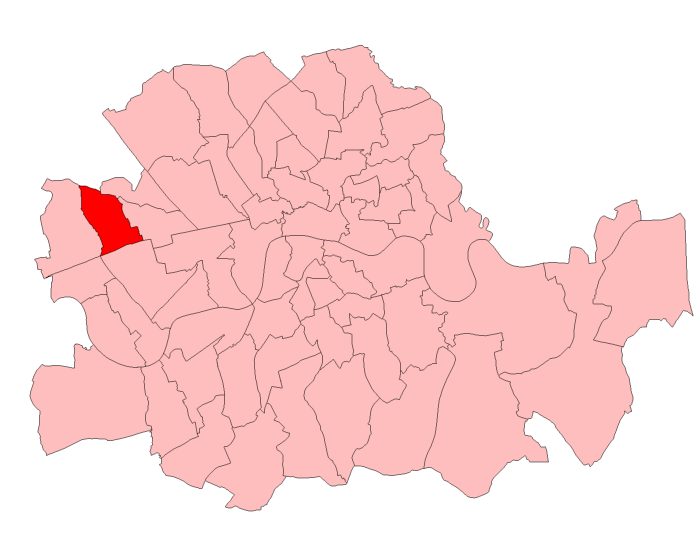
Kensington North

London County Council election, 1919: Kensington North
| Party | Candidate | Votes | % | ±% |
|---|---|---|---|---|
| Municipal Reform | **David Davis** | Unopposed | n/a | n/a |
| Municipal Reform | **Cecil Bingham Levita** | Unopposed | n/a | n/a |
| Municipal Reform **hold** | | Swing | n/a | |
| Municipal Reform **hold** | | Swing | n/a | |

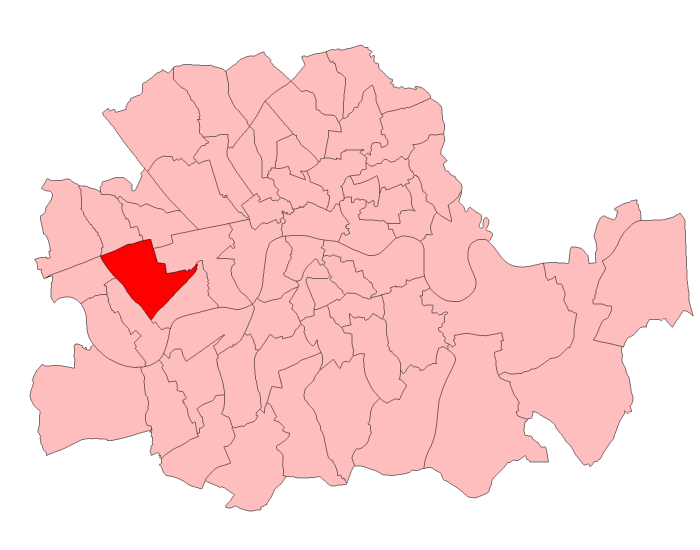
Kensington South

London County Council election, 1919: Kensington South
| Party | Candidate | Votes | % | ±% |
|---|---|---|---|---|
| Municipal Reform | **William Frederick Cavaye** | Unopposed | n/a | n/a |
| Municipal Reform | **Henry Vincent Rowe** | Unopposed | n/a | n/a |
| Municipal Reform **hold** | | Swing | n/a | |
| Municipal Reform **hold** | | Swing | n/a | |

=== Lambeth ===
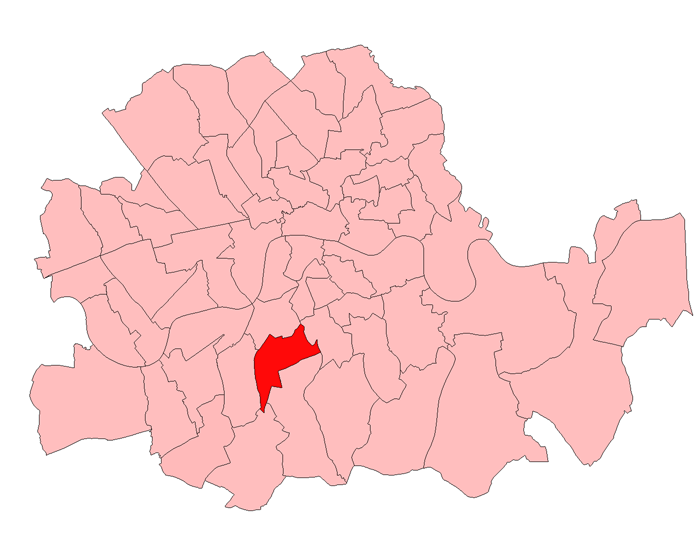
Brixton

London County Council election, 1919: Brixton
| Party | Candidate | Votes | % | ±% |
|---|---|---|---|---|
| Municipal Reform | Sir Charles Henry Gibbs | 2,159 | 32.0 | |
| Municipal Reform | **Ernest Gray MP** | 2,102 | 31.2 | |
| Labour | Horace Herbert Tavender | 1,261 | 18.7 | |
| Labour | W. Burroughs | 1,216 | 18.1 | |
| Majority | | 841 | 12.5 | |
| Municipal Reform **hold** | | Swing | | |
| Municipal Reform **hold** | | Swing | | |

Gosling

London County Council election, 1919: Kennington
| Party | Candidate | Votes | % | ±% |
|---|---|---|---|---|
| Labour | **Harry Gosling** | 2,764 | 31.6 | |
| Progressive | **Sir John Williams Benn** | 2,743 | 31.3 | |
| Municipal Reform | Frederick Benjamin Oliphant Hawes | 1,685 | 19.3 | |
| Municipal Reform | Henry David Reginald Margesson | 1,558 | 17.8 | |
| Majority | | 1,058 | 12.0 | |
| Progressive **hold** | | Swing | | |
| Labour **gain** from Municipal Reform | | Swing | | |

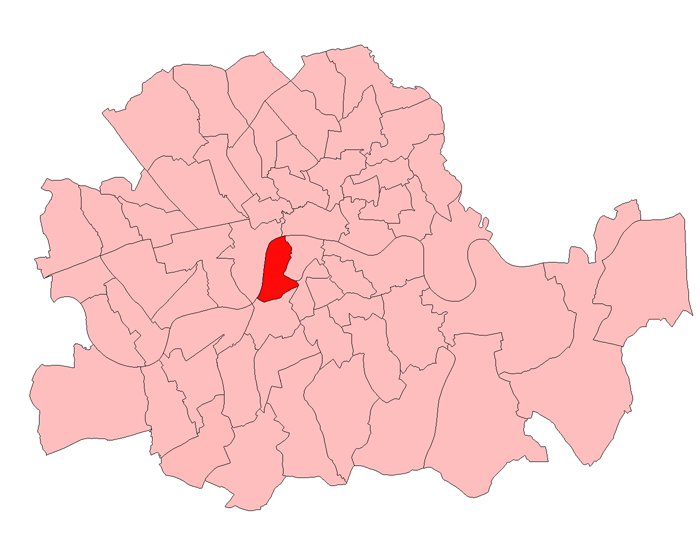
Lambeth North

London County Council election, 1919: Lambeth North
| Party | Candidate | Votes | % | ±% |
|---|---|---|---|---|
| Progressive | Thomas Owen Jacobsen | 2,656 | 38.1 | |
| Independent | Rose Emma Lamartine Yates | 2,619 | 37.6 | n/a |
| Municipal Reform | **Louis Courtauld** | 885 | 12.7 | |
| Municipal Reform | Dr. Camac Wilkinson | 809 | 11.6 | |
| Majority | | 1,734 | 24.9 | |
| Progressive **hold** | | Swing | | |
| Independent **gain** from Municipal Reform | | Swing | n/a | |

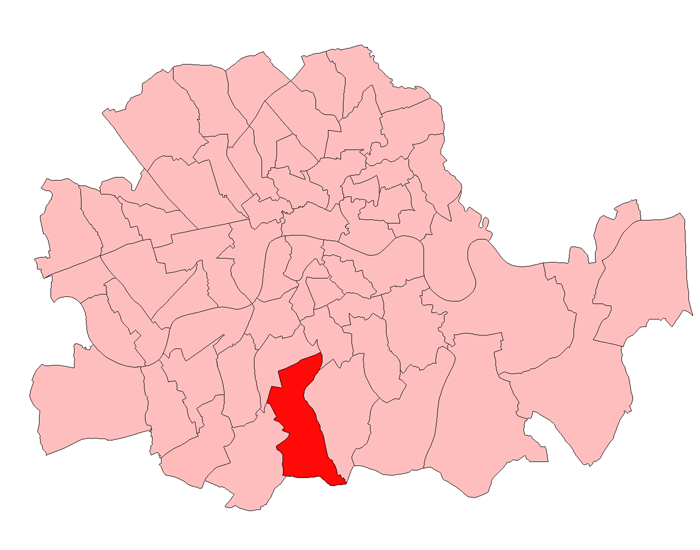
Norwood

London County Council election, 1919: Norwood
| Party | Candidate | Votes | % | ±% |
|---|---|---|---|---|
| Municipal Reform | **Cecil Urquhart Fisher** | Unopposed | n/a | n/a |
| Municipal Reform | **Forbes St John Morrow** | Unopposed | n/a | n/a |
| Municipal Reform **hold** | | Swing | n/a | |
| Municipal Reform **hold** | | Swing | n/a | |

=== Lewisham ===
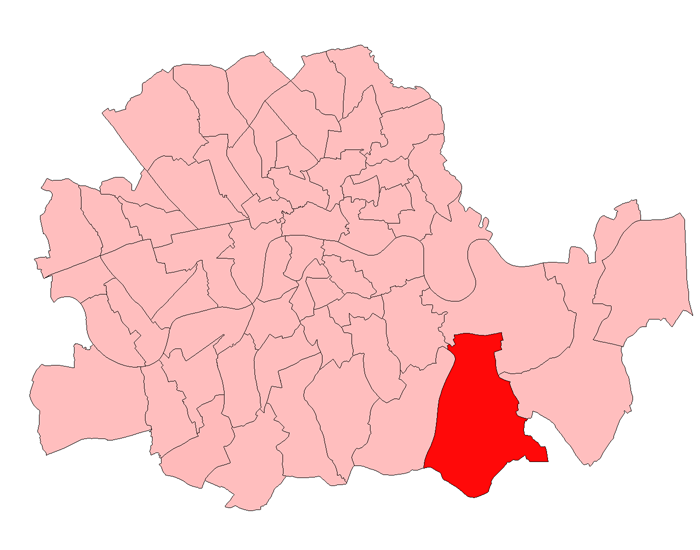
Lewisham East

London County Council election, 1919: Lewisham East
| Party | Candidate | Votes | % | ±% |
|---|---|---|---|---|
| Municipal Reform | Eric Ball | Unopposed | n/a | n/a |
| Municipal Reform | Richard Owen Roberts | Unopposed | n/a | n/a |
| Municipal Reform **hold** | | Swing | n/a | |
| Municipal Reform **hold** | | Swing | n/a | |

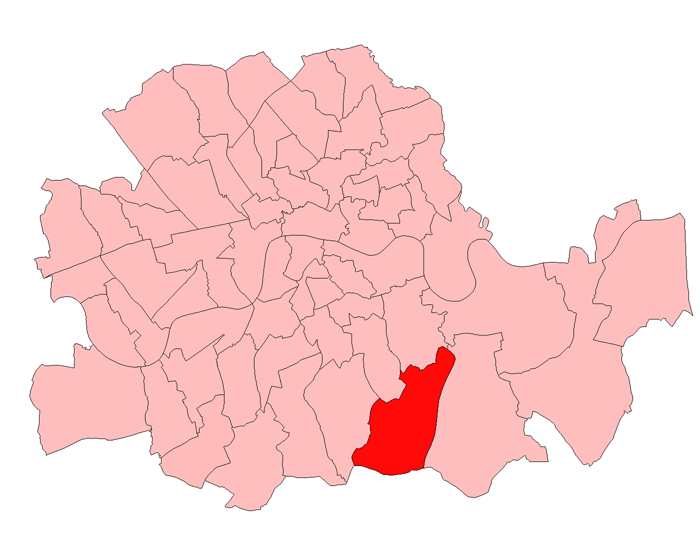
Lewisham West

London County Council election, 1919: Lewisham West
| Party | Candidate | Votes | % | ±% |
|---|---|---|---|---|
| Municipal Reform | Philip Dawson | 3,438 | 27.2 | |
| Municipal Reform | **Robert Jackson** | 3,320 | 26.3 | |
| Progressive | Frank Walter Raffety | 2,950 | 23.4 | |
| Progressive | G. H. Stepney | 2,915 | 23.1 | |
| Majority | | 370 | 2.9 | |
| Municipal Reform **hold** | | Swing | | |
| Municipal Reform **hold** | | Swing | | |

=== Paddington ===
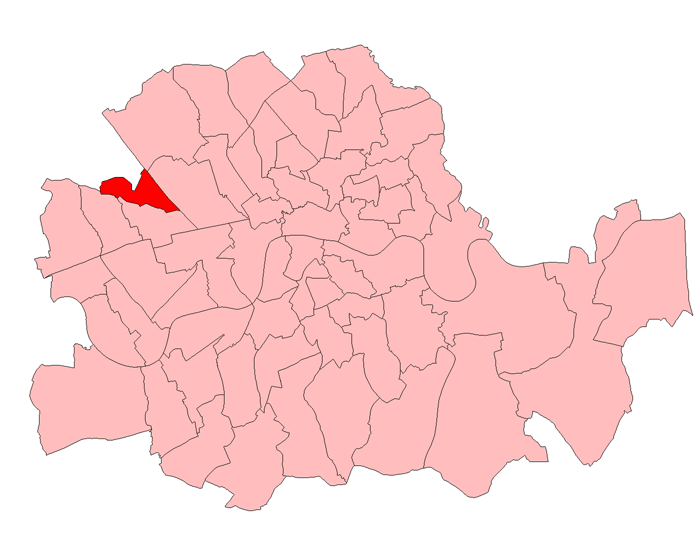
Paddington North

London County Council election, 1919: Paddington North
| Party | Candidate | Votes | % | ±% |
|---|---|---|---|---|
| Municipal Reform | **John Herbert Hunter** | 1,938 | 28.8 | |
| Municipal Reform | **Herbert Lidiard** | 1,864 | 27.7 | |
| Labour | Charles Terry Hendin | 1,470 | 21.9 | |
| Labour | Hugh Roberts | 1,454 | 21.6 | |
| Majority | | 394 | 5.8 | |
| Municipal Reform **hold** | | Swing | | |
| Municipal Reform **hold** | | Swing | | |

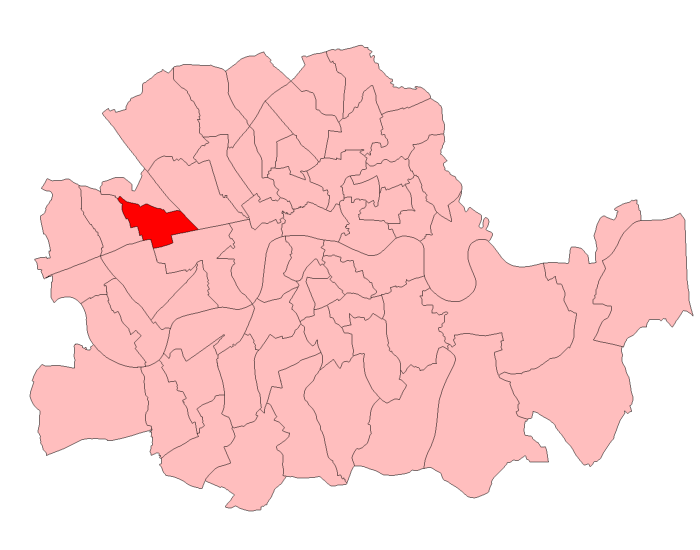
Paddington South

London County Council election, 1919: Paddington South
| Party | Candidate | Votes | % | ±% |
|---|---|---|---|---|
| Municipal Reform | **John Burgess-Preston Karslake** | | | |
| Municipal Reform | **Harry Barned Lewis-Barned** | | | |
| Municipal Reform **hold** | | Swing | | |
| Municipal Reform **hold** | | Swing | | |

=== Poplar ===
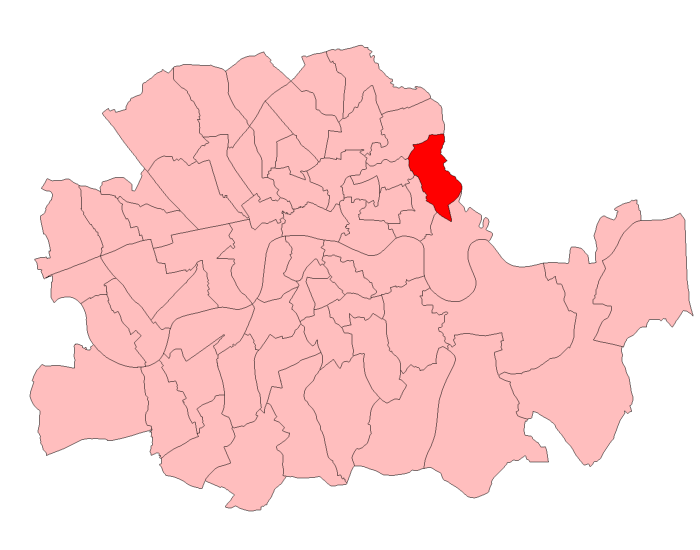
Bow and Bromley

London County Council election, 1919: Bow and Bromley
| Party | Candidate | Votes | % | ±% |
|---|---|---|---|---|
| Labour | Charles Edwin Sumner | 3,461 | | |
| Labour | Edward Cruse | 3,169 | | |
| Independent | Rev. W H Hunt | 1,224 | 21.6 | |
| Municipal Reform | Herbert Geraint Williams | 1,193 | | |
| Municipal Reform | Malcolm Campbell-Johnston | 1,061 | | |
| Majority | | | | |
| Labour **gain** from Municipal Reform | | Swing | | |
| Labour **gain** from Municipal Reform | | Swing | | |

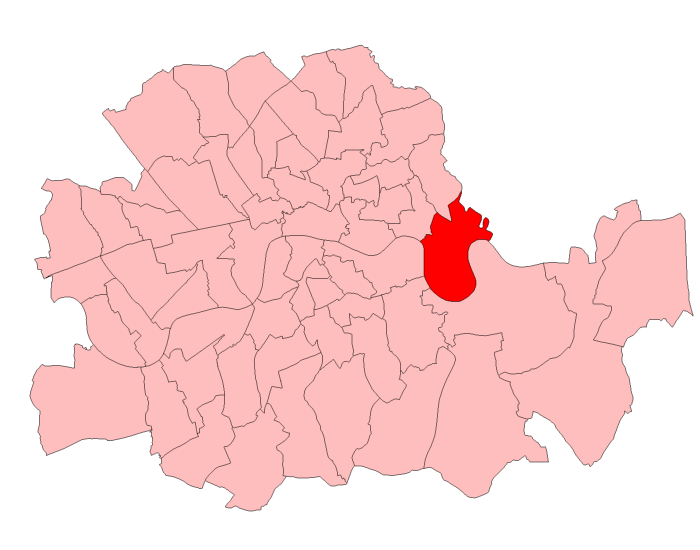
Poplar South

London County Council election, 1919: Poplar South
| Party | Candidate | Votes | % | ±% |
|---|---|---|---|---|
| Labour | Samuel March | 3,466 | | |
| Labour | **Arabella Susan Lawrence** | 3,317 | | |
| Progressive | Fred Thorne | 1,528 | | |
| Progressive | John Bussey | 1,313 | | |
| Majority | | | | |
| Labour **hold** | | Swing | | |
| Labour **gain** from Progressive | | Swing | | |

=== St Marylebone ===
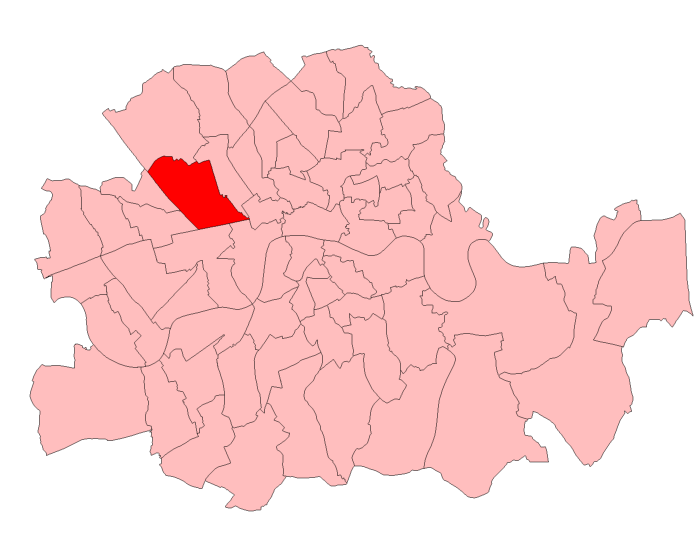
St Marylebone

London County Council election, 1919: St Marylebone
| Party | Candidate | Votes | % | ±% |
|---|---|---|---|---|
| Municipal Reform | **Eustace Widdrington Morrison-Bell** | Unopposed | | |
| Municipal Reform | **Ernest Sanger** | Unopposed | | |
| Municipal Reform **hold** | | Swing | | |
| Municipal Reform **hold** | | Swing | | |

=== St Pancras ===
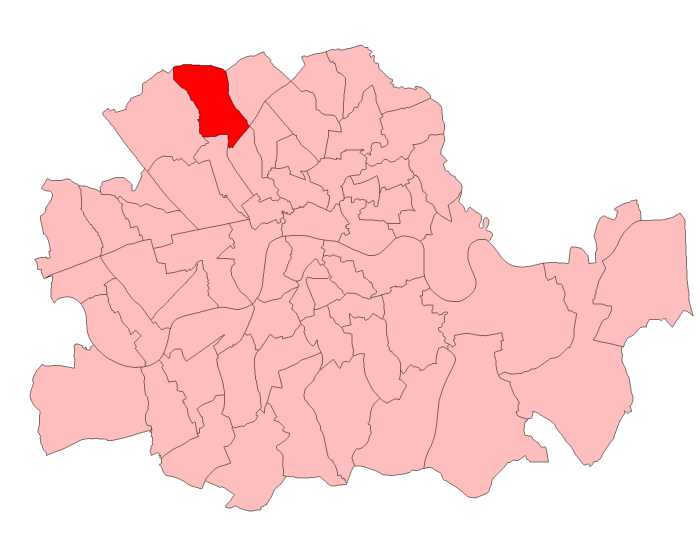
St Pancras North

London County Council election, 1919: St. Pancras North
| Party | Candidate | Votes | % | ±% |
|---|---|---|---|---|
| Progressive | William Lloyd-Taylor | Unopposed | | |
| Progressive | John Hunter Harley | Unopposed | | |
| Majority | | | | |
| Progressive **hold** | | Swing | | |
| Progressive **hold** | | Swing | | |

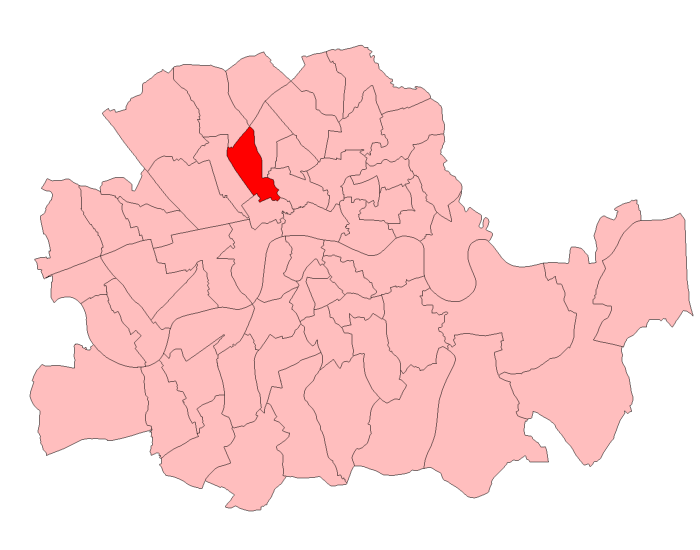
St Pancras South East

London County Council election, 1919: St. Pancras South East
| Party | Candidate | Votes | % | ±% |
|---|---|---|---|---|
| Municipal Reform | Mrs Ethelind J Hopkins | 2,106 | | |
| Municipal Reform | **David Davies** | 2,015 | | |
| Progressive | **Albert William Claremont** | 1,455 | | |
| Progressive | **Henry de Rosenbach Walker** | 1,420 | | |
| Majority | | | | |
| Municipal Reform **hold** | | Swing | | |
| Municipal Reform **hold** | | Swing | | |

- N.B.: Davies had been an outgoing councillor for St Pancras South, Claremont and Walker were outgoing councillors for St Pancras East

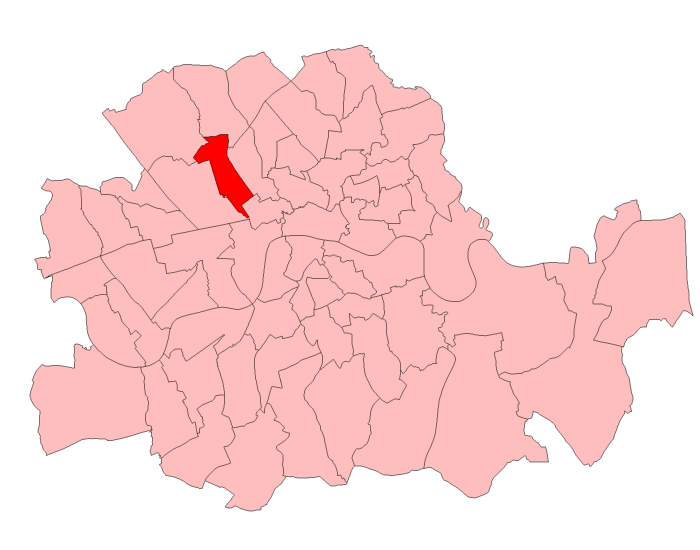
St Pancras South West

London County Council election, 1919: St. Pancras South West
| Party | Candidate | Votes | % | ±% |
|---|---|---|---|---|
| Municipal Reform | **Auberon Claud Hegan Kennard** | Unopposed | | |
| Municipal Reform | Charles William Matthews | Unopposed | | |
| Majority | | | | |
| Municipal Reform **hold** | | Swing | | |
| Municipal Reform **hold** | | Swing | | |

=== Shoreditch ===
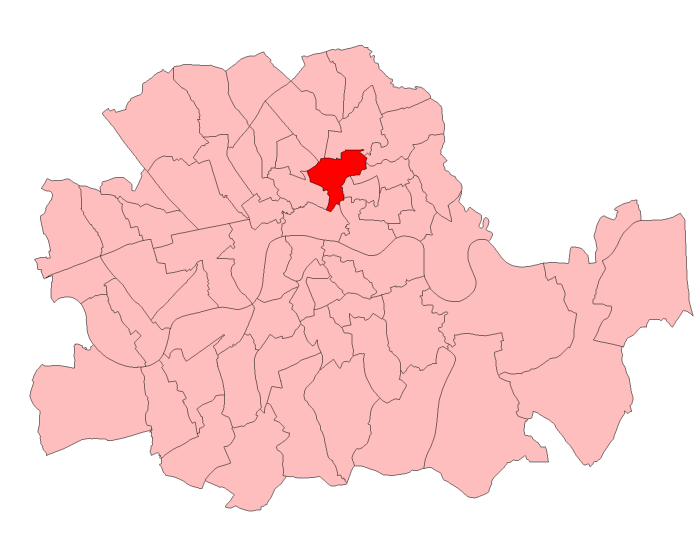
Shoreditch

London County Council election, 1919: Shoreditch
| Party | Candidate | Votes | % | ±% |
|---|---|---|---|---|
| Progressive | **Henry Ward** | 1,701 | | |
| Labour | Charles Edward Taylor | 1,464 | 35.3 | |
| Progressive | Godfrey Russell Vick | 1,454 | | |
| Municipal Reform | Major W Weber | 1,116 | | |
| Municipal Reform | Rosamund Smith | 1,110 | | |
| Progressive **hold** | | Swing | | |
| Labour **gain** from Progressive | | Swing | | |

=== Southwark ===
London County Council election, 1919: Southwark Central
| Party | Candidate | Votes | % | ±% |
|---|---|---|---|---|
| Progressive | **James Daniel Gilbert MP** | Unopposed | n/a | n/a |
| Progressive | George Henry Cook | Unopposed | n/a | n/a |
| Progressive **hold** | | Swing | n/a | |
| Progressive **hold** | | Swing | n/a | |

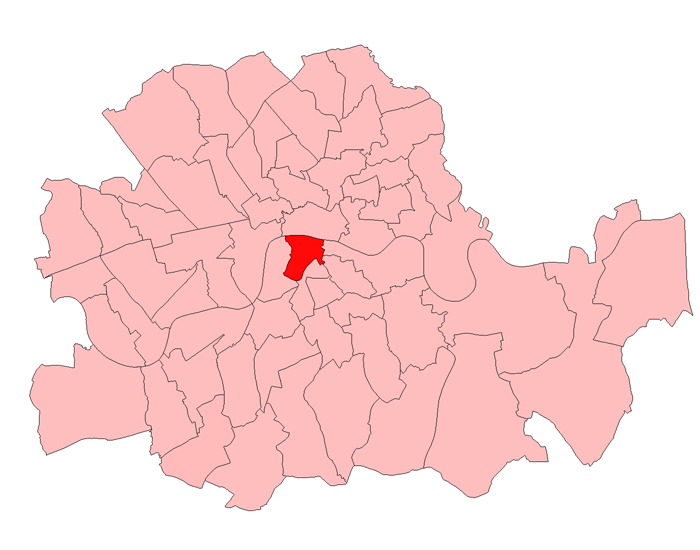
Southwark North

London County Council election, 1919: Southwark North
| Party | Candidate | Votes | % | ±% |
|---|---|---|---|---|
| Progressive | **Duchess of Marlborough** | 2,602 | 39.9 | |
| Progressive | Walter James Wightman | 2,392 | 36.7 | |
| Labour | J. Osborne | 764 | 11.7 | |
| Labour | S. G. Weaver | 761 | 11.7 | |
| Majority | | 1,628 | 25.0 | |
| Progressive **hold** | | Swing | | |
| Progressive **hold** | | Swing | | |

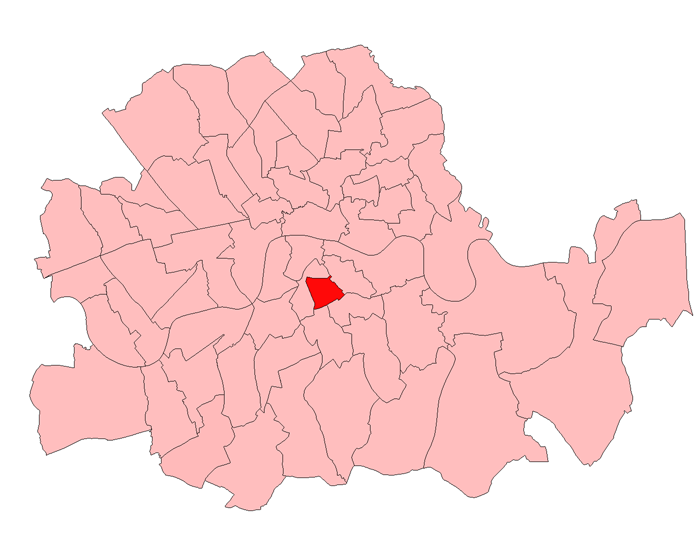
Southwark South East

London County Council election, 1919: Southwark South East
| Party | Candidate | Votes | % | ±% |
|---|---|---|---|---|
| Progressive | Rev. John Charles Morris | 1,864 | 39.0 | |
| Progressive | William James Pincombe | 1,864 | 39.0 | |
| Labour | Benjamin Thomas Embleton | 1,053 | 22.0 | |
| Majority | | 811 | 17.0 | |
| Progressive **hold** | | Swing | | |
| Progressive **hold** | | Swing | | |

=== Stepney ===
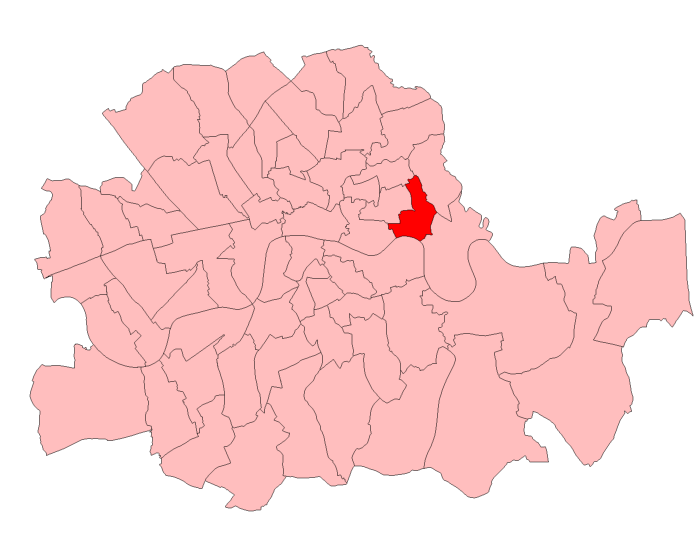
Limehouse

London County Council election, 1919: Limehouse
| Party | Candidate | Votes | % | ±% |
|---|---|---|---|---|
| Progressive | **Henry Marks** | 1,269 | 23.1 | |
| Labour | **Robert M Bryan** | 1,244 | 22.6 | |
| Labour | Clement Richard Attlee | 1,147 | 20.8 | |
| Independent | R. Ridge | 1,110 | 20.2 | |
| Progressive | Miss Ida Samuel | 732 | 13.3 | |
| Majority | | 97 | 0.2 | |
| Progressive **hold** | | Swing | | |
| Labour **gain** from Progressive | | Swing | | |

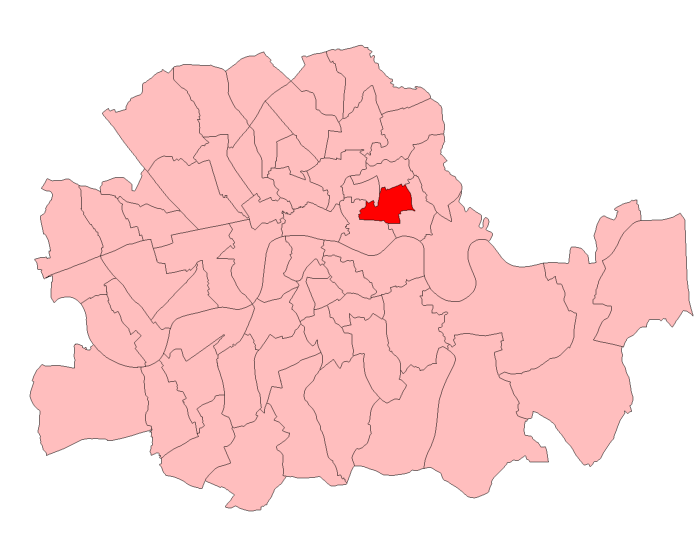
Mile End

London County Council election, 1919: Mile End
| Party | Candidate | Votes | % | ±% |
|---|---|---|---|---|
| Municipal Reform | **Alfred Ordway Goodrich** | 1,874 | 31.2 | |
| Municipal Reform | **David Hazel** | 1,800 | 29.9 | |
| Labour | I. Sharp | 1,172 | 19.5 | |
| Labour | Bernard Noël Langdon-Davies | 1,166 | 19.4 | |
| Majority | | 628 | 10.4 | |
| Municipal Reform **hold** | | Swing | | |
| Municipal Reform **gain** from Progressive | | Swing | | |

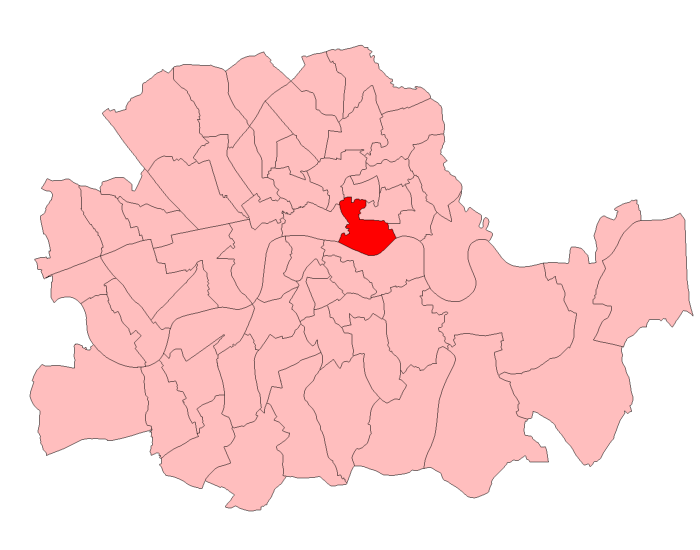
Whitechapel & St George's

London County Council election, 1919: Whitechapel
| Party | Candidate | Votes | % | ±% |
|---|---|---|---|---|
| Progressive | **Henry Herman Gordon** | Unopposed | n/a | n/a |
| Progressive | **William Cowlishaw Johnson** | Unopposed | n/a | n/a |
| Progressive **hold** | | Swing | | |
| Progressive **hold** | | Swing | | |

=== Stoke Newington ===
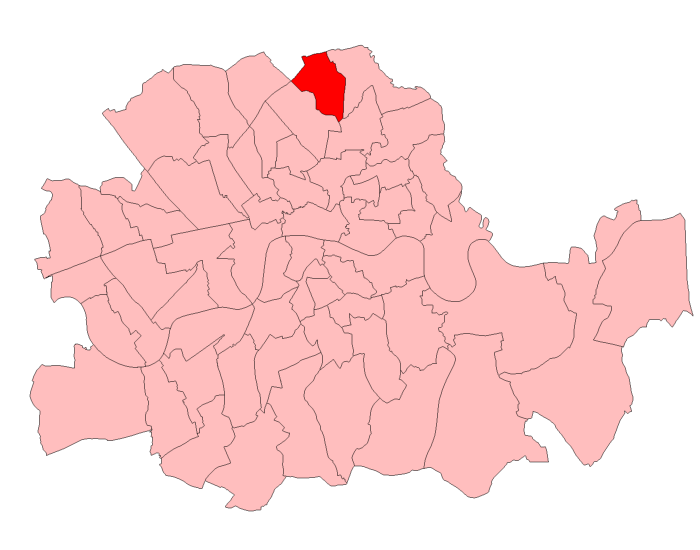
Stoke Newington

London County Council election, 1919: Stoke Newington
| Party | Candidate | Votes | % | ±% |
|---|---|---|---|---|
| Municipal Reform | Edward Holton Coumbe | 1,508 | 43.3 | |
| Municipal Reform | Walter Henry Key | 1,451 | 41.7 | |
| Independent | George Wicks | 523 | 15.0 | |
| Majority | | 928 | 26.7 | |
| Municipal Reform **hold** | | Swing | | |
| Municipal Reform **hold** | | Swing | | |

=== Wandsworth ===
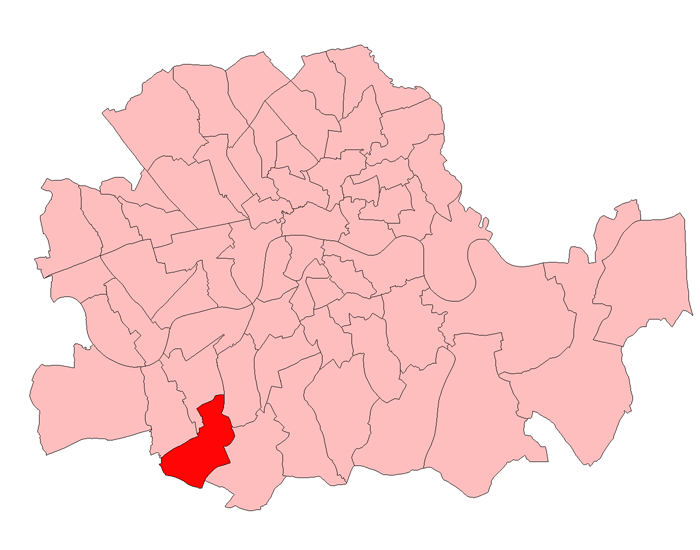
Balham and Tooting

London County Council election, 1919: Balham & Tooting
| Party | Candidate | Votes | % | ±% |
|---|---|---|---|---|
| Progressive | Rev. Bevill Allen | 3,149 | 27.1 | |
| Progressive | Rev. Henry Herman Carlisle | 3,082 | 26.5 | |
| Municipal Reform | William P Mellhuish | 1,584 | 13.6 | |
| Municipal Reform | Harry Ralph Selley | 1,542 | 13.3 | |
| Labour | W. Eland | 1,200 | 10.3 | |
| Labour | R. Champion | 1,059 | 9.1 | |
| Majority | | 1,498 | 12.9 | |
| Progressive **hold** | | Swing | | |
| Progressive **hold** | | Swing | | |

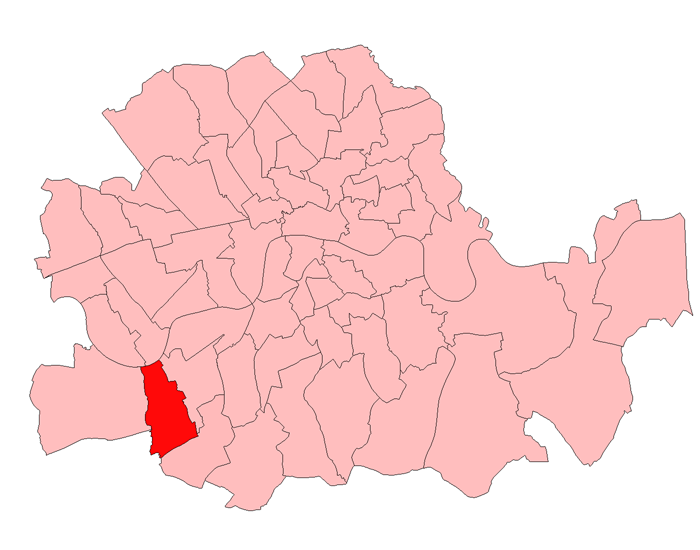
Wandsworth Central

London County Council election, 1919: Wandsworth Central
| Party | Candidate | Votes | % | ±% |
|---|---|---|---|---|
| Municipal Reform | Viscount Bury | 2,192 | 29.3 | |
| Municipal Reform | Robert G Taylor | 2,172 | 29.1 | |
| Labour | George Pearce Blizard | 1,647 | 22.0 | |
| Independent | Cecil Aubrey Gwynne Manning | 1,459 | 19.5 | |
| Majority | | 525 | 7.1 | |
| Municipal Reform **hold** | | Swing | | |
| Municipal Reform **hold** | | Swing | | |

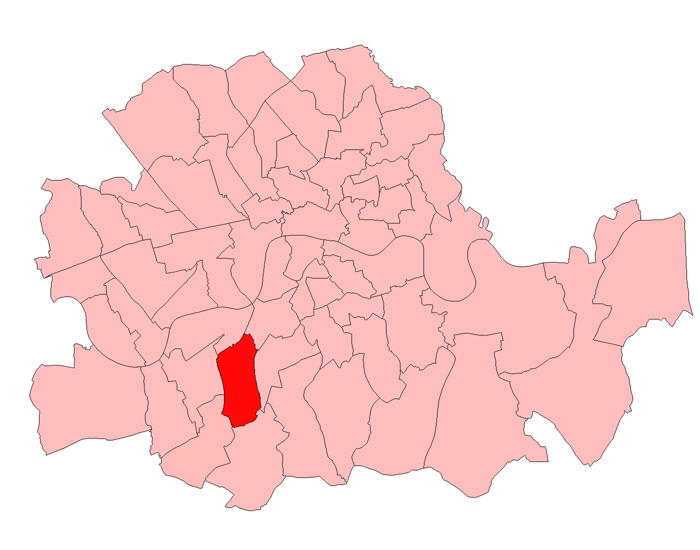
Clapham

London County Council election, 1919: Clapham
| Party | Candidate | Votes | % | ±% |
|---|---|---|---|---|
| Municipal Reform | **Sir George Bettesworth Piggott** | Unopposed | n/a | n/a |
| Municipal Reform | Herbert Francis Golds | Unopposed | n/a | n/a |
| Municipal Reform **hold** | | Swing | n/a | |
| Municipal Reform **hold** | | Swing | n/a | |

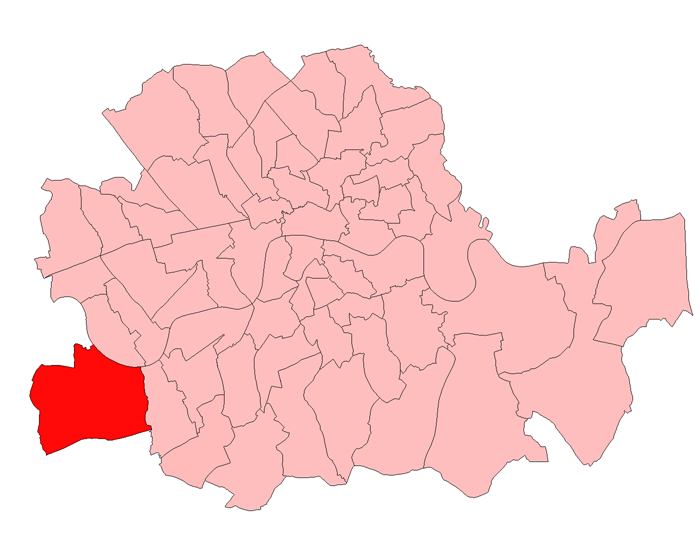
Putney

London County Council election, 1919: Putney
| Party | Candidate | Votes | % | ±% |
|---|---|---|---|---|
| Municipal Reform | **Alfred Cooper Rawson** | Unopposed | n/a | n/a |
| Municipal Reform | Charles Thomas Dickins | Unopposed | n/a | n/a |
| Municipal Reform **hold** | | Swing | n/a | |
| Municipal Reform **hold** | | Swing | n/a | |

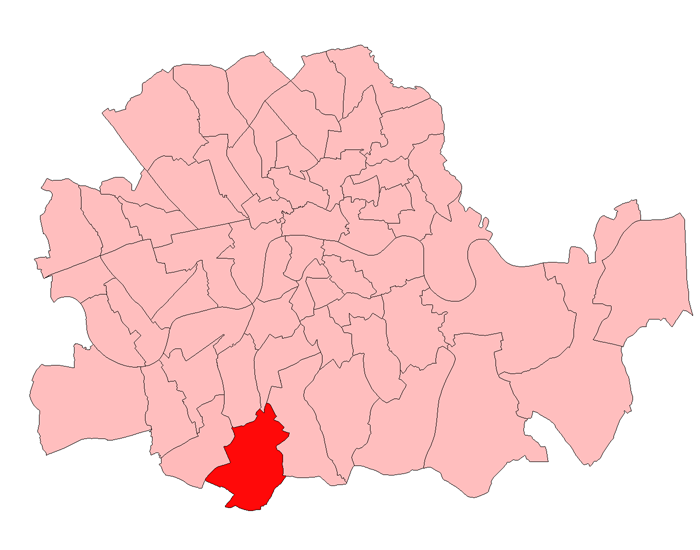
Streatham

London County Council election, 1919: Streatham
| Party | Candidate | Votes | % | ±% |
|---|---|---|---|---|
| Municipal Reform | Sir Arthur Cornelius Roberts | Unopposed | n/a | n/a |
| Municipal Reform | A. Clifford Thomas | Unopposed | n/a | n/a |
| Municipal Reform **hold** | | Swing | n/a | |
| Municipal Reform **hold** | | Swing | n/a | |

=== Westminster ===
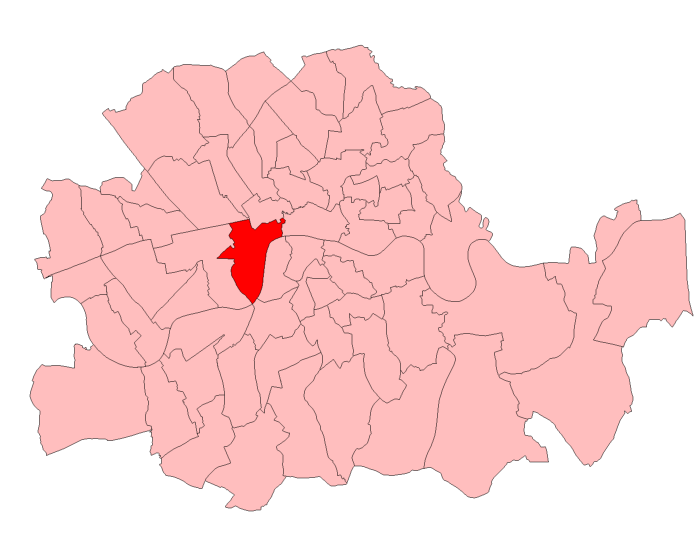
Abbey

London County Council election, 1919: Westminster Abbey
| Party | Candidate | Votes | % | ±% |
|---|---|---|---|---|
| Municipal Reform | **Reginald White Granville-Smith** | Unopposed | n/a | n/a |
| Municipal Reform | **John Maria Emilio Gatti** | Unopposed | n/a | n/a |
| Municipal Reform **hold** | | Swing | n/a | |
| Municipal Reform **hold** | | Swing | n/a | |

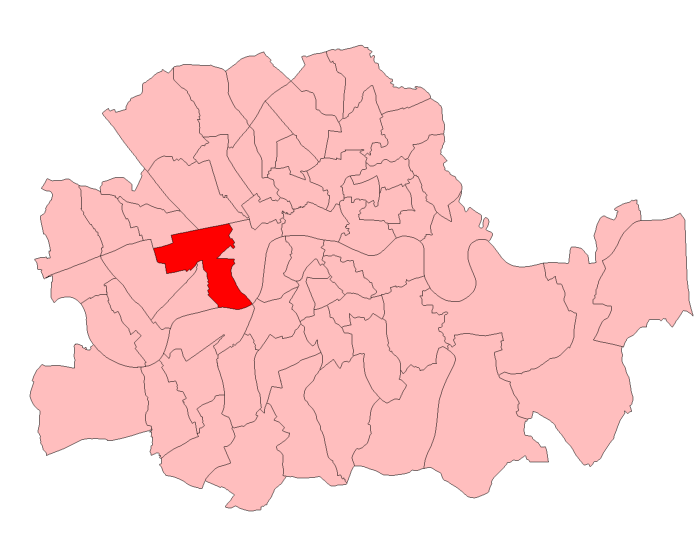
St George's

London County Council election, 1919: Westminster St George's
| Party | Candidate | Votes | % | ±% |
|---|---|---|---|---|
| Municipal Reform | **Richard Joshua Cooper** | Unopposed | n/a | n/a |
| Municipal Reform | **Hubert John Greenwood** | Unopposed | n/a | n/a |
| Municipal Reform **hold** | | Swing | n/a | |
| Municipal Reform **hold** | | Swing | n/a | |

=== Woolwich ===
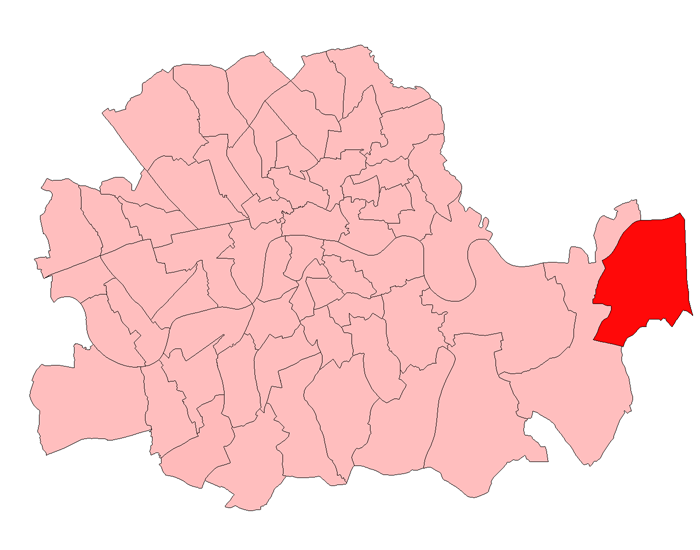
Woolwich East

London County Council election, 1919: Woolwich East
| Party | Candidate | Votes | % | ±% |
|---|---|---|---|---|
| Labour | Leslie Haden Haden-Guest | 7,788 | 34.1 | |
| Labour | Henry Snell | 7,720 | 33.8 | |
| Municipal Reform | Cyril Jacobs | 3,681 | 16.1 | |
| Municipal Reform | R. Campbell | 3,636 | 15.9 | |
| Majority | | 4,039 | 17.7 | |
| Labour **hold** | | Swing | | |
| Labour **hold** | | Swing | | |

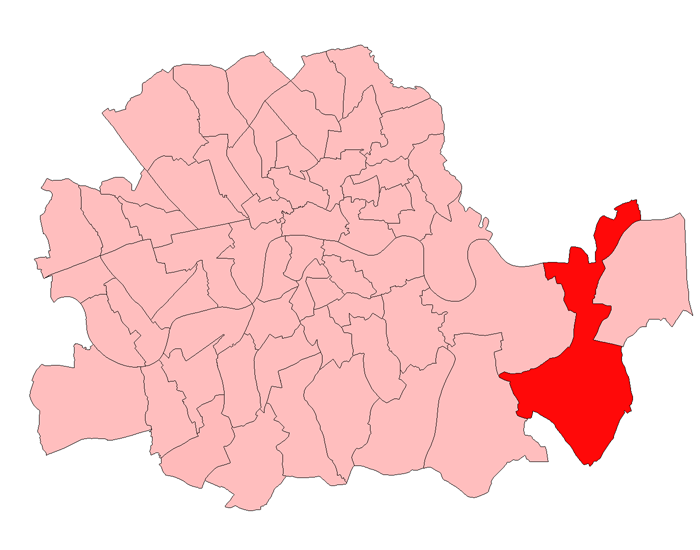
Woolwich West

London County Council election, 1919: Woolwich West
| Party | Candidate | Votes | % | ±% |
|---|---|---|---|---|
| Municipal Reform | **William James Squires** | 4,269 | 28.1 | |
| Municipal Reform | Percy Reginald Owen Abel Simner | 4,104 | 27.0 | |
| Labour | Charles H. Langham | 3,461 | 22.8 | |
| Labour | Angus Macdonald Tynemouth | 5,845 | 22.1 | |
| Majority | | 643 | 4.2 | |
| Municipal Reform **hold** | | Swing | | |
| Municipal Reform **hold** | | Swing | | |

== Aldermen ==
In addition to the 124 councillors the council consisted of 20 county aldermen. Aldermen were elected by the council, and served a six-year term. Half of the aldermanic bench were elected every three years following the triennial council election. After the elections, there were eleven Aldermanic vacancies and the following Alderman were appointed by the newly elected council;

- Louis Courtauld, Municipal Reform (defeated Councillor at Lambeth North)
- John William Gilbert, Municipal Reform (re-appointed)
- Bernard Henry Holland, Municipal Reform (re-appointed)
- Sir Cyril Jackson, Municipal Reform (former Alderman)
- Howard Willmott Liversidge, Municipal Reform (re-appointed)
- Lady St Helier, Municipal Reform (re-appointed)
- Charles James Mathew, Progressive (retiring Councillor)
- Henry Evan Auguste Cotton, Progressive (retiring Councillor)
- Henry de Rosenbach Walker, Progressive (retiring Councillor)
- Katherine Talbot Wallas, Progressive (former Alderman)
- Albert Emil Davies, Labour

== By-elections 1919–1922 ==
There were five by-elections to fill casual vacancies during the term of the tenth London County Council.

=== City of London, 1 December 1919 ===
- Cause: resignation of Sir Rowland Blades 11 November 1919

London County Council by-election, 1919: City of London
| Party | Candidate | Votes | % | ±% |
|---|---|---|---|---|
| Municipal Reform | Geoffrey Head | Unopposed | N/A | N/A |
| Municipal Reform hold | | Swing | N/A | |

=== Southwark North, 13 May 1920 ===
- Cause: resignation of Duchess of Marlborough, 27 April 1920

London County Council by-election, 1920: Southwark North
| Party | Candidate | Votes | % | ±% |
|---|---|---|---|---|
| Progressive | James Owers Devereux | 2,314 | 57.6 | |
| Labour | Herbert Stanley Morrison | 1,703 | 42.4 | |
| Majority | | 611 | 12.2 | |
| Progressive hold | | Swing | | |

=== Wandsworth, Clapham, 2 May 1921 ===
- Cause: death of Herbert Francis Golds, 9 April 1921

London County Council by-election, 1921: Clapham
| Party | Candidate | Votes | % | ±% |
|---|---|---|---|---|
| Municipal Reform | Cyril Henry M Jacobs | 7,293 | 66.7 | |
| Labour | F Thoresby | 3,638 | 33.3 | |
| Majority | | 3,655 | 33.4 | |
| Municipal Reform hold | | Swing | | |

=== Wandsworth, Streatham, 9 May 1921 ===
- Cause: resignation of A C Thomas 26 April 1921

London County Council by-election, 1921: Streatham
| Party | Candidate | Votes | % | ±% |
|---|---|---|---|---|
| Municipal Reform | Frederic Bertram Galer | Unopposed | N/A | N/A |
| Municipal Reform hold | | Swing | N/A | |

=== Battersea South, 28 June 1921 ===
- Cause: death of William Hammond, 10 June 1921

London County Council by-election, 1921: Battersea South
| Party | Candidate | Votes | % | ±% |
|---|---|---|---|---|
| Municipal Reform | William Hall | 6,358 | 66.2 | |
| Labour | Caroline Selina Ganley | 3,247 | 33.8 | |
| Majority | | 3,111 | 32.4 | |
| Municipal Reform hold | | Swing | | |

== Aldermanic vacancies filled 1919–1922 ==
There were six casual vacancies among the aldermen in the term of the tenth London County Council, which were filled as follows:

- 8 July 1919: Alfred Fowell Buxton (Municipal Reform) to serve until 1922 in place of Sir George Dashwood Taubman Goldie, resigned 1 July 1919. Buxton had previously served two aldermanic terms from 1904 to 1916.
- 24 February 1920: Arthur Acland Allen (Progressive) to serve until 1922 in place of the Hon. Oswald Partington, resigned 10 February 1920. Allen had previously served as a councillor from 1899 to 1913.
- 20 July 1920: George Sitwell Campbell Swinton (Municipal Reform) to serve until 1922 in place of Herbert James Francis Parsons, resigned 3 July 1920. Swinton had previously sat a councillor from 1901 to 1907 and as an alderman from 1907 to 1912.
- 2 November 1920: Sir Godfrey Baring (Progressive) to serve until 1922 in place of George Alexander Hardy, died 2 October 1920.
- 8 February 1921: Sir Philip Gutterez Henriques (Municipal Reform) to serve until 1925 in place of Bernard Henry Holland, resigned 25 January 1921.
- 15 March 1921: Viscount Hill (Municipal Reform) to serve until 1925 in place of Howard Willmott Liversidge, resigned 8 March 1921. Hill had previously sat as a councillor from 1910 to 1919.
