= Alfred Baker (politician) =

Labour councillor in London, England

Alfred Baker (25 September 1870 – 2 April 1943) was a British politician and solicitor.

Born in Exeter, Baker qualified as a solicitor and moved to London. He became a supporter of the labour movement, and in 1912 was appointed as legal advisor to the Labour Party, the Miners' Federation of Great Britain, and the London Labour Party.

At the 1919 London County Council election, Baker was elected in Finsbury for the Progressive Party. While, at the time, many Labour Party members stood for the Progressive Party, by the 1922 election, the two had separated, and Baker lost his seat. However, at the 1925 London County Council election, he won a seat in Hackney South as a Labour Party candidate.

Baker sat on a large number of committees, including the Thames Conservancy Board, the Port of London Authority, and as a governor of the London Hospital, Regent Street Polytechnic and Holloway School. In 1930, he served as deputy chairman of the council, and in 1931 he was knighted.

Baker was elected as Chairman of London County Council on 9 March 1943, but he died less than a month later.

Civic offices
Preceded by J. P. Blake	Chairman of London County Council; 1943	Succeeded by Richard Coppock
