= Hammersmith North (London County Council constituency) =

London County Council constituency

- Former constituency for the London County Council

Former constituency
- Created: 1919
- Abolished: 1965
- Member(s): 2 (to 1949); 3 (from 1949)
- Created from: Hammersmith

Hammersmith North was a constituency used for elections to the London County Council between 1919 and the council's abolition, in 1965. The seat shared boundaries with the UK Parliament constituency of the same name.

== Councillors ==
Year	Name	Party	Name	Party	Name	Party
1919	David Cawdron	Municipal Reform	Frank Mayle	Municipal Reform	Two seats until 1949	
1922	David Cawdron	Municipal Reform	John Beresford	Municipal Reform	Two seats until 1949	
1925	Marshall Hays	Municipal Reform	Priscilla Worsthorne	Municipal Reform	Two seats until 1949	
1928	Marshall Hays	Municipal Reform	Francis William Bowie	Labour	Two seats until 1949	
1931	Moyra Goff	Municipal Reform	Lindsay Richard Venn	Municipal Reform	Two seats until 1949	
1934	Hubert Foden-Pattinson	Labour	Thomas Henry Jones	Labour	Two seats until 1949	
1937	William Henry Church	Labour	Thomas Henry Jones	Labour	Two seats until 1949	
1946	James Bishop Bennie	Labour	Thomas Henry Jones	Labour	Two seats until 1949	
1949	Reginald James Buckingham	Labour	Jane Phillips	Labour	Edward Ernest Woods	Labour
1952	Norman Prichard	Labour	Jane Phillips	Labour	Edward Ernest Woods	Labour

== Election results ==
1919 London County Council election: Hammersmith North
Party	Candidate	Votes	%	±%
Municipal Reform	Frank Mayle	1,557	36.4	
Municipal Reform	David Cawdron	1,421	33.2	
Labour	T. Martin	1,296	30.3	
Majority		125	2.9	
Municipal Reform hold		Swing		
Municipal Reform hold		Swing		

1922 London County Council election: Hammersmith North
Party	Candidate	Votes	%	±%
Municipal Reform	David Cawdron	5,104	31.4	−1.8
Municipal Reform	John Beresford	5,066	31.2	−5.2
Labour	John Thomas Westcott	3,049	18.8	n/a
Labour	T. Martin	3,026	18.6	−11.7
Majority		2,017	12.4	+9.5
Municipal Reform hold		Swing		
Municipal Reform hold		Swing		

1925 London County Council election: Hammersmith North
Party	Candidate	Votes	%	±%
Municipal Reform	Marshall Hays	5,372		
Municipal Reform	Priscilla Worsthorne	5,100		
Labour	William Henry Church	4,157		
Labour	G. R. Bennett	4,063		
Majority				
Municipal Reform hold		Swing		
Municipal Reform hold		Swing		

1928 London County Council election: Hammersmith North
Party	Candidate	Votes	%	±%
Municipal Reform	Marshall Hays	6,330		
Labour	Francis Bowie	6,240		
Labour	Barbara Drake	6,200		
Municipal Reform	Priscilla Worsthorne	6,033		
Majority				
Labour gain from Municipal Reform		Swing		
Municipal Reform hold		Swing		

1931 London County Council election: Hammersmith North
Party	Candidate	Votes	%	±%
Municipal Reform	Lindsay Richard Venn	4,890		
Municipal Reform	Moyra Goff	4,858		
Labour	Francis Bowie	4,126		
Labour	Barbara Drake	4,089		
Communist	John Mahon	304		
Communist	W. C. Parrish	292		
Majority				
Municipal Reform gain from Labour		Swing		
Municipal Reform hold		Swing		

1934 London County Council election: Hammersmith North
Party	Candidate	Votes	%	±%
Labour	Hubert Pattinson	7,025		
Labour	Thomas Henry Jones	7,008		
Municipal Reform	Moyra Goff	4,484		
Municipal Reform	Lindsay Richard Venn	4,411		
Communist	J. Massey	270		
Communist	N. Usher	210		
Majority				
Labour gain from Municipal Reform		Swing		
Labour gain from Municipal Reform		Swing		

1937 London County Council election: Hammersmith North
Party	Candidate	Votes	%	±%
Labour	Thomas Henry Jones	9,394		
Labour	William Henry Church	9,358		
Municipal Reform	Doris Modlum	5,313		
Municipal Reform	H. N. Edwards	5,284		
Majority				
Labour hold		Swing		
Labour hold		Swing		

1946 London County Council election: Hammersmith North
Party	Candidate	Votes	%	±%
Labour	Thomas Henry Jones	7,021		
Labour	James Bishop Bennie	6,981		
Conservative	B. Martin	2,303		
Conservative	Lindsay Richard Venn	2,293		
Communist	P. C. Griffith	1,005		
Communist	P. Rosenfeld	782		
Majority				
Labour hold		Swing		
Labour hold		Swing		

1949 London County Council election: Hammersmith North
Party	Candidate	Votes	%	±%
Labour	Edward Ernest Woods	10,399		
Labour	Jane Phillips	10,370		
Labour	Reginald James Buckingham	10,216		
Conservative	Eva Tedder	6,813		
Conservative	R. Enfield	6,660		
Conservative	L. J. Yorks	6,528		
Labour win (new seat)				
Labour hold		Swing		
Labour hold		Swing		

1952 London County Council election: Hammersmith North
Party	Candidate	Votes	%	±%
Labour	Jane Phillips	13,306		
Labour	Edward Ernest Woods	12,881		
Labour	Norman Prichard	12,871		
Conservative	C. F. Edwards	5,047		
Conservative	P. M. Watson	4,933		
Conservative	D. P. Boulting	4,740		
Labour hold		Swing		
Labour hold		Swing		
Labour hold		Swing		

1955 London County Council election: Hammersmith North
Party	Candidate	Votes	%	±%
Labour	Jane Phillips	10,694		
Labour	Norman Prichard	10,667		
Labour	Edward Ernest Woods	10,502		
Conservative	A. Bowden	5,583		
Conservative	P. MacKinnon	5,540		
Conservative	D. P. Boulting	5,449		
Labour hold		Swing		
Labour hold		Swing		
Labour hold		Swing		

1958 London County Council election: Hammersmith North
Party	Candidate	Votes	%	±%
Labour	Jane Phillips	11,581		
Labour	Edward Ernest Woods	11,547		
Labour	Norman Prichard	11,508		
Conservative	J. Nugent	3,446		
Conservative	D. E. Fearn	3,438		
Conservative	A. W. Brewer	3,421		
Labour hold		Swing		
Labour hold		Swing		
Labour hold		Swing		

1961 London County Council election: Hammersmith North
Party	Candidate	Votes	%	±%
Labour	Jane Phillips	10,360		
Labour	Norman Prichard	10,096		
Labour	Edward Ernest Woods	9,888		
Conservative	M. P. Page Wood	4,825		
Conservative	B. Hawley	4,381		
Conservative	V. Kopecky	4,168		
Labour hold		Swing		
Labour hold		Swing		
Labour hold		Swing		
