= Emma Boyce =

Hackney suffragette and anti-war activist

- Born: 1867
- Died: 1929 (aged 61–62)
- Occupations: suffragette and anti-war activist
- Organization: East London Federation of Suffragettes
- Political party: Social Democratic Federation; British Socialist Party

Emma Boyce (1867–1929) was a Hackney-based suffragette and anti-war activist.

== Biography ==
Emma had been involved from 1907 in the Social Democratic Foundation (SDF) as a speaker and activist in the women's circles. She was appointed as organiser of the Women’s Education Committee but resigned in 1910, although she continued her activism in the British Socialist Party.

At the age of almost 50, she became a tireless organiser for the East London Federation of Suffragettes, working closely with Sylvia Pankhurst. At the outset of World War I, she travelled the country in her ELFS role, concentrating on Glasgow and Newcastle, but also speaking several times a week all over the country. She spoke for the suffrage movement but also against the war's conscription, advocating for freedom of choice for the working classes.

After the war, Emma was elected as a Hackney Labour Councillor from 1918 until 1923. From then until her death, she served as a life governor of the London Maternity Hospital.
