= 1934 London County Council election =

1934 local election in England

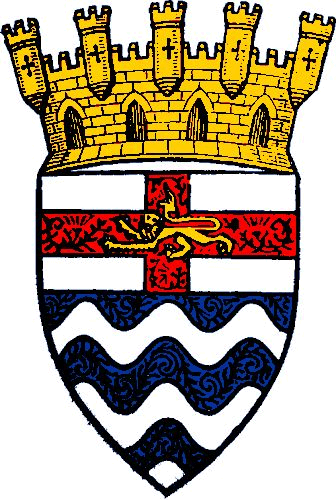
- 8 March 1934
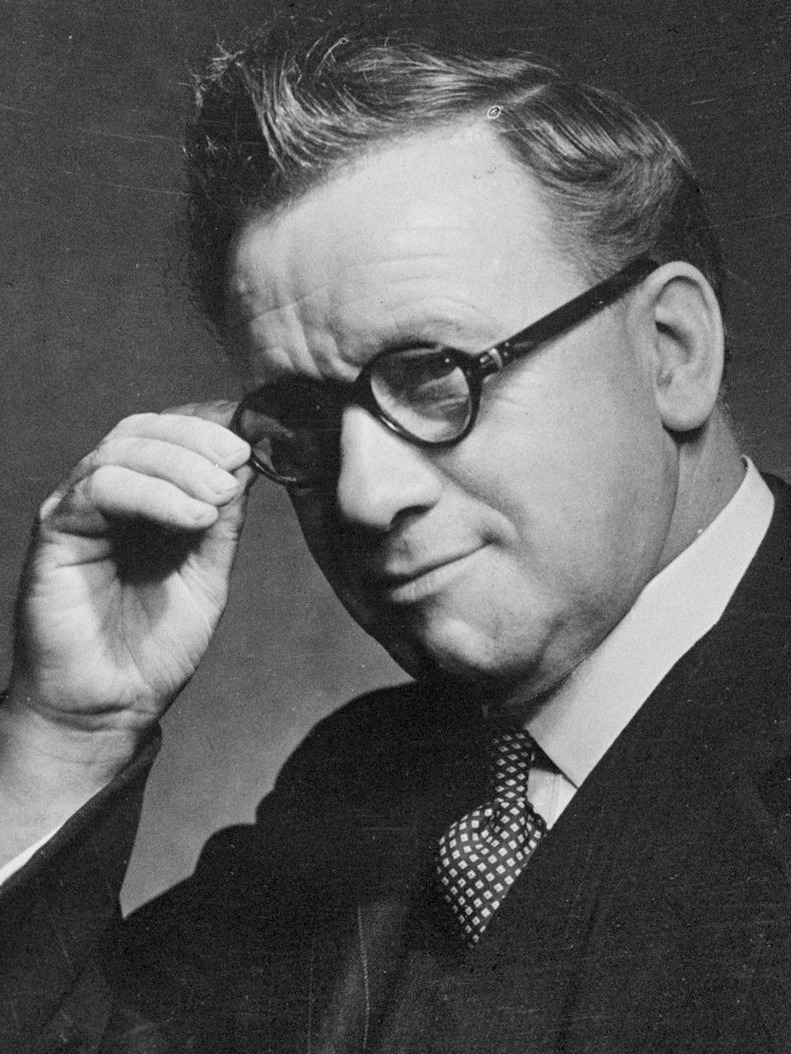
	First party	Second party
		MR
Leader	Herbert Morrison	Harold Webbe
Party	Labour	Municipal Reform
Leader since	1933	1934
Leader's seat	Alderman
Last election	35	83
Seats won	69	55
Seat change	▲34	▼28
Popular vote	341,390	291,563
Percentage	50.9%	43.5%

An election to the County Council of London took place on 8 March 1934. The council was elected by First Past the Post with each elector having two votes in the two-member seats. The Labour Party made large gains from the Municipal Reform Party, and for the first time won control of the council.

== Campaign ==
The Municipal Reform Party had run the council for 27 years, and ran on its record in government. In Finsbury, the party supported two independent "National Municipal" candidates. One of these candidates Michael Franklin belonged to the National Labour Organisation, the pro-National Government splinter party led by Ramsay MacDonald.

The Labour Party had never been the largest party on the council, and had lost ground at the previous election, in 1931. Its manifesto prioritised the construction of more housing, particularly in locations within the County of London or immediately surrounding it, and the reduction of municipal rents. It contested all seats except for those in the City of London and Kensington South, where the Municipal Reform candidates were elected unopposed, and St Marylebone where the Independent Labour Party stood instead.

The Liberal Party fielded only 26 candidates, ten of whom were not opposed by the Municipal Reform Party. The Times claimed that the party was a "spent force" in the capital, and that its best hope was to retain its six seats, which it might achieve only because of the assistance of the Municipal Reformers. Percy Harris, spokesperson for the Liberals, claimed that Labour had no chance of defeating its six sitting councillors. He proposed more housing, replanning of the London road network, and moving Covent Garden Market to the banks of the River Thames.

The Manchester Guardian described the election as difficult to predict, but noted that the Municipal Reformers were expecting to win, but with a reduced majority, while Labour believed they would win more seats and had a chance of taking control of the council. The Times predicted close contests in Battersea North, Camberwell North West, Fulham West, Greenwich, Hammersmith North, Hackney South, Kennington, Lambeth North, Mile End, Peckham, and three of the Islington constituencies.

== Result ==
Labour won a substantial victory, taking control of the council for the first time, while the Liberal Party was entirely wiped out. Among the defeated politicians was Harold Webbe, acting leader of the Municipal Reform Party. The party blamed its defeat on voter apathy.

Turnout in the election was approximately 33%.

Party	Votes			Seats	
Party	Number	%	Stood	Seats	%
Labour	341,390	50.9	116	69	55.6
Municipal Reform	291,563	43.5	106	55	44.4
Liberal	44,139		24	0	0.0
Communist	8,770		18	0	0.0
People's Party	7,340		2	0	0.0
National Municipal	6,439		2	0	0.0
Ind. Labour Party	4,509		4	0	0.0
Independent	159		1	0	0.0
