= Henry Baldwin Barton =

Lieutenant-Colonel Sir Henry Baldwin Barton (1869 – 24 June 1952) was a British Army officer and eight-times mayor of the Metropolitan Borough of Finsbury (1911–1921). Barton was the son of Henry Barton of 9 Lordship Lane, Wood Green, London. He married in 1892, Fannie, daughter of George Revell of Kensington. They had three sons and one daughter. He was knighted in 1921.
