= 1928 London County Council election =

1928 local election in England

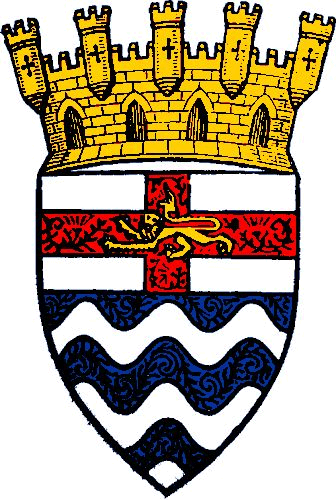
- 8 March 1928
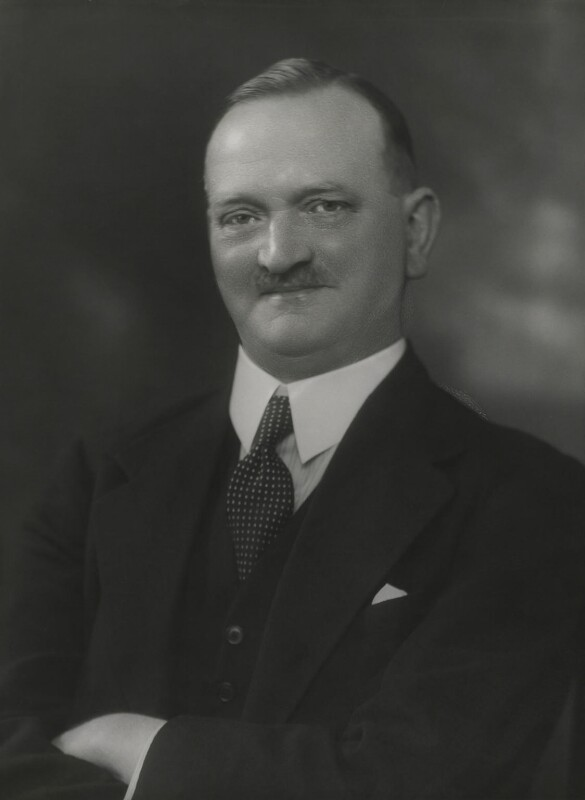

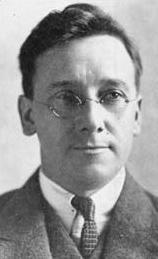

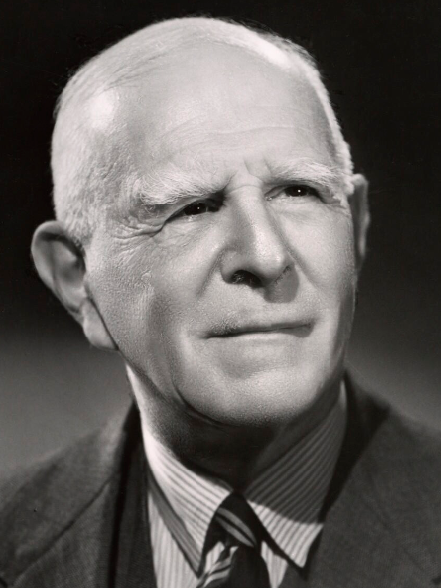
	First party	Second party	Third party
Leader	William Ray	Herbert Morrison	Percy Harris
Party	Municipal Reform	Labour	Liberal
Leader since	1925	1925
Leader's seat	Hackney Central	Woolwich East	Bethnal Green South West
Last election	83 seats	35 seats	6 seats
Seats won	77	42	5
Seat change	▼6	▲7	▼1
Popular vote	532,902	498,696	192,275
Percentage	42.7%	40.0%	15.4%

An election to the County Council of London took place on 8 March 1928. The council was elected by First Past the Post with each elector having two votes in the two-member seats. The Labour Party made slight gains at the expense of the Municipal Reform Party, which nonetheless retained a substantial majority.

== Campaign ==
The Municipal Reform Party had run the council since 1907. It campaigned on its record of providing services while keeping rates low, and proposed to maintain its current policies on education, housing, health and employment, while strengthening flood defences, in the wake of recent floods by the Thames. The party won the seats in Clapham, Kensington South, Paddington South and Westminster St George's without a contest. It hoped to make gains in Battersea North and Woolwich East. The party contested every seat on the council, the first time any party had done so.

The Labour Party manifesto prioritised clearing slums and constructing new housing, improving secondary education, and bringing all London transport under municipal control. It also proposed establishing a municipal bank, municipalising utilities, and paying trade union rates to all council staff and contractors. Its leader, Herbert Morrison, noted that the party had won 600,000 votes in London at the 1924 UK general election, but only 233,000 at the 1925 London County Council election, and described the party's task as winning over "the Labour voters who did not take the trouble to vote in 1925". The Times suggested that the party might make gains in Finsbury, and the divisions of Hackney, Islington and St Pancras.

Liberal Party candidates had previously stood as part of the Progressive Party. This alliance had foundered in recent years, particularly with the Labour Party standing its own candidates, and so from 1926 the Liberal Party stood under its own name in London. The party increased its efforts, putting forward 82 candidates. It did not entertain any hope of winning a majority on the council, but hoped to improve on the performance of the Progressive Party, and establish a stronger base to fight the next UK general election. The party's manifesto argued for expanded the area of the council to cover the whole metropolis, base rates on land values, constructing new arterial roads, building wholesale markets, and clearing slums.

In some areas, Communist Party of Great Britain (CPGB) members had recently been excluded from the Labour Party. This led the CPGB to support twenty "independent labour" candidates, who were widely seen as communists. In the two Bethnal Green seats, CPGB candidates stood under the party name. The Manchester Guardian noted that, where independent labour candidates were standing, the official Labour Party was devoting much of its time to opposing them. In one instance, the Labour Party had booked a hall for a meeting, but the independent labour candidates arrived half an hour earlier and began their own meeting, resulting in a scuffle. The candidates were not expected to win any seats.

With 332 candidates, the election saw the largest ever field standing for the council. A record sixty women contested the election.

== Result ==
The Municipal Reformers retained a large majority, despite a net loss of seven seats. The party won two seats from Labour in Battersea North, and one in Mile End.

Labour improved on the second place it had first managed in 1925. It gained a net eight seats, taking Municipal Reform seats in Finsbury, Hammersmith North, Islington South, Islington West, Kennington and St Pancras South East, and also Liberal seats in Southwark Central and Southwark North. Where the party lost seats, this was ascribed to the intervention of the independent labour and communist candidates. These candidates generally polled poorly, but they beat the official Labour candidates in Bethnal Green South West.

The Liberal Party ended up one seat down on the Progressive effort in 1925, but gained Labour seats in Bethnal Green North East, and a Municipal Reform seat in Hackney Central. The Times noted that, where Liberals faced both Labour and Municipal Reform candidates, they had generally ended up bottom of the poll, and it described the party's result as "disastrous" for the Liberals.

Despite the larger number of women standing, only 21 were elected, the same number as in 1925.

Party	Votes			Seats	
Party	Number	%	Stood	Seats	%
Municipal Reform	532,902	42.7	124	77	62.1
Labour	498,696	40.0	108	42	33.9
Liberal	192,275	15.4	82	5	4.0
Independent Labour	16,481	1.3	20	0	0.0
Communist	6,183	0.5	4	0	0.0
Independent	779	0.0	3	0	0.0
