= Balham and Tooting (London County Council constituency) =

London County Council constituency

- Former constituency for the London County Council

Former constituency
- Created: 1919
- Abolished: 1949
- Member(s): 2
- Created from: Wandsworth
- Replaced by: Clapham; Wandsworth Central

Balham and Tooting was a constituency used for elections to the London County Council between 1919 and 1949. The seat shared boundaries with the UK Parliament constituency of the same name.

== Councillors ==
Year	Name	Party	Name	Party
1919	Bevill Allen	Progressive	Henry Herman Carlisle	Progressive
1922	Malcolm Campbell-Johnston	Municipal Reform	John Ernest Perring	Municipal Reform
1934	George Doland	Municipal Reform	John Ernest Perring	Municipal Reform
1937	George Doland	Municipal Reform	Stephen Benson	Municipal Reform
1940	William Charles Bonney	Municipal Reform	Stephen Benson	Municipal Reform
1942	William Charles Bonney	Municipal Reform	Harold William Hayden	Municipal Reform
1946	Eleanor Goodrich	Labour	Albert Samuels	Labour

== Election results ==
1919 London County Council election: Balham and Tooting
Party	Candidate	Votes	%	±%
Progressive	Bevill Allen	3,149	27.1	
Progressive	Henry Herman Carlisle	3,082	26.5	
Municipal Reform	William Mellhuish	1,584	13.6	
Municipal Reform	Harry Selley	1,542	13.3	
Labour	W. Eland	1,200	10.3	
Labour	R. Champion	1,059	9.1	
Majority		1,498	12.9	
Progressive hold		Swing		
Progressive hold		Swing		

1922 London County Council election: Balham and Tooting
Party	Candidate	Votes	%	±%
Municipal Reform	John Ernest Perring	8,403	27.1	+13.5
Municipal Reform	Malcolm Campbell-Johnston	8,308	26.8	+13.8
Progressive	Bevill Allen	4,587	14.8	−12.3
Progressive	S. G. Warner	3,529	11.4	−15.1
Labour	G. Bell	3,203	10.3	−0.0
Labour	Mary Thoresby	2,943	9.5	−0.4
Majority		3,721	12.0	
Municipal Reform gain from Progressive		Swing		
Municipal Reform gain from Progressive		Swing		

1925 London County Council election: Balham and Tooting
Party	Candidate	Votes	%	±%
Municipal Reform	Malcolm Campbell-Johnston	7,041		
Municipal Reform	John Perring	6,984		
Labour	T. C. Foley	2,747		
Labour	P. McGrath	2,741		
Municipal Reform hold		Swing		
Municipal Reform hold		Swing		

1928 London County Council election: Balham and Tooting
Party	Candidate	Votes	%	±%
Municipal Reform	Malcolm Campbell-Johnston	8,169		
Municipal Reform	John Perring	8,143		
Labour	John Gregory	4,084		
Labour	Mary Carlin	3,964		
Liberal	Frederick Lees McGhee	2,614		
Liberal	G. W. Roche	2,471		
Municipal Reform hold		Swing		
Municipal Reform hold		Swing		

1931 London County Council election: Balham and Tooting
Party	Candidate	Votes	%	±%
Municipal Reform	Malcolm Campbell-Johnston	8,790		
Municipal Reform	John Perring	8,738		
Labour	Frances Stewart	3,608		
Labour	Joseph George Butler	3,591		
Municipal Reform hold		Swing		
Municipal Reform hold		Swing		

1934 London County Council election: Balham and Tooting
Party	Candidate	Votes	%	±%
Municipal Reform	George Doland	9,332		
Municipal Reform	John Perring	9,298		
Labour	John Gregory	6,241		
Labour	Annie Alice Wilson	6,106		
Municipal Reform hold		Swing		
Municipal Reform hold		Swing		

1937 London County Council election: Balham and Tooting
Party	Candidate	Votes	%	±%
Municipal Reform	George Doland	10,274		
Municipal Reform	Stephen Benson	9,773		
Labour	John Gregory	7,222		
Labour	Annie Alice Wilson	7,148		
Municipal Reform hold		Swing		
Municipal Reform hold		Swing		

1946 London County Council election: Balham and Tooting
Party	Candidate	Votes	%	±%
Labour	Eleanor Goodrich	7,936		
Labour	Albert Samuels	7,638		
Conservative	Ronald Wates	7,073		
Conservative	John Taylor Clarke	7,072		
Independent	R. V. Owen	554		
Labour gain from Municipal Reform		Swing		
Labour gain from Municipal Reform		Swing		
