= Wandsworth (London County Council constituency) =

London County Council constituency

- Former constituency for the London County Council

Former constituency
- Created: 1889
- Abolished: 1919
- Member(s): 2
- Replaced by: Balham and Tooting, Putney, Streatham and Wandsworth Central

Wandsworth was a constituency used for the London County Council elections between 1889 and 1919. The seat shared boundaries with the UK Parliament constituency of the same name. The constituency included the unpopulated Putney detached until 1 April 1901.

== Councillors ==
Year	Name	Party	Name	Party
1889	Willoughby Dickinson	Progressive	George Longstaff	Moderate
1895	Windham Wyndham-Quin	Moderate	George Longstaff	Moderate
1899	Mark James Mayhew	Progressive	George Longstaff	Moderate
1904	William Hunt	Municipal Reform	William John Lancaster	Municipal Reform
1910	William Hunt	Municipal Reform	John Lorden	Municipal Reform
1913	Edwin Evans	Municipal Reform	Cooper Rawson	Municipal Reform

== Election results ==
1889 London County Council election: Wandsworth
Party	Candidate	Votes	%	±%
Progressive	Willoughby Dickinson	3,232		
Moderate	George Longstaff	2,837		
Moderate	Charles Mortimer	2,634		
Social Democratic Federation	Joseph Richmond	927		
Moderate win (new seat)				
Progressive win (new seat)				

1892 London County Council election: Wandsworth
Party	Candidate	Votes	%	±%
Moderate	George Longstaff	4,052		
Progressive	Willoughby Dickinson	4,099		
Moderate	John Robert Heron-Maxwell	3,837		
Labour Progressive	John Ward	2,752		
Moderate hold		Swing		
Progressive hold		Swing		

1895 London County Council election: Wandsworth
Party	Candidate	Votes	%	±%
Moderate	George Longstaff	5,283		
Moderate	Windham Wyndham-Quin	5,147		
Progressive	Willoughby Dickinson	4,499		
Moderate hold		Swing		
Moderate gain from Progressive		Swing		

1898 London County Council election: Wandsworth
Party	Candidate	Votes	%	±%
Moderate	George Longstaff	6,378		
Moderate	Windham Wyndham-Quin	5,493		
Progressive	R. Steven	4,583		
Progressive	A. R. Gridley	3,954		
Moderate hold		Swing		
Moderate hold		Swing		

1901 London County Council election: Wandsworth
Party	Candidate	Votes	%	±%
Progressive	Mark James Mayhew	6,470	37.6	+9.7
Conservative	George Longstaff	5,606	32.6	−6.2
Conservative	William Hunt	5,138	29.8	−3.6
Conservative hold		Swing		
Progressive gain from Conservative		Swing	+4.7	

1904 London County Council election: Wandsworth
Party	Candidate	Votes	%	±%
Conservative	William John Lancaster	8,526		
Conservative	William Hunt	8,342		
Progressive	Robert Tweedie-Smith	6,782		
Progressive	Edward Pascoe-Williams	6,661		
Majority				
Conservative gain from Progressive		Swing		
Conservative hold		Swing		

1907 London County Council election: Wandsworth
Party	Candidate	Votes	%	±%
Municipal Reform	William John Lancaster	15,700		
Municipal Reform	William Hunt	14,585		
Progressive	F. Kellaway	9,628		
Majority				
Municipal Reform hold		Swing		
Municipal Reform hold		Swing		

1910 London County Council election: Wandsworth
Party	Candidate	Votes	%	±%
Municipal Reform	William Hunt	12,806		
Municipal Reform	John Lorden	12,665		
Progressive	E. A. Sanders	6,722		
Progressive	John Dean	6,709		
Majority				
Municipal Reform hold		Swing		
Municipal Reform hold		Swing		

1913 London County Council election: Wandsworth
Party	Candidate	Votes	%	±%
Municipal Reform	Edwin Evans	13,927		
Municipal Reform	Cooper Rawson	13,804		
Progressive	George Pearce Blizard	7,390		
Progressive	C. H. Williams	7,357		
Majority				
Municipal Reform hold		Swing		
Municipal Reform hold		Swing		
