= Stoke Newington (London County Council constituency) =

London County Council constituency

- Former constituency for the London County Council

Former constituency
- Created: 1919
- Abolished: 1949
- Member(s): 2
- Created from: Hackney North
- Replaced by: Stoke Newington and Hackney North

Stoke Newington was a constituency used for elections to the London County Council between 1919 and 1949. The seat shared boundaries with the UK Parliament constituency of the same name.

== Councillors ==
Year	Name	Party	Name	Party
1919	Edward Holton Coumbe	Municipal Reform	Walter Henry Key	Municipal Reform
1922	Edward Holton Coumbe	Municipal Reform	Archibald Albert McDonald Gordon	Municipal Reform
1937	Mark Auliff	Labour	Catherine Jefferies	Labour
1946	Mark Auliff	Labour	Reginald Pestell	Labour

== Election results ==
1919 London County Council election: Stoke Newington
Party	Candidate	Votes	%	±%
Municipal Reform	Edward Holton Coumbe	1,508	43.3	
Municipal Reform	Walter Henry Key	1,451	41.7	
Independent	George Wicks	523	15.0	
Majority		928	26.7	
Municipal Reform hold		Swing		
Municipal Reform hold		Swing		

1922 London County Council election: Stoke Newington
Party	Candidate	Votes	%	±%
Municipal Reform	Edward Holton Coumbe	4,312	42.5	−0.8
Municipal Reform	Archibald Albert McDonald Gordon	4,121	40.7	−1.0
Independent	George Wicks	1,704	16.8	+1.8
Majority		2,417	23.9	−2.8
Municipal Reform hold		Swing		
Municipal Reform hold		Swing		

1925 London County Council election: Stoke Newington
Party	Candidate	Votes	%	±%
Municipal Reform	Archibald Albert McDonald Gordon	3,585		
Municipal Reform	Edward Holton Coumbe	3,491		
Progressive	Hamilton Lenney Hibbard	1,937		
Labour	Duncan Carmichael	1,134		
Labour	E. R. Pountney	1,052		
Majority				
Municipal Reform hold		Swing		
Municipal Reform hold		Swing		

1928 London County Council election: Stoke Newington
Party	Candidate	Votes	%	±%
Municipal Reform	Archibald Albert McDonald Gordon	3,601		
Municipal Reform	Edward Holton Coumbe	3,479		
Liberal	Hamilton Lenney Hibbard	2,831		
Liberal	Gerald Spence Tetley	2,700		
Labour	A. Watson	1,637		
Labour	F. L. Kerran	1,599		
Majority				
Municipal Reform hold		Swing		
Municipal Reform hold		Swing		

1931 London County Council election: Stoke Newington
Party	Candidate	Votes	%	±%
Municipal Reform	Edward Holton Coumbe	3,699		
Municipal Reform	Archibald Albert McDonald Gordon	3,626		
Labour	A. Watson	2,055		
Liberal	Iolo Aneurin Williams	1,212		
Liberal	A. Herbert	1,181		
Majority				
Municipal Reform hold		Swing		
Municipal Reform hold		Swing		

1934 London County Council election: Stoke Newington
Party	Candidate	Votes	%	±%
Municipal Reform	Edward Holton Coumbe	3,574		
Municipal Reform	Archibald Albert McDonald Gordon	3,548		
Labour	E. Pearce	3,127		
Labour	I. Davis	3,039		
Liberal	H. C. Cohen	970		
Liberal	Ursula Warren	934		
Majority				
Municipal Reform hold		Swing		
Municipal Reform hold		Swing		

1937 London County Council election: Stoke Newington
Party	Candidate	Votes	%	±%
Labour	Mark Auliff	4,937		
Labour	Catherine Jefferies	4,917		
Municipal Reform	Archibald Albert McDonald Gordon	4,655		
Municipal Reform	Edward Holton Coumbe	4,650		
Liberal	J. H. Black	586		
Liberal	A. L. Hamwee	502		
Majority				
Labour gain from Municipal Reform		Swing		
Labour gain from Municipal Reform		Swing		

1946 London County Council election: Stoke Newington
Party	Candidate	Votes	%	±%
Labour	Reginald Pestell	3,706		
Labour	Mark Auliff	3,666		
Conservative	E. Norvall	2,424		
Conservative	D. Barnes	2,418		
Majority				
Labour hold		Swing		
Labour hold		Swing		
