= Wandsworth Central (London County Council constituency) =

London County Council constituency

- Former constituency for the London County Council

Former constituency
- Created: 1919
- Abolished: 1965
- Member(s): 2 (to 1949); 3 (from 1949)
- Created from: Wandsworth

Wandsworth Central was a constituency used for elections to the London County Council between 1919 and the council's abolition, in 1965. The seat shared boundaries with the UK Parliament constituency of the same name.

== Councillors ==
Year	Name	Party	Name	Party	Name	Party
1919	Walter Keppel	Municipal Reform	Robert Taylor	Municipal Reform	Two seats until 1949	
1922	Charles Paston Crane	Municipal Reform	Robert Taylor	Municipal Reform	Two seats until 1949	
1925	Clyde Wilson	Municipal Reform	Robert Taylor	Municipal Reform	Two seats until 1949	
1931	Clyde Wilson	Municipal Reform	Edward Martin	Municipal Reform	Two seats until 1949	
1935	George Currie	Labour	Edward Martin	Municipal Reform	Two seats until 1949	
1937	George Currie	Labour	Eleanor Nathan	Labour	Two seats until 1949	
1940	John William Bowen	Labour	Eleanor Nathan	Labour	Two seats until 1949	
1949	Irene Burnett	Conservative	John Taylor Clarke	Conservative	Ronald Wates	Conservative
1952	George Edwards	Labour	Eleanor Goodrich	Labour	Annie Alice Wilson	Labour
1955	Martin Bond	Conservative	Lance Cocker	Conservative	Alison Tennant	Conservative
1958	David Kerr	Labour	George Frederick Rowe	Labour	Hugh Sutherland	Labour
1962	David Kerr	Labour	George Frederick Rowe	Labour	Joan Lestor	Labour

== Election results ==
1919 London County Council election: Wandsworth Central
Party	Candidate	Votes	%	±%
Municipal Reform	Walter Keppel	2,192	29.3	
Municipal Reform	Robert Taylor	2,172	29.1	
Labour	George Pearce Blizard	1,647	22.0	
Independent	Cecil Manning	1,459	19.5	
Majority		525	7.1	
Municipal Reform hold		Swing		
Municipal Reform hold		Swing		

1922 London County Council election: Wandsworth Central
Party	Candidate	Votes	%	±%
Municipal Reform	Robert Taylor	6,524	32.6	+3.5
Municipal Reform	Charles Paston Crane	6,514	32.6	+3.3
Labour	George Pearce Blizard	3,511	17.6	−4.6
Labour	W. J. Humphreys	3,447	17.2	n/a
Majority		3,003	15.0	
Municipal Reform hold		Swing		
Municipal Reform hold		Swing		

1925 London County Council election: Wandsworth Central
Party	Candidate	Votes	%	±%
Municipal Reform	Robert Taylor	4,537		
Municipal Reform	Clyde Wilson	4,484		
Labour	Cook	2,208		
Labour	H. G. Matthews	2,201		
Progressive	A. J. Payne	1,509		
Progressive	Phillips Welch	1,383		
Majority				
Municipal Reform hold		Swing		
Municipal Reform hold		Swing		

1928 London County Council election: Wandsworth Central
Party	Candidate	Votes	%	±%
Municipal Reform	Robert Grosvenor Taylor	4,440		
Municipal Reform	Clyde Wilson	4,354		
Labour	H. G. Matthews	2,976		
Labour	A. Johnson	2,936		
Liberal	Henry Robert Spink	2,653		
Liberal	E. H. Hobday	2,333		
Majority				
Municipal Reform hold		Swing		
Municipal Reform hold		Swing		

1931 London County Council election: Wandsworth Central
Party	Candidate	Votes	%	±%
Municipal Reform	Edward Martin	5,660		
Municipal Reform	Clyde Wilson	5,639		
Labour	F. B. Alcock	2,927		
Labour	M. Godfrey	2,884		
Majority				
Municipal Reform hold		Swing		
Municipal Reform hold		Swing		

1934 London County Council election: Wandsworth Central
Party	Candidate	Votes	%	±%
Municipal Reform	Clyde Wilson	5,433		
Municipal Reform	Edward Martin	5,316		
Labour	M. Rosette	4,287		
Labour	H. P. Wilson	4,121		
Majority				
Municipal Reform hold		Swing		
Municipal Reform hold		Swing		

Wandsworth Central by-election, 1935
Party	Candidate	Votes	%	±%
Labour	George Currie	4,662		
Municipal Reform	Evans Rees	4,429		
Majority		223		
Labour gain from Municipal Reform		Swing		

1937 London County Council election: Wandsworth Central
Party	Candidate	Votes	%	±%
Labour	George Currie	8,007		
Labour	Eleanor Nathan	7,958		
Municipal Reform	Edward Martin	7,133		
Municipal Reform	J. M. Oakey	7,108		
Majority				
Labour gain from Municipal Reform		Swing		
Labour gain from Municipal Reform		Swing		

1946 London County Council election: Wandsworth Central
Party	Candidate	Votes	%	±%
Labour	Eleanor Nathan	7,038		
Labour	John William Bowen	6,983		
Conservative	Thomas Fairfax	4,135		
Municipal Reform	D. Croft	4,109		
Majority				
Labour hold		Swing		
Labour hold		Swing		

1949 London County Council election: Wandsworth Central
Party	Candidate	Votes	%	±%
Conservative	Ronald Wates	18,309		
Conservative	Irene Burnett	18,185		
Conservative	John Taylor Clarke	18,053		
Labour	Eleanor Goodrich	15,595		
Labour	John William Bowen	15,259		
Labour	George Frederick Rowe	14,992		
Conservative win (new seat)				
Conservative gain from Labour		Swing		
Conservative gain from Labour		Swing		

1952 London County Council election: Wandsworth Central
Party	Candidate	Votes	%	±%
Labour	Eleanor Goodrich	18,112		
Labour	Annie Alice Wilson	17,576		
Labour	George Edwards	17,574		
Conservative	J. Lowe	16,845		
Conservative	Irene Burnett	16,709		
Conservative	S. J. Bull	16,672		
Labour gain from Conservative		Swing		
Labour gain from Conservative		Swing		
Labour gain from Conservative		Swing		

1955 London County Council election: Wandsworth Central
Party	Candidate	Votes	%	±%
Conservative	Lance Cocker	14,359		
Conservative	Martin Bond	14,299		
Conservative	Alison Tennant	14,131		
Labour	Eleanor Goodrich	13,367		
Labour	George Edwards	13,344		
Labour	Annie Alice Wilson	12,864		
Independent	A. F. Perry	735		
Conservative gain from Labour		Swing		
Conservative gain from Labour		Swing		
Conservative gain from Labour		Swing		

1958 London County Council election: Wandsworth Central
Party	Candidate	Votes	%	±%
Labour	David Kerr	16,410		
Labour	George Frederick Rowe	16,000		
Labour	Hugh Sutherland	15,991		
Conservative	Alison Tennant	10,667		
Conservative	Martin Bond	10,614		
Conservative	Lance Cocker	10,527		
Labour gain from Conservative		Swing		
Labour gain from Conservative		Swing		
Labour gain from Conservative		Swing		

1961 London County Council election: Wandsworth Central
Party	Candidate	Votes	%	±%
Labour	David Kerr	14,102		
Labour	George Frederick Rowe	13,470		
Labour	Hugh Sutherland	13,290		
Conservative	K. F. Creighton	12,743		
Conservative	D. J. Grant	12,688		
Conservative	T. J. Mosley	12,547		
Liberal	Ronald Arthur Locke	2,490		
Liberal	A. Elsbury	2,375		
Liberal	C. C. Burns	2,075		
Labour hold		Swing		
Labour hold		Swing		
Labour hold		Swing		
