= Eleanor Goodrich =

British politician and activist

Eleanor Kathleen Goodrich OBE (1888 – 1988) was a British politician and activist.

Born in Clapton, as Eleanor Kathleen Harslett, her father was a stage manager, and both of her parents were close friends with Herbert Morrison. She became a suffragette and a teacher, active in the National Union of Women Teachers.

In 1934, Goodrich was elected for the Labour Party to the council of the Metropolitan Borough of Wandsworth, one of the first party members to win a seat in the borough. She won a seat in Balham and Tooting at the 1946 London County Council election. From 1947 until 1949, she also served as Mayor of Wandsworth, the first woman from the Labour Party to hold the post.

The Balham and Tooting constituency was abolished for the 1949 London County Council election, and Goodrich instead stood unsuccessfully in Wandsworth Central. Despite this defeat, she was appointed to serve on the council's education committee. In the 1951 New Year Honours, she was made an Officer of the Order of the British Empire.

Goodrich contested Wandsworth Central again at the 1952 London County Council election, winning a seat, but she lost it again in 1955. She was instead appointed as an alderman, and in 1958/1959, served as vice-chair of the council.

In the late 1960s, Goodrich helped establish the Putney Arts Theatre in its long-term venue. She died in 1988.
