= Stoke Newington and Hackney North (London County Council constituency) =

London County Council constituency

- Former constituency for the London County Council

Former constituency
- Created: 1949
- Abolished: 1965
- Member(s): 3
- Created from: Hackney North and Stoke Newington

Stoke Newington and Hackney North was a constituency used for elections to the London County Council between 1949 and the council's abolition, in 1965. The seat shared boundaries with the UK Parliament constituency of the same name.

== Councillors ==
Year	Name	Party	Name	Party	Name	Party
1949	Mark Auliff	Labour	Molly Bolton	Labour	Henry Norris	Labour
1952	George Edward Hayes	Labour	Albert Samuels	Labour	Neville Sandelson	Labour
1955	Helen Bentwich	Labour	Albert Samuels	Labour	Neville Sandelson	Labour
1958	Hugh Jenkins	Labour	Albert Samuels	Labour	Barry Payton	Labour
1961	Hugh Jenkins	Labour	David Pitt	Labour	Barry Payton	Labour

== Election results ==
1949 London County Council election: Stoke Newington and Hackney North
Party	Candidate	Votes	%	±%
Labour	Molly Bolton	12,469		
Labour	Mark Auliff	12,256		
Labour	Henry Norris	11,435		
Conservative	D. M. Barnes	11,268		
Conservative	A. C. M. Hopkins	10,104		
Conservative	M. A. Yardley	9,948		
Liberal	W. G. Wingate	5,111		
Liberal	John Peter James Ellis	4,325		
Liberal	David Goldblatt	4,300		

1952 London County Council election: Stoke Newington and Hackney North
Party	Candidate	Votes	%	±%
Labour	George Edward Hayes	19,109		
Labour	Albert Samuels	19,003		
Labour	Neville Sandelson	18,777		
Conservative	P. Brooks	8,413		
Conservative	S. Loweth	8,349		
Conservative	G. Finsberg	8,283		
Liberal	Philip Phillips	1,768		
Liberal	R. B. James	1,232		
Liberal	R. B. High	1,189		
Labour hold		Swing		

1955 London County Council election: Stoke Newington and Hackney North
Party	Candidate	Votes	%	±%
Labour	Albert Samuels	9,678		
Labour	Helen Bentwich	9,639		
Labour	Neville Sandelson	9,575		
Conservative	Julian Critchley	5,265		
Conservative	C. A. Harrison	5,236		
Conservative	E. D. Worwood	5,201		
Communist	H. Franklin	923		
Communist	Aubrey Morris	860		
Communist	T. Keene	786		
Liberal	Philip Phillips	690		
Liberal	H. Bloch	681		
Liberal	Benjamin Ashkenazi	617		
Labour hold		Swing		

1958 London County Council election: Stoke Newington and Hackney North
Party	Candidate	Votes	%	±%
Labour	Albert Samuels	9,317		
Labour	Hugh Jenkins	9,045		
Labour	Barry Payton	9,014		
Conservative	D. Yelland	2,291		
Conservative	F. B. Hughes	2,235		
Conservative	A. J. Barnett	2,097		
Liberal	C. Pater	2,018		
Liberal	D. Hart	1,975		
Liberal	B. Osen	1,844		
Labour hold		Swing		

1961 London County Council election: Stoke Newington and Hackney North
Party	Candidate	Votes	%	±%
Labour	Barry Payton	9,076		
Labour	Hugh Jenkins	9,054		
Labour	David Pitt	8,905		
Conservative	W. J. Hawkins	4,158		
Conservative	J. R. Boast	4,064		
Conservative	D. Yelland	3,869		
Liberal	C. Pater	2,306		
Liberal	S. Gresham	2,244		
Liberal	S. Leff	2,004		
Labour hold		Swing		
