= Mary Carlin =

Mary Carlin (13 August 1873 – 5 April 1939) was a British trade unionist.

Born in Eastwood, Nottinghamshire, Carlin became a trade union activist. In 1916, she was one of the first women to become a national organiser, for the Dock, Wharf, Riverside and General Labourers' Union. During World War I, she served on the Women's Advisory Council of the Ministry of Munitions, and a committee of inquiry into the Women's Army Auxiliary Corps.

After the war, Carlin became active in the No More War Movement, organising a large demonstration in 1922. She was also prominent in the Labour Party, being elected to its National Executive Committee in 1924 and serving for many years. She stood unsuccessfully in Balham and Tooting at the 1928 London County Council election. In 1930, she was selected as the party's Prospective Parliamentary Candidate for Westminster Abbey, though she ultimately did not stand.

The dock union became part of the Transport and General Workers' Union, and Carlin became its National Women's Officer and the secretary of its Women's Guild. She also served on the Court of Referees as a trade union representative. She retired in the late 1930s and died suddenly in 1939.
