= Marks Ripka =

Marks Donald Ripka (12 June 1903 – 4 March 1976) was a Polish-British medical doctor and politician.

Born part of Poland then under the control of the Russian Empire to a Jewish family as Majer Rybka, he moved with his family to the Spitalfields area of London at an early age. In 1931, he was naturalised as a British citizen, by which time he was using the name "Marks Ripka".

Ripka studied medicine, qualifying in 1933, and became known for his willingness to prescribe heroin to addicts. Initially, this attracted attention, but did not cause him difficulties, and he became active in the Socialist Medical Association and the Medical Services Guild. He also joined the Labour Party, and at the 1946 London County Council election, he was elected in St Pancras South West, serving a single three-year term.

By 1951, concerns about Ripka's prescription of heroin were taken to the Home Office. While it decided that the prescription of heroin to addicts was a complex area, of unclear legality, one of Ripka's patients had sent their prescribed heroin to a friend in Malta. Ripka pleaded guilty to aiding the unlawful possession of a proscribed substance, and agreed not to accept any more addicts as patients.
