= St Pancras South West (London County Council constituency) =

London County Council constituency

- Former constituency for the London County Council

Former constituency
- Created: 1919
- Abolished: 1949
- Member(s): 2
- Created from: St Pancras South and St Pancras West
- Replaced by: Holborn and St Pancras South and St Pancras North

St Pancras South West was a constituency used for elections to the London County Council between 1919 and 1949. The seat shared boundaries with the UK Parliament constituency of the same name.

== Councillors ==
Year	Name	Party	Name	Party
1919	Auberon Claud Hegan Kennard	Municipal Reform	Charles William Matthews	Municipal Reform
1925	Adrian Moreing	Municipal Reform	Charles William Matthews	Municipal Reform
1928	Adrian Moreing	Municipal Reform	William Samuel Mercer	Municipal Reform
1931	Adrian Moreing	Municipal Reform	Maurice Matthews	Municipal Reform
1934	Albert Samuels	Labour	Maurice Matthews	Municipal Reform
1937	Monica Felton	Labour	Maurice Orbach	Labour
1946	Evelyn Denington	Labour	Marks Ripka	Labour

== Election results ==
1919 London County Council election: St Pancras South West
Party	Candidate	Votes	%	±%
Municipal Reform	Auberon Claud Hegan Kennard	Unopposed		
Municipal Reform	Charles William Matthews	Unopposed		
Majority				
Municipal Reform hold		Swing		
Municipal Reform hold		Swing		

1922 London County Council election: St Pancras South West
Party	Candidate	Votes	%	±%
Municipal Reform	Auberon Claud Hegan Kennard	4,456	26.9	
Municipal Reform	Charles William Matthews	4,464	26.9	
Labour	Henry Montague Tibbles	2,036	12.3	
Labour	Albert Inkpin	1,992	12.0	
Progressive	Ernest Devan Wetton	1,814	10.9	
Progressive	R. E. Allen	1,810	10.9	
Majority		2,428	14.6	
Municipal Reform hold		Swing		
Municipal Reform hold		Swing		

1925 London County Council election: St Pancras South West
Party	Candidate	Votes	%	±%
Municipal Reform	Charles William Matthews	3,240		
Municipal Reform	Adrian Moreing	3,151		
Labour	A. E. Smith	2,877		
Labour	Maurice Orbach	2,818		
Progressive	William Lloyd Taylor	1,095		
Progressive	E. Alliston	1,021		
Majority				
Municipal Reform hold		Swing		
Municipal Reform hold		Swing		

1928 London County Council election: St Pancras South West
Party	Candidate	Votes	%	±%
Municipal Reform	William Samuel Mercer	3,554		
Municipal Reform	Adrian Moreing	3,509		
Labour	Henry Montague Tibbles	3,387		
Labour	W. R. Jones	3,351		
Liberal	M. Thomson	1,416		
Liberal	J. A. Clark	1,398		
Majority				
Municipal Reform hold		Swing		
Municipal Reform hold		Swing		

1931 London County Council election: St Pancras South West
Party	Candidate	Votes	%	±%
Municipal Reform	Maurice Matthews	4,031		
Municipal Reform	Adrian Moreing	3,947		
Labour	Frank Combes	2,459		
Labour	S. Presbury	2,374		
Majority				
Municipal Reform hold		Swing		
Municipal Reform hold		Swing		

1934 London County Council election: St Pancras South West
Party	Candidate	Votes	%	±%
Labour	Albert Samuels	4,210		
Municipal Reform	Maurice Matthews	4,204		
Labour	Helen Bentwich	4,132		
Municipal Reform	H. E. Capes	4,048		
Majority				
Labour gain from Municipal Reform		Swing		
Municipal Reform hold		Swing		

1937 London County Council election: St Pancras South West
Party	Candidate	Votes	%	±%
Labour	Monica Felton	6,260		
Labour	Maurice Orbach	6,202		
Municipal Reform	Maurice Matthews	5,595		
Municipal Reform	William Timothy Donovan	5,558		
Majority				
Labour gain from Municipal Reform		Swing		
Labour hold		Swing		

1946 London County Council election: St Pancras South West
Party	Candidate	Votes	%	±%
Labour	Marks Ripka	4,378		
Labour	Evelyn Denington	4,371		
Conservative	E. P. Hubbard	2,798		
Conservative	B. Sunley	2,769		
Majority				
Labour hold		Swing		
Labour hold		Swing		
