= 1922 London County Council election =

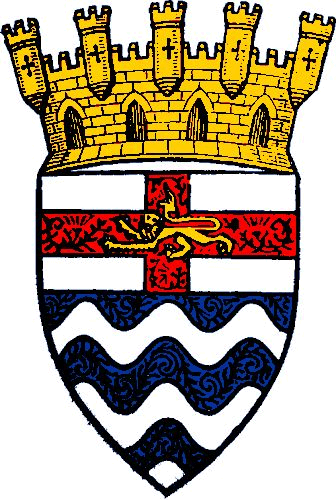
- 2 March 1922

124 Council Seats 63 seats needed for a majority

	First party	Second party	Third party
Leader	George Hume	Scott Lidgett	Harry Gosling
Party	Municipal Reform	Progressive	Labour
Leader since	1918	1918	1920
Leader's seat	Greenwich	Rotherhithe	Kennington
Last election	68 seats	40 seats	15 seats
Seats won	82	26	16
Seat change	▲14	▼14	▲1
Popular vote	557,210	182,512	385,292
Percentage	49.2%	16.1%	34.1%
Swing	▲10.2%	▼7.3%	▼0.6%
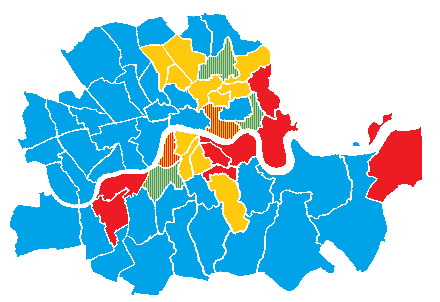
- Colours denote the winning party.

An election to the County Council of London took place on 2 March 1922. It was the eleventh triennial election of the whole council. There were sixty dual member constituencies and one four member constituency, making a total of 124 seats. The council was elected by First Past the Post with each elector having two votes in the dual member seats.

== National government background ==
The Prime Minister of the day was the Liberal David Lloyd George who led a Coalition Government that included the Unionist Party and those Liberals and Socialists who had broken from the main Liberal and Labour parties who sat in opposition. The Coalition was numerically dominated by the Unionists who were still 7 months away from overthrowing Lloyd George. The Coalition had been losing parliamentary seats in by-elections to both opposition parties including two in London to Labour; at 1921 Southwark South East by-election and during the council election campaign at 1922 Camberwell North by-election where one of the incumbent London Labour councillors Charles Ammon was elected to parliament on 20 February 1922. Ten days later, the electors of Camberwell North re-elected him to the County Council.

== London Council background ==

Although the Municipal Reform Party had an overall majority, in line with national politics, they decided late in 1917 to form a war-time coalition to mirror the national government. Some Progressive Party members were offered chairmanships of committees. This coalition had continued after the war ended, but both parties, along with the Labour Party, fought the 1922 elections on separate platforms.

== Candidates ==
The leader of the Municipal Reform Party did not defend his seat, but was expected to remain a member when the new council appointed its new aldermen. There was no county wide electoral agreements between any of the parties, though clearly there had been some locally agreed situations. There were very few constituencies where all three parties stood two candidates. In the past, the Progressive Party had encompassed the Labour Party, with candidates running in harness. That situation had recently ended when former Progressive Party councillor Harry Gosling became leader of the Labour Party. In its place there were a few Progressive candidates running in harness with Municipal Reform candidates. Among Labour's candidates were members of the recently formed Communist Party, such as Albert Inkpin.

== Outcome ==
Labour suffered a setback when their Leader, Harry Gosling was defeated at Kennington, thanks to an electoral arrangement between the Progressives and the Municipal Reformers, although he regained the seat at a by-election a month later. Labour had mixed results, managing to more or less hold their own. The leader of the Progressive Party, John Scott Lidgett, was also unseated at Rotherhithe, although he was able to remain a member of the council when he was appointed an alderman. The big winners were the Municipal Reform Party, who made a number of gains at the expense of the Progressives.

London County Council election, 1922
Party	Seats	Seats %	+/-	Votes	Votes %	+/-	Candidates
Municipal Reform	82	66.1%	+14	557,210	49.2%	+10.2%	98
Progressive	26	21.0%	-14	182,512	16.1%	-7.3%	50
Labour	16	12.9%	+1	385,292	34.1%	-0.6	96
Independent	0	0.0%	-1	6,396	0.6%	-2.2%	5

== Constituency results ==
- Incumbent Councillors shown in bold.

=== Battersea ===
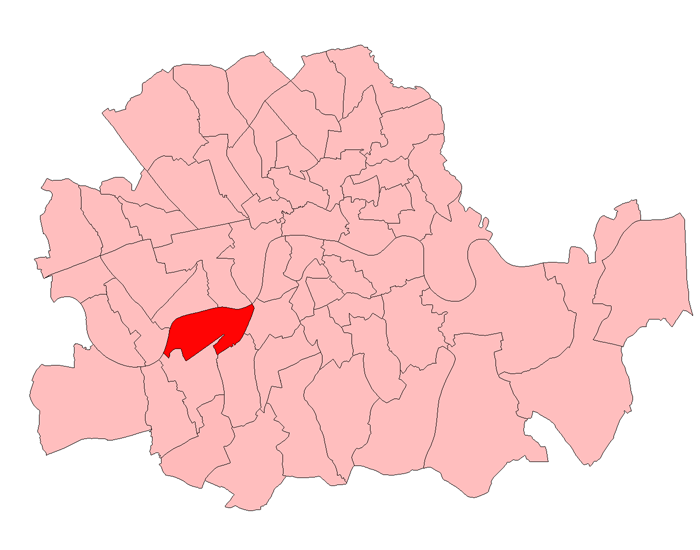
Battersea North

London County Council election, 1922: Battersea North
Party	Candidate	Votes	%	±%
Labour	**Joseph George Butler**	6,585	29.3%	
Labour	**Alfred Augustus Watts**	6,557	29.1%	
Municipal Reform	W Watts	4,686	20.8%	
Municipal Reform	Charles James Allpass	4,669	20.8%	
Labour **hold**		Swing		
Labour **hold**		Swing		

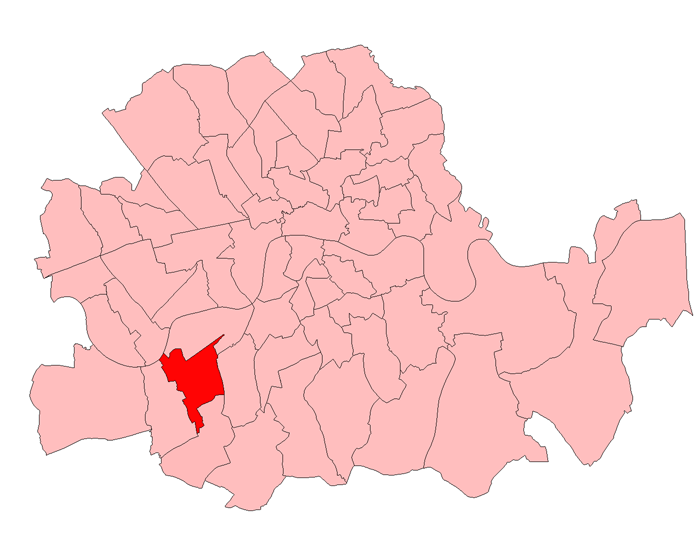
Battersea South

London County Council election, 1922: Battersea South
Party	Candidate	Votes	%	±%
Municipal Reform	**Edwin Evans**	10,424	32.0%	
Municipal Reform	**William Hall**	10,394	31.9%	
Labour	Caroline Selina Ganley	5,872	18.0%	
Labour	Rev. Alfred George Prichard	5,843	18.0%	
Municipal Reform **hold**		Swing		
Municipal Reform **hold**		Swing		

=== Bermondsey ===
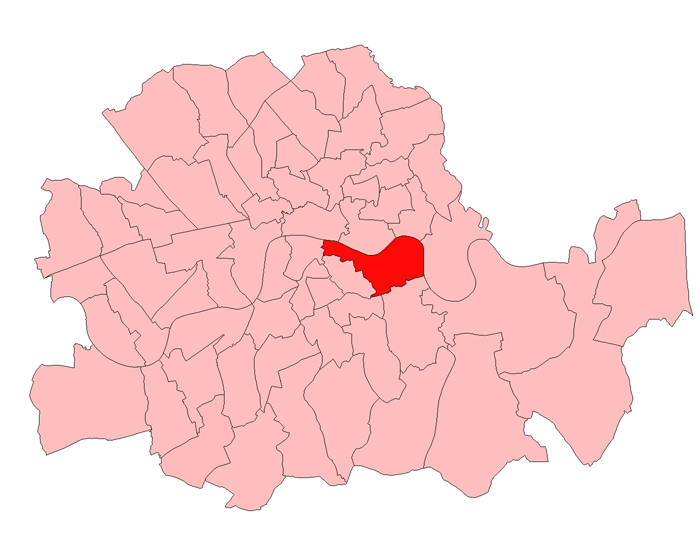
Rotherhithe

London County Council election, 1922: Rotherhithe
Party	Candidate	Votes	%	±%
Labour	Dr. Allan Randle	5,457		
Labour	William John Webb	5,296		
Progressive	**Rev. John Scott Lidgett**	3,807		
Progressive	Arthur Acland Allen	3,604		
Majority				
Labour **gain** from Progressive		Swing		
Labour **gain** from Progressive		Swing		

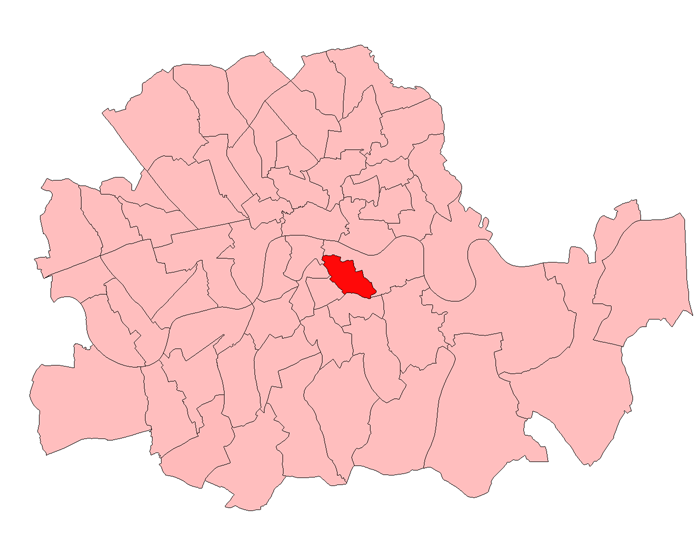
Bermondsey West

London County Council election, 1922: Bermondsey West
Party	Candidate	Votes	%	±%
Labour	Eveline Mary Lowe	4,113		
Labour	Frederick Charles Langton	4,091		
Progressive	**Harold James Glanville**	3,277		
Progressive	Samuel Lithgow	2,671		
Independent	Mrs. Jessie E Scriven	2,339		
Majority				
Labour **gain** from Progressive		Swing		
Labour **gain** from Progressive		Swing		

=== Bethnal Green ===
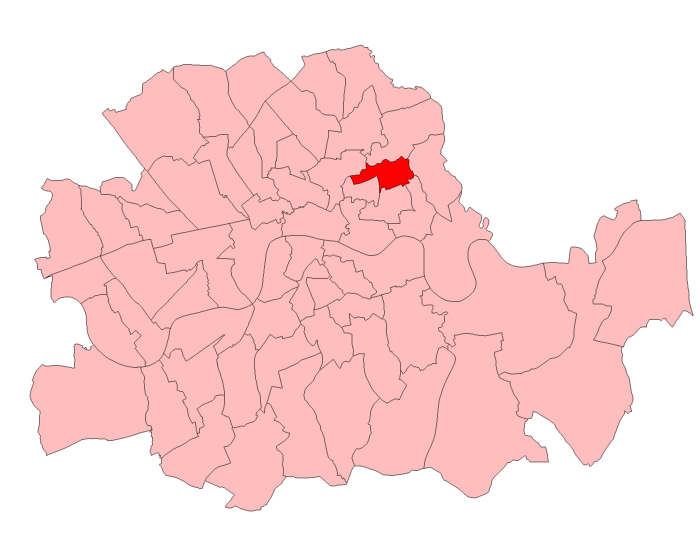
Bethnal Green N E

London County Council election, 1922: Bethnal Green North East
Party	Candidate	Votes	%	±%
Progressive	Sir Edgar Bonham-Carter	3,522		n/a
Progressive	William Shadforth	3,518		n/a
Labour	B Gray	3,295		n/a
Labour	George Belt	3,154		n/a
Majority				
Progressive **hold**		Swing	n/a	
Progressive **hold**		Swing	n/a	

Headlam

London County Council election, 1922: Bethnal Green South West
Party	Candidate	Votes	%	±%
Progressive	**Rev. Stewart Duckworth Headlam**	3,178		
Progressive	**Percy Alfred Harris**	3,049		
Labour	Joseph James Vaughan	2,244		
Labour	J Valentine	2,148		
Majority				
Progressive **hold**		Swing		
Progressive **hold**		Swing		

=== Camberwell ===
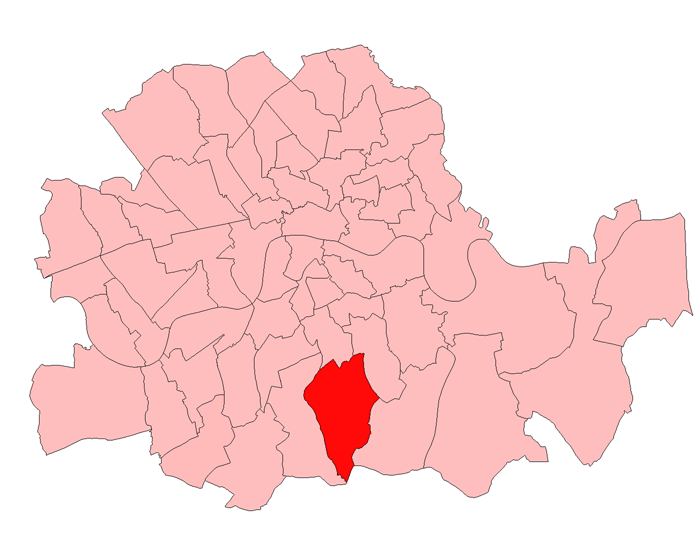
Dulwich

London County Council election, 1922: Dulwich
Party	Candidate	Votes	%	±%
Municipal Reform	**Henry Cubitt Gooch**	9,545		n/a
Municipal Reform	George Sitwell Campbell Swinton	9,364		n/a
Labour	H Luckhart	2,398		n/a
Labour	T E Wright	2,374		n/a
Majority				n/a
Municipal Reform **hold**		Swing	n/a	
Municipal Reform **hold**		Swing	n/a	

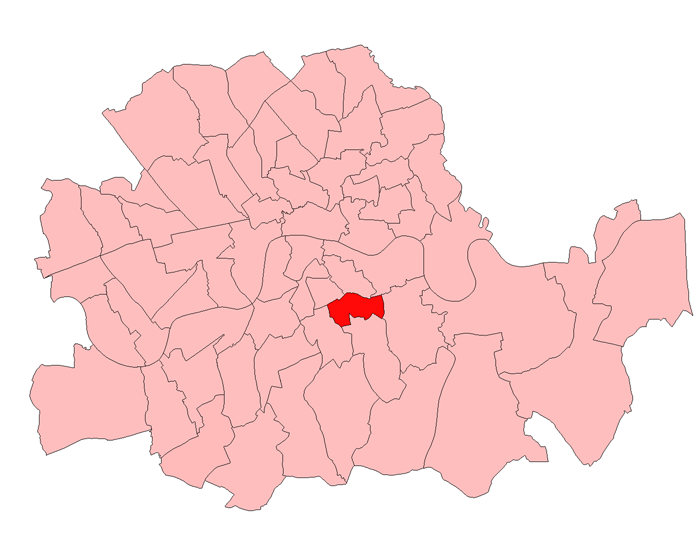
Camberwell North

London County Council election, 1922: Camberwell North
Party	Candidate	Votes	%	±%
Labour	**Charles George Ammon MP**	4,277		
Labour	Cecil Aubrey Gwynne Manning	4,011		
Municipal Reform	Alexander West Russell	2,152		
Municipal Reform	Dame Helen Charlotte Isabella Gwynne-Vaughan	2,137		
Progressive	**Herbert Arthur Baker**	1,235		
Progressive	Hugh Lawrence Fletcher Moulton	1,069		
Majority				
Labour **gain** from Progressive		Swing		
Labour **hold**		Swing		

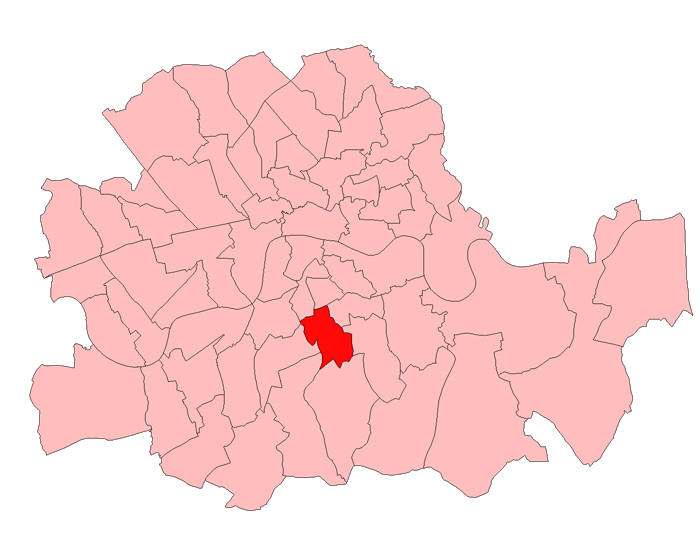
Camberwell North West

London County Council election, 1922: Camberwell North-West
Party	Candidate	Votes	%	±%
Municipal Reform	Charles D Kingston	4,794		
Municipal Reform	William Jackson Morton	4,551		
Labour	John George Spradbrow	2,846		
Labour	J F Lucas	2,520		
Progressive	**Seth Coward**	1,873		
Progressive	**Henry Ernest Wood**	1,806		
Majority				
Municipal Reform **gain** from Progressive		Swing		
Municipal Reform **gain** from Progressive		Swing		

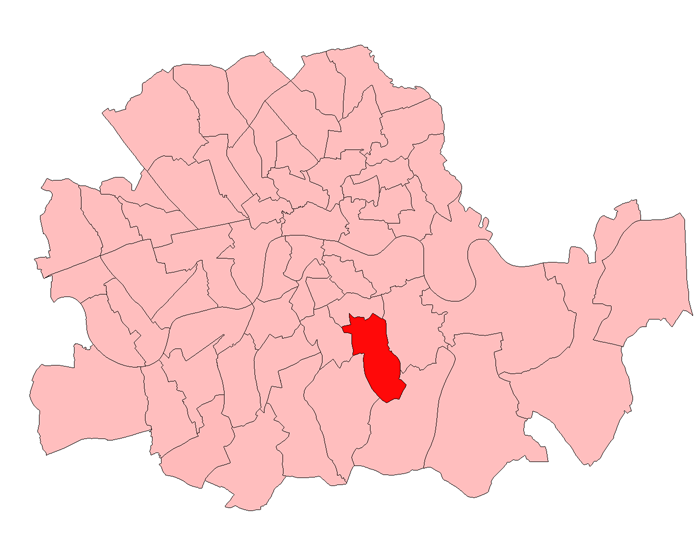
Peckham

London County Council election, 1922: Peckham
Party	Candidate	Votes	%	±%
Progressive	**Thomas Gautrey**	6,693		n/a
Progressive	**Earl of Haddo**	6,543		n/a
Labour	Arthur Creech-Jones	3,890		n/a
Labour	P Sabine	3,728		n/a
Majority				n/a
Progressive **hold**		Swing	n/a	
Progressive **hold**		Swing	n/a	

=== Chelsea ===
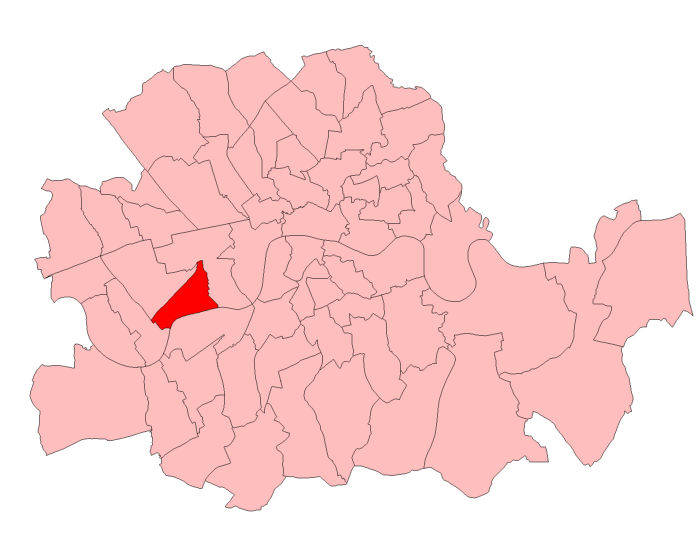
Chelsea

London County Council election, 1922: Chelsea
Party	Candidate	Votes	%	±%
Municipal Reform	William Sidney	7,727		n/a
Municipal Reform	**Ernest Louis Meinertzhagen**	7,655		n/a
Labour	J T Houlihan	3,214		n/a
Labour	Mrs C M Merrifield	3,203		n/a
Majority				n/a
Municipal Reform **hold**		Swing	n/a	
Municipal Reform **hold**		Swing	n/a	

=== City of London ===
London County Council election, 1922: City of London
Party	Candidate	Votes	%	±%
Municipal Reform	**Sir John Lulham Pound**	Unopposed	n/a	n/a
Municipal Reform	**William Wilson Grantham**	Unopposed	n/a	n/a
Municipal Reform	**Sir Percy Coleman Simmons**	Unopposed	n/a	n/a
Municipal Reform	**Geoffrey Head**	Unopposed	n/a	n/a
Municipal Reform **hold**		Swing	n/a	
Municipal Reform **hold**		Swing	n/a	
Municipal Reform **hold**		Swing	n/a	
Municipal Reform **hold**		Swing	n/a	

=== Deptford ===
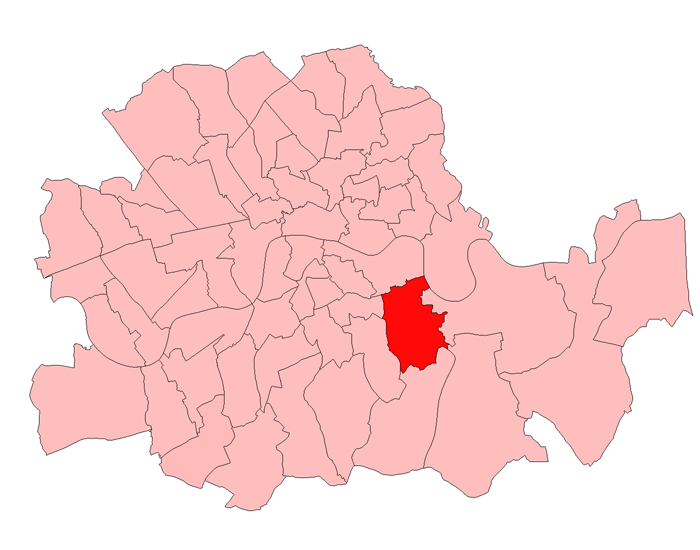
Deptford

London County Council election, 1922: Deptford
Party	Candidate	Votes	%	±%
Municipal Reform	Guy Herbert Walmisley	9,545	25.4	+4.4
Municipal Reform	Marshall James Pike	9,487	25.3	+6.8
Labour	**Margaret McMillan**	9,333	24.8	−6.2
Labour	**John Speakman**	9,199	24.5	−5.0
Majority		154	0.5	−8.1
Municipal Reform **gain** from Labour		Swing		
Municipal Reform **gain** from Labour		Swing		

=== Finsbury ===
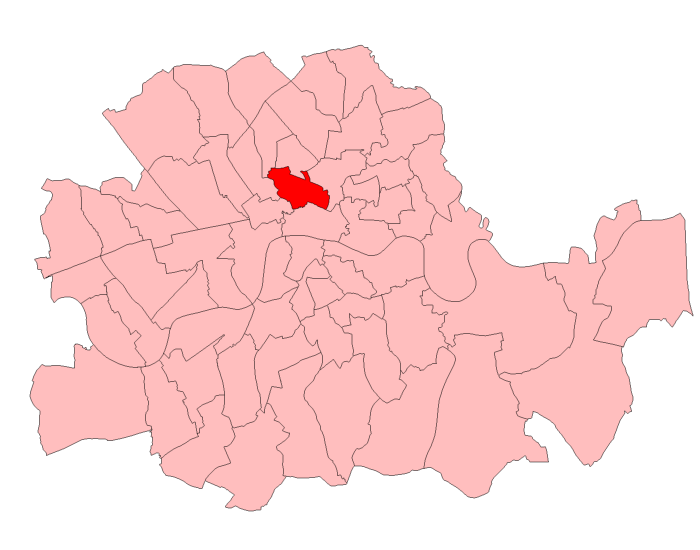
Finsbury

London County Council election, 1922: Finsbury
Party	Candidate	Votes	%	±%
Municipal Reform	Otho William Nicholson	5,778	25.7	+3.5
Municipal Reform	Miss Rachel M Parsons	5,636	25.1	+3.7
Labour	C H Brew	3,222	14.3	n/a
Labour	Charles R Simpson	3,109	13.8	n/a
Progressive	**Alfred Baker**	2,464	11.0	−18.9
Progressive	Miss Ida Samuel	2,253	10.0	−16.5
Majority		2,414	10.8	15.1
Municipal Reform **gain** from Progressive		Swing		
Municipal Reform **hold**		Swing		

=== Fulham ===
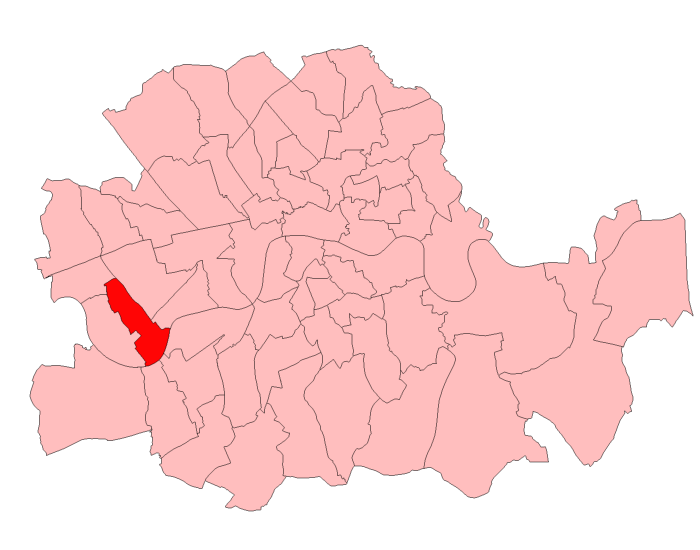
Fulham East

London County Council election, 1922: Fulham East
Party	Candidate	Votes	%	±%
Municipal Reform	**Beatrix Margaret Lyall**	7,941	35.1	+1.3
Municipal Reform	Frank Holmes	7,849	34.7	−0.1
Labour	T. M. Cox	3,431	15.2	−0.8
Labour	Isaac James Hayward	3,403	15.0	−0.4
Majority		4,418	19.5	−1.7
Municipal Reform **hold**		Swing		
Municipal Reform **hold**		Swing		

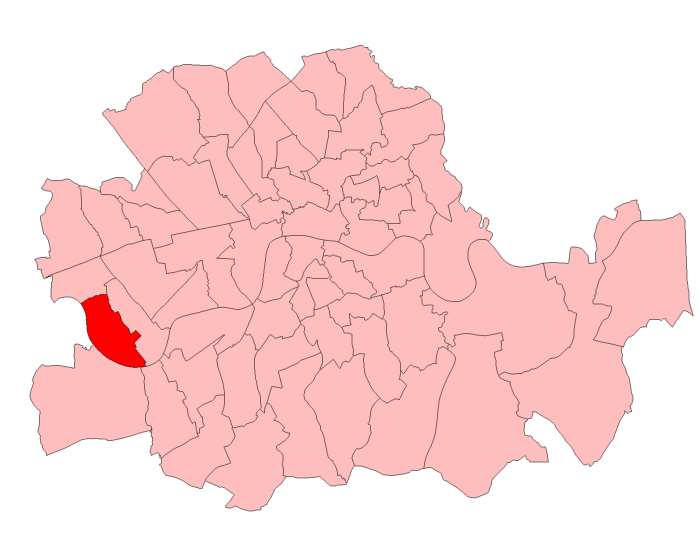
Fulham West

London County Council election, 1922: Fulham West
Party	Candidate	Votes	%	±%
Municipal Reform	**Sir Cyril Stephen Cobb**	9,849	34.8	+0.0
Municipal Reform	Frank W Hobbs	9,588	33.8	+1.6
Labour	Robert Mark Gentry	4,555	16.1	−1.5
Labour	Mrs I M Lineham	4,350	15.3	−0.1
Majority		5,033	17.7	+3.1
Municipal Reform **hold**		Swing		
Municipal Reform **hold**		Swing		

=== Greenwich ===
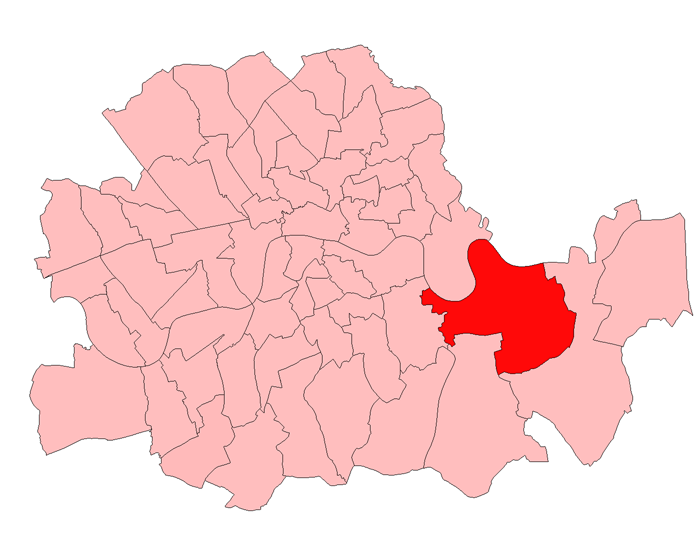
Greenwich

London County Council election, 1922: Greenwich
Party	Candidate	Votes	%	±%
Municipal Reform	**Ernest Martin Dence**	9,412	28.3	n/a
Municipal Reform	George Rowland Hill	9,367	28.2	n/a
Labour	Dr Hyacinth Bernard Morgan	7,332	22.0	n/a
Labour	J G Davenport	7,145	21.4	n/a
Majority				n/a
Municipal Reform **hold**		Swing	n/a	
Municipal Reform **hold**		Swing	n/a	

=== Hackney ===
Adler

London County Council election, 1922: Hackney Central
Party	Candidate	Votes	%	±%
Progressive	**Henrietta Adler**	Unopposed	n/a	n/a
Municipal Reform	**William Ray**	Unopposed	n/a	n/a
Progressive **hold**		Swing	n/a	
Municipal Reform **hold**		Swing	n/a	

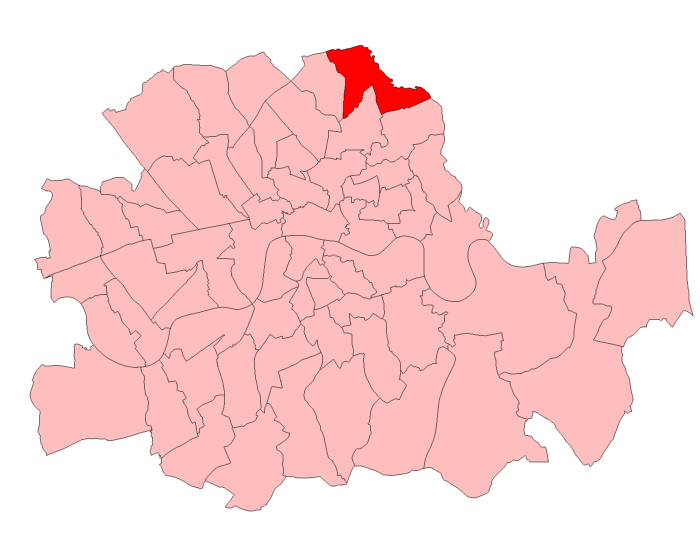
Hackney North

London County Council election, 1922: Hackney North
Party	Candidate	Votes	%	±%
Municipal Reform	**Lady Trustram Eve**	Unopposed	n/a	n/a
Municipal Reform	**Oscar Emanuel Warburg**	Unopposed	n/a	n/a
Municipal Reform **hold**		Swing	n/a	
Municipal Reform **hold**		Swing	n/a	

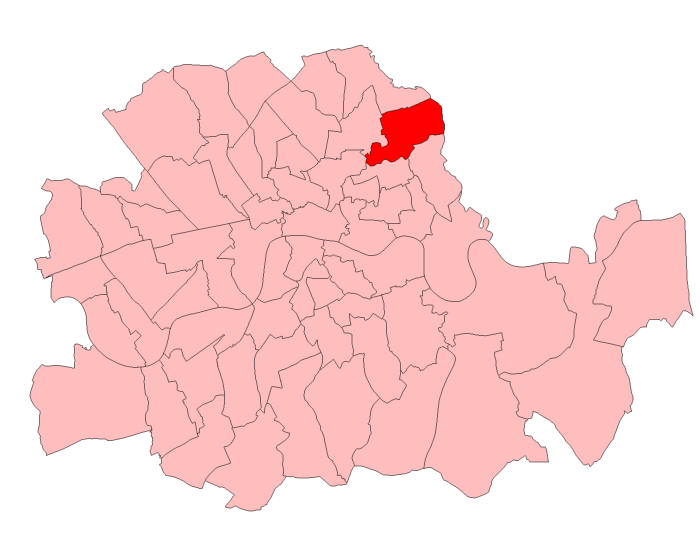
Hackney South

London County Council election, 1922: Hackney South
Party	Candidate	Votes	%	±%
Progressive	**Theodore Chapman**	4,588	32.0	n/a
Progressive	Herbert O Grant	4,416	30.8	n/a
Labour	E Wigan	2,669	18.6	n/a
Labour	Emma Boyce	2,662	18.6	n/a
Majority		1,747	12.2	n/a
Progressive **hold**		Swing	n/a	
Progressive **hold**		Swing	n/a	

=== Hammersmith ===
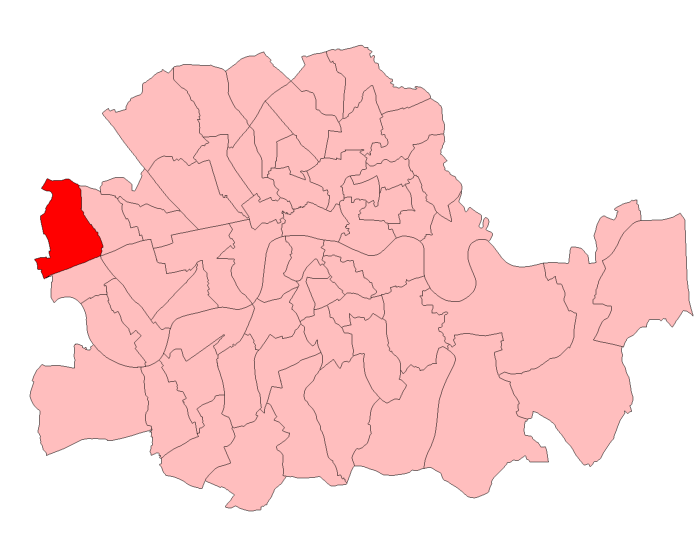
Hammersmith North

London County Council election, 1922: Hammersmith North
Party	Candidate	Votes	%	±%
Municipal Reform	**David Cawdron**	5,104	31.4	−1.8
Municipal Reform	Lord Decies	5,066	31.2	−5.2
Labour	John Thomas Westcott	3,049	18.8	n/a
Labour	T Martin	3,026	18.6	−11.7
Majority		2,017	12.4	+9.5
Municipal Reform **hold**		Swing		
Municipal Reform **hold**		Swing		

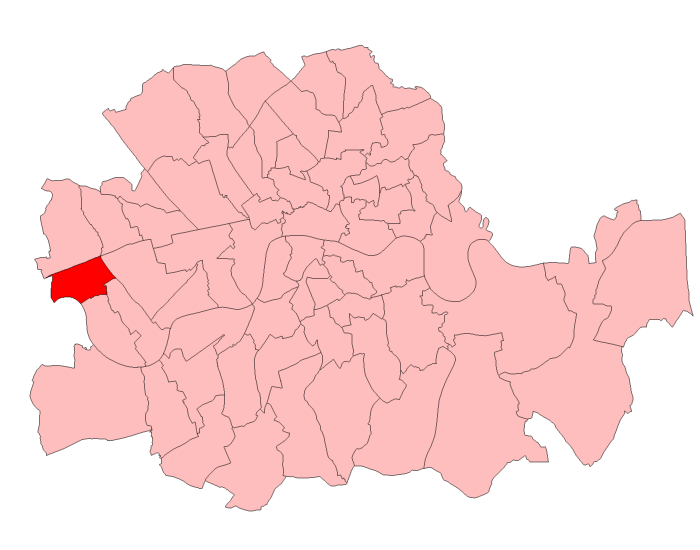
Hammersmith South

London County Council election, 1922: Hammersmith South
Party	Candidate	Votes	%	±%
Municipal Reform	**Francis Robert Ince Anderton**	6,483	36.4	−4.0
Municipal Reform	**Isidore Salmon**	6,415	36.1	−3.2
Labour	C J Atkinson	2,574	14.5	−4.4
Labour	Miss M Price	2,305	13.0	n/a
Majority		3,841	21.6	+2.7
Municipal Reform **hold**		Swing		
Municipal Reform **hold**		Swing		

=== Hampstead ===
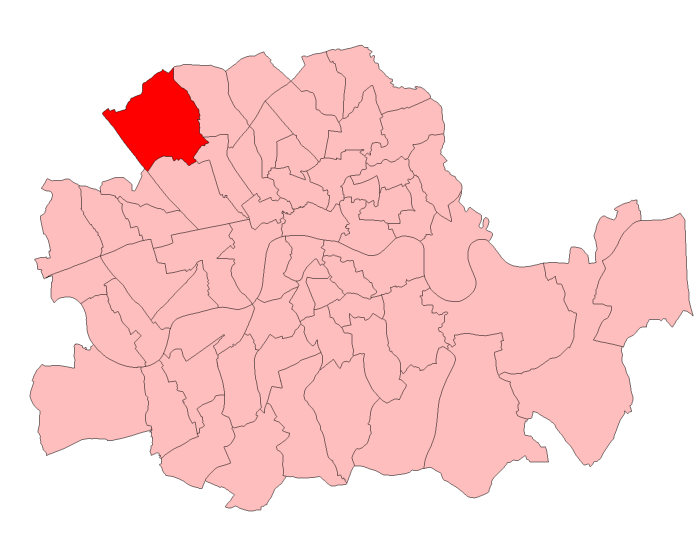
Hampstead

London County Council election, 1922: Hampstead
Party	Candidate	Votes	%	±%
Municipal Reform	**Andrew Thomas Taylor**	10,572		
Municipal Reform	**Walter Reynolds**	10,565		
Labour	E E Balfour	2,390		
Labour	J May	2,390		
Majority				
Municipal Reform **hold**		Swing		
Municipal Reform **hold**		Swing		

=== Holborn ===
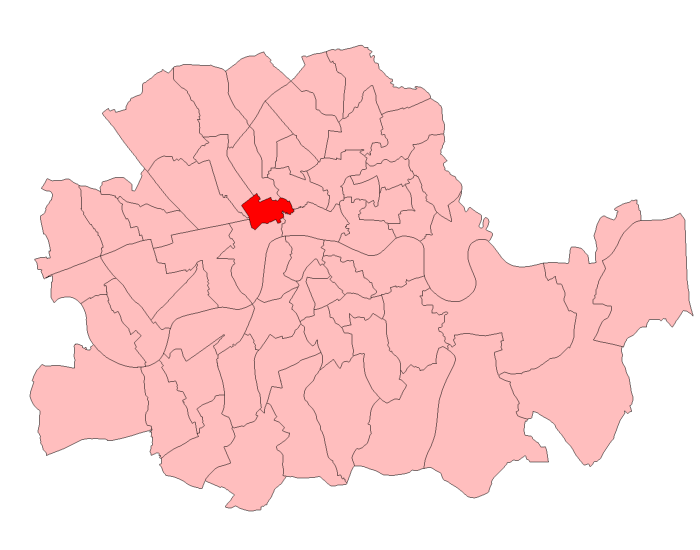
Holborn

London County Council election, 1922: Holborn
Party	Candidate	Votes	%	±%
Municipal Reform	Robert Inigo Tasker	5,234	46.2	n/a
Municipal Reform	George Harvey	5,143	45.4	n/a
Independent	H Janner	947	8.4	n/a
Majority		4,196	37.0	n/a
Municipal Reform **hold**		Swing	n/a	
Municipal Reform **hold**		Swing	n/a	

=== Islington ===
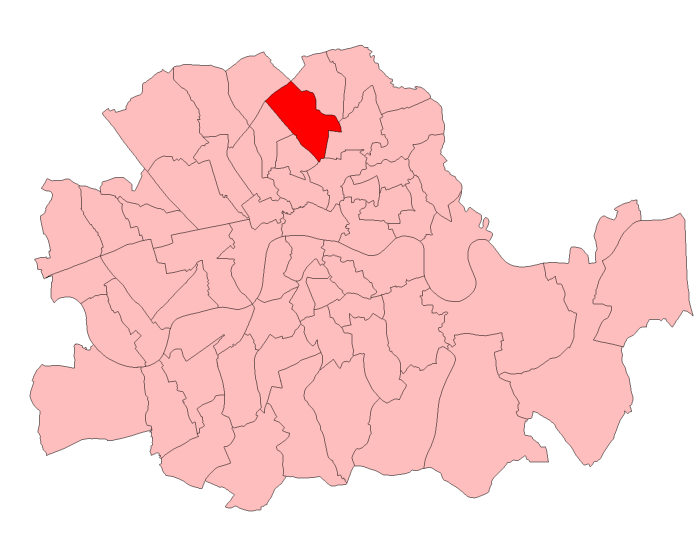
Islington East

London County Council election, 1922: Islington East
Party	Candidate	Votes	%	±%
Progressive	**William Lace Clague**	6,877	41.2	+5.9
Progressive	**Jack Percy Blake**	6,767	40.5	+6.7
Independent	George King Naylor	3,065	18.3	+2.7
Majority		3,702	22.2	
Progressive **hold**		Swing		
Progressive **hold**		Swing		

- Naylor had contested the seat in 1919 as a Municipal Reform candidate.

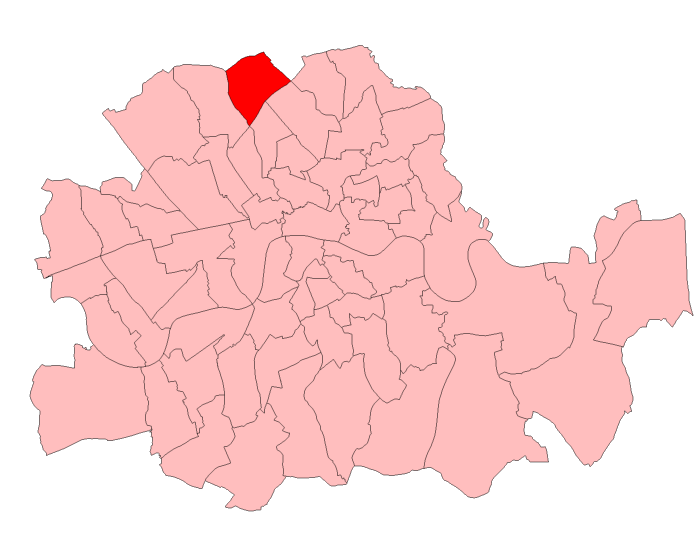
Islington North

London County Council election, 1922: Islington North
Party	Candidate	Votes	%	±%
Municipal Reform	**Frederick Lionel Dove**	8,644	26.9	+1.6
Municipal Reform	Miss Rosamund Smith	7,970	24.8	−0.4
Labour	**Robert McKenna**	4,833	15.1	−34.4
Labour	Hilda Caroline Miall Smith	4,766	14.8	n/a
Progressive	David Sydney Waterlow	3,207	10.0	n/a
Progressive	W. Allen	2,692	8.4	n/a
Majority		3,137	9.7	33.9
Municipal Reform **gain** from Labour		Swing		
Municipal Reform **hold**		Swing	n/a	

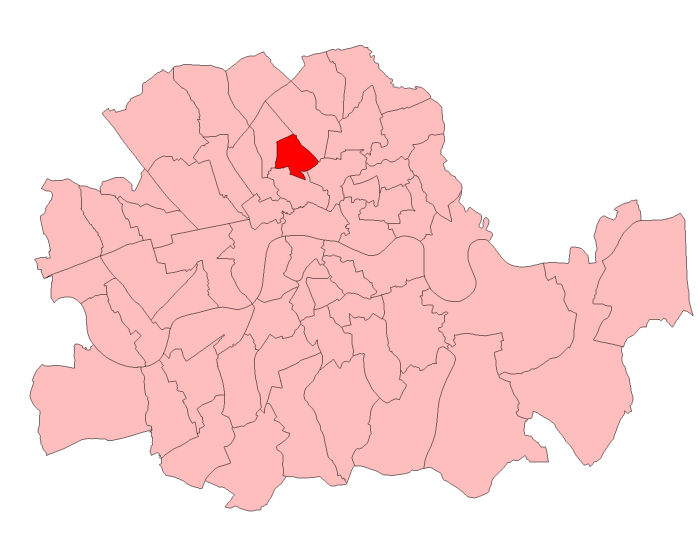
Islington South

London County Council election, 1922: Islington South
Party	Candidate	Votes	%	±%
Progressive	**Howell Jones Williams**	4,916	25.6	n/a
Progressive	**George Dew**	4,882	25.4	n/a
Municipal Reform	A Hudson	4,735	24.7	n/a
Municipal Reform	G Hampton Lewis	4,665	24.3	n/a
Majority		147	0.7	n/a
Progressive **hold**		Swing	n/a	
Progressive **hold**		Swing	n/a	

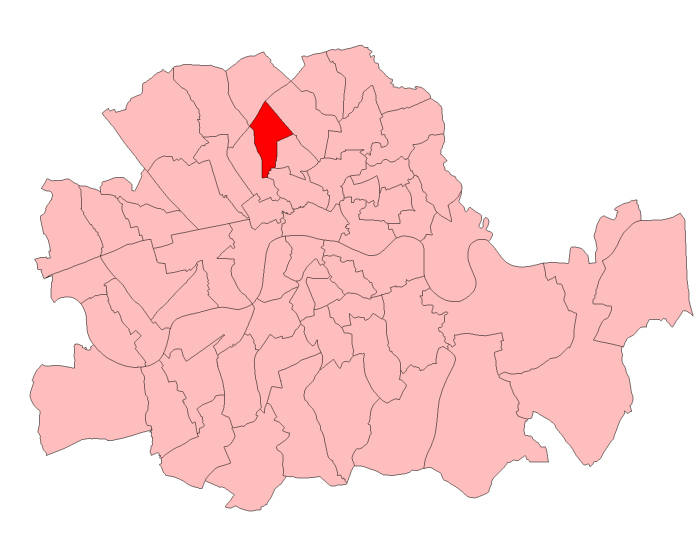
Islington West

London County Council election, 1922: Islington West
Party	Candidate	Votes	%	±%
Progressive	**Henry Mills**	5,903	33.6	n/a
Progressive	Frank Raffety	5,746	32.7	n/a
Labour	P. H. Black	3,013	17.2	n/a
Labour	G. Davison	2,894	16.5	n/a
Majority		2,733	15.5	n/a
Progressive **hold**		Swing	n/a	
Progressive **hold**		Swing	n/a	

=== Kensington ===
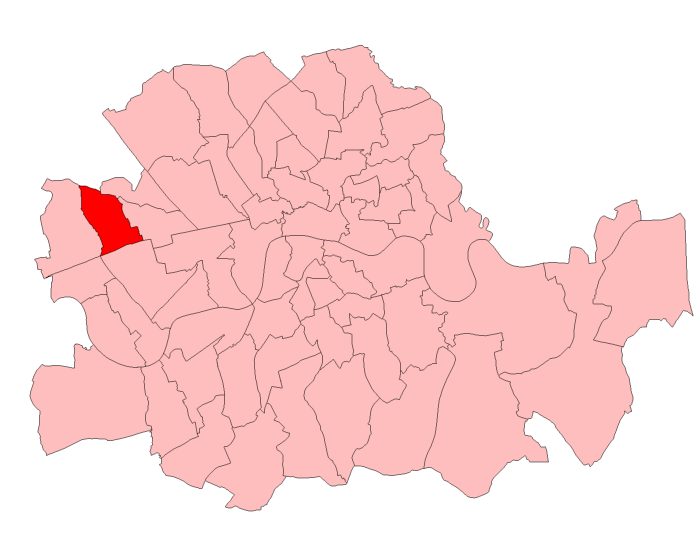
Kensington North

London County Council election, 1922: Kensington North
Party	Candidate	Votes	%	±%
Municipal Reform	**David Davis**	6,364	31.9	n/a
Municipal Reform	**Cecil Bingham Levita**	6,234	31.3	n/a
Labour	Barbara Drake	3,687	18.5	n/a
Labour	E. C. Porton	3,646	18.3	n/a
Majority		2,547	12.8	n/a
Municipal Reform **hold**		Swing	n/a	
Municipal Reform **hold**		Swing	n/a	

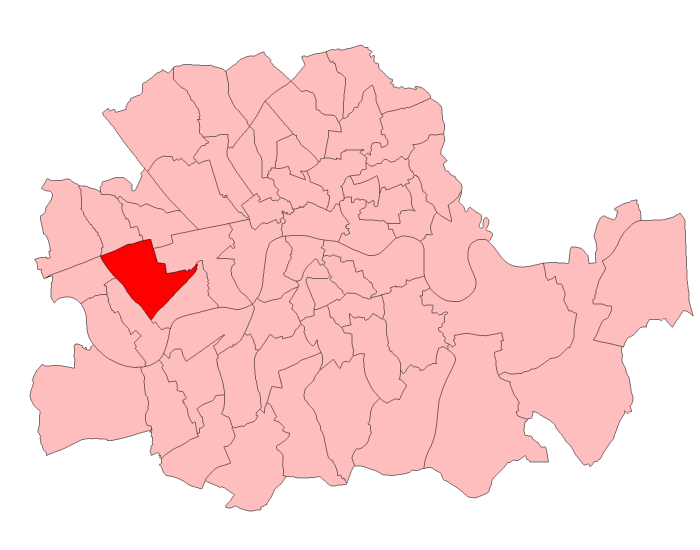
Kensington South

London County Council election, 1922: Kensington South
Party	Candidate	Votes	%	±%
Municipal Reform	**William Frederick Cavaye**	Unopposed	n/a	n/a
Municipal Reform	**Henry Vincent Rowe**	Unopposed	n/a	n/a
Municipal Reform **hold**		Swing	n/a	
Municipal Reform **hold**		Swing	n/a	

=== Lambeth ===
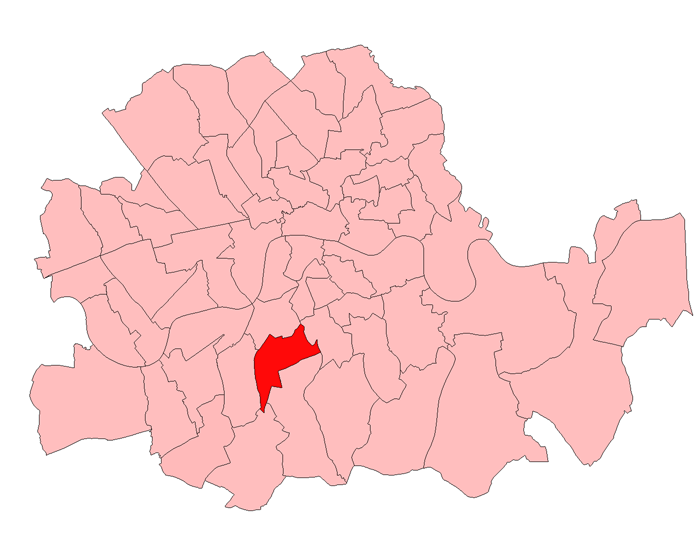
Brixton

London County Council election, 1922: Brixton
Party	Candidate	Votes	%	±%
Municipal Reform	**Ernest Gray**	8,260	35.5	+4.3
Municipal Reform	Gervas Evelyn Pierrepont	8,149	35.0	+3.0
Labour	W. I. G. Scott	3,455	14.8	−3.9
Labour	Henry Devenish Harben	3,423	14.7	−3.4
Majority		4,694	20.2	+7.7
Municipal Reform **hold**		Swing		
Municipal Reform **hold**		Swing		

Kennington

London County Council election, 1922: Kennington
Party	Candidate	Votes	%	±%
Municipal Reform	Harold Swann	5,728	31.8	+12.5
Progressive	**Sir John Williams Benn**	4,805	26.7	−4.6
Labour	**Harry Gosling**	4,275	23.7	−7.9
Labour	Charles William Gibson	3,212	17.8	n/a
Majority		530	3.0	−9.0
Municipal Reform **gain** from Labour		Swing		
Progressive **hold**		Swing		

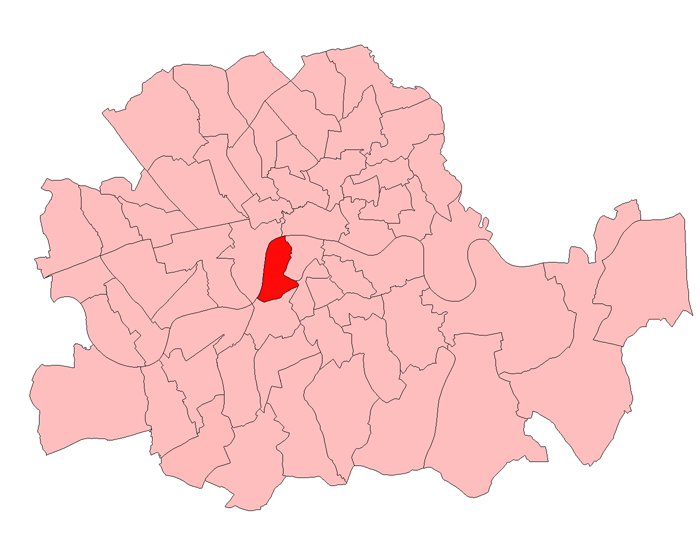
Lambeth North

London County Council election, 1922: Lambeth North
Party	Candidate	Votes	%	±%
Labour	R C E Powell	3,019	17.3	n/a
Progressive	Reginald Myer	3,015	17.2	−20.9
Progressive	Frank Dawson Lapthorn	3,015	17.2	n/a
Labour	JC Bessell	2,838	16.2	n/a
Municipal Reform	RT Sharpe	2,802	16.0	+3.3
Municipal Reform	T. Page	2,793	16.0	+4.4
Majority		0	0.0	−24.9
Labour **gain** from Independent		Swing	n/a	
Progressive **hold**		Swing		

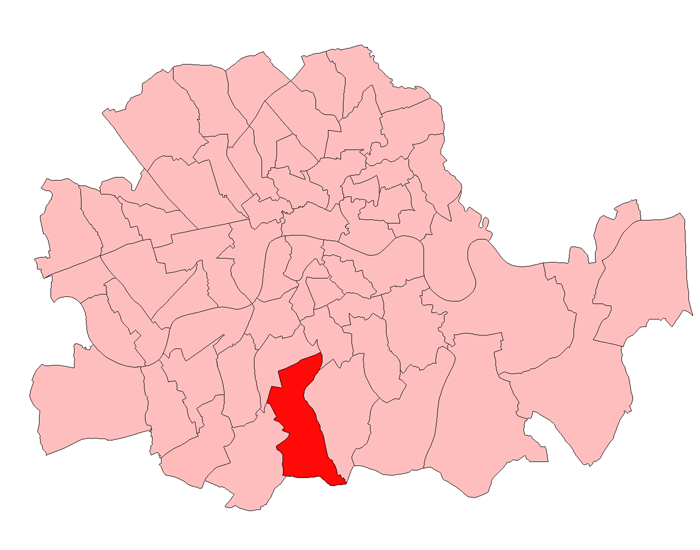
Norwood

London County Council election, 1922: Norwood
Party	Candidate	Votes	%	±%
Municipal Reform	Rose Dunn Gardner	12,076	38.0	n/a
Municipal Reform	William Francis Marchant	12,044	37.9	n/a
Labour	Edgar Lansbury	3,895	12.2	n/a
Labour	Alfred E Lugg	3,800	11.9	n/a
Majority		8,149	25.7	n/a
Municipal Reform **hold**		Swing	n/a	
Municipal Reform **hold**		Swing	n/a	

=== Lewisham ===
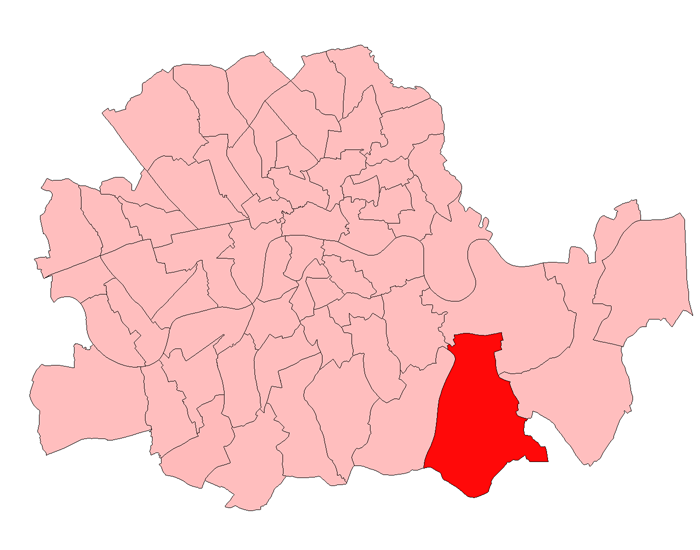
Lewisham East

London County Council election, 1922: Lewisham East
Party	Candidate	Votes	%	±%
Municipal Reform	Eric Ball	11,759	37.1	n/a
Municipal Reform	Richard Owen Roberts	11,288	35.6	n/a
Labour	W. J. R. Gillings	4,392	13.8	n/a
Labour	J. W. Matthews	4,295	13.5	n/a
Majority		6,896	21.8	n/a
Municipal Reform **hold**		Swing	n/a	
Municipal Reform **hold**		Swing	n/a	

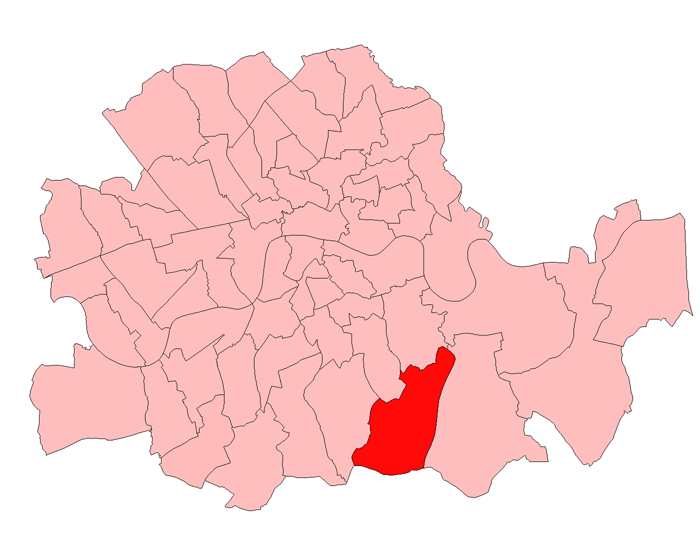
Lewisham West

London County Council election, 1922: Lewisham West
Party	Candidate	Votes	%	±%
Municipal Reform	Edward Taswell Campbell	8,680	35.4	+8.2
Municipal Reform	Percival H Reed	8,197	33.4	+7.1
Progressive	Henry Arthur Evans	4,013	16.4	−7.0
Progressive	G. H. Stepney	3,644	14.9	−8.2
Majority		4,184	17.0	+14.1
Municipal Reform **hold**		Swing		
Municipal Reform **hold**		Swing		

=== Paddington ===
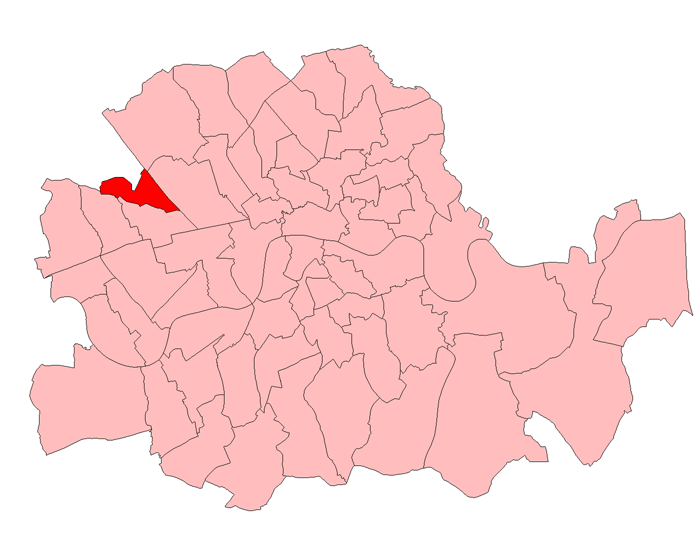
Paddington North

London County Council election, 1922: Paddington North
Party	Candidate	Votes	%	±%
Municipal Reform	John Herbert Hunter	7,722	34.5	+5.7
Municipal Reform	Thomas Clarence Edward Goff	7,713	34.5	+6.8
Labour	W. C. Bolton	3,484	15.6	−6.3
Labour	H P Lawless	3,456	15.4	−6.2
Majority		4,229	18.9	+13.1
Municipal Reform **hold**		Swing		
Municipal Reform **hold**		Swing		

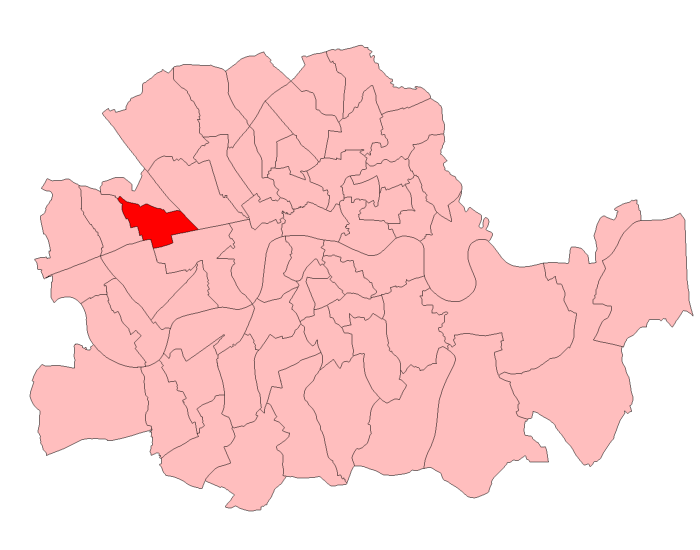
Paddington South

London County Council election, 1922: Paddington South
Party	Candidate	Votes	%	±%
Municipal Reform	**John Burgess-Preston Karslake**	Unopposed	n/a	n/a
Municipal Reform	**Harry Barned Lewis-Barned**	Unopposed	n/a	n/a
Municipal Reform **hold**		Swing		
Municipal Reform **hold**		Swing		

=== Poplar ===
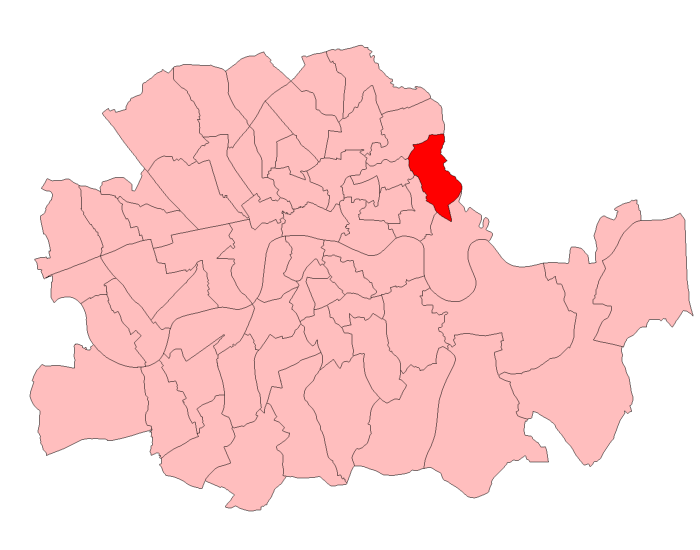
Bow and Bromley

London County Council election, 1922: Bow and Bromley
Party	Candidate	Votes	%	±%
Labour	**Charlie E Sumner**	8,121	31.9	
Labour	**Edward Cruse**	8,043	31.6	
Municipal Reform	Florence Barrie Lambert	4,721	18.5	
Municipal Reform	A. Barnard	4,599	18.0	
Majority		3,322	13.1	
Labour **hold**		Swing		
Labour **hold**		Swing		

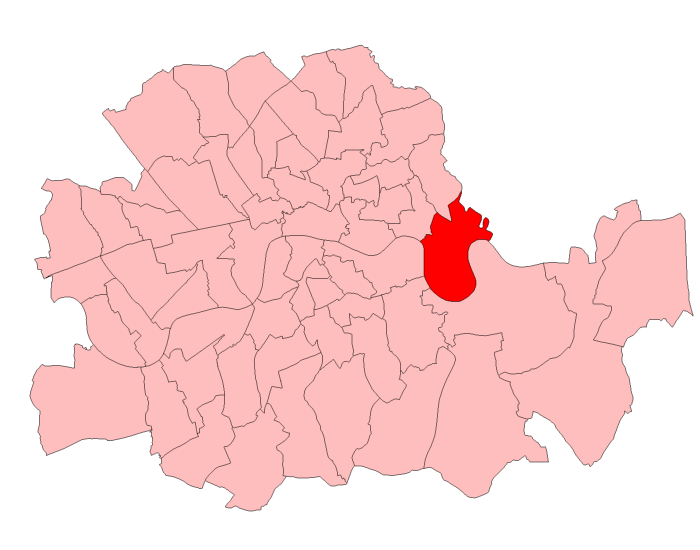
Poplar South

London County Council election, 1922: Poplar South
Party	Candidate	Votes	%	±%
Labour	**Samuel March**	10,716	31.6	
Labour	**Arabella Susan Lawrence**	10,511	31.0	
Municipal Reform	CR Ingleby	6,397	18.8	
Municipal Reform	Rev. A Tildesley	6,328	18.6	
Majority		4,114	12.2	
Labour **hold**		Swing		
Labour **hold**		Swing		

=== St Marylebone ===
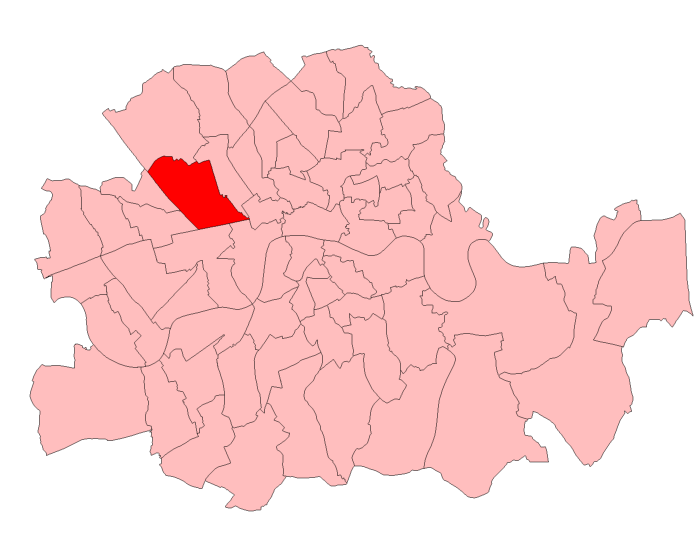
St Marylebone

London County Council election, 1922: St Marylebone
Party	Candidate	Votes	%	±%
Municipal Reform	Dr Adeline Roberts	Unopposed	n/a	n/a
Municipal Reform	**Ernest Sanger**	Unopposed	n/a	n/a
Municipal Reform **hold**		Swing		
Municipal Reform **hold**		Swing		

=== St Pancras ===
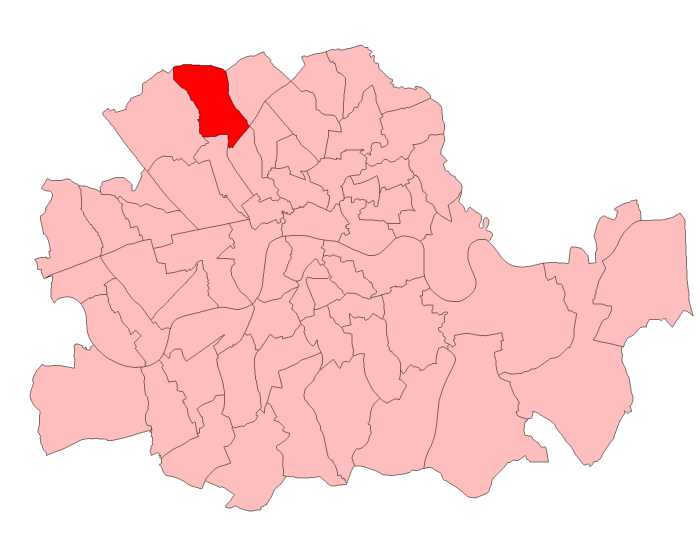
St Pancras North

London County Council election, 1922: St. Pancras North
Party	Candidate	Votes	%	±%
Municipal Reform	Ian Fraser	6,982	24.6	
Municipal Reform	Mrs Alice Elliot	6,751	23.8	
Labour	H J Brown	4,912	17.3	
Labour	Frank Lawrence Combes	4,798	16.9	
Progressive	**William Lloyd Taylor**	2,513	8.9	
Progressive	**John Hunter Harley**	2,407	8.5	
Majority		1,839	6.5	
Municipal Reform **gain** from Progressive		Swing		
Municipal Reform **gain** from Progressive		Swing		

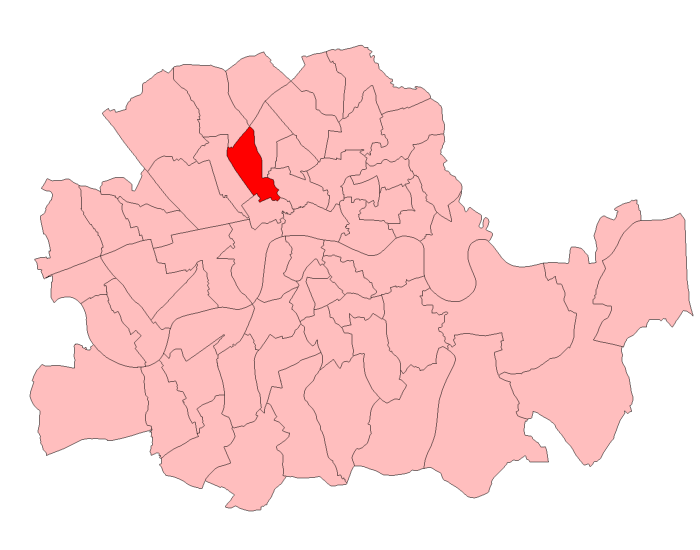
St Pancras South East

London County Council election, 1922: St. Pancras South East
Party	Candidate	Votes	%	±%
Municipal Reform	**Mrs Ethelind J Hopkins**	5,158	26.8	
Municipal Reform	**David Davies**	5,114	26.6	
Labour	S Presbury	2,617	13.6	
Labour	H D Large	2,613	13.6	
Progressive	Arthur Lewis Leon	1,859	9.7	
Progressive	Alfred Henry Scott	1,856	9.7	
Majority		2,497	13.0	
Municipal Reform **hold**		Swing		
Municipal Reform **hold**		Swing		

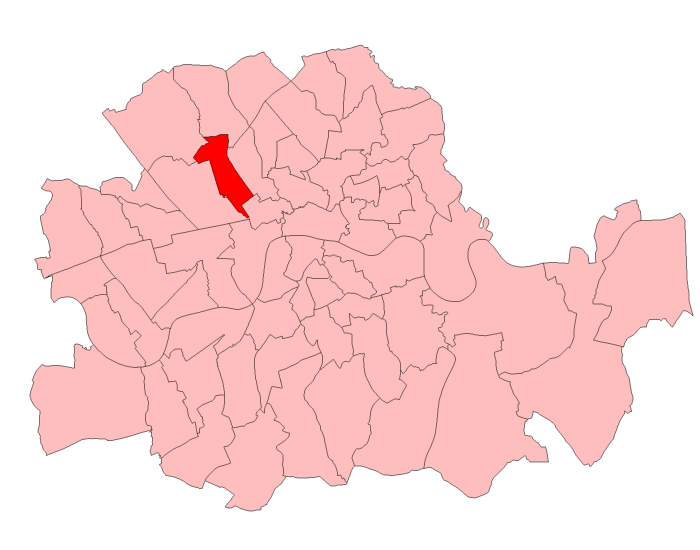
St Pancras South West

London County Council election, 1922: St. Pancras South West
Party	Candidate	Votes	%	±%
Municipal Reform	**Auberon Claud Hegan Kennard**	4,456	26.9	
Municipal Reform	**Charles William Matthews**	4,464	26.9	
Labour	Henry Montague Tibbles	2,036	12.3	
Labour	Albert Samuel Inkpin	1,992	12.0	
Progressive	Ernest Devan Wetton	1,814	10.9	
Progressive	R E Allen	1,810	10.9	
Majority		2,428	14.6	
Municipal Reform **hold**		Swing		
Municipal Reform **hold**		Swing		

=== Shoreditch ===
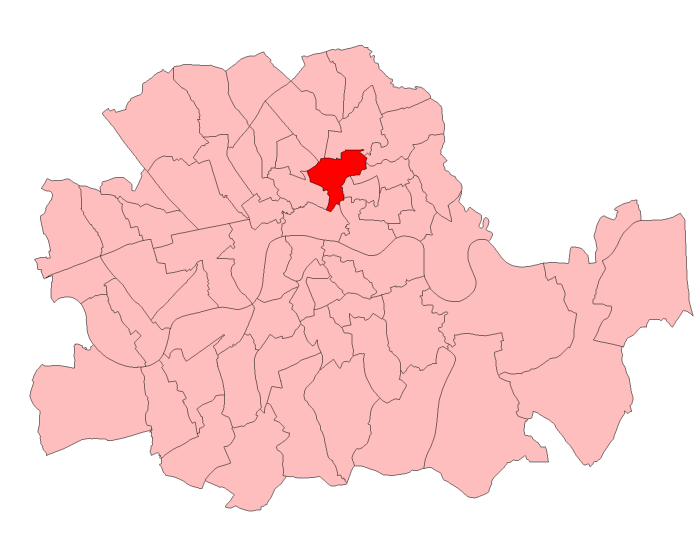
Shoreditch

London County Council election, 1922: Shoreditch
Party	Candidate	Votes	%	±%
Progressive	**Henry Ward**	4,015	28.7	
Progressive	Frank Stanley Henwood	3,814	27.2	
Labour	**C E Taylor**	3,215	23.0	
Labour	Alfred Walton	2,930	21.0	
Majority		599	4.2	
Progressive **gain** from Labour		Swing		
Progressive **hold**		Swing		

=== Southwark ===
London County Council election, 1922: Southwark Central
Party	Candidate	Votes	%	±%
Progressive	**James Daniel Gilbert**	6,374	35.9	n/a
Progressive	**George Henry Cook**	6,154	34.7	n/a
Labour	Lewis Silkin	2,618	14.7	n/a
Labour	W Barrett	2,611	14.7	n/a
Majority		3,536	20.0	n/a
Progressive **hold**		Swing	n/a	
Progressive **hold**		Swing	n/a	

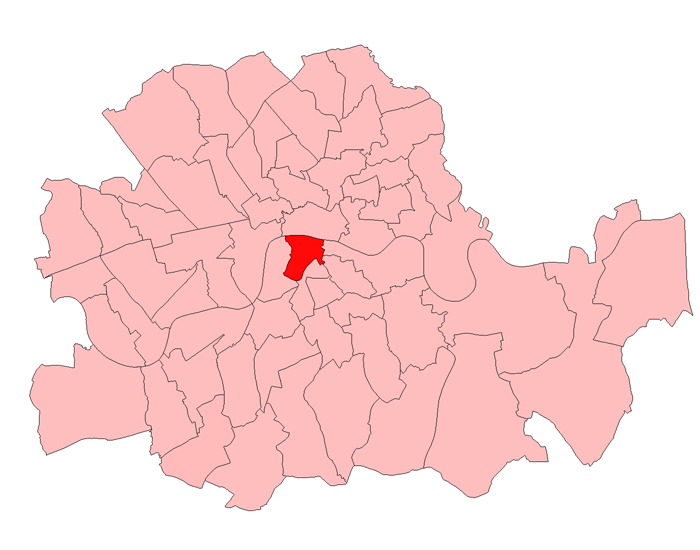
Southwark North

London County Council election, 1922: Southwark North
Party	Candidate	Votes	%	±%
Progressive	**James Owers Devereux**	4,453	32.1	−7.8
Municipal Reform	Frank Percy Rider	4,306	31.0	−5.7
Labour	George Wilfrid Holford Knight	2,565	18.5	+6.8
Labour	Rev T P Stevens	2,553	18.4	+6.7
Majority		1,741	12.5	−12.5
Municipal Reform **gain** from Progressive		Swing		
Progressive **hold**		Swing		

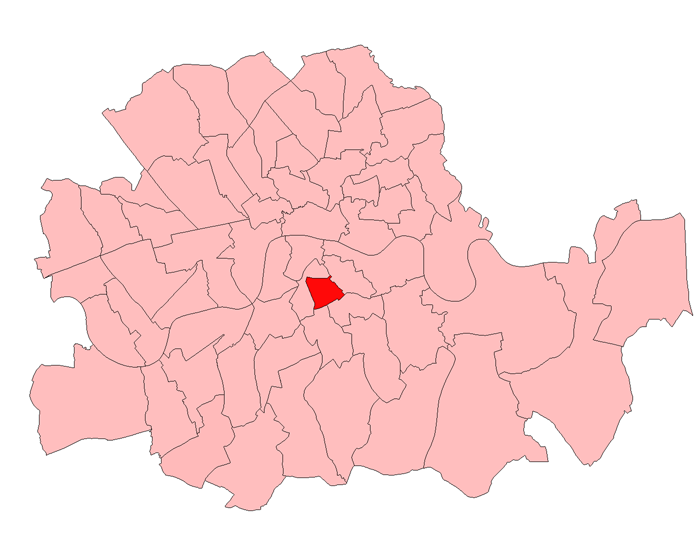
Southwark South East

London County Council election, 1922: Southwark South East
Party	Candidate	Votes	%	±%
Progressive	**William James Pincombe**	3,261	27.4	−12.2
Progressive	John Osborne	3,215	27.1	−11.9
Labour	G J Chaplin	2,703	22.8	+0.8
Labour	W H Lock	2,693	22.7	n/a
Majority		512	4.3	−12.7
Progressive **hold**		Swing		
Progressive **hold**		Swing		

=== Stepney ===
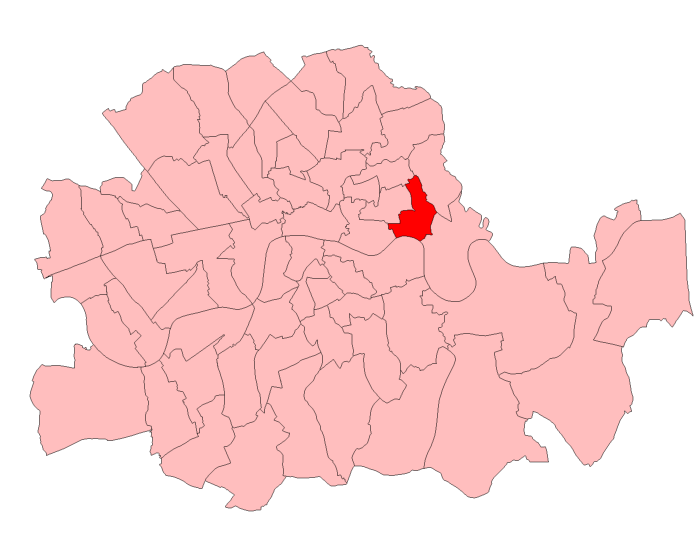
Limehouse

London County Council election, 1922: Limehouse
Party	Candidate	Votes	%	±%
Progressive	**Henry Marks**	5,746	28.8	+5.7
Municipal Reform	Clarissa Bessie Lankester	5,454	27.4	n/a
Labour	Julia Scurr	4,385	22.0	−0.6
Labour	Benjamin Skene Mackay	4,350	21.8	+1.0
Majority		1,069	5.4	+5.2
Municipal Reform **gain** from Labour		Swing	n/a	
Progressive **hold**		Swing		

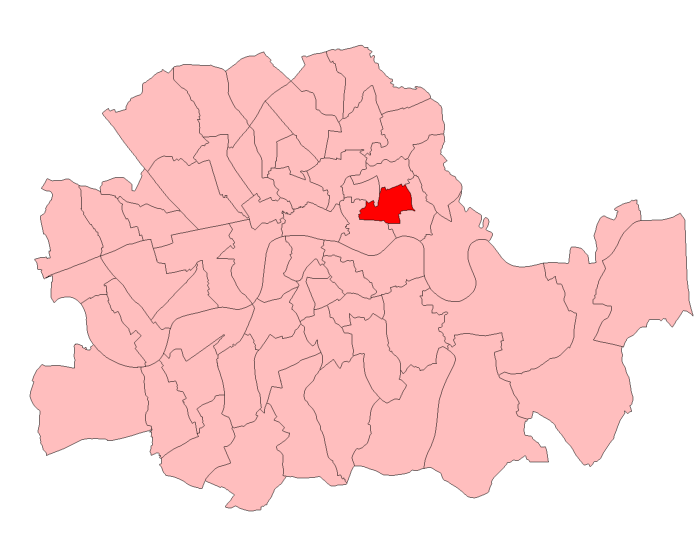
Mile End

London County Council election, 1922: Mile End
Party	Candidate	Votes	%	±%
Municipal Reform	John Cecil Gerard Leigh	3,695	27.4	−3.8
Municipal Reform	Offley Wakeman	3,658	27.1	−2.8
Labour	C H Norman	3,077	22.8	+3.3
Labour	John Scurr	3,048	22.6	+3.2
Majority		581	4.3	−6.1
Municipal Reform **hold**		Swing		
Municipal Reform **hold**		Swing		

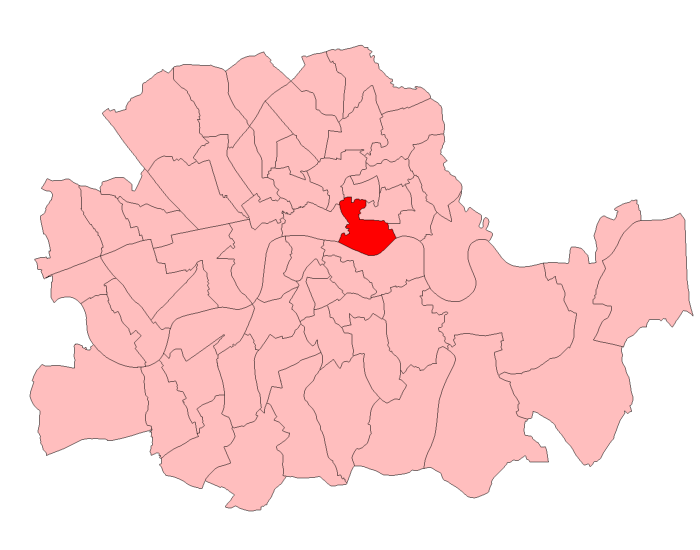
Whitechapel & St George's

London County Council election, 1922: Whitechapel
Party	Candidate	Votes	%	±%
Labour	**Christopher John Kelly**	3,244	19.0	n/a
Progressive	**William C Johnson**	3,085	18.1	
Labour	Morris Harold Davis	2,998	17.5	n/a
Progressive	Dr J J Reidy	2,972	17.4	
Municipal Reform	Woolf Joel	2,557	15.0	n/a
Municipal Reform	Claude Herbert Grundy	2,227	13.0	n/a
Majority		87	0.6	
Labour **gain** from Progressive		Swing		
Progressive **hold**		Swing		

=== Stoke Newington ===
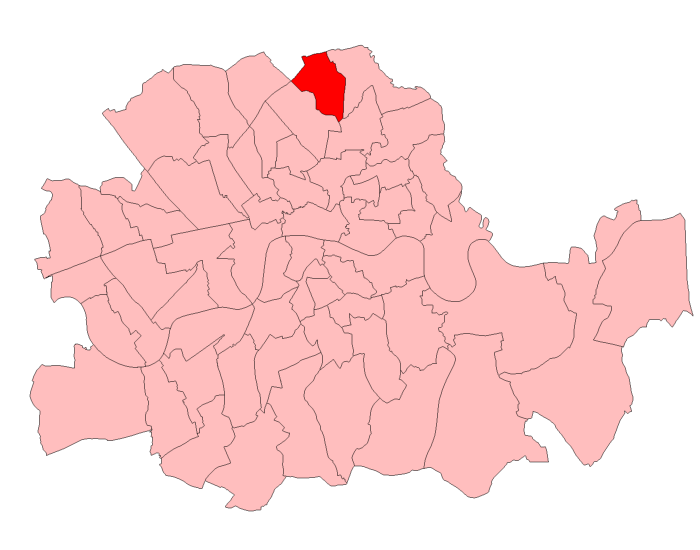
Stoke Newington

London County Council election, 1922: Stoke Newington
Party	Candidate	Votes	%	±%
Municipal Reform	**Edward Holton Coumbe**	4,312	42.5	−0.8
Municipal Reform	Archibald Albert McDonald Gordon	4,121	40.7	−1.0
Independent	George Wicks	1,704	16.8	+1.8
Majority		2,417	23.9	−2.8
Municipal Reform **hold**		Swing		
Municipal Reform **hold**		Swing		

=== Wandsworth ===
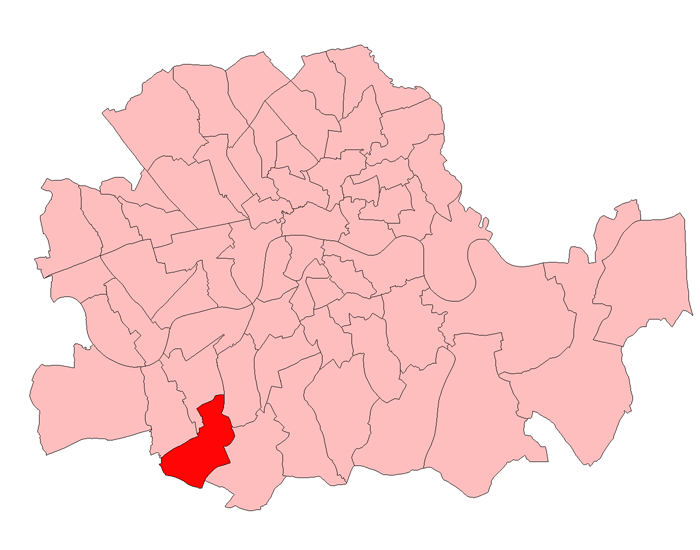
Balham and Tooting

London County Council election, 1922: Balham & Tooting
Party	Candidate	Votes	%	±%
Municipal Reform	John Ernest Perring	8,403	27.1	+13.5
Municipal Reform	Malcolm Campbell-Johnston	8,308	26.8	+13.8
Progressive	**Rev. Bevill Allen**	4,587	14.8	−12.3
Progressive	S G Warner	3,529	11.4	−15.1
Labour	Rev. G Bell	3,203	10.3	−0.0
Labour	Mary Thoresby	2,943	9.5	−0.4
Majority		3,721	12.0	24.9
Municipal Reform **gain** from Progressive		Swing		
Municipal Reform **gain** from Progressive		Swing		

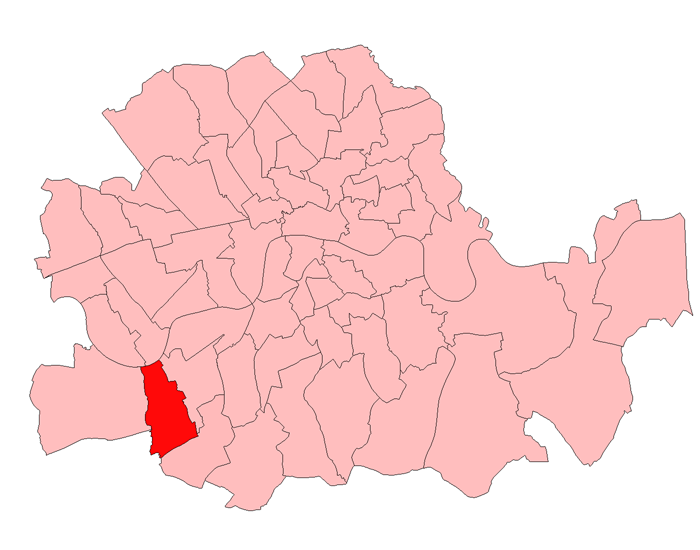
Wandsworth Central

London County Council election, 1922: Wandsworth Central
Party	Candidate	Votes	%	±%
Municipal Reform	**Robert G Taylor**	6,524	32.6	+3.5
Municipal Reform	Charles Paston Crane	6,514	32.6	+3.3
Labour	George Pearce Blizard	3,511	17.6	−4.6
Labour	W J Humphreys	3,447	17.2	n/a
Majority		3,003	15.0	
Municipal Reform **hold**		Swing		
Municipal Reform **hold**		Swing		

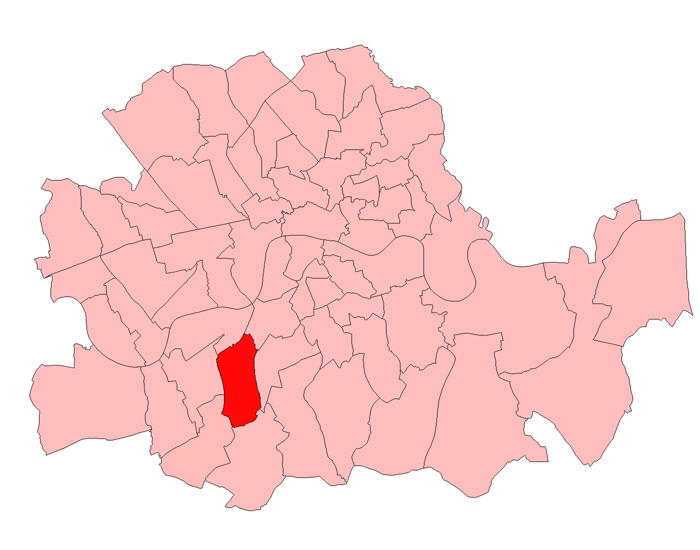
Clapham constituency

London County Council election, 1922: Clapham
Party	Candidate	Votes	%	±%
Municipal Reform	**Cyril H M Jacobs**	8,993	36.3	
Municipal Reform	Lord Monk Bretton	8,707	35.2	
Labour	H Harries	3,522	14.2	n/a
Labour	A. Stuart Albery	3,522	14.2	n/a
Majority		5,185	21.0	n/a
Municipal Reform **hold**		Swing	n/a	
Municipal Reform **hold**		Swing	n/a	

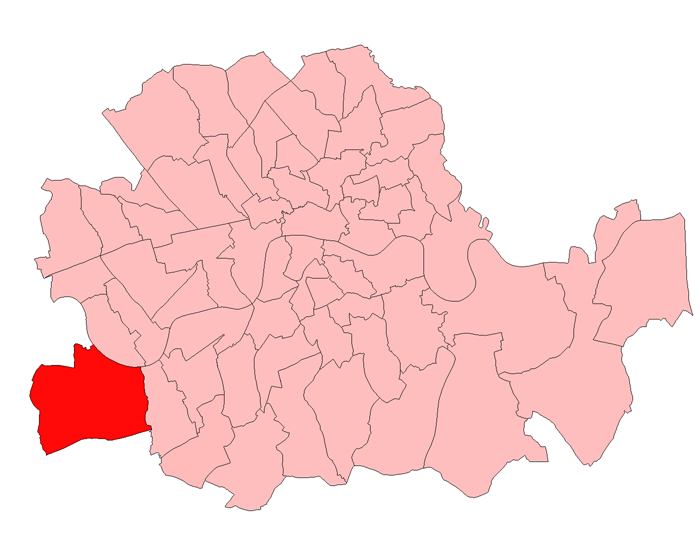
Putney

London County Council election, 1922: Putney
Party	Candidate	Votes	%	±%
Municipal Reform	William Hunt	8,307	41.1	
Municipal Reform	Angus Newton Scott	8,231	40.7	
Labour	Eli Jenkins	1,894	9.4	n/a
Labour	G Wyver	1,790	8.9	n/a
Majority		6,337	31.3	n/a
Municipal Reform **hold**		Swing	n/a	
Municipal Reform **hold**		Swing	n/a	

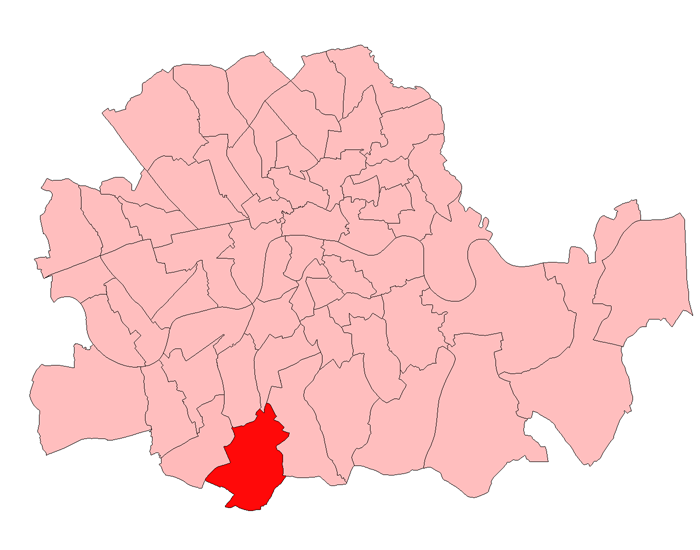
Streatham

London County Council election, 1922: Streatham
Party	Candidate	Votes	%	±%
Municipal Reform	**Sir Arthur Cornelius Roberts**	Unopposed	n/a	n/a
Municipal Reform	**Frederic Bertram Galer**	Unopposed	n/a	n/a
Municipal Reform **hold**		Swing	n/a	
Municipal Reform **hold**		Swing	n/a	

=== Westminster ===
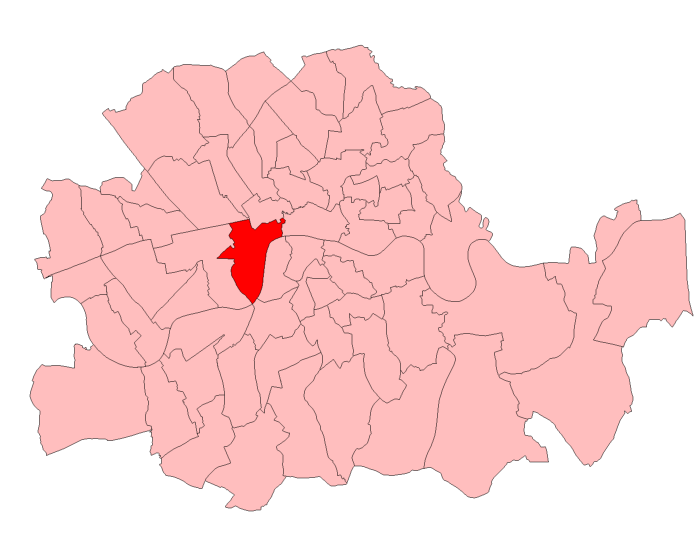
Abbey

London County Council election, 1922: Westminster Abbey
Party	Candidate	Votes	%	±%
Municipal Reform	**Reginald White Granville-Smith**	7,399	42.5	
Municipal Reform	**John Maria Emilio Gatti**	7,301	42.0	
Labour	J H Martin	1,360	7.8	n/a
Labour	L. Agnes Dawson	1,332	7.7	n/a
Majority		5,941	34.2	n/a
Municipal Reform **hold**		Swing	n/a	
Municipal Reform **hold**		Swing	n/a	

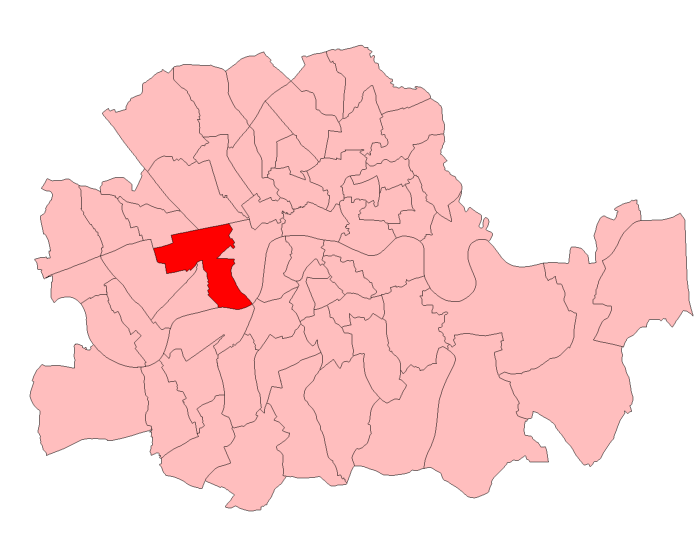
St George's

London County Council election, 1922: Westminster St George's
Party	Candidate	Votes	%	±%
Municipal Reform	**Richard Joshua Cooper**	Unopposed	n/a	n/a
Municipal Reform	**Hubert John Greenwood**	Unopposed	n/a	n/a
Municipal Reform **hold**		Swing	n/a	
Municipal Reform **hold**		Swing	n/a	

=== Woolwich ===
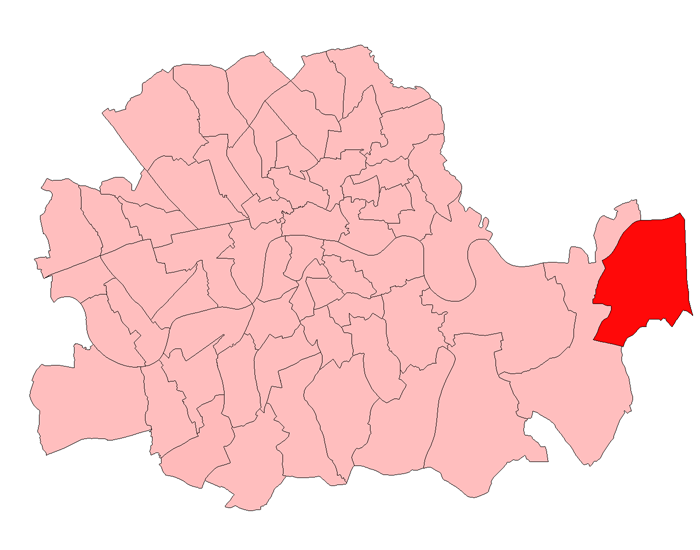
Woolwich East

London County Council election, 1922: Woolwich East
Party	Candidate	Votes	%	±%
Labour	Herbert Stanley Morrison	9,046	28.5	−5.6
Labour	**Henry Snell**	8,978	28.3	−5.5
Municipal Reform	Frederick George Penny	6,764	21.3	+5.2
Municipal Reform	Austin Uvedale Morgan Hudson	6,277	19.8	+3.9
Independent	R James	366	1.2	n/a
Independent	J C Witcher	314	1.0	n/a
Majority		2,214		
Labour **hold**		Swing		
Labour **hold**		Swing		

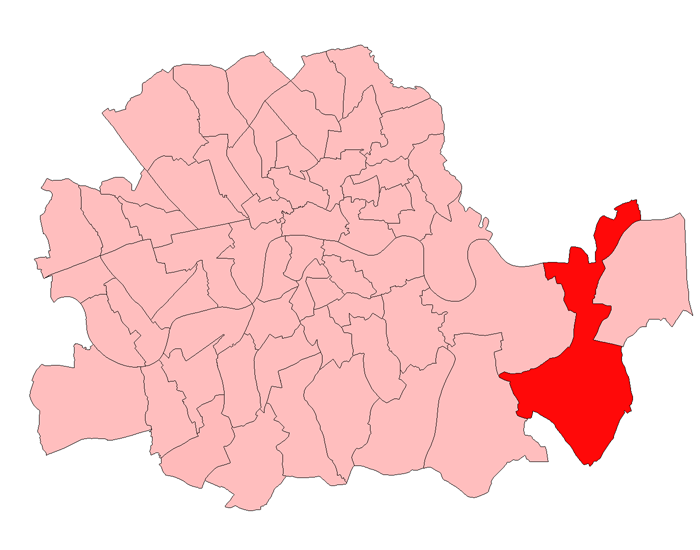
Woolwich West

London County Council election, 1922: Woolwich West
Party	Candidate	Votes	%	±%
Municipal Reform	Sidney H Cuff	8,654	29.9	+1.8
Municipal Reform	Ernest Henry Kemp	8,573	29.6	+2.6
Labour	Rev. J. F. Matthews	5,907	20.4	−2.4
Labour	H. A. Hart	5,845	20.2	−1.9
Majority				
Municipal Reform **hold**		Swing		
Municipal Reform **hold**		Swing		

== Aldermen ==
The council also appointed 20 aldermen, to serve for a 6-year term. After the elections, there were eleven aldermanic vacancies and the following alderman were appointed by the newly elected council;

- John Jacob Astor, Municipal Reform
- Alfred Ordway Goodrich, Municipal Reform (retiring councillor for Mile End)
- George Hopwood Hume, Municipal Reform (retiring councillor for Greenwich)
- Dr Florence Barrie Lambert, Municipal Reform (retiring councillor for Brixton)
- Ronald Collet Norman, Municipal Reform (retiring councillor for Chelsea)
- Jessie Wilton Phipps, Municipal Reform
- Sir Harry Lushington Stephen, Municipal Reform
- Herbert Arthur Baker, Progressive (retiring councillor for Camberwell North)
- Dr John Scott Lidgett, Progressive (retiring councillor for Rotherhithe)
- George Masterman Gillett, Labour (retiring Progressive councillor for Finsbury)
- Albert Emil Davies, Labour (re-appointed)

== By-elections 1922-1925 ==
There was one by-election to a fill casual vacancy during the term of the twelfth London County Council.

=== Lambeth, Kennington, 29 April 1922 ===
- Cause: death of Sir John Williams Benn, 10 April 1922

London County Council by-election, 1922: Kennington
Party	Candidate	Votes	%	±%
Labour	Harry Gosling	3,871	42.2	
Municipal Reform	Captain Austin Uvedale Morgan Hudson	3,378	36.9	
Progressive	Alderman G Brittain	1,917	20.9	
Majority		493	5.3	
Labour gain from Progressive		Swing		

== Aldermanic vacancies filled 1922-1925 ==
There were six casual vacancies among the aldermen in the term of the eleventh London County Council, which were filled as follows:

- 24 October 1922: Arthur Acland Allen (Progressive) to serve until 1925 in place of Henry Evan Auguste Cotton, resigned 17 October 1922. Allen had previously sat as a councillor from 1899 to 1913.
- 30 January 1923: Mrs Anna Maria Mathew (Labour) to serve until 1925 in place of her husband Charles James Mathew, died 8 January 1923.
- 23 October 1923: Maj. Harry Barnes (Progressive) to serve until 1925 in place of Henry de Rosenbach Walker, died 31 July 1923.
- 5 February 1924: Henry Thomas McAuliffe (Municipal Reform) to serve until 1925 in place of Viscount Hill, died 19 December 1923.
- 18 March 1924: Alfred Baker (Labour) to serve until 1925 in place of George Masterman Gillett resigned 11 March 1924. Baker had previously sat as a councillor from 1919 to 1922.
- 25 November 1924: Hon. Gilbert Johnstone (Municipal Reform) to serve until 1925 in place of Sir Cyril Jackson died 3 September 1924. Johnstone had previously sat as a councillor from 1907 to 1910 and 1911–1917.
