= Albert Samuels =

British politician

Albert Edward Samuels (12 May 1900 – 19 June 1982) was a British politician, who held leading roles on the London County Council (LCC) and Greater London Council (GLC).

Samuels was educated at Sir Walter St John's School and King's College London, qualifying as a solicitor in 1921. He joined the Labour Party, and in 1922 won election to Battersea Metropolitan Borough Council, then from 1925 served on the council as an alderman.

Samuels contested Battersea South unsuccessfully at the 1925 London County Council election. He was instead appointed to the Metropolitan Water Board, and at the 1928 London County Council election, he won a seat in St Pancras South East. He lost his seat in 1931, but gained a seat in St Pancras South West in 1934, and was immediately appointed as chair of the Public Control Committee.

Samuels stood down from the county council in 1937, but remained politically active. From 1941, he again served on the Metropolitan Water Board, then at the 1946 London County Council election, he won a seat in Balham and Tooting, and was re-appointed as chair of the Public Control Committee. His seat was abolished in 1949, and he instead contested Clapham, where he was defeated. However, at the 1952 London County Council election, he won a seat in Stoke Newington and Hackney North, and once more became chair of the Public Control Committee. Having finally established himself in a safe seat, he quickly became one of the most important members of the council, described as part of an "inner cabinet".

In 1955, Samuels moved to chair the Establishment Committee, and in 1958/59, he was chair of London County Council. From 1961, he represented Bermondsey, his fifth constituency. The council was abolished in 1965, but Samuels won a seat on its replacement, the Greater London Council, and was the first chair of its Public Health Services Committee.

Samuels left the council in 1967, but remained a member of the London Rent Assessment Panel until 1973, and from 1968 until 1974 chaired the Redhill and Netherne Group Hospital Management Committee. In 1958, he was made a commander of the Order of Merit of the Italian Republic, and a knight commander of the Order of Merit of the Federal Republic of Germany.

Civic offices
Preceded by Ronald McKinnon Wood	Chair of the London County Council; 1958–1959	Succeeded by Sidney James Barton
