= 1937 London County Council election =

1937 local election in England

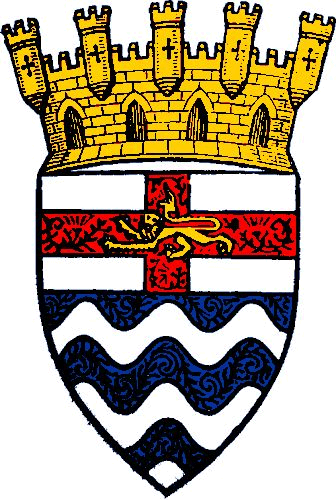
- 4 March 1937
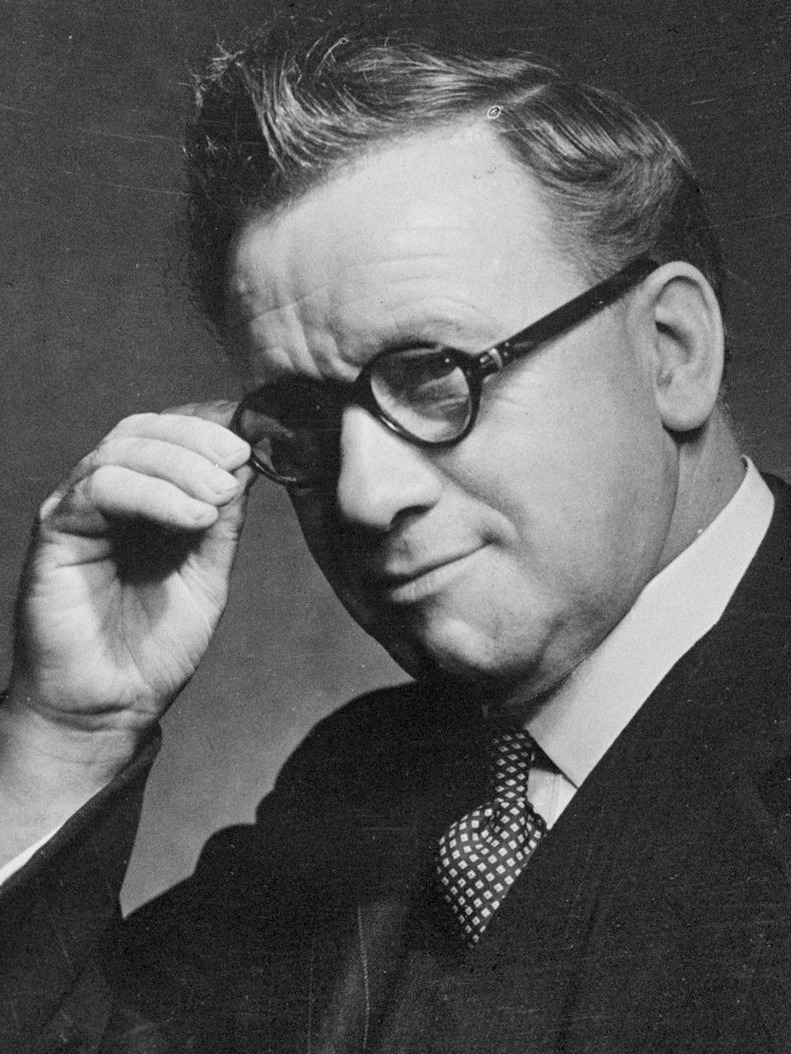
	First party	Second party
		MR
Leader	Herbert Morrison	Harold Webbe
Party	Labour	Municipal Reform
Leader since	1933	1934
Leader's seat	Alderman	City of London
Last election	69	55
Seats won	75	49
Seat change	▲6	▼6

An election to the County Council of London took place on 4 March 1937. The council was elected by First Past the Post with each elector having two votes in the two-member seats. The Labour Party made gains, increasing their majority over the Municipal Reform Party.

== Campaign ==
The Labour Party had gained control of the council for the first time in 1934. It campaigned on its record of three years running the council, and also called for a Metropolitan Green Belt, the completion of slum clearance, a scheme to beautify the South Bank, and the provision of more school playing fields. The party ran candidates for every seat other than the four in the City of London.

The Conservatives, running as the Municipal Reform Party, hoped to regain control of council, believing that their defeat in 1934 was due to complacency and a low turnout. Its manifesto noted that Labour had failed to meet its 1934 promise of increased house building, and proposed rebuilding schools, providing cheap milk for schoolchildren, opening new nurseries, and constructing a major road from the north to the south of the city, through Charing Cross, to relieve traffic congestion.

The Liberal Party had lost its last seats on the council in 1934. While not the favourites in any seat, the Manchester Guardian claimed that they might win up to six seats, in Lambeth North and the two Bethnal Green constituencies. In the two Bethnal Green seats, the party was not opposed by the Municipal Reformers or their allies. Percy Harris issued an appeal to voters, calling for the construction of more housing and better traffic facilities.

The National Liberal Party ran candidates as the "Municipal Progressive Party", or in some cases as "Liberal Progressive and Ratepayers' candidates". They ran in coalition with the Municipal Reform Party, and the Manchester Guardian argued that their platform was entirely conservative, and that in Lambeth North they would split the liberal vote, making a Liberal Party victory less likely.

The Communist Party of Great Britain decided not to run its own candidates, but instead to campaign on behalf of the Labour Party. Herbert Morrison, leader of the Labour Party, repudiated the support, but the Municipal Reformers emphasised the communist involvement. However, by polling day, the Municipal Reformers acknowledged that this approach had not won new voters over to them.

The Manchester Guardian predicted that Labour would retain control, with a slightly increased majority, gaining one seat in Wandsworth Central, with eighteen seats too close to call. The Municipal Reformers were hopeful of gaining Fulham East, Fulham West, Greenwich, Hackney North, Lewisham East, St Pancras South West and Woolwich West, while Labour hoped to gain St Pancras North.

== Results ==
Labour gained ten seats: one in Fulham East, one in Islington North, one in Wandsworth Central, both in Kensington North and Stoke Newington, and three additional seats in the St Pancras constituencies. The Municipal Reformers gained one seat in Fulham West, one in Peckham and both seats in Woolwich West. Both the Liberal Party and Municipal Progressives were disappointed not to come close to winning any seats. The British Union of Fascists were also far off winning a seat, but performed better than expected, particularly in Bethnal Green North East.

Turnout in the election was 42.6%, the highest for many years, and it reached 56.8% in Woolwich West. The Municipal Reformers were surprised that this did not result in gains for them.

Party	Votes			Seats	
Party	Number	%	Stood	Seats	%
Labour	446,483	51.2	120	75	60.5
Municipal Reform	377,895	43.3	103	49	39.5
Municipal Progressive	48,282		15	0	0.0
Liberal	20,922		18	0	0.0
British Union	15,278		6	0	0.0
Independent	771		3	0	0.0
Independent Labour	385		1	0	0.0
