= Edwin Evans (politician) =

British politician & estate agent (1855-1928)

Sir Edwin Evans (1855 – 4 April 1928) was a British politician and estate agent.

== Background ==
Edwin Evans was born in Kentish Town, north London, England. Later he moved to the expanding suburbs of south London, where he established his auctioneering business, eventually settling in Battersea.

== Career ==
Evans became active in the Conservative Party and in 1910 was selected by the Municipal Reform Party to contest elections to the London County Council. He was not elected on that occasion, and declined the offer of standing as a member of parliament. Instead, he became involved in extra-parliamentary activities opposing the budgetary policies of the Liberal government, in particular the introduction of Capital Gains Tax. He was a founder member of the Land Union, and President of the Protection of Property Association (POPA). In 1910, he was appointed to the board of the Stepney and Suburban Building Society.

In 1913, Evans was elected to the county council as a Municipal Reform Party councillor, representing Wandsworth in south London. During the First World War he was a member of the council's Parks, Smallholdings and Allotments Standing Committee, which oversaw the use of public spaces for the production of food. In 1919, he was re-elected to the county council as a councillor for Battersea South, holding the seat until 1925.

== Knighthood ==
In the 1927 Birthday Honours, Evans was knighted for “political and public services in Battersea”.
