= George Pearce Blizard =

British politician

George Pearce Blizard (1870 – 1947) was a British politician. A frequent candidate for office, he never won an election, but did serve a term on London County Council as an alderman.

Born in Stow-on-the-Wold in Gloucestershire, Blizard was educated in Cheltenham and Clevedon, before finding work at the headquarters of the London and Country Bank, then in 1900 he began working for the Scottish Equitable, and then Star Life in Ireland. From 1922, he was assistant registrar of the Dental Board, while later in the decade he worked for various syndicates promoting motorway construction.

Blizard became active in the Fabian Society, serving on its committee on a couple of occasions in the 1910s. He was also active in the Fabian Research Group, and revised the society's "Facts for Socialists" tract. He later became active in the Socialist Health Association, and was secretary to a committee which produced A Socialised Medical Service.

At the 1913 London County Council election, Blizard stood as a Progressive Party candidate in Whitechapel, but was not elected. He soon joined the Labour Party, for which he stood in Wandsworth Central at the 1918 and 1923 United Kingdom general elections, and also in the 1919 and 1922 London County Council elections. He next stood in Birmingham Moseley at the 1924 United Kingdom general election, Gillingham at the 1929 United Kingdom general election, and Thornbury in 1931, then Kensington North at the 1934 London County Council election.

Following the 1934 election, Labour won control of London County Council, and Blizard was appointed as an alderman, serving until 1946.
