= List of mayors of St Pancras =

This is a list of mayors of the Metropolitan Borough of St Pancras, London, from 1900 to 1965. After 1965, the metropolitan borough became part of the London Borough of Camden.

- 1900-02 Councillor Edmund Barnes D.L. J.P.
- 1902-03 Alderman W.H. Matthews
- 1903-04 Alderman Thomas Howell Williams Idris J.P.
- 1904-05 Alderman Frederick Purchese
- 1905-06 Councillor George Hickling
- 1906-07 Alderman Donald McGregor
- 1907-08 Councillor Alfred Mills
- 1908-09 Councillor E.T. Heron
- 1909-10 Councillor James Bryan
- 1910-11 Councillor F.W. Avant
- 1911-12 Alderman David Davies
- 1912-13 Councillor C.A. Coggan
- 1913-14 Councillor Thomas A. Collins
- 1914-15 Alderman Joseph May
- 1915-16 Alderman J.H. Mitchell D.L.
- 1916-17 Alderman Charles W. Matthews D.L.
- 1917-18 Alderman Charles Williams
- 1918-19 Councillor G.F. Parsons
- 1919-20 Councillor William Carter
- 1920-21 Alderman H.J. Brown J.P.
- 1921-22 Councillor Thomas W. McCormack
- 1922-23 Alderman Harold Trill
- 1923-24 Councillor R.F.W. Fincham F.C.A.
- 1924-25 Councillor F.B. Gurney F.A.I.
- 1925-26 Alderman Dr Edward A. Gregg
- 1926-27 Councillor Rev. R. Conyers Morrell M.A.
- 1927-28 Councillor Alfred Squire F.A.I.
- 1928-29 Councillor E.J. Saunders
- 1929-30 Councillor H.E. Capes
- 1930-31 Councillor Christopher Harvey
- 1931-32 Sir Alfred Davies CBE, J.P., L.C.C.
- 1932-33 Alderman Sidney Bolsom F.R.G.S.
- 1933-34 Councillor Frederic Hewson
- 1934-35 Councillor C.H. Denyer, M.A.
- 1935-37 Alderman R.F.W. Fincham F.C.A.
- 1937-38 Councillor J.C.G. Sperni, M.I., Struct. E.
- 1938-39 Councillor George Albert Watts
- 1939-41 Alderman Evan Evans
- 1941-44 Councillor E.A. Minter
- 1944-45 Alderman J.H. Mitchell
- 1945-46 Councillor Frank Lawrence Combes
- 1946-47 Councillor Fred Powe
- 1947-49 Councillor Mrs Lilian Bryant
- 1949-50 Councillor J.W. Kingsley Maile
- 1950-52 Councillor Sidney G. Williams
- 1952-53 Councillor R.C.W. Trill
- 1953-54 Councillor C.J. Ratchford, J.P.
- 1954-55 Councillor Arthur Bryant A.M.I. B.E.
- 1955-56 Mrs I.M.C. Bonham, M.A. L.C.C.
- 1956-57 Councillor A.C. Hurst
- 1957-58 Councillor T.J. Remman
- 1958-59 Councillor Tom Barker, M.I. PET
- 1959-60 Harold P. Bastie
- 1960-61 Councillor Mrs Louise Arabia
- 1961-62 Councillor Thomas Richard Morris
- 1962-63 Councillor Mrs Grace F. Lee, L.C.C.
- 1963-64 Councillor Mrs Hilda Chandler
- 1964-65 Councillor C.J. Ratchford, J.P.
