= St Pancras East (London County Council constituency) =

London County Council constituency

- Former constituency for the London County Council

Former constituency
- Created: 1889
- Abolished: 1919
- Member(s): 2
- Replaced by: St Pancras South East

St Pancras East was a constituency used for elections to the London County Council between 1889 and 1919. The seat shared boundaries with the UK Parliament constituency of the same name.

== Councillors ==
Year	Name	Party	Name	Party
1889	Nathan Robinson	Progressive	Thomas Bentley Westacott	Moderate
1898	Nathan Robinson	Progressive	Frederick Purchese	Progressive
1901	Nathan Robinson	Progressive	Thomas Arthur Organ	Progressive
1902	Howell Idris	Progressive	Thomas Arthur Organ	Progressive
1904	Howell Idris	Progressive	Edmund Barnes	Moderate
1907	Albert William Claremont	Progressive	Frederick Hastings	Progressive
1910	Albert William Claremont	Progressive	Hugh Lea	Progressive
1913	Albert William Claremont	Progressive	Henry de Rosenbach Walker	Progressive

== Election results ==
1889 London County Council election: St Pancras East
Party	Candidate	Votes	%	±%
Progressive	Nathan Robinson	1,824		
Moderate	Thomas Bentley Westacott	1,649		
Moderate	Harry Simon Samuel	1,259		
Independent	Forbes Hallett	1,059		
Social Democratic Federation	H. W. Hobart	471		
Moderate win (new seat)				
Progressive win (new seat)				

1892 London County Council election: St Pancras East
Party	Candidate	Votes	%	±%
Progressive	Nathan Robinson	2,223		
Moderate	Thomas Bentley Westacott	1,971		
Ind. Labour Party	John Yallop	526		
Progressive hold		Swing		
Moderate hold		Swing		

1895 London County Council election: St Pancras East
Party	Candidate	Votes	%	±%
Progressive	Nathan Robinson	2,287		
Moderate	Thomas Bentley Westacott	1,966		
Progressive	W. H. Walkley	1,942		
Moderate	John Lambton	1,763		
Social Democratic Federation	John Yallop	83		
Progressive hold		Swing		
Moderate hold		Swing		

1898 London County Council election: St Pancras East
Party	Candidate	Votes	%	±%
Progressive	Nathan Robinson	2,952		
Progressive	Frederick Purchese	2,741		
Moderate	Edward William Sinclair-Cox	1,698		
Moderate	A. F. Calvert	1,575		
Progressive gain from Moderate		Swing		
Progressive hold		Swing		

1901 London County Council election: St Pancras East
Party	Candidate	Votes	%	±%
Progressive	Nathan Robinson	2,858	33.1	+0.2
Progressive	Thomas Arthur Organ	2,739	31.8	+1.2
Conservative	Edward William Sinclair-Cox	1,525	17.7	−1.2
Conservative	John Arthur Angus	1,499	17.4	−0.2
Progressive hold		Swing		
Progressive hold		Swing	+0.7	

1904 London County Council election: St Pancras East
Party	Candidate	Votes	%	±%
Progressive	Howell Idris	2,751		
Conservative	Edmund Barnes	2,731		
Progressive	Daniel Hennessy	2,553		
Majority				
Conservative gain from Progressive		Swing		
Progressive hold		Swing		

1907 London County Council election: St Pancras East
Party	Candidate	Votes	%	±%
Progressive	Albert William Claremont	3,482		
Progressive	Frederick Hastings	3,410		
Municipal Reform	Edmund Barnes	3,181		
Municipal Reform	Thomas Arthur Organ	3,005		
Social Democratic Federation	G. Horne	295		
Majority				
Progressive gain from Municipal Reform		Swing		
Progressive hold		Swing		

1910 London County Council election: St Pancras East
Party	Candidate	Votes	%	±%
Progressive	Hugh Lea	3,764		
Progressive	Albert William Claremont	3,678		
Municipal Reform	David Hazel	2,789		
Municipal Reform	Arthur Veasey	2,738		
Majority				
Progressive hold		Swing		

1913 London County Council election: St Pancras East
Party	Candidate	Votes	%	±%
Progressive	Albert William Claremont	2,549		
Progressive	Henry de Rosenbach Walker	2,522		
Municipal Reform	W. Clark-Smith	2,454		
Municipal Reform	J. Hewson	2,436		
Majority		68		
Progressive hold		Swing		
Progressive hold		Swing		
