= Southgate Cemetery =

Cemetery in Enfield, London, England

Coordinates: 51°37′33″N 0°07′56″W

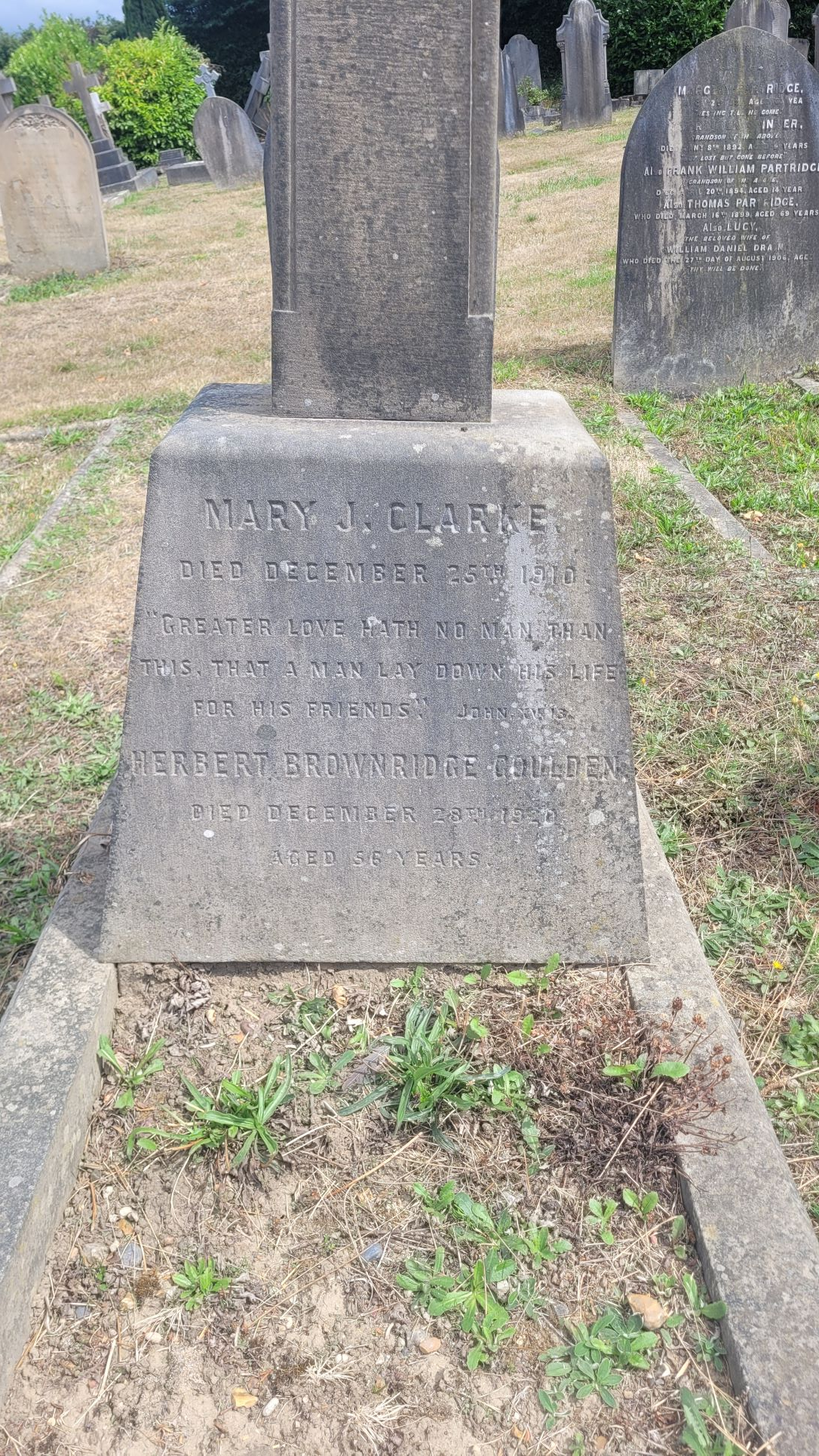
This is the inscription on Mary Jane Clarke's grave; also buried here is her brother Herbert Goulden

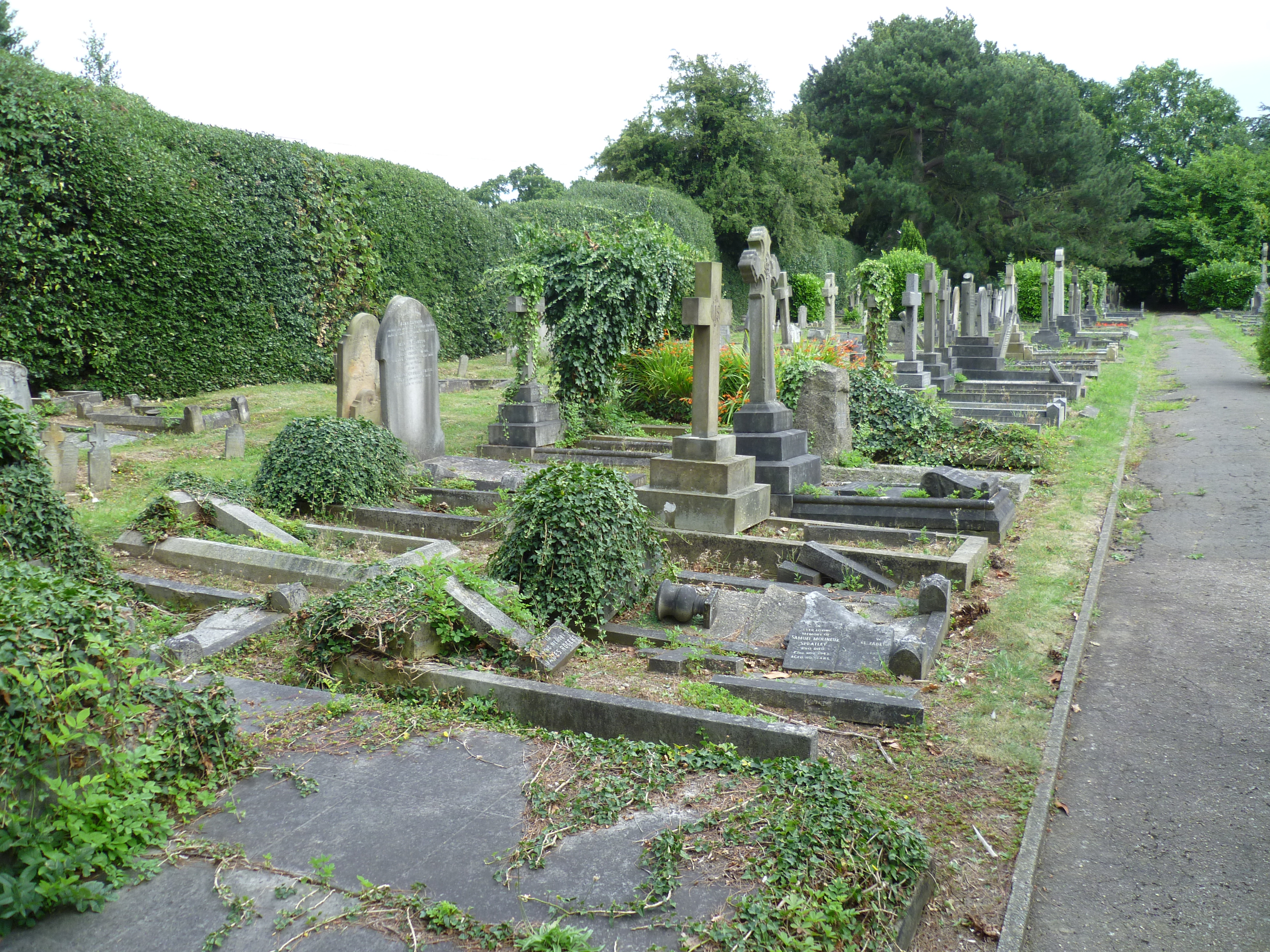
General view of Southgate Cemetery

Southgate Cemetery, sometimes known as Edmonton and Southgate Cemetery or Old Southgate Cemetery, is a cemetery in Waterfall Road, Southgate, London, run by the London Borough of Enfield. The cemetery was established by the Southgate Burial Board in 1880. There is no chapel at the cemetery but Christ Church, Southgate, Church of England church is adjacent on the other side of Waterfall Road. The cemetery contains the war graves of 92 Commonwealth service personnel, 20 from World War I and 72 from World War II.

== Notable interments ==
- Mary Jane Clarke, suffragette
- William Samuel Glyn-Jones, politician and pharmacist
- Gerald Massey, author
- Thomas Melville, chairman of Southgate Urban District Council
- Charles Frederick Peploe, vicar of Christ Church, Southgate
- Herbie Roberts, professional footballer for Arsenal
- Lionel Keir Robinson, CBE, MC
- George Albert Watts, mayor of St Pancras 1938–39
- Herbert Francis Wauthier, mayor of Southgate 1936–37
- James Edwin Williams, first general secretary of the National Union of Railwaymen
- Frederick Porter Wensley, OBE, KPM, Chief Constable, CID, Metropolitan Police
