= St Pancras South East (London County Council constituency) =

London County Council constituency

- Former constituency for the London County Council

Former constituency
- Created: 1919
- Abolished: 1949
- Member(s): 2
- Created from: St Pancras East and St Pancras South
- Replaced by: Holborn and St Pancras South and St Pancras North

St Pancras South East was a constituency used for elections to the London County Council between 1919 and 1949. The seat shared boundaries with the UK Parliament constituency of the same name.

== Councillors ==
Year	Name	Party	Name	Party
1919	David Davies	Municipal Reform	Ethelind Hopkins	Municipal Reform
1928	Maud Mary Dollar	Labour	Albert Samuels	Labour
1931	Albert Clavering	Municipal Reform	Evan Evans	Municipal Reform
1934	Frank Lawrence Combes	Labour	David Webster	Labour
1948	Iris Bonham	Labour	David Webster	Labour

== Election results ==
1919 London County Council election: St Pancras South East
Party	Candidate	Votes	%	±%
Municipal Reform	Ethelind Hopkins	2,106		
Municipal Reform	David Davies	2,015		
Progressive	Albert William Claremont	1,455		
Progressive	Henry de Rosenbach Walker	1,420		
Majority				
Municipal Reform hold		Swing		
Municipal Reform hold		Swing		

1922 London County Council election: St Pancras South East
Party	Candidate	Votes	%	±%
Municipal Reform	Ethelind Hopkins	5,158	26.8	
Municipal Reform	David Davies	5,114	26.6	
Labour	S. Presbury	2,617	13.6	
Labour	H. Dawson Large	2,613	13.6	
Progressive	Arthur Lewis Leon	1,859	9.7	
Progressive	Alfred Scott	1,856	9.7	
Majority		2,497	13.0	
Municipal Reform hold		Swing		
Municipal Reform hold		Swing		

1925 London County Council election: St Pancras South East
Party	Candidate	Votes	%	±%
Municipal Reform	Ethelind Hopkins	5,473		
Municipal Reform	David Davies	5,289		
Labour	H. Dawson Large	4,314		
Labour	Richard Rees	4,254		
Majority				
Municipal Reform hold		Swing		
Municipal Reform hold		Swing		

1928 London County Council election: St Pancras South East
Party	Candidate	Votes	%	±%
Labour	Maud Mary Dollar	4,849		
Labour	Albert Samuels	4,792		
Municipal Reform	David Davies	4,520		
Municipal Reform	Rupert Frederick William Fincham	4,360		
Liberal	Elizabeth Edwardes	1,157		
Liberal	N. Morton	1,115		
Majority				
Labour gain from Municipal Reform		Swing		
Labour gain from Municipal Reform		Swing		

1931 London County Council election: St Pancras South East
Party	Candidate	Votes	%	±%
Municipal Reform	Albert Clavering	4,971		
Municipal Reform	Evan Evans	4,886		
Labour	Eddie Binks	3,830		
Labour	Albert Samuels	3,810		
Liberal	E. F. Evans	511		
Liberal	W. Paul	335		
Majority				
Municipal Reform gain from Labour		Swing		
Municipal Reform gain from Labour		Swing		

1934 London County Council election: St Pancras South East
Party	Candidate	Votes	%	±%
Labour	Frank Lawrence Combes	5,060		
Labour	David Webster	4,959		
Municipal Reform	Evan Evans	4,594		
Municipal Reform	Albert Clavering	4,573		
Liberal	F. Yoxall	415		
Liberal	E. A. Morton	386		
Majority				
Labour gain from Municipal Reform		Swing		
Labour gain from Municipal Reform		Swing		

1937 London County Council election: St Pancras South East
Party	Candidate	Votes	%	±%
Labour	Frank Lawrence Combes	6,620		
Labour	David Webster	6,479		
Municipal Reform	Evan Evans	5,162		
Municipal Reform	Arthur Gale	5,056		
Majority				
Labour hold		Swing		
Labour hold		Swing		

1946 London County Council election: St Pancras South East
Party	Candidate	Votes	%	±%
Labour	Frank Lawrence Combes	4,522		
Labour	David Webster	4,442		
Conservative	J. E. Davies	2,678		
Conservative	Ronald Gilbey	2,564		
Majority				
Labour hold		Swing		
Labour hold		Swing		
