= Frank Lawrence Combes =

British politician and trade unionist

Frank Lawrence Combes (1886 – 26 September 1948) was a British politician and trade unionist, who served on the London County Council.

Born in Sussex, Combes moved to Kentish Town, where he worked as a plasterer. In 1902, he joined the National Association of Operative Plasterers, and he soon became the secretary of the union's London No.2 branch.

Combes also joined the Labour Party, and in 1909 he was elected to St Pancras Metropolitan Borough Council. He stood unsuccessfully for St Pancras North at the 1922 London County Council election, then in 1934, he won a seat in St Pancras South East.

In 1945/45, Combes additionally served as Mayor of St Pancras. In 1948, he became Vice-Chair of London County Council, but he died in September.

Civic offices
Preceded by J. H. Mitchell	Mayor of St Pancras; 1945–1946	Succeeded by Fred Powe
