= Nathan Robinson (politician) =

British politician

Nathan Robinson (1828 – 9 August 1902) was a British politician.

Born in Holt, Norfolk, Robinson moved with his family to London in 1836. He was involved in the Chartist movement in 1848, and was involved in radical politics for the rest of his life. He worked as a publican, and was also elected to the St Pancras Vestry, serving for twelve years. In 1880, he was elected to the St Pancras Board of Guardians, serving for twelve years as chair of its Workhouse Visiting Committee, then as chair of the entire Board.

At the 1889 London County Council election, Robinson was elected for the Progressive Party in St Pancras East. On the council, he devoted much of his time to the Parks and Asylums committees. He suffered a long illness in the early 1900s, and died from an oedema, while still in office.
