= George Albert Watts =

British justice of the peace, councillor and mayor

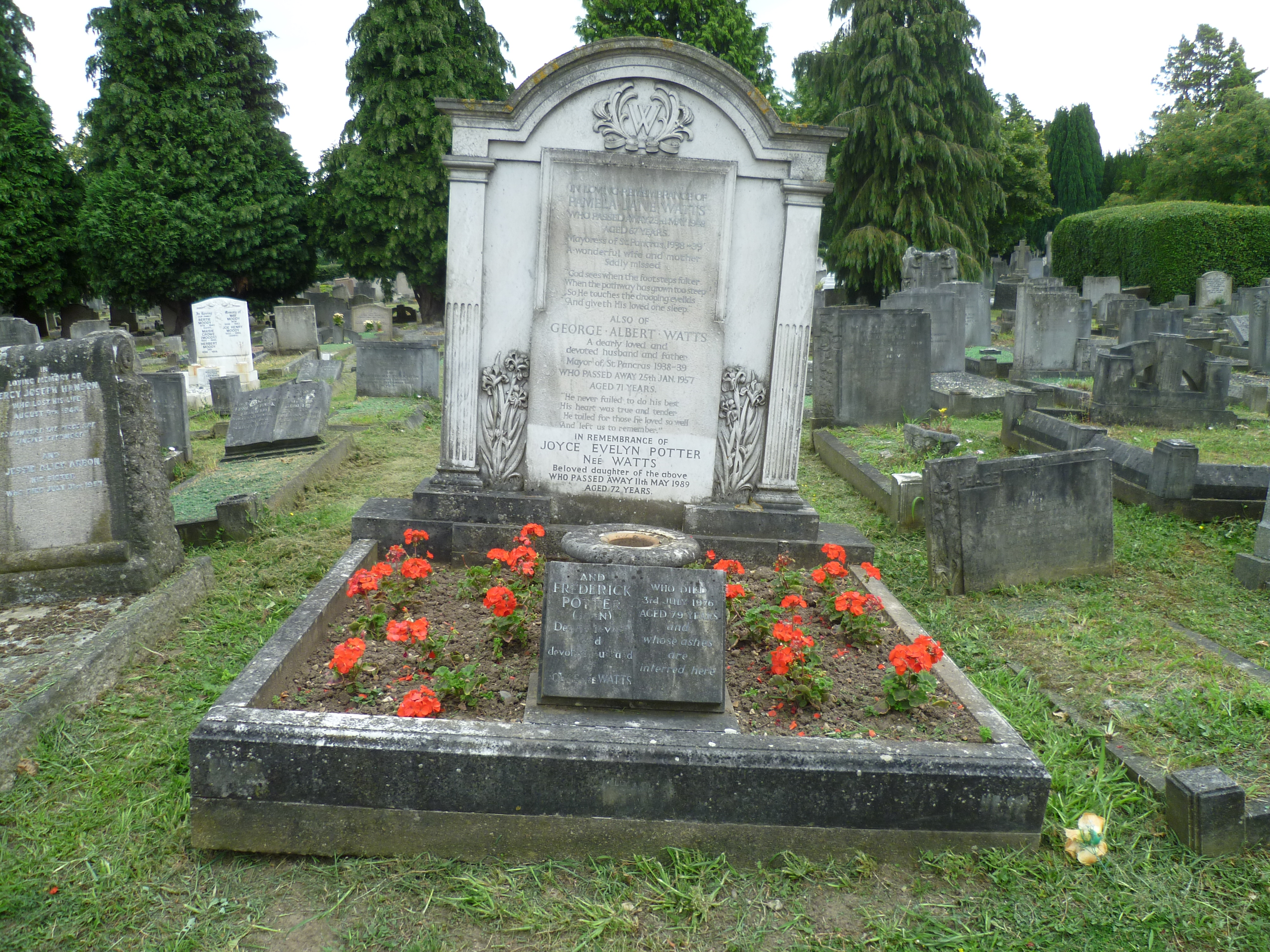
The Watts family grave at Southgate Cemetery.

George Albert Watts JP (16 December 1885 – 25 January 1957) was a British justice of the peace, councillor and the mayor of the Metropolitan Borough of St Pancras, London, from 1938 to 1939. He was born in Finsbury, Clerkenwell, the son of George and Caroline Watts. He is buried in Southgate Cemetery along with his wife, Pamela Jane Watts (died 23, May 1948) and their daughter Joyce Evelyn Potter (died 11 May 1989).
