= Lionel Keir Robinson =

Antiquarian bookseller (1897–1983)

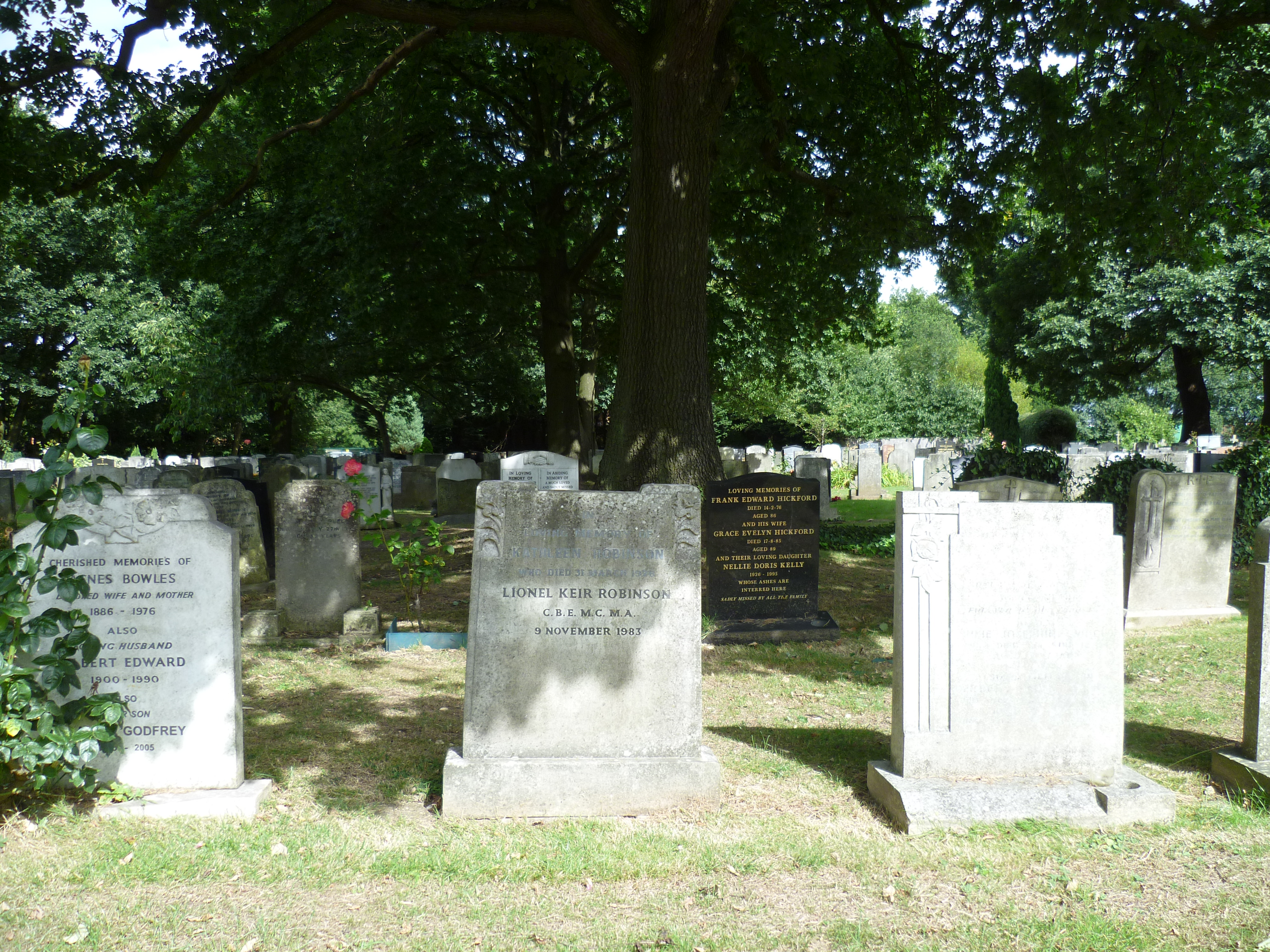
The grave of Lionel Keir Robinson at Southgate Cemetery.

Lionel Keir Robinson CBE MC (1897 – 9 November 1983) was an antiquarian bookseller and president of the Antiquarian Booksellers Association. He was awarded the Military Cross during the First World War for conspicuous gallantry in continuing to perform his duties despite being under fire and having been gassed by the enemy.

== Military service ==
He served in the Royal Garrison Artillery and the 2nd Australian Siege Artillery Battery during the First World War as a Second Lieutenant and in 1918 was awarded the Military Cross for "conspicuous gallantry and devotion to duty". His citation read:

This officer was in a forward observation post for twenty-four hours preceding an enemy attack. Notwithstanding a heavy shell and machine-gun barrage and being badly "gassed" he remained at his post, transmitting valuable information to his battery that enabled them to direct their fire on the enemy in the most effective manner."

He was captured with some Australian soldiers in Belgium and after the war wrote to them in Australia to inquire about their well-being and to say that he had recommended them for a medal.

== Later life ==
After the war, Robinson became an antiquarian bookseller, becoming president of the Antiquarian Booksellers Association from 1938 to 1942. In 1946, he and his brother Philip, raised £20,000 of their own capital and £80,000 from an investment bank to purchase the remainder of the Phillipps Collection of books and manuscripts from Alan Fenwick, inherited from his father Thomas Fenwick and passed down from Sir Thomas Phillipps. (See A. L. Munby, Phillipps Studies Book V and below). From 1960 he lived at Redwalls on the south side of Beech Hill near Beech Hill Park in Hadley Wood, Hertfordshire, when he executed a deed relating to the "residue" of the manuscripts of the nineteenth century bibliomaniac Sir Thomas Phillipps. Between 1946 and 1957 when the Robinson Brothers retired, they owned an antiquarian bookshop in Pall Mall. After retirement, they spent time examining and sorting many of the remaining books from the collection of Thomas Phillipps and sending them to auction. In 1976 he was made a commander of the Order of the British Empire for charity work. He married Kathleen (Kay) Sproat. Robinson died on 9 November 1983 and is buried at Southgate Cemetery with his wife.
