= Charles Frederick Peploe =

English Anglican clergyman

Charles Frederick Peploe

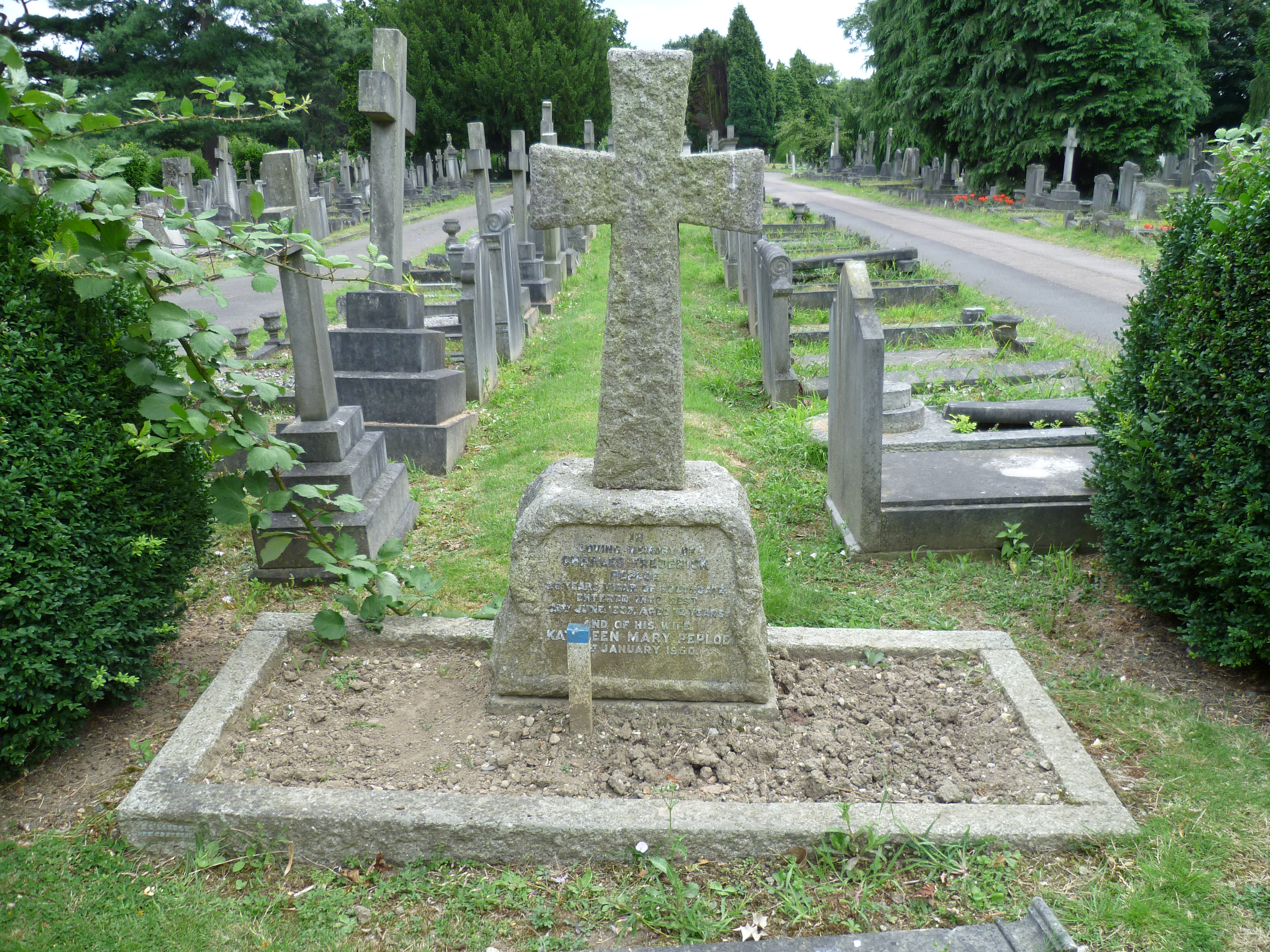
Peploe's grave at Southgate Cemetery.

Rev. Charles Frederick Peploe (10 February 1865 – 25 June 1937) was an English Anglican clergyman who was vicar of Christ Church, Southgate, from 1909–37. His wife, Kathleen, was a campaigner on behalf of British prisoners of war during the First World War.

== Early life and family ==
Charles Frederick Peploe was born in Whitby, Yorkshire in 1865, to George Peploe, an Inland Revenue officer from Peterborough, and Flora McDonald Aidie from Scotland. Peploe studied at Durham University as a member of Hatfield Hall. He received a Master of Arts degree and Licentiate of Theology. Early in life he received an injury in an accident that left him with a permanent disability. He married Kathleen Mary who organised a War Hospital Supply Depot from the vicarage during the First World War and sent parcels of aid to British prisoners of war from whom she received over 300 letters and postcards in reply. In May 1917 she wrote to the editor of The Times lamenting the conditions under which the prisoners were held and the German practice of placing them in the firing line.

== Career ==
Peploe's clerical career was closely associated with the Enfield Deanery. He was first vicar of St. Mark's, Bush Hill Park, before moving to Christ Church, Southgate, in 1909 where he took over from Charles Stookes. He remained at Christ Church until his death in 1937 when he was succeeded by George Stainsby. At Southgate he was instrumental in seeing the first Church House opened in 1934 at a cost of £14,000. It was later sold to become the Southgate Masonic Centre.

== Death and legacy ==
Peploe died on 25 June 1937. His wife Kathleen died on 31 January 1950 and they are buried together at Southgate Cemetery, adjacent to Christ Church, in Waterfall Road, Southgate. Ten years after his death, in 1947, a new oak organ screen was dedicated in his memory at Christ Church.
