= Christ Church, Southgate =

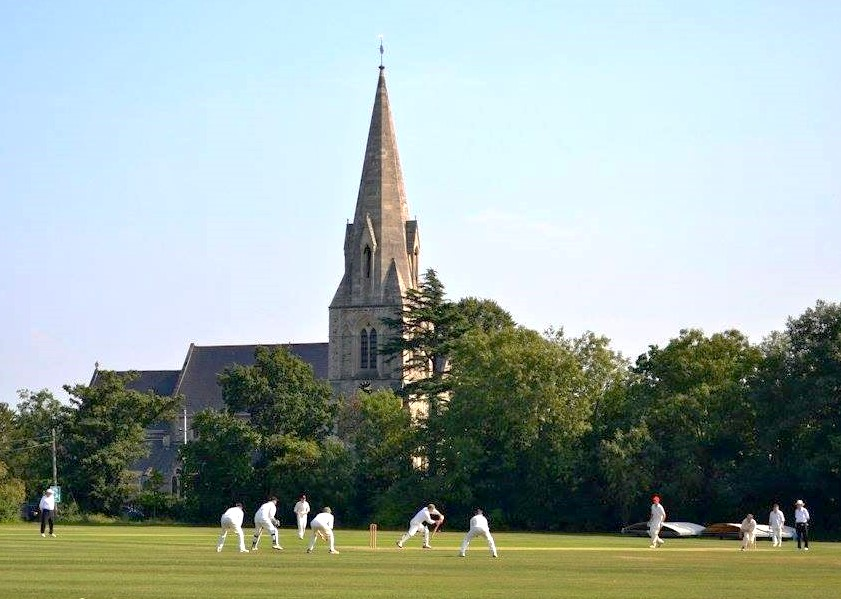
- Christ Church, Southgate, designed by Sir George Gilbert Scott, as seen from The Walker Ground
- Christ Church, Southgate
- 51°37′29″N 0°07′41″W
- Location: Waterfall Road, Southgate, Middlesex, N14 7EG
- Country: England
- Denomination: Church of England
- Churchmanship: Liberal Catholic

History
- Status: Active
- Consecrated: July 17, 1862

Architecture
- Functional status: Parish church
- Heritage designation: Grade II* listed
- Architect: Sir George Gilbert Scott

Administration
- Diocese: Diocese of London
- Archdeaconry: Archdeaconry of Hampstead
- Deanery: Enfield
- Parish: Christ Church Southgate

Clergy
- Bishop(s): The Rt Revd Rob Wickham, Bishop of Edmonton
- Vicar: Fr Chrichton Limbert

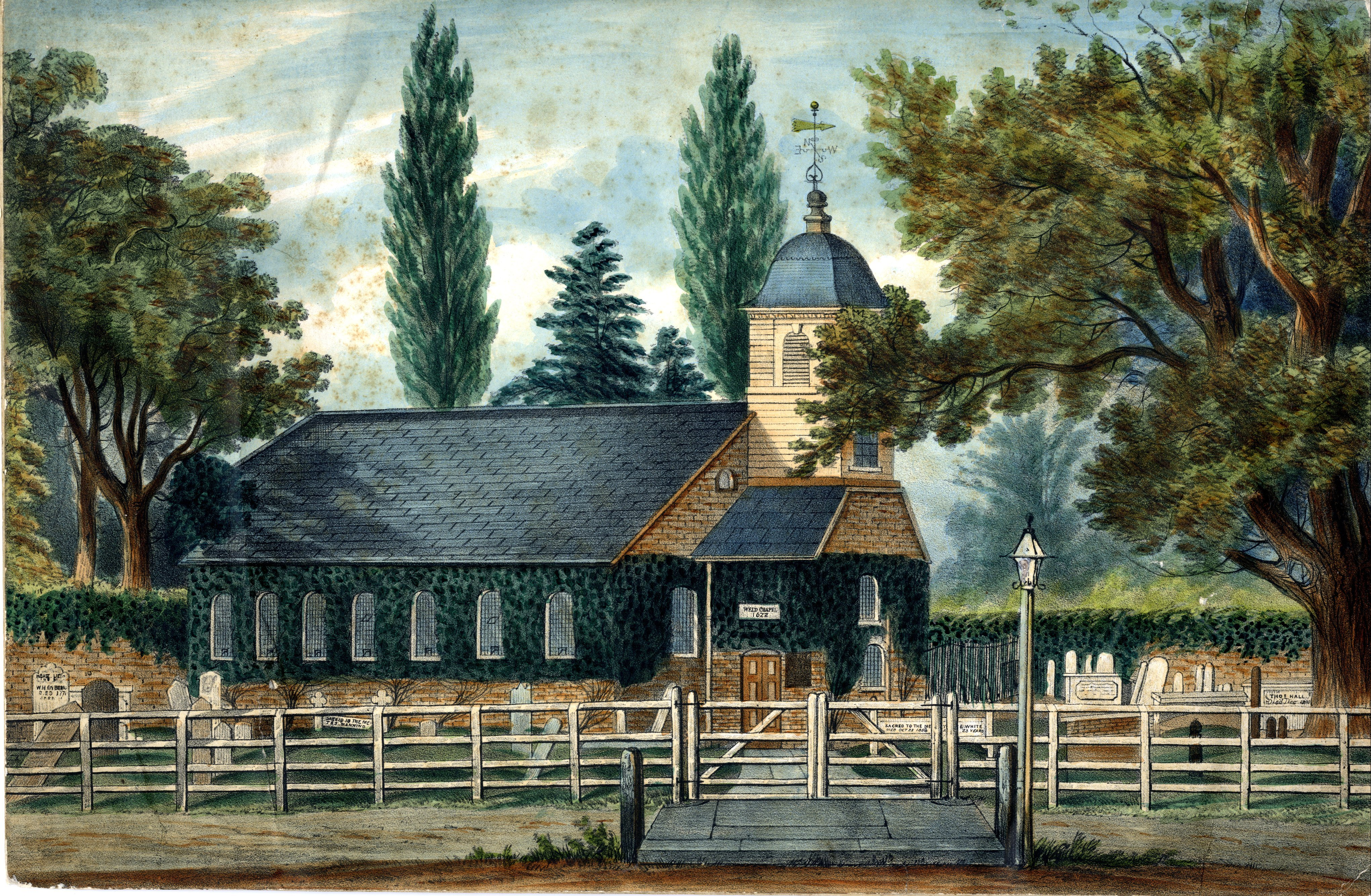
The Weld Chapel

Christ Church, Southgate, is a Church of England parish church in Waterfall Road, Southgate, London. It describes itself as a "liberal catholic Church of England parish". The building is grade II* listed with Historic England. In 2014 the church registered as an Inclusive Church. The church choir makes regular recordings and tours as well as supporting worship on Sundays at 10am and at Choral Evensong at 6.30pm.

== History ==
In 1615, Sir John Weld, owner of the Arnos Grove estate, established the Weld Chapel, located just west of Christ Church, at which local people were allowed to worship. In the 19th century, the Rev. James Baird, a minister of the Weld Chapel who had married into the Walker family who then owned Arnos Grove house, saw that the chapel was too small and dilapidated for current needs, and the Walker family donated land on which Christ Church was built. The architect was Sir George Gilbert Scott (father of George Gilbert Scott Jr.). The church was consecrated by John Jackson, then Bishop of Lincoln and later Bishop of London, on 17 July 1862.

The Weld Chapel was demolished in 1863 and its site remains marked in the old churchyard outside the west door of the church.

== Choir ==
Christ Church Southgate has a strong musical tradition, dating back to the time of the Weld Chapel. The choir of Christ Church Southgate has been in existence since the first service held in Christ Church, when the choir was augmented by choristers from St Paul's Cathedral. Originally a choir of men and boys, it is now a mixed choir of adults and junior members. Notable alumni include the acclaimed organist and choral conductor Martin Neary. The choir sings for the main Parish Eucharist every Sunday at 10.00am and Choral Evensong each Sunday at 6.30pm, performs regular concerts and tours to cathedrals around the UK and Europe.

== Windows ==
The church is home to the largest collection of Pre-Raphaelite stained glass windows in London by Morris, Marshall Faulkner & Company (later Morris & Co) with work ranging from 1861 to 1913 including windows by Edward Burne-Jones, Dante Gabriel Rossetti, Ford Madox Brown, Philip Webb, John Henry Dearle and William Morris himself. Other features include fine windows by Clayton & Bell. The Faith & Hope window in the nave of the church, designed by Edward Burne-Jones was installed in memory of Letitia Catherine Hayes, sister of the British Imperial Statesman John Laird Mair Lawrence, 1st Baron Lawrence, who resided at Southgate House. The great east window by Clayton & Bell was installed in 1862 in memory of Vincent Figgins Jnr, who continued the work of his father Vincent Figgins the type-founder.

== Reredos ==
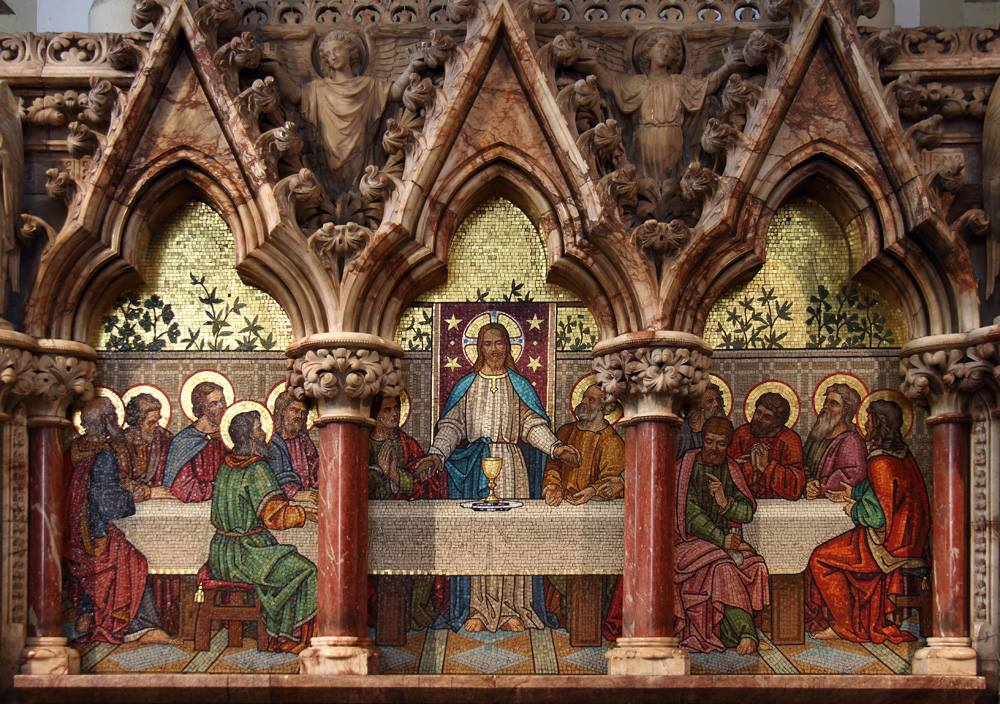
Reredos by Salviati of Venice

The reredos, installed in 1868, is a fine mosaic by Antonio Salviati depicting the Last Supper. The cartoon is by John Clayton of Clayton & Bell and is nearly identical to the Salviati reredos in Westminster Abbey, installed a year earlier.

== The Walker family ==
The burial vault of the Walkers of Southgate is located in the churchyard, near the west door. The vault contains the remains of all seven of the famous cricketing Walker brothers. The churchyard also contains the vault of the Taylor family of Grovelands House who, with the Walker family, established the Taylor Walker Brewing Company. The Lady Chapel was decorated in 1905–06 with wall paintings by Percy Bacon Brothers in memory of Issac and Sophia Walker of Arnos Grove and their children.

== War memorials ==
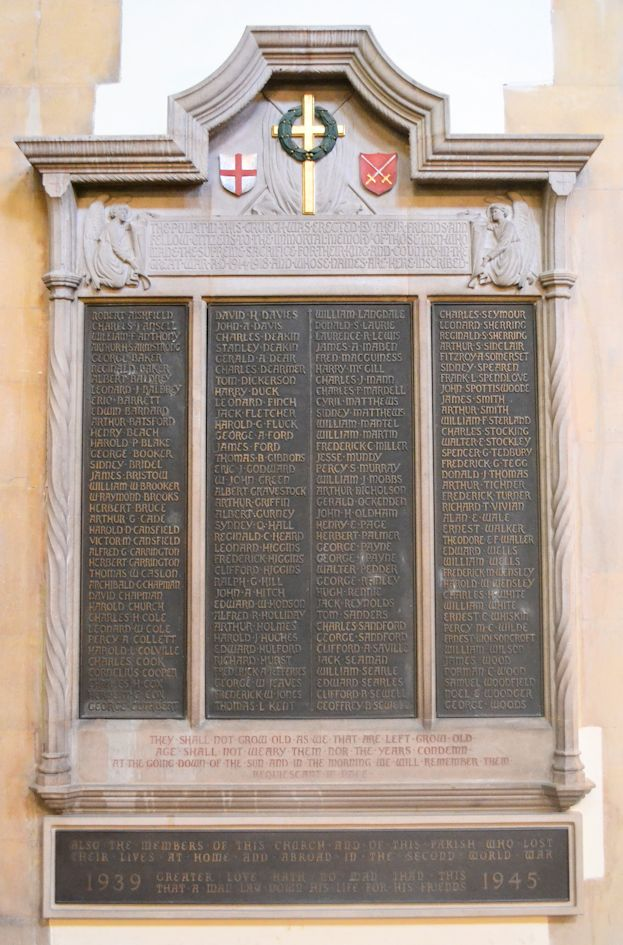
War Memorial by Charles Marriott Oldrid Scott

The First World War memorial inside the church was designed by Charles Marriott Oldrid Scott, the grandson of George Gilbert Scott, following a design competition. It lists 146 men from the parish and includes the two sons of the famous detective Frederick Porter Wensley who lived in Powys Lane. Information on some of the men listed can be found in a booklet produced by the church. The Memorial was installed in 1921. Inside the church hangs a Tricolore presented to Group Captain Alfred Kitchiner 'Ken' Gatward and the Southgate Branch of the Royal British Legion at a ceremony in Broomfield Park in 1949 to commemorate Operation Squabble.

== Clergy ==
Incumbents including the Weld Chapel:

- 1615 – 1710 Unknown
- 1710 – 1722 Samuel Holcombe
- 1722 – 1730 James Kilner
- 1730 – 1743 John Harrison
- 1743 – 1774 Luke Morgan
- 1774 – 1784 Henry Shepherd
- 1784 – 1786 Thomas Harding
- 1786 – 1813 Thomas Winbolt
- 1813 – 1829 Dawson Warren
- 1829 – 1852 Thomas Sale
- 1852 – 1855 Vincent Stanton
- 1855 – 1858 Trevor Lloyd
- 1858 – 1893 James Baird
- 1893 – 1898 Cyril Wilson
- 1898 – 1905 John Beardall
- 1905 – 1909 Charles Stookes
- 1909 – 1937 Charles Frederick Peploe
- 1937 – 1951 George W. Stainsby
- 1951 – 1958 Charles Plummer
- 1958 – 1978 Murray Mcleod
- 1978 – 1986 Brian Mountford
- 1986 – 1995 Christopher Foster
- 1995 – 2003 David Hoyle
- 2003 – 2015 Peter Jackson
- 2015 to date Chrichton Limbert

Angela Berners-Wilson, the first woman ordained a priest in the Church of England, served as deaconess at Christ Church between 1979 and 1982. Other notable curates have included John Yates.

== Gallery ==
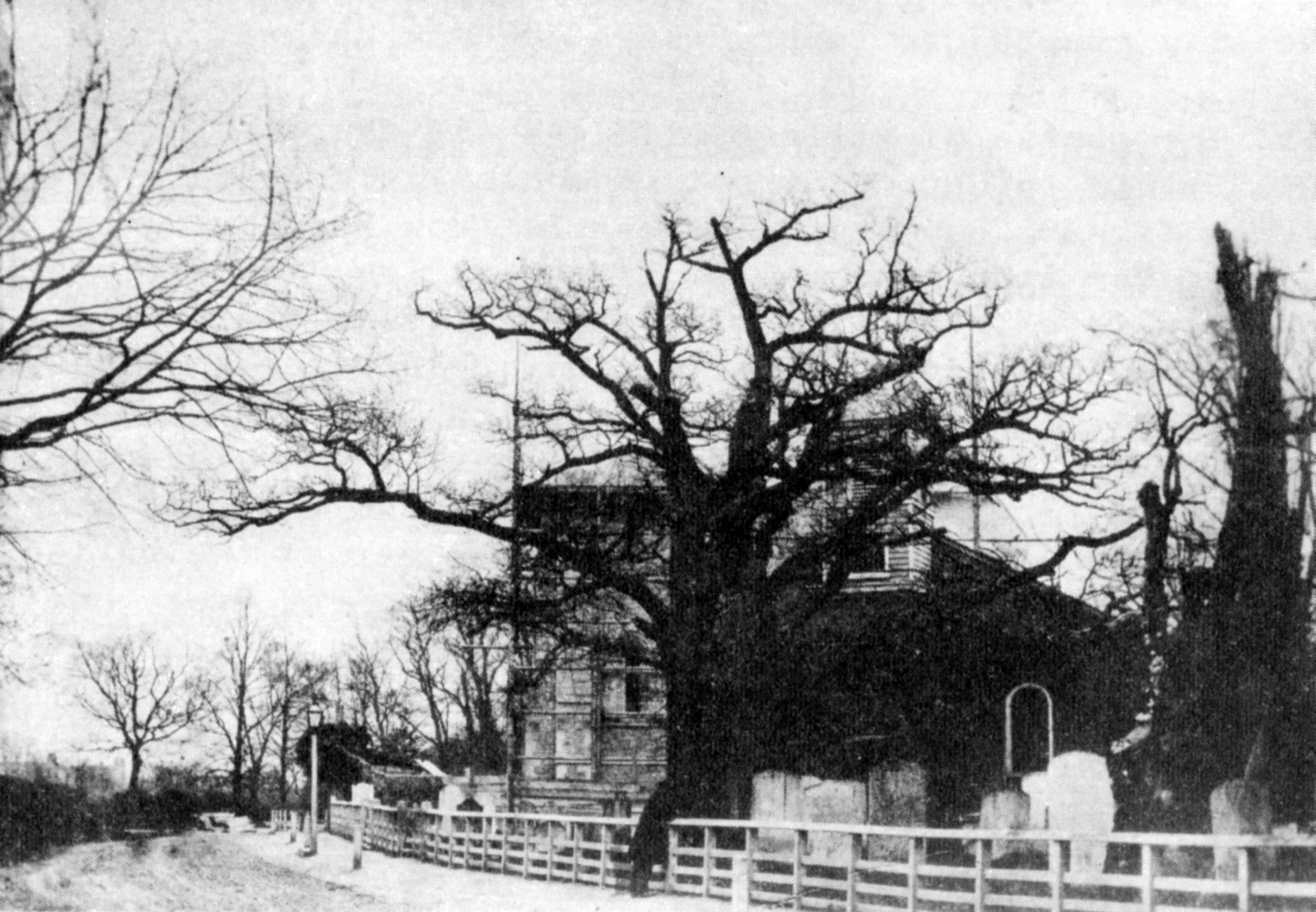
The Weld Chapel (right) in 1862 during the construction of Christ Church

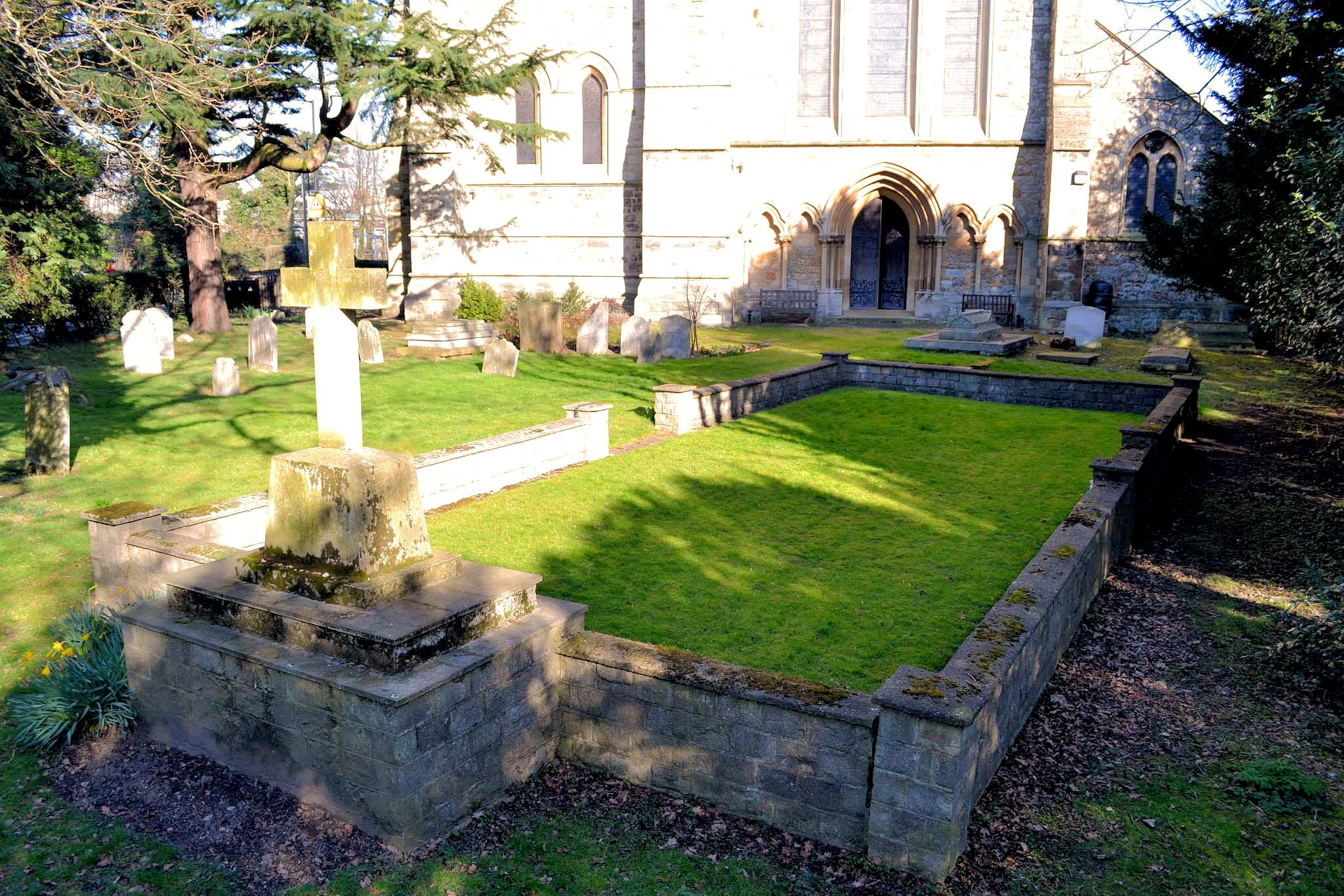
Footprint of the Weld Chapel (1615-1861) now a Garden of Remembrance (built 1967)

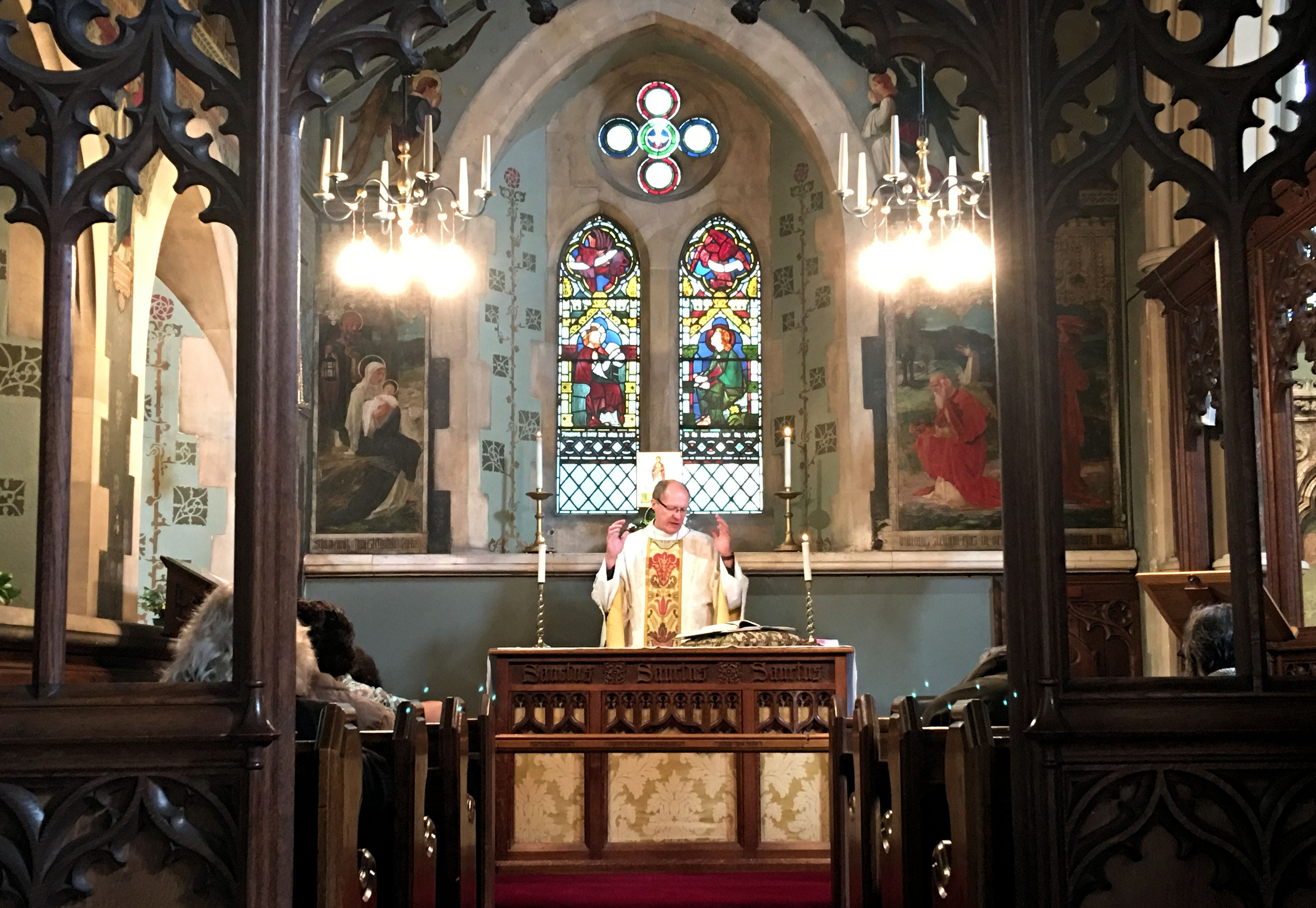
Lady Chapel, Christ Church Southgate (reordered 1905) with wall paintings by Percy Bacon Brothers and windows by Morris, Marshall, Faulkner & Company

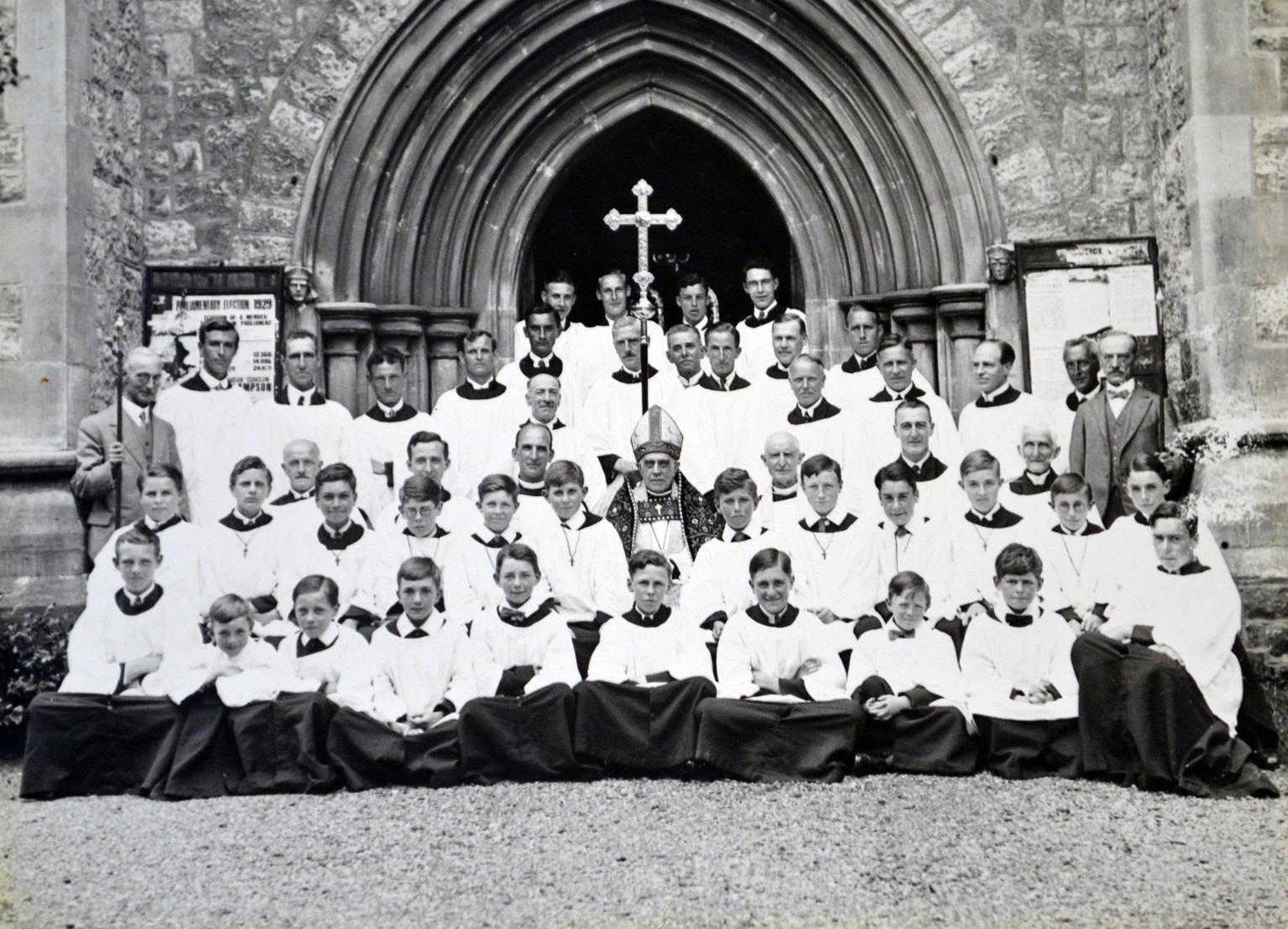
The Choir of Christ Church Southgate in 1929

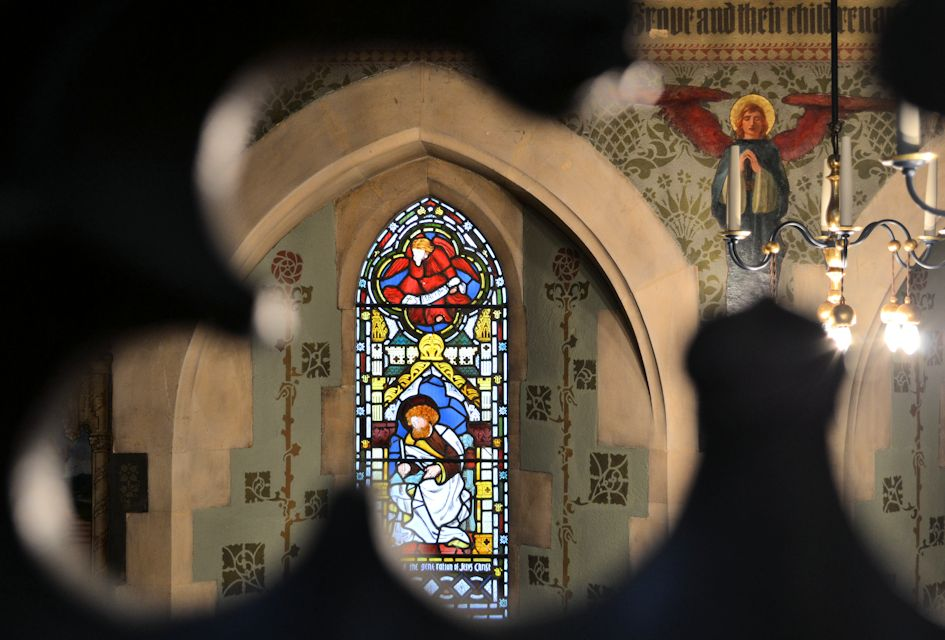
St Matthew by William Morris (reputedly a self portrait)

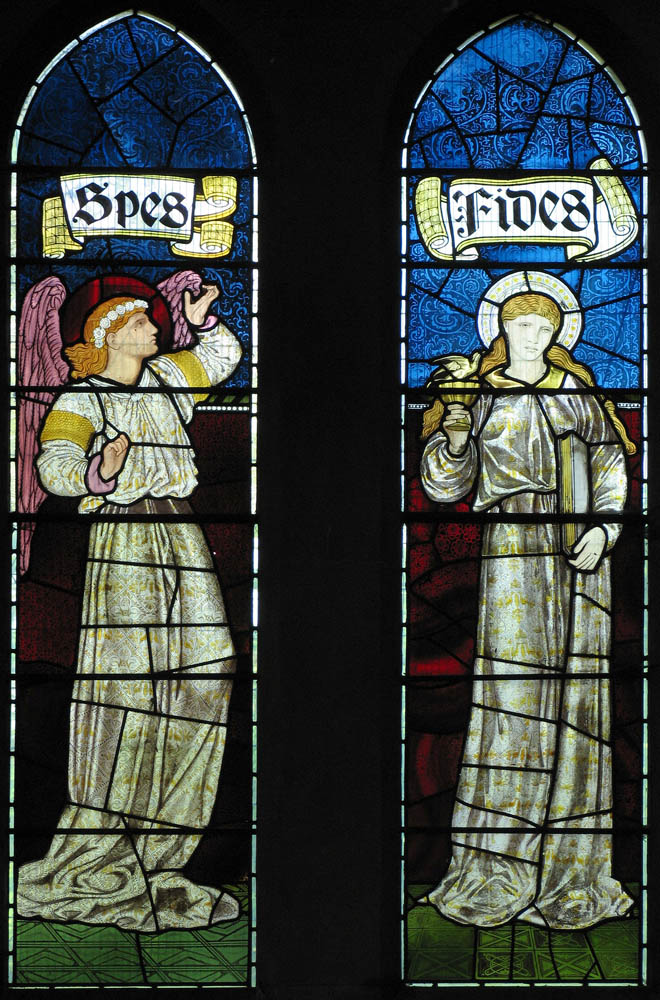
Hope and Faith window by Edward Burne Jones

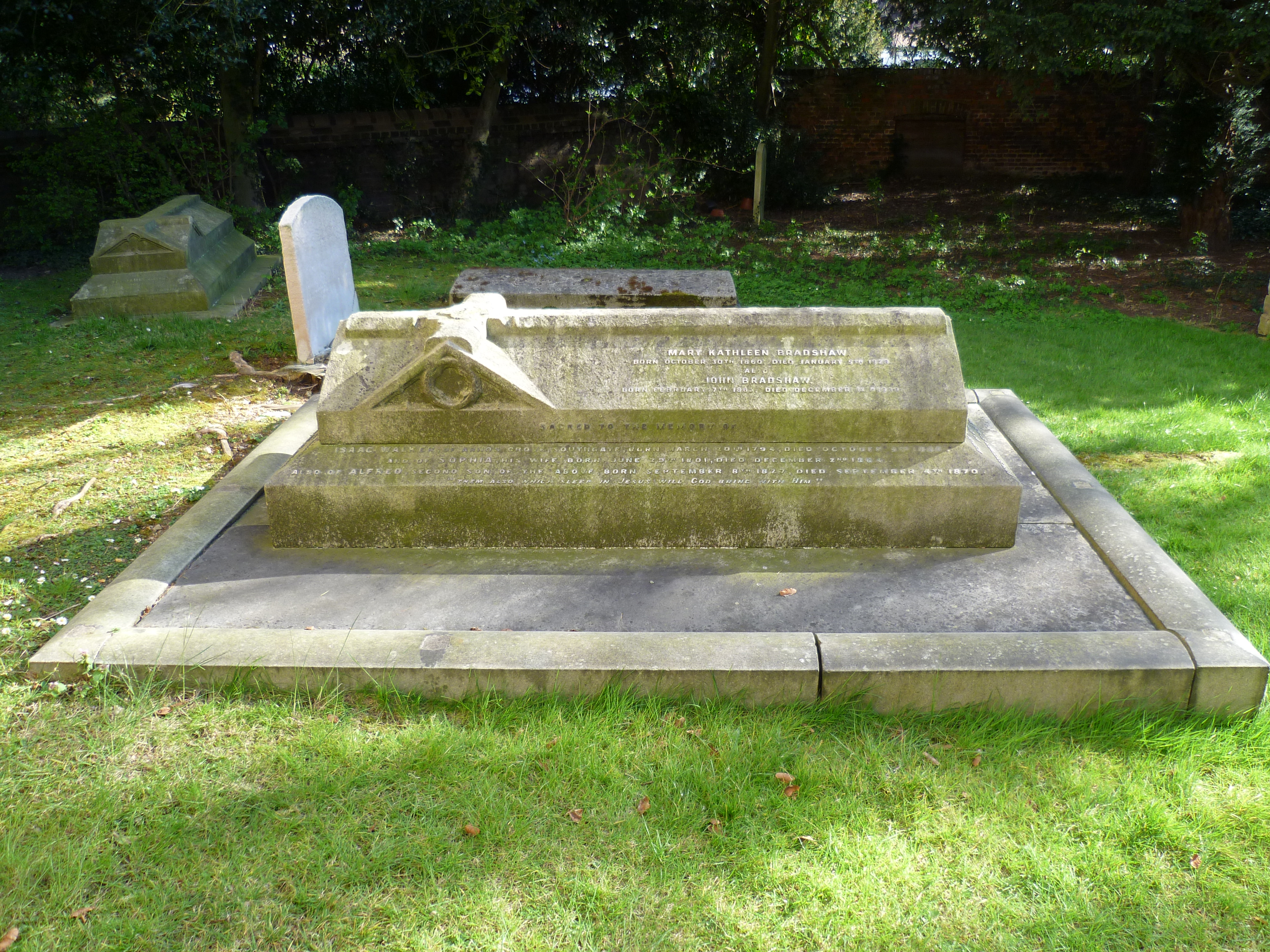
The Walker Family Vault
