= Thomas Melville (Southgate) =

Thomas Melville

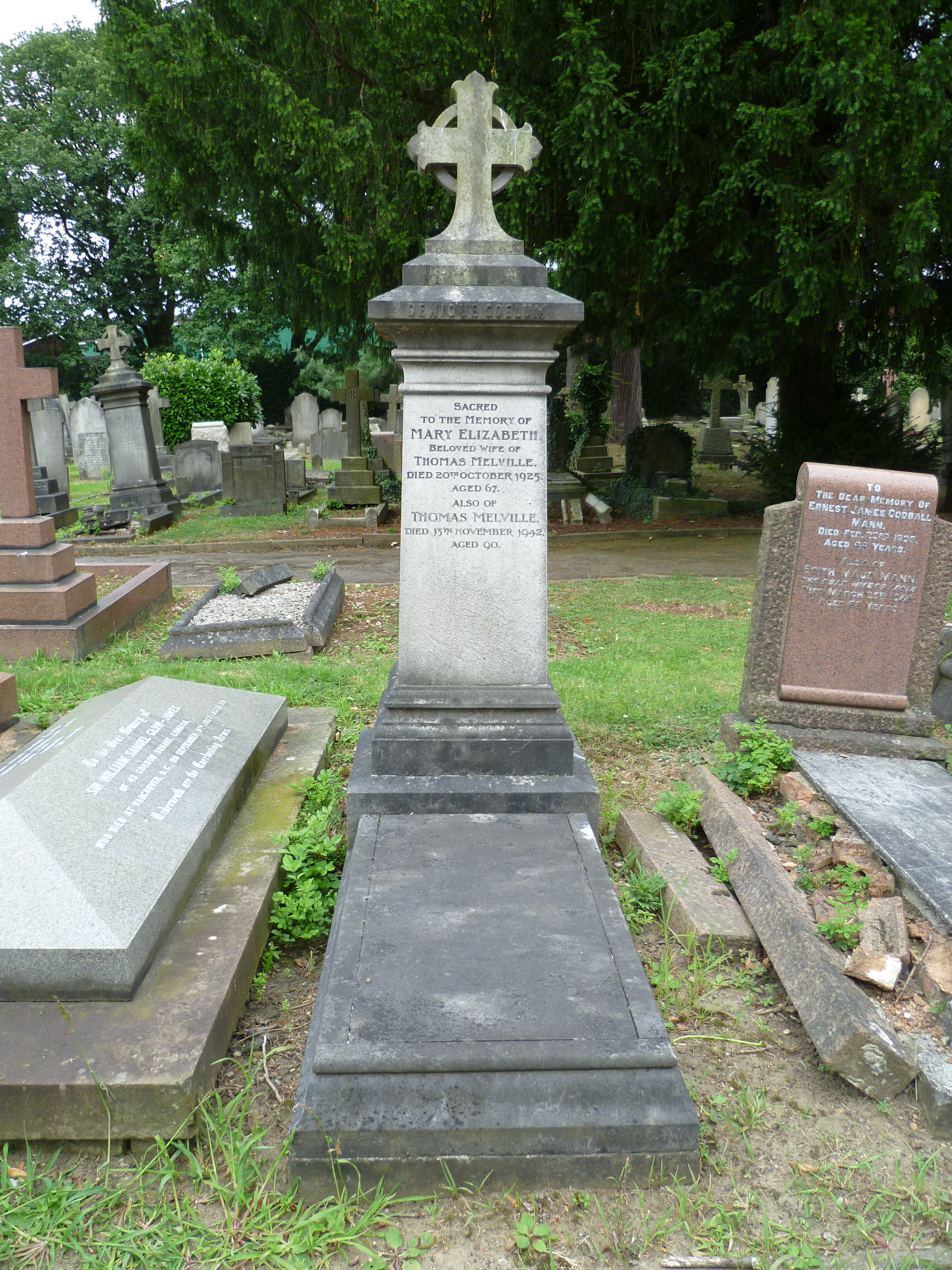
Thomas Melville's grave at Southgate Cemetery

Thomas Melville (7 October 1852 – 13 November 1942) was a Scottish Presbyterian resident in London who was a member of Southgate Urban District Council and chairman of the council during the First World War.

== Early life and family ==
Thomas Melville was born in Edinburgh to Thomas Melville and his wife, Agnes Allan. He moved to London, where he married Mary Elizabeth Turner (died 20 October 1925) in 1881. They lived in Tottenham before moving to Southgate prior to 1891. He worked as a tobacco merchant.

== Local affairs ==
Melville was instrumental in establishing the Presbyterian Church in Fox Lane, Palmers Green, which opened in 1914, and attracted a large number of emigrant Scots to the area. The church was demolished in the 1980s. He was a member of Southgate Urban District Council and chairman of the council during the First World War. He resided at Old Park House, built for the Dowcra family in 1833 and part of the Old Park Estate.

== Death ==
Melville died on 13 November 1942 and is buried along with his wife at Southgate Cemetery.
