= Kinematograph Weekly =

British film trade newspaper

Cover of Kine Weekly, 3 March 1966

Kinematograph Weekly, popularly known as Kine Weekly, was a trade paper catering to the British film industry between 1889 and 1971.

== Etymology ==
The word Kinematograph was derived from the Greek ' Kinumai ', (to move, to be in motion, to go); and, from ' Grapho ', (to write, to inscribe); in the sense of meaning of ' writing ' in light and in motion.

== History ==
Kinematograph Weekly was founded in 1889 as the monthly publication Optical Magic Lantern and Photographic Enlarger. In 1907 it was renamed Kinematograph Weekly, containing trade news, advertisements, reviews, exhibition advice, and reports of regional and national meetings of trade organisations such as the Cinematograph Exhibitors' Association and the Kinema Renters' Society. It was first published by pioneering film enthusiast, industrialist and printing entrepreneur E. T. Heron. In 1914 it published its first annual publication for the film industry, the Kinematograph Yearbook, Program Diary and Directory.

Kinematograph Weekly was owned by the periodical publisher Odhams. Towards the latter part of its run it was published by Odhams' subsidiary Longacre Press. This was the name Odhams had given to Hultons—publisher of Picture Post (the magazine which pioneered photojournalism in the UK) and of the famous Eagle comic among other titles—when it took over that company in 1960. In 1970, Odhams itself was taken over by IPC Specialist and Professional Press Ltd. The title was sold to British and American Film Holdings Ltd in September 1971, which merged it with rival film-trade paper Today's Cinema; this, in turn, was relaunched in September 1975 as Screen International, which is now owned and published by Media Business Insight.

The issues of Kinematograph Weekly provide an invaluable record of the development of the British film and television industries, and are widely studied by researchers. In particular, its published annual polls provide the most complete British box-office records available.

A partial online index of issues – covering the period 1955 to the end of the publication in 1971, plus material from the late 1890s, early 1915, 1943 to mid-1945, and January to June 1954 – has been produced by the British Cinema History Research Project, based at the University of East Anglia. It is also available at the British Newspaper Archive.
