= Frederick Burrows =

British Indian politician

Sir Frederick Burrows GCSI GCIE MSM DL JP
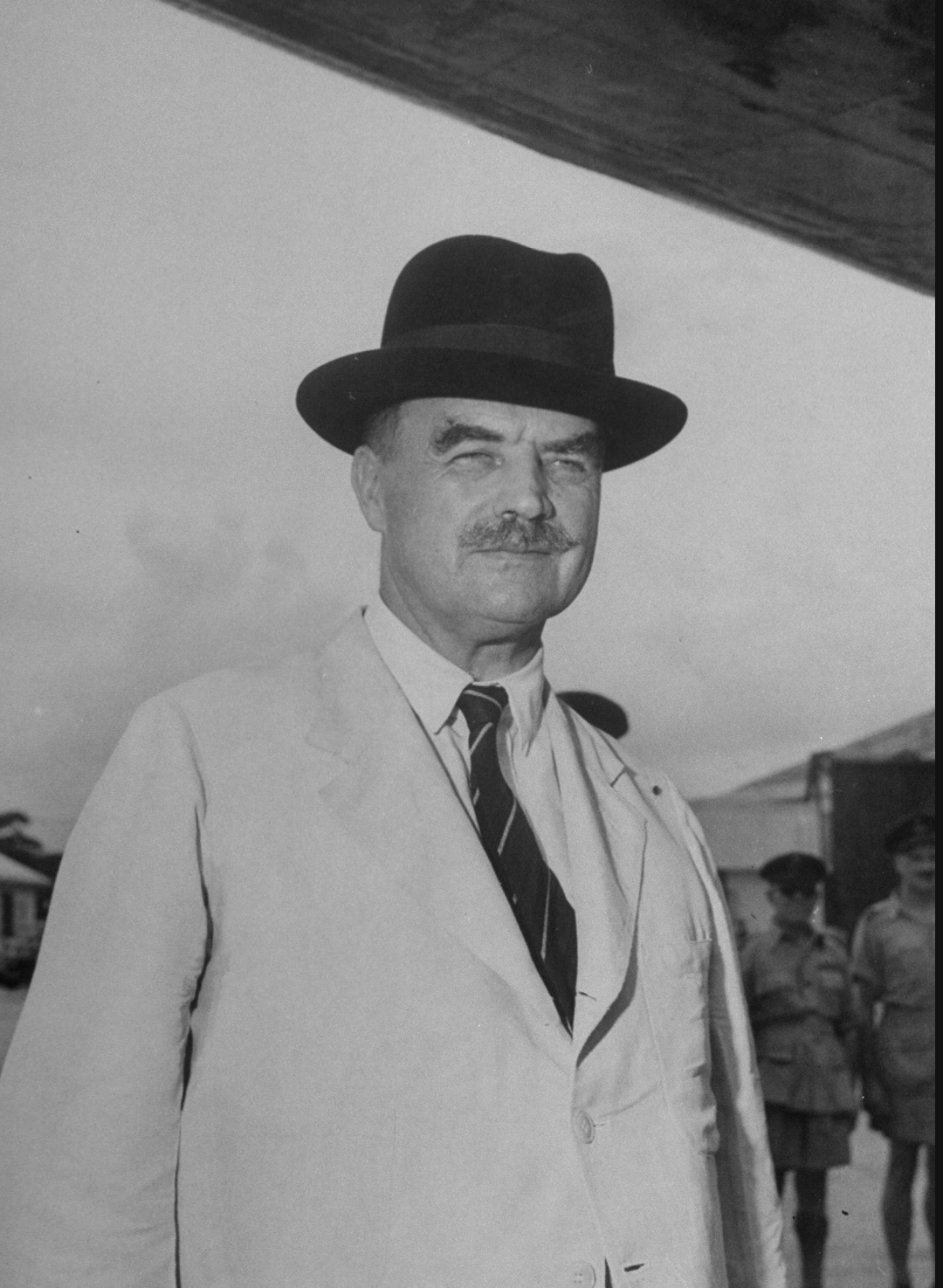

Governor of the Bengal Presidency
- In office 19 February 1946 – 15 August 1947
- Preceded by: The Lord Casey
- Succeeded by: Office dissolved

Personal details
- Born: 3 July 1887
- Died: 23 April 1973 (aged 85)

Sir Frederick John Burrows GCSI GCIE MSM DL JP (3 July 1887 – 23 April 1973) was a British trade unionist who served as the last British Governor of Bengal during the British Raj in India.

== Biography ==
He was Governor of Bengal from 19 February 1946 to 14 August 1947. He was against the partition of Bengal. Burrows was a former Ross railway man and he was the president of the National Union of Railwaymen, the union representing railway workers in England.

Sir Adrian Carton de Wiart records: "He had endeared himself to the Burrah Sahibs of Calcutta (Kolkata) with one of his first speeches when, alluding to his modest beginning on the railway, he said, 'When you gentlemen were huntin' and shootin', I was shuntin' and hootin'. He seemed to me to be far more proud of having been a sergeant-major in the Grenadier Guards in the First World War than he was of being Governor of Bengal."

Political offices
Preceded by Richard Gardiner Casey	Governor of Bengal; 1946–1947	Succeeded by –
Trade union offices
Preceded by J. H. Potts	President of the National Union of Railwaymen; 1942–1945	Succeeded by Eddie Binks
