= Eddie Binks =

John Edward Binks (3 May 1887 – 18 July 1963) was a British trade unionist and politician, who served as President of the National Union of Railwaymen, and as an alderman on the London County Council.

Born in Islington, Binks' father died when Eddie was only six years old, and he was later brought up by an aunt and uncle. He left school around the age of thirteen and became an office clerk, then when he was sixteen moved to work with the Midland Railway at Walthamstow, acting as a weighbridge clerk. He worked in a variety of jobs for the company, around London, before becoming a checker at St Pancras Goods Station.

In 1913, the National Union of Railwaymen (NUR) was founded, and Binks was elected as assistant secretary of its Kentish Town branch, the union's largest branch. In 1922, he was elected to the Local Department Committee and the Sectional Council, and in 1925 he became the branch secretary, also winning election to the union's executive. As early as 1933 he was nominated as the union's president, and he served as chair and then secretary of the employees' side of Council No.4. He eventually won the post of President of the NUR in 1945, serving a three-year term. As president, he led a union delegation to the Soviet Union, represented the union at numerous international conferences, and argued for a single union of railway workers, and the nationalisation of the British railways. His term also saw the election of a Labour Party government, and Binks was strongly supportive, winning election to the party's National Executive Committee.

At the 1931 London County Council election, Binks stood for the Labour Party in St Pancras South East, but was not elected. However, in 1941 he was appointed to the council as an alderman, serving until 1946.

When his term of office ended, Binks found work with the goods section at Broad Street railway station, then with the Railway Executive, where he co-ordinated goods traffic around London. In 1955, he was a founder member of the Southern Area Board, and he also served on its successor, the Southern Railway Board.

Trade union offices
Preceded by Frederick Burrows	President of the National Union of Railwaymen; 1945–1948	Succeeded by William Tindall Potter
