= Herbert Francis Wauthier =

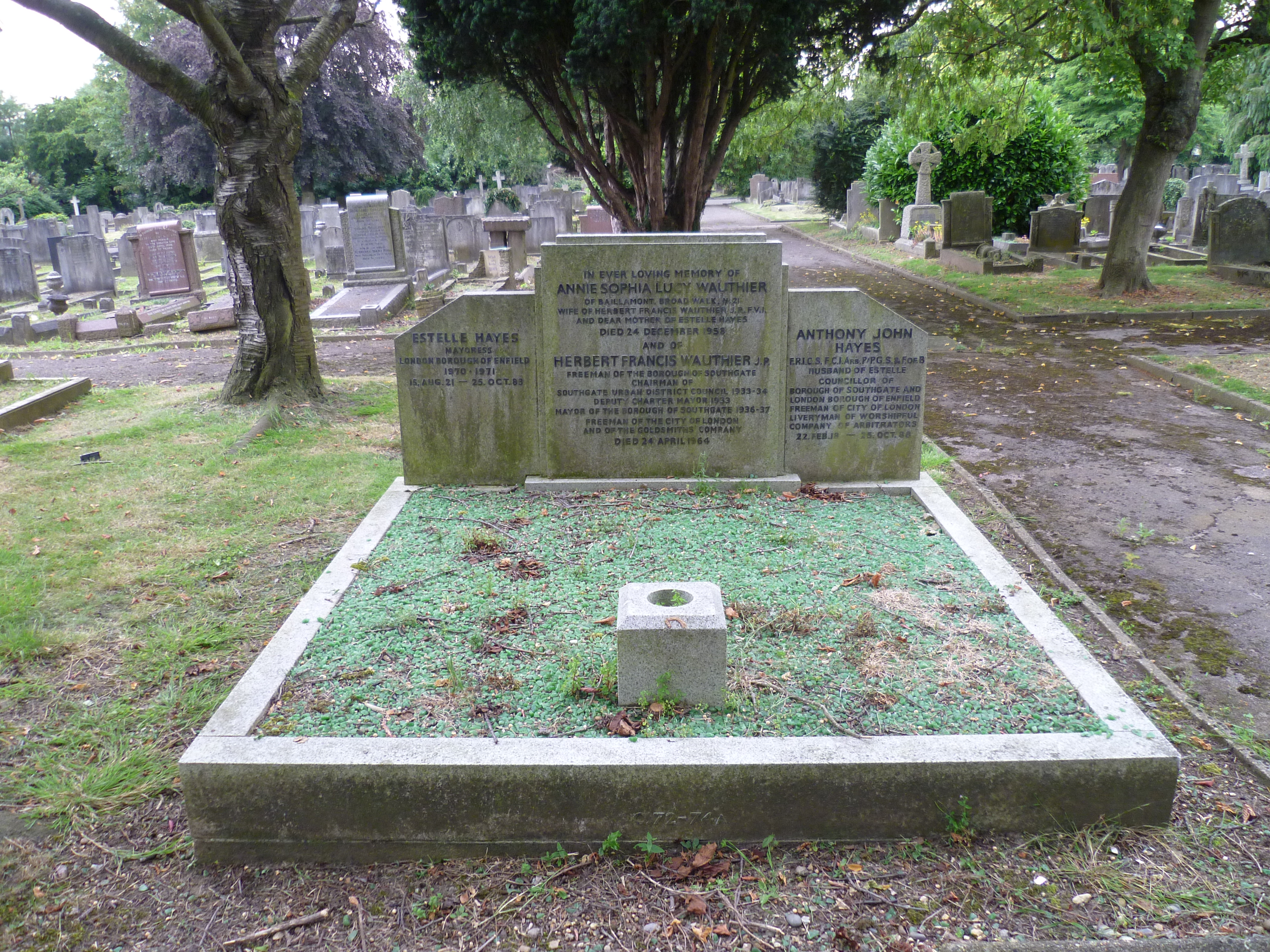
The Wauthier family grave in Southgate Cemetery.

Herbert Francis Wauthier JP (10 March 1881 – 24 April 1964) was an English engraver known for his bookplate designs. He was also mayor of the borough of Southgate (1936–37), and a freeman of the City of London.

== Family ==
Wauthier was born in Holborn, London, London. He married Annie Sophia Lucy Luscombe in the Islington district of London in 1907. They had a daughter, Estelle (1921–83), who was mayoress of the London Borough of Enfield 1970–71.

== Career ==
Wauthier was in partnership with Sidney James Hunt (died 30 December 1940) at F. Osborne & Co. Ltd., which later became Wauthier Osborne Guild Ltd. Wauthier was the executor of Hunt's will.

He was also a justice of the peace, a freeman of the Borough of Southgate, chairman of Southgate Urban District Council (1933–34), mayor of the borough of Southgate 1936–37, and a freeman of the City of London and of the Goldsmiths' Company.

== Death ==
Wauthier died on 24 April 1964. He is buried in Southgate Cemetery with his wife Annie (died 24 December 1958), his daughter Estelle, and her husband Anthony John Hayes.
