= Howell Idris =

Welsh politician and chemical manufacturer

Howell Idris, circa 1905.

Thomas Howell Williams Idris (5 August 1842 – 10 February 1925), known as Howell Idris, was a Welsh Liberal Party politician and chemical manufacturer.

== Background ==
Born Pembrokeshire, 2nd son of Benjamin Williams; assumed additional surname of Idris by deed poll, 1893; m 1873, Emeline, d of John Trevena, Pembroke Dock; five s one d.

== Political career ==
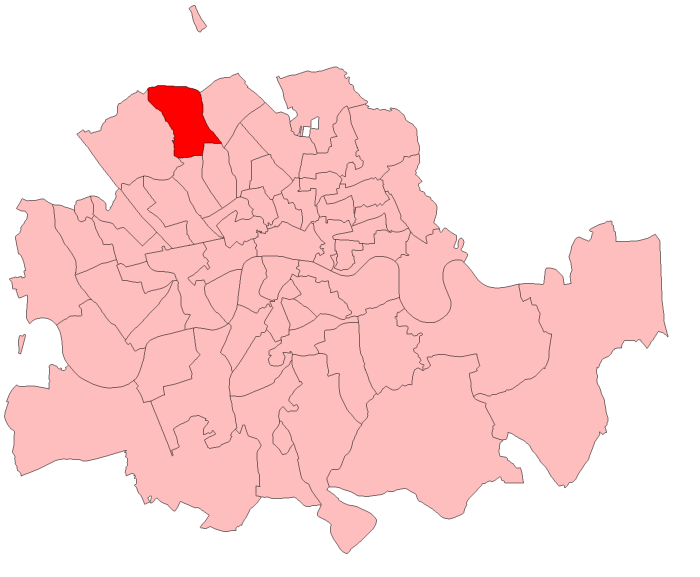
St Pancras North in the Metropolitan area, showing boundaries used from 1885 to 1918

He was an ardent Welsh Nationalist. His nonconformist background ensured that he favoured Welsh disestablishment. He was an advocate of industrial Profit sharing for workers, which he practised in his own company, initiating a profit sharing scheme in addition to wages.

He was elected to the London County Council (LCC) at the inaugural elections of 1889. He was elected to represent St Pancras North for the Progressive Party. He served as Chairman of the Water, Main Drainage and Rivers Committee. He was re-elected until standing down in 1898. He also served as a member of the London Water Board and the Thames and Lea Conservancy Boards.

At the 1892 General Election he stood as Liberal candidate for Denbigh Boroughs. At the 1900 General Election he stood as Liberal candidate for Chester.

In August 1902, after a four-year break, he was elected again to the LCC for the Progressive Party in the by-election for St Pancras East. He was re-elected in 1904 and stood down in 1907. During this period he was also a member of St Pancras Borough Council, and served as the borough's Mayor from 1903 to 1904. He served as a justice of the peace in Merioneth and London. He became the first President of the Council of the Garden City Association.

At the 1906 General Election he stood as Liberal candidate for Flint Boroughs, his third attempt to enter parliament, and this time he was successful, winning the seat with an 11% majority over the Conservative candidate John Eldon Banks. He served just one parliamentary term before standing down in January 1910. He served as High Sheriff for Merioneth from 1912 to 1913.

== Business career ==
Director First Garden City, Ltd. Chemist and mineral water manufacturer. He was President of the British Pharmaceutical Conference of 1903–04. President of Public Pharmacists Association; Fellow of Chemical Society; Member of Society of Chemical Industry. Freeman of City of London.

Parliament of the United Kingdom
| Preceded by Herbert Lewis | Member of Parliament for Flint Boroughs; 1906 – January 1910 | Succeeded by James Woolley Summers |
