= St Pancras North (London County Council constituency) =

London County Council constituency

- Former constituency for the London County Council

Former constituency
- Created: 1889
- Abolished: 1965
- Members: 2 (to 1949); 3 (from 1949)

St Pancras North was a constituency used for elections to the London County Council between 1889 and the council's abolition in 1965. The seat shared boundaries with the UK Parliament constituency of the same name.

== Councillors ==
| Year | Name | Party | Name | Party | Name | Party |
|---|---|---|---|---|---|---|
| 1889 | Howell Idris | Progressive | Charles Lee Lewes | Progressive | Two seats until 1949 | |
| 1891 | Howell Idris | Progressive | William James Wetenhall | Moderate | Two seats until 1949 | |
| 1898 | Howell Idris | Progressive | David Waterlow | Progressive | Two seats until 1949 | |
| 1901 | Herbert Wilberforce | Progressive | David Waterlow | Progressive | Two seats until 1949 | |
| 1904 | Robert Milne Beaton | Progressive | David Waterlow | Progressive | Two seats until 1949 | |
| 1910 | Arthur Lewis Leon | Progressive | Thomas Frederick Hobson | Progressive | Two seats until 1949 | |
| 1919 | John Hunter Harley | Progressive | William Lloyd Taylor | Progressive | Two seats until 1949 | |
| 1922 | Alice Elliot | Municipal Reform | Ian Fraser | Municipal Reform | Two seats until 1949 | |
| 1925 | Alice Elliot | Municipal Reform | Alexander Muir Shand | Municipal Reform | Two seats until 1949 | |
| 1931 | Lilian Cadman | Municipal Reform | Alfred Davies | Municipal Reform | Two seats until 1949 | |
| 1934 | Sidney Bolsom | Municipal Reform | Alfred Davies | Municipal Reform | Two seats until 1949 | |
| 1937 | George House | Labour | Harry Smith | Labour | Two seats until 1949 | |
| 1949 | Iris Bonham | Labour | Shaikh Ghisaud Dean | Labour | Evelyn Denington | Labour |
| 1958 | Grace Lee | Labour | Frederick Lionel Tonge | Labour | Evelyn Denington | Labour |

== Election results ==
1889 London County Council election: St Pancras East
| Party | Candidate | Votes | % | ±% |
|---|---|---|---|---|
| Progressive | Howell Idris | 1,536 | | |
| Progressive | Charles Lee Lewes | 1,128 | | |
| Independent | William James Wetenhall | 1,087 | | |
| Moderate | John William Dixon | 1,051 | | |
| Independent | John Leighton | 614 | | |
| Progressive win (new seat) | | | | |
| Progressive win (new seat) | | | | |

1892 London County Council election: St Pancras East
| Party | Candidate | Votes | % | ±% |
|---|---|---|---|---|
| Progressive | Howell Idris | 2,010 | | |
| Moderate | William James Wetenhall | 1,811 | | |
| Independent | John Leighton | 1,040 | | |
| Ind. Labour Party | C. Foster Davis | 457 | | |
| Progressive hold | | Swing | | |
| Moderate gain from Progressive | | Swing | | |

1895 London County Council election: St Pancras East
| Party | Candidate | Votes | % | ±% |
|---|---|---|---|---|
| Progressive | Howell Idris | 1,838 | | |
| Moderate | William James Wetenhall | 1,707 | | |
| Moderate | John Leighton | 695 | | |
| Independent | F. Courtney | 657 | | |
| Social Democratic Federation | C. Foster Davis | 187 | | |
| Progressive hold | | Swing | | |
| Moderate hold | | Swing | | |

1898 London County Council election: St Pancras North
| Party | Candidate | Votes | % | ±% |
|---|---|---|---|---|
| Progressive | Howell Idris | 2,334 | | |
| Progressive | David Waterlow | 2,112 | | |
| Moderate | William James Wetenhall | 2,001 | | |
| Moderate | Robert James Willis | 1,607 | | |
| Independent | John Leighton | 144 | | |
| Independent | A. E. Lucas | 65 | | |
| Progressive gain from Moderate | | Swing | | |
| Progressive hold | | Swing | | |

1901 London County Council election: St Pancras North
| Party | Candidate | Votes | % | ±% |
|---|---|---|---|---|
| Progressive | David Waterlow | 2,791 | 29.7 | +3.9 |
| Progressive | Herbert Wilberforce | 2,605 | 27.8 | −0.7 |
| Conservative | William James Wetenhall | 2,051 | 21.9 | −2.5 |
| Conservative | Robert James Willis | 1,855 | 19.8 | −0.2 |
| Independent | John Leighton | 80 | 0.8 | −1.0 |
| Progressive hold | | Swing | | |
| Progressive hold | | Swing | +2.1 | |

1904 London County Council election: St Pancras North
| Party | Candidate | Votes | % | ±% |
|---|---|---|---|---|
| Progressive | Robert Milne Beaton | 3,045 | | |
| Progressive | David Waterlow | 3,023 | | |
| Conservative | W. Low | 1,737 | | |
| Conservative | H. B. Betterton | 1,695 | | |
| Majority | | | | |
| Progressive hold | | Swing | | |

1907 London County Council election: St Pancras North
| Party | Candidate | Votes | % | ±% |
|---|---|---|---|---|
| Progressive | David Waterlow | 3,847 | | |
| Progressive | Robert Milne Beaton | 3,824 | | |
| Municipal Reform | E. J. King | 3,526 | | |
| Municipal Reform | Hercules Pakenham | 3,501 | | |
| Majority | | | | |
| Progressive hold | | Swing | | |

1910 London County Council election: St Pancras North
| Party | Candidate | Votes | % | ±% |
|---|---|---|---|---|
| Progressive | Thomas Frederick Hobson | 3,552 | | |
| Progressive | Arthur Lewis Leon | 3,507 | | |
| Municipal Reform | T. H. Russell | 3,097 | | |
| Municipal Reform | Wyndham Clarke | 3,022 | | |
| Majority | | | | |
| Progressive hold | | Swing | | |

1913 London County Council election: St Pancras North
| Party | Candidate | Votes | % | ±% |
|---|---|---|---|---|
| Progressive | Thomas Frederick Hobson | 2,901 | | |
| Progressive | Arthur Lewis Leon | 2,887 | | |
| Municipal Reform | Conrad Hugh Dinwiddy | 2,654 | | |
| Municipal Reform | Edward Gunter Jones | 2,646 | | |
| British Socialist Party | A. C. Edwards | 514 | | |
| British Socialist Party | W. G. Woodley | 501 | | |
| Majority | | | | |
| Progressive hold | | Swing | | |
| Progressive hold | | Swing | | |

1919 London County Council election: St Pancras North
| Party | Candidate | Votes | % | ±% |
|---|---|---|---|---|
| Progressive | William Lloyd-Taylor | Unopposed | | |
| Progressive | John Hunter Harley | Unopposed | | |
| Majority | | | | |
| Progressive hold | | Swing | | |
| Progressive hold | | Swing | | |

1922 London County Council election: St Pancras North
| Party | Candidate | Votes | % | ±% |
|---|---|---|---|---|
| Municipal Reform | Ian Fraser | 6,982 | 24.6 | |
| Municipal Reform | Alice Elliot | 6,751 | 23.8 | |
| Labour | H. J. Brown | 4,912 | 17.3 | |
| Labour | Frank Lawrence Combes | 4,798 | 16.9 | |
| Progressive | William Lloyd Taylor | 2,513 | 8.9 | |
| Progressive | John Hunter Harley | 2,407 | 8.5 | |
| Majority | | 1,839 | 6.5 | |
| Municipal Reform gain from Progressive | | Swing | | |
| Municipal Reform gain from Progressive | | Swing | | |

1925 London County Council election: St Pancras North
| Party | Candidate | Votes | % | ±% |
|---|---|---|---|---|
| Municipal Reform | Alexander Muir Shand | 6,251 | | |
| Municipal Reform | Alice Elliot | 6,184 | | |
| Labour | T. W. McCormack | 5,757 | | |
| Labour | Florence Harrison Bell | 5,578 | | |
| Progressive | W. H. Shepherd | 948 | | |
| Progressive | A. Baker | 916 | | |
| Majority | | | | |
| Municipal Reform hold | | Swing | | |
| Municipal Reform hold | | Swing | | |

1928 London County Council election: St Pancras North
| Party | Candidate | Votes | % | ±% |
|---|---|---|---|---|
| Municipal Reform | Alexander Muir Shand | 6,270 | | |
| Municipal Reform | Alice Elliot | 6,235 | | |
| Labour | William Carter | 6,006 | | |
| Labour | Florence Harrison Bell | 5,899 | | |
| Liberal | H. J. Brown | 2,086 | | |
| Liberal | C. G. Cash | 2,083 | | |
| Majority | | | | |
| Municipal Reform hold | | Swing | | |
| Municipal Reform hold | | Swing | | |

1931 London County Council election: St Pancras North
| Party | Candidate | Votes | % | ±% |
|---|---|---|---|---|
| Municipal Reform | Alfred Davies | 7,565 | | |
| Municipal Reform | Lilian Cadman | 7,531 | | |
| Labour | Henry Montague Tibbles | 5,159 | | |
| Labour | Florence Harrison Bell | 5,157 | | |
| Communist | W. G. Shepherd | 213 | | |
| Communist | P. Zinkin | 183 | | |
| Majority | | | | |
| Municipal Reform hold | | Swing | | |
| Municipal Reform hold | | Swing | | |

1934 London County Council election: St Pancras North
| Party | Candidate | Votes | % | ±% |
|---|---|---|---|---|
| Municipal Reform | Alfred Davies | 7,503 | | |
| Municipal Reform | Sidney Bolsom | 7,392 | | |
| Labour | Henry Charleton | 7,235 | | |
| Labour | Fred Powe | 7,097 | | |
| Communist | W. G. Shepherd | 352 | | |
| Communist | J. L. Dooley | 340 | | |
| Majority | | | | |
| Municipal Reform hold | | Swing | | |
| Municipal Reform hold | | Swing | | |

1937 London County Council election: St Pancras North
| Party | Candidate | Votes | % | ±% |
|---|---|---|---|---|
| Labour | George House | 8,960 | | |
| Labour | Harry Smith | 8,877 | | |
| Municipal Reform | E. Davies | 8,030 | | |
| Municipal Reform | Sidney Bolsom | 7,980 | | |
| Majority | | | | |
| Labour gain from Municipal Reform | | Swing | | |
| Labour gain from Municipal Reform | | Swing | | |

1946 London County Council election: St Pancras North
| Party | Candidate | Votes | % | ±% |
|---|---|---|---|---|
| Labour | George House | 7,984 | | |
| Labour | Harry Smith | 7,636 | | |
| Conservative | C. Farrell | 4,915 | | |
| Conservative | Ian Orr-Ewing | 4,880 | | |
| Majority | | | | |
| Labour hold | | Swing | | |
| Labour hold | | Swing | | |

1949 London County Council election: St Pancras North
| Party | Candidate | Votes | % | ±% |
|---|---|---|---|---|
| Labour | Shaikh Ghisaud Dean | 12,859 | | |
| Labour | Evelyn Denington | 12,643 | | |
| Labour | Iris Bonham | 12,636 | | |
| Conservative | J. H. Robertson | 11,620 | | |
| Conservative | G. Morgan-Harris | 11,483 | | |
| Conservative | Attracta Rewcastle | 11,445 | | |
| Labour win (new seat) | | | | |
| Labour hold | | Swing | | |
| Labour hold | | Swing | | |

1952 London County Council election: St Pancras North
| Party | Candidate | Votes | % | ±% |
|---|---|---|---|---|
| Labour | Shaikh Ghisaud Dean | 16,839 | | |
| Labour | Iris Bonham | 16,512 | | |
| Labour | Evelyn Denington | 16,451 | | |
| Conservative | R. J. Howell | 9,768 | | |
| Conservative | K. G. B. Morrison | 9,679 | | |
| Conservative | L. Wostenholme | 9,447 | | |
| Labour hold | | Swing | | |
| Labour hold | | Swing | | |
| Labour hold | | Swing | | |

1955 London County Council election: St Pancras North
| Party | Candidate | Votes | % | ±% |
|---|---|---|---|---|
| Labour | Shaikh Ghisaud Dean | 10,752 | | |
| Labour | Iris Bonham | 10,478 | | |
| Labour | Evelyn Denington | 10,381 | | |
| Conservative | M. Carruthers | 7,318 | | |
| Conservative | G. I. Harley | 7,143 | | |
| Conservative | R. J. Howell | 7,084 | | |
| Labour hold | | Swing | | |
| Labour hold | | Swing | | |
| Labour hold | | Swing | | |

1958 London County Council election: St Pancras North
| Party | Candidate | Votes | % | ±% |
|---|---|---|---|---|
| Labour | Evelyn Denington | 12,154 | | |
| Labour | Frederick Lionel Tonge | 11,642 | | |
| Labour | Grace Lee | 11,620 | | |
| Conservative | M. Carruthers | 5,903 | | |
| Conservative | A. P. Thomas | 5,674 | | |
| Conservative | Bernard Brook-Partridge | 5,455 | | |
| Communist | Jock Nicholson | 1,631 | | |
| Labour hold | | Swing | | |
| Labour hold | | Swing | | |
| Labour hold | | Swing | | |

1961 London County Council election: St Pancras North
| Party | Candidate | Votes | % | ±% |
|---|---|---|---|---|
| Labour | Evelyn Denington | 12,943 | | |
| Labour | Grace Lee | 12,408 | | |
| Labour | Frederick Lionel Tonge | 12,231 | | |
| Conservative | D. Mitchell | 8,144 | | |
| Conservative | G. Tucker | 7,741 | | |
| Conservative | G. Dare | 7,705 | | |
| Communist | Jock Nicholson | 2,116 | | |
| Labour hold | | Swing | | |
| Labour hold | | Swing | | |
| Labour hold | | Swing | | |
