= Ken Gatward =

Royal Air Force pilot

Alfred Kitchener Gatward DSO DFC* AE
- Alfred Kitchener Gatward
- Born: Alfred Kitchener Gatward; 28 August 1914; Edmonton, London, England
- Died: 19 November 1998 (aged 84); Colchester, Essex
- Military career
- Allegiance: United Kingdom
- Branch: Royal Air Force
- Service years: 1939–1964
- Rank: Group Captain
- Nickname: Ken
- Service number: 83251
- Conflicts: World War II: Battle of France; Battle of Dunkirk
- Awards: Distinguished Service Order Distinguished Flying Cross & Bar Mentioned in Dispatches

Group Captain Alfred Kitchener Gatward, DSO, DFC*, AE (28 August 1914 – 19 November 1998), known as Ken Gatward, was a British Royal Air Force (RAF) pilot of the Second World War.

== Early life ==
Gatward was born in 1914 above Hornsey police station, where his father was Chief Inspector of police. He attended St George's College in Palmers Green, and later became a journalist before joining the wallpaper manufacturers Coloroll. He joined the RAF Volunteer Reserve in 1937.

== RAF career ==
At the outbreak of war in 1939 Gatward was a sergeant pilot and was commissioned on 27 July 1940 and flew Bristol Blenheims with No 53 Squadron on low level raids. Converting to Bristol Beaufighters in 1941 he flew with No 236 Squadron.

== Operation Squabble ==
Intelligence gathered by Major Ben Cowburn of the Special Operations Executive (SOE) in the early spring of 1942 showed that the Germans paraded down the Champs-Élysées in Paris every day between 12:15 and 12:45. Air Chief Marshal Sir Philip Joubert de la Ferté, the Commander-in-Chief of Coastal Command, devised a propaganda idea to boost the morale of the French by draping the Arc de Triomphe with the French tricolour. He called on Flt Lt Gatward to see if he would volunteer for the "unsafe" mission. Gatward had already undertaken numerous low-level daylight attacks and he and the navigator, Sgt Gilbert 'George' Fern, agreed. The plan was to fly at low level down the Champs-Élysées, strafe the German soldiers on parade and as a backup target, attack the Kriegsmarine headquarters in the Ministère de la Marine (the former home of the French Naval Ministry).

On 5 May 1942 Gatward and Fern began to practice for the raid by attacking a shipwreck in the English Channel. They also pored over maps of Paris and the best routes in and out of the city. Gatward and Fern obtained a Tricolour from Portsmouth Harbour and had it cut into two. Each section was weighted with iron and they tested dropping them from a hangar roof to see how they unfurled. The flags were then installed on their Beaufighter Mk Ic (code ND-C, serial T4800). One section was to be draped over the Arc de Triomphe, the other over the ministry.

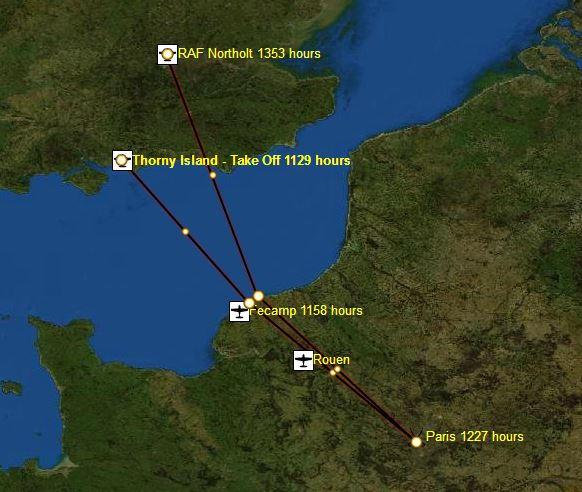
Gatward's flight path to and from Paris

They first attempted the raid on 13 May, but encountered poor weather after crossing the French coast. They were under orders to return if this happened. On 12 June 1942, Gatward and Fern took off again at 11:29 hours from RAF Thorney Island in heavy rain. Initial weather conditions of ten tenths cloud at 2,000 feet with heavy precipitation were encountered and the aircraft set course for the target at 11:31 hours. Crossing the French coast a few miles eastward of Fécamp at 11:58 hours, the cloud cover thinned and by the time they reached Rouen there was bright sunshine. With excellent visibility the aircraft passed over the suburbs of Paris at a very low altitude and some light flak was encountered. He circled the Eiffel Tower at 12:27 hours. During this low-level flying he suffered a bird strike in his starboard engine radiator, but managed to fly on. At approximately 12:28 hours he banked to port and headed towards the Champs-Élysées.

The intelligence information about the time of the parade was incorrect so there were no German soldiers to strafe, but Fern released the first Tricolour down the flare chute over the Arc de Triomphe. Gatward then attacked the Ministre de la Marine in the Place de la Concorde, and strafed the building with 20 mm cannon shells, scattering German sentries. Fern then dropped the second Tricolour.

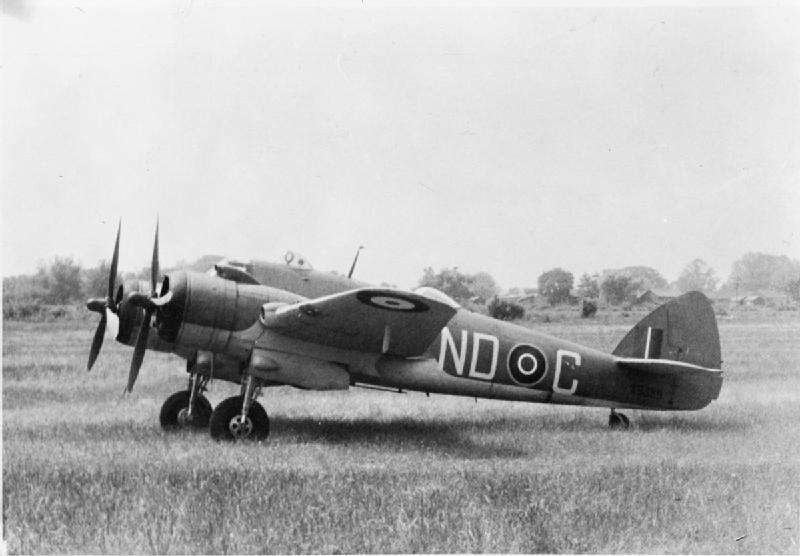
Bristol Beaufighter Mk Ic, T4800 'ND-C', of No. 236 Squadron RAF

Gatward then turned for home at 12:30 hours and landed at RAF Northolt at 13:53 hours. Upon returning to Northolt, the dead bird, which was found to be a French crow, was removed from the starboard radiator and laid to rest at the airfield. Later intelligence confirmed that the parade had been assembling at the time of the attack, but had to be abandoned due to the confusion following Gatward's raid. Gatward was awarded an immediate Distinguished Flying Cross (DFC) for his actions that day and Fern received the Distinguished Flying Medal (DFM).

Gatward recorded the raid in his log book,

Paris – No cover – 0 ft (feet). Drop Tricolours on Arc Triomphe [sic] & Ministry Marine [sic]. Shoot up German HQ. Little flak, no E.A. [enemy aircraft] Bird in STBD [starboard] oil radiator. Returned Northolt and on to Command 61 photos. Heavy rain over England. France fair to light. Northolt to Thorney, Thorney return base. Air Test

Following the Paris raid he was appointed the personal assistant to Lt Gen Noel Mason-MacFarlane, the Governor of Gibraltar.

== Later RAF career ==
Returning to operations in June 1943, Gatward became a Flight Commander with 404 Squadron Royal Canadian Air Force, operating from RAF Wick. Following the loss of their commanding officer in March 1944, Gatward took over command and received his DSO in June 1944. In August his raid with 24 Beaufighters against enemy shipping in Norwegian waters sank four minesweepers and put a destroyer out of action but the squadron suffered many losses. Gatward ended the war in command of No. 157 Wing RAF.

== Postwar career ==
Gatward became the RAF liaison officer with the USAF in Germany in 1946. In 1955 he took command of RAF Odiham and later served with Supreme Headquarters Allied Powers Europe. After serving 30 years in the RAF he retired on 3 September 1964 with the rank of group captain at the Air Cadet Headquarters at White Waltham. He married Pamela Yeomans and retired to Frinton-on-Sea, in Essex. Gatward had one daughter, a love child (Janice [Jan] born in London in 1949, who lives in Australia), with Theressa (Tess) Warren (1918–2019). Father and daughter were reunited for the first time 21 years later.

== Honours and awards ==
- Distinguished Flying Cross 12 June 1942
- Mentioned in Dispatches, February 1944.
- Companion of the Distinguished Service Order, 2 June 1944 – "Acting Wing Commander Alfred Kitchener Gatward DFC (83251)" RAFVR, No. 404 (RCAF) Squadron:

Wing Commander Gatward has taken part in a large number of operational sorties. Recently he has been engaged on anti-shipping operations off the Norwegian coast. His brilliant leadership has inspired confidence in his crew and materially contributed to the successful conclusion of many engagements resulting in serious losses to the enemy. Both in the air and on the ground, this officer has set a magnificent example.

- Bar to Distinguished Flying Cross 2 October 1944 – Acting Wing Commander Alfred Kitchener Gatward, DSO DFC (83251), o. 404 Squadron is awarded:

This officer has led the squadron with great skill and gallantry in many sorties. In July 1944, he participated in an operation which resulted in the destruction of an enemy convoy, comprising three medium sized merchant vessels and six escorting ships. In August 1944, Wing Commander Gatward led his squadron in an attack on a target in the Gironde area. During the operation his aircraft was repeatedly hit by anti-aircraft fire and sustained serious damage. Nevertheless he flew safely to base in the face of great difficulty. This officer has displayed leadership of the highest order.

Distinguished Service Order (DSO)	1944
Distinguished Flying Cross (DFC) 1942	with Bar 1944
War Medal 1939–1945 with Palm for Mentioned in Dispatches	February 1944
Atlantic Star	with France & Germany clasp
Africa Star	
Defence Medal	
Air Efficiency Award	

== Sale of medals ==
Following the death of his wife in 2012, Gatward's medals were put up for sale on 30 November 2012 at Colchester auctioneers Reeman Dansie with an estimate of £8,000. The medals, along with cartoons of the Paris attack, original photographs and congratulatory telegrams sold for £41,000.
