= Frederick Hastings =

Frederick Hastings (21 July 1838 – 15 January 1937), was an English Congregational minister and writer.

Hastings was born on 21 July 1838, the son of George and Sarah Hastings. His father was a merchant and shipowner in London, and the son began his active life in his father's office. Later, he joined a Greek New Testament class started by the pastor of the church he attended, and after a sermon by Charles Spurgeon at the Surrey Music Hall he decided to become a minister and entered Hackney College.

In 1862 he became pastor of the historic Quay Meeting of the Congregational Church at Woodbridge, Suffolk. After four years there he went out to New Brunswick as a minister at Saint John. In 1870 he returned to England to a charge at Wanstead, where he remained for two years. His next appointment was at Weston-super-Mare from 1872 to 1881. Then he had seven years at the Institutional Church at Tolmers Square. At the request of Dr. R. W. Dale he went to Australia in 1889 as minister of a church in North Adelaide and remained there five years. He came back to London in 1894 to Markham Square, Chelsea, and preached there till 1903, when he went back to Tolmers Square for 10 years. In 1912 he was appointed to Clifton Church, Peckham, where he remained for six years, going to Eastbourne in 1920. In 1932, at the age of 94, he celebrated the 70th anniversary of his induction to the pastorate by preaching in his church.

Mr. Hastings was a traveller in many lands. He returned from Australia via Paraguay and wrote letters which helped to prevent the exodus of shearers and other labourers from Australia. He visited so many countries on his bicycle that he received the sobriquet of "the cycling parson", a name he employed in one of his many books. He claimed to have ridden some 30,000 miles, visiting France, Saxony, the coat of Italy to Rome, and many parts of the Mediterranean coast. After the War he cycled to Ypres.

Hastings was a chairman of the London Congregational Union, and for some years served on the London County Council. He was a delegate representing the Free Churches at the tercentenary of the signing of the Edict of Nantes. For eight years he was editor of the Homilectic Magazine and of Nisbet & Co's Theological Library. Sketching, boating, cycling and chess, as well as travel, were the recreations of a long and useful career. His union with his first wife, Emily Brightman, who died in 1925, lasted for 63 years. At the age of 88 he married the widow of Mr W. Wallace Copland, of Gibraltar. He had three sons and two daughters.

== Selected works ==
- Sundays Spent About the World, Bristol (1875)
- Don't Worry! etc. (Peeps of the worries in varied phases of life.), Jarrold & Sons (1896)
- The Spins of a Cycling Parson, Walter Scott Publishing (1903)
- Memories of a Million Miles, National Council of Evangelical Free Churches (1911)
- Pages from a Joyous Life, J. Clarke & Co. (1923)
