= Edward Thomas Heron =

Writer and publisher

- Born: 1867; Paddington, London, England, UK
- Died: 1949 (aged 81–82)
- Occupations: Printer, Publisher
- Spouse: Eliza May Margaret Baldrey
- Relatives: Dominic Cooper (great-grandson)

Edward Thomas "E.T." Heron (18 April 1867 – 1949) was a pioneering English film enthusiast who published The Kinematograph Weekly. An industrialist and printing entrepreneur, he established a number of technical and trade journals. A freemason, he was mayor of St Pancras in 1908, and founded the printing and publishing company E. T. Heron and Co Ltd, at Tottenham Court Road, London and at Silver End, Essex.

== Life and career ==
Heron was born at 13 Chichester Street, Paddington, the eldest son of Thomas Heron and his wife, Jane Eliza Ann (née Greene), who had three businesses in the district, selling poultry, game, cheese, and butter. Both parents died in 1879 and, in the care of three strict Baptist maiden aunts, he had a brief education at Dr Moore's Prep School, Marylebone Road, and Haberdashers' Aske's in Hoxton.

The following year, he left school at age 14 and was apprenticed to Faulding & Truslove Printers in Fulham. In 1888, he started his own imprint at Westminster Press, 333 Harrow Road, publishing The Advertiser, which circulated in Paddington and Queen's Park. After further expanding his business operations, in 1897, he married Eliza May Margaret (née Baldrey). The actor Dominic Cooper is their great-grandson.

He commenced publishing The Optical Magic Lantern and Photographic Enlarger (c. 1890), Scott's Machinery Index (1902), The Talking Machine News (1903), The Music Dealer (1906), the Millinery Trade Journal (1906), the Violin Student (1906), The Kinematograph and Lantern Weekly (renamed in 1907), and Bowling and Curling (1908).
