= List of members of London County Council 1889–1919 =

Representation by divisions following the inaugural 1889 election.

This is a list of councillors and aldermen elected or co-opted to the London County Council from its creation under the Local Government Act 1888 until 1919. There were nine triennial elections of the whole council during this period. Elections were postponed for the duration of the First World War. Elections resumed in 1919 under new electoral boundaries and are detailed in List of members of London County Council 1919–37.

== Councillors 1889–1898 ==
Elections of councillors were held every three years. There were 118 councillors, with four elected to represent the City of London and two each for 57 electoral divisions. The divisions were identical to the constituencies for elections to the United Kingdom House of Commons that had been created by the Redistribution of Seats Act 1885. The Progressive Party won a majority of seats in the 1889 elections, and retained it until 1907.

Electoral division	Elected 17 January 1889 * Members of the outgoing Metropolitan Board of Works	Party	Elected 6 March 1892	Party	Elected 2 March 1895	Party
City of London	Sir John Lubbock MP	Progressive	Alfred Fowell Buxton	Moderate	Sir Joseph Dimsdale	Moderate
City of London	The Earl of Rosebery	Progressive	The Duke of Norfolk	Moderate	The Duke of Norfolk (resigned 20 January 1896) The Earl of Denbigh and Desmond (elected 1 February 1896)	Moderate
City of London	Benjamin Cohen	Moderate	Benjamin Cohen	Moderate	Benjamin Cohen MP	Moderate
City of London	Henry Clarke	Moderate	Henry Clarke	Moderate	Henry Clarke	Moderate
Battersea and Clapham (Battersea)	John Burns	Progressive	John Burns	Progressive	John Burns MP	Progressive
Battersea and Clapham (Battersea)	James Tims	Progressive	James Tims (resigned 10 July 1893 following conviction for fraud) William Willis (elected 22 July 1893)	Progressive	William J Davies	Progressive
Battersea and Clapham (Clapham)	Lieutenant-Colonel Arthur Rotton	Moderate	Fred Henderson (resigned 27 March 1893 following his imprisonment)	Labour Progressive	Colonel Arthur Rotton	Moderate
Battersea and Clapham (Clapham)	Lieutenant-Colonel Arthur Rotton	Moderate	Colonel Arthur Rotton (by-election, 11 April 1893)	Moderate	Colonel Arthur Rotton	Moderate
Battersea and Clapham (Clapham)	Thomas Lorimer Corbett	Moderate	Henry Hollier Hood Barrs	Progressive	Thomas Lorimer Corbett	Moderate
Bethnal Green; North East	James Fenning Torr	Progressive	James Fenning Torr	Progressive	James Fenning Torr (resigned 18 June 1895 on appointment as Recorder of Deal)	Progressive
Bethnal Green; North East	James Fenning Torr	Progressive	James Fenning Torr	Progressive	Cosmo Rose-Innes (elected 29 June 1895)	Moderate
Bethnal Green; North East	Walter Wren	Progressive	Charles Freak	Labour Progressive	Charles Freak	Labour Progressive
Bethnal Green; South West	James Branch	Progressive	James Branch	Progressive	James Branch	Progressive
Bethnal Green; South West	Charles Harrison	Progressive	Charles Harrison	Progressive	Charles Harrison MP (died December 1897: seat remained vacant until 1898 election)	Progressive
Camberwell (Dulwich)	William Mitchell Acworth	Moderate	William Matthews	Moderate	William Matthews	Moderate
Camberwell (Dulwich)	Harry James Powell	Moderate	Harry James Powell	Moderate	Captain Richard William Evelyn Middleton	Moderate
Camberwell (North)	Richard Strong	Progressive	Richard Strong	Progressive	Richard Strong	Progressive
Camberwell (North)	The Rev Hugh Boswell Chapman	Progressive	James Sears	Progressive	James Sears	Progressive
Camberwell (Peckham)	Edwin Jones	Progressive	Edwin Jones	Progressive	Edwin Jones	Progressive
Camberwell (Peckham)	Robert Lyon	Progressive	Robert Lyon	Progressive	Robert Lyon	Progressive
Chelsea	William Æneas Smith	Progressive	William Æneas Smith (resigned 31 January 1893) Edmund Turton (elected unopposed 8 February 1893)	Progressive	The Earl Cadogan (resigned 2 November 1895) Cecil Maurice Chapman (elected 19 November 1895)	Moderate
Chelsea	George William Osborn	Progressive	Benjamin Francis Conn Costelloe	Progressive	Benjamin Francis Conn Costelloe	Progressive
Deptford	Ernest Collard	Moderate	Sidney Webb	Progressive	Sidney Webb	Progressive
Deptford	William Hazlewood Phillips	Progressive	Henry Keylock	Labour Progressive	John Dumphreys	Moderate
Finsbury (Central)	Earl Compton	Progressive	Hon. Ashley Ponsonby	Progressive	Hon. Ashley Ponsonby	Progressive
Finsbury (Central)	Frederick Alfred Ford	Progressive	Ernest Bowen Rowlands (declared bankrupt 10 June 1892) Dr William Farewell Blake (elected at by-election 2 July 1892)	Progressive	Dr William Farewell Blake	Progressive
Finsbury (East)	John Benn	Progressive	John Benn	Progressive	John Benn	Progressive
Finsbury (East)	Captain John Sinclair	Progressive	The Earl of Rosebery	Progressive	Joseph Allen Baker	Progressive
Finsbury (Holborn)	Alfred Hoare	Moderate	James Remnant	Moderate	James Remnant	Moderate
Finsbury (Holborn)	Thomas William Maule	Progressive	Arthur Cowper Ranyard	Moderate	The Earl of Dudley	Moderate
Fulham	James Beal	Progressive	Edwin Cornwall	Progressive	Edwin Cornwall	Progressive
Fulham	Robert Arthur Germaine	Moderate	Commissary General Arthur Downes	Progressive	Sir William Lawrence Young	Progressive
Greenwich	George Lidgett	Progressive	George Lidgett	Progressive	Henry Thomas Banning	Moderate
Greenwich	Richard Stephens Jackson	Progressive	Richard Jackson	Progressive	Dr Ralph Gooding	Moderate
Hackney (Central)	John Lowles	Moderate	Edward Pickersgill	Progressive	Frederick William Maude	Progressive
Hackney (Central)	Walter Johnston	Moderate	Thomas McKinnon Wood	Progressive	Thomas McKinnon Wood	Progressive
Hackney (North)	Joseph Beck (died 18 April 1891) Dr. Elijah Baxter Forman elected at by-election 11 May 1891	Moderate	Dr. Elijah Baxter Forman	Moderate	Dr. Elijah Baxter Forman	Moderate
Hackney (North)	Alfred Davies	Progressive	John McCall	Progressive	Edward Baudouin Ellice-Clark	Moderate
Hackney (South)	John Jones	Progressive	Captain James Bannerman	Progressive	Alfred Smith	Progressive
Hackney (South)	George Bethell Holmes	Progressive	George Bethell Holmes	Progressive	Arthur Humphrey	Labour Progressive
Hammersmith	Charles Courtenay Cramp	Moderate	William Bull	Moderate	William Bull	Moderate
Hammersmith	Andrew Arter	Moderate	Andrew Arter	Moderate	Edward Goulding	Moderate
Hampstead	John Fletcher	Moderate	John Fletcher	Moderate	John Fletcher	Moderate
Hampstead	Henry Harben*	Moderate	Henry Harben	Moderate	Edward Bond	Moderate
Islington East	Andrew Mitchell Torrance	Progressive	Andrew Mitchell Torrance	Progressive	Andrew Mitchell Torrance	Progressive
Islington East	Charles Horsley	Moderate	James Galloway Weir	Progressive	James Laughland	Progressive
Islington North	Dr William Ebenezer Grigsby	Progressive	Dr William Ebenezer Grigsby (resigned 8 November 1893 following appointment as a district judge in Cyprus.) Dr Thomas Bateman Napier (elected 25 November 1893)	Progressive	Dr Thomas Bateman Napier	Progressive
Islington North	William Coulson Parkinson	Progressive	William Coulson Parkinson	Progressive	William Coulson Parkinson	Progressive
Islington South	George Samuel Elliott	Progressive	George Samuel Elliott	Progressive	George Samuel Elliott	Progressive
Islington South	Richard Roberts	Progressive	Richard Roberts	Progressive	Richard Roberts	Progressive
Islington West	Donald Horne Macfarlane	Progressive	George Joseph Chatterton	Moderate	George Heynes Radford	Progressive
Islington West	Robert Brudenell Carter	Moderate	William Goodman	Progressive	William Goodman	Progressive
Kensington North	Frederick Charlwood Frye*	Progressive	Frederick Charles Baum (resigned 11 October 1892) Richard Baxter Doake (elected at by-election 29 October 1892)	Progressive	William Henry Fox	Moderate
Kensington North	John Lloyd	Progressive	John Lloyd	Progressive	James Biggs Porter	Moderate
Kensington South	Charles Hallyburton Campbell	Moderate	Charles Hallyburton Campbell	Moderate	Charles Hallyburton Campbell	Moderate
Kensington South	Captain Walter Haweis James	Moderate	Captain Walter Haweis James (resigned 31 January 1893) Charles Thompson Beresford-Hope (elected at by-election 15 February 1893)	Moderate	Charles Thompson Beresford-Hope (resigned 3 November 1896) Richard Robinson (elected unopposed 14 November 1896)	Moderate
Lambeth (Brixton)	Captain Edmund Verney	Progressive	Dr Henry Harris	Progressive	William Haydon	Moderate
Lambeth (Brixton)	Charles Thompson Beresford-Hope (on petition)‡	Moderate	Stephen Seaward Tayler	Progressive	Charles Jerome	Moderate
Lambeth (Kennington)	Horatio Myer	Progressive	William Stockbridge	Progressive	Joseph Dixon	Moderate
Lambeth (Kennington)	Harry Seymour Foster	Moderate	Hon Richard Cecil Grosvenor	Progressive	Thomas Arthur Organ	Progressive
Lambeth (North)	James Rolls Hoare	Moderate	Frank Smith	Progressive	Spencer Barclay Heward	Progressive
Lambeth (North)	Henry Bell	Moderate	Lieutenant-Colonel Charles Ford	Progressive	Lieutenant-Colonel Charles Ford	Progressive
Lambeth (Norwood)	William Bennett Doubleday	Progressive	William Bennett Doubleday	Progressive	Col Frederick Campbell	Moderate
Lambeth (Norwood)	Nathaniel William Hubbard	Progressive	Nathaniel William Hubbard	Progressive	Dr James White	Moderate
Lewisham	William George Lemon	Progressive	William George Lemon	Progressive	Sir Alexander Wilson	Moderate
Lewisham	Franc Sadleir Brereton	Moderate	George Alfred Harvey	Progressive	Theophilus William Williams	Moderate
Marylebone East	Harry Hananel Marks	Moderate	Edmund Boulnois	Moderate	Edmund Boulnois MP	Moderate
Marylebone East	Horace Farquhar	Moderate	Horace Farquhar	Moderate	Sir Horace Farquhar	Moderate
Marylebone West	Edmund Boulnois	Moderate	Thomas Reed	Moderate	Thomas Reed (died 9 February 1897) Viscount Royston (elected 26 February 1897, succeeded as 6th Earl of Hardwicke 18 May 1897)	Moderate
Marylebone West	Sir Reginald Hanson	Moderate	Thomas Dewar	Moderate	Edward White	Moderate
Newington (Walworth)	John Marsland	Progressive	John Marsland	Progressive	Richard Parker	Progressive
Newington (Walworth)	William Saunders	Progressive	William Saunders	Progressive	Russell Spokes	Progressive
Newington (West)	Dr William Gibson Bott	Progressive	Dr William Gibson Bott	Progressive	William Marcus Thompson	Progressive
Newington (West)	Albert Bassett Hopkins	Progressive	Albert Bassett Hopkins	Progressive	The Earl Russell	Progressive
Paddington (North)	Melvill Beachcroft	Moderate	William Urquhart	Moderate	William Urquhart	Moderate
Paddington (North)	Dr Edward Parker Young	Moderate	Henry Percy Harris	Moderate	Henry Percy Harris	Moderate
Paddington (South)	George Fardell*	Moderate	George Fardell	Moderate	George Fardell	Moderate
Paddington (South)	Sir George David Harris	Moderate	Sir George David Harris	Moderate	Sir George David Harris	Moderate
St George's Hanover Square	Robert Antrobus	Moderate	Robert Antrobus	Moderate	Robert Antrobus	Moderate
St George's Hanover Square	Howard Vincent	Moderate	Howard Vincent	Moderate	Howard Vincent (resigned 18 February 1896) Hon Henry Legge (elected unopposed 29 February 1896)	Moderate
St Pancras (East)	Nathan Robinson	Progressive	Nathan Robinson	Progressive	Nathan Robinson	Progressive
St Pancras (East)	Thomas Bentley Westacott	Moderate	Thomas Bentley Westacott	Moderate	Thomas Bentley Westacott	Moderate
St Pancras (North)	Thomas Howell Williams	Progressive	Thomas Howell Williams	Progressive	Thomas Howell Williams Idris (assumed the additional surname "Idris")	Progressive
St Pancras (North)	Charles Lee Lewes (died 26 February 1891)	Progressive	William James Wetenhall*	Moderate	William James Wetenhall	Moderate
St Pancras (North)	William James Wetenhall (elected at by-election 17 March 1891)	Moderate	William James Wetenhall*	Moderate	William James Wetenhall	Moderate
St Pancras (South)	John Hutton	Progressive	John Hutton	Progressive	Sir John Hutton	Progressive
St Pancras (South)	Colonel Robert William Edis	Moderate	Captain Frank Sheffield	Progressive	Sir John Blundell Maple MP	Moderate
St Pancras (West)	Harry Levy-Lawson MP	Progressive	Lord Carrington	Progressive	Lord Carrington	Progressive
St Pancras (West)	Herbert Raphael	Progressive	Dr William Job Collins	Progressive	Dr William Job Collins	Progressive
Shoreditch (Haggerston)	Joseph Bottomley Firth MP (died 3 September 1889) William James Orsman elected in by-election 14 October 1889	Progressive	William James Orsman	Progressive	Edmund Turton (resigned 21 January 1897) Rt Hon. George Shaw-Lefevre (elected 13 February 1897)	Progressive
Shoreditch (Haggerston)	The Lord Monkswell	Progressive	The Lord Monkswell	Progressive	The Lord Monkswell	Progressive
Shoreditch (Hoxton)	Edward Austin	Progressive	Henry Ward	Progressive	Henry Ward	Progressive
Shoreditch (Hoxton)	Nathan Moss	Progressive	Nathan Moss	Progressive	Nathan Moss	Progressive
Southwark (Bermondsey)	George Cooper	Progressive	George Cooper	Progressive	George Cooper	Progressive
Southwark (Bermondsey)	Joseph Thornton	Progressive	Joseph Thornton	Progressive	Joseph Thornton	Progressive
Southwark (Rotherhithe)	Francis Culling Carr-Gomm	Progressive	Dr James Thomas Macnamara (resigned 15 March 1894); Howell Jones Williams (elected 31 March 1894)	Progressive	Arthur Henry Aylmer Morton	Moderate
Southwark (Rotherhithe)	Lawrence Stevens	Progressive	Lawrence Stevens (died 5 May 1894)	Progressive	William Henry Christopher Payne	Moderate
Southwark (Rotherhithe)	Lawrence Stevens	Progressive	William Henry Christopher Payne (by-election, 9 June 1894)	Moderate	William Henry Christopher Payne	Moderate
Southwark (West)	Alfred Henry Haggis	Progressive	Thomas Hunter	Labour Progressive	Thomas Hunter	Progressive
Southwark (West)	John George Rhodes	Progressive	Edric Bayley	Progressive	Edric Bayley	Progressive
Strand	Sir Augustus Harris	Moderate	Walter Emden	Moderate	Walter Emden	Moderate
Strand	Major Clifford Probyn	Moderate	Major Clifford Probyn	Moderate	Major Clifford Probyn	Moderate
Tower Hamlets (Bow and Bromley)	Walter Hunter JP	Moderate	Ben Cooper	Labour Progressive	Ben Cooper	Labour Progressive
Tower Hamlets (Bow and Bromley)	Jane Cobden §	Progressive	William Wallace Bruce	Labour Progressive	William Wallace Bruce	Labour Progressive
Tower Hamlets (Limehouse)	James Ambrose	Progressive	William Pearce	Progressive	William Pearce	Progressive
Tower Hamlets (Limehouse)	Arthur Lewis Leon	Progressive	Arthur Lewis Leon	Progressive	Arthur Lewis Leon	Progressive
Tower Hamlets (Mile End)	Frederick Nicholas Charrington	Progressive	Frederick Nicholas Charrington	Progressive	The Viscount Mountmorres	Moderate
Tower Hamlets (Mile End)	Alfred Jordan Hollington	Progressive	Alfred Jordan Hollington	Progressive	Gerard Bicker-Caarten	Moderate
Tower Hamlets (Poplar)	William Pelham Bullivant	Moderate	Will Crooks	Labour Progressive	Will Crooks	Labour Progressive
Tower Hamlets (Poplar)	John McDougall	Progressive	John McDougall	Progressive	John McDougall	Progressive
Tower Hamlets (St George's in the East)	Richard Stevens Sly*	Progressive	Andrew Mercer	Labour Progressive	Dalby Williams	Moderate
Tower Hamlets (St George's in the East)	Philip Meadows Martineau	Progressive	Philip Meadows Martineau	Progressive	Harry Marks	Moderate
Tower Hamlets (Stepney)	Captain William Spencer Beaumont	Moderate	W. C. Steadman	Progressive	W. C. Steadman	Progressive
Tower Hamlets (Stepney)	Benjamin Francis Conn Costelloe	Progressive	Walter Baldwyn Yates	Progressive	Walter Baldwyn Yates	Progressive
Tower Hamlets (Whitechapel)	Stuart Samuel	Progressive	Thomas Catmur	Progressive	Thomas Catmur (resigned 24 February 1897) Hon. Harry Levy-Lawson (elected 16 March 1897)	Progressive
Tower Hamlets (Whitechapel)	Charles Tarling	Progressive	Charles Tarling	Progressive	Morris Abrahams	Moderate
Wandsworth	Willoughby Dickinson	Progressive	Willoughby Dickinson	Progressive	The Earl of Dunraven and Mountearl	Moderate
Wandsworth	Dr. George Longstaff	Moderate	Dr. George Longstaff	Moderate	Dr. George Longstaff	Moderate
Westminster	Sir Walter Eugene de Souza	Moderate	Sir Walter Eugene de Souza	Moderate	Sir Walter Eugene de Souza (died 13 April 1897) Louis Henry Hayter (elected 20 May 1897)	Moderate
Westminster	Vernon James Watney	Moderate	The Earl of Ilchester	Moderate	Hon. Lionel Holland	Moderate
Woolwich	Colonel Edwin Hughes MP*	Moderate	Colonel Edwin Hughes MP	Moderate	Colonel Edwin Hughes MP	Moderate
Woolwich	James Alexander Rentoul	Moderate	John Robert Jolly	Independent Progressive	Abel Penfold	Moderate

‡ The Lady Sandhurst (Progressive) received the second highest number of votes. However Beresford-Hope, who came third, petitioned on the grounds that a woman was not eligible to hold a seat on the county council. His petition was allowed and he was deemed elected.
¶ Previously an alderman.
§ Jane Cobden (later Mrs Fisher Unwin), although elected, as a woman was barred from voting, making it effectively vacant from 1889 to 1892.

=== Party strength 1889–1898 ===
The strength of the parties on the council after each election was as follows:

Party	Councillors 1889	Aldermen 1889	Total 1889	Councillors 1892	Aldermen 1892	Total 1892	Councillors 1895	Aldermen 1895	Total 1895
Moderate	46	1	47	35	2	37	59	7	66
Progressive	72	18	90	83	17	100	59	12	71

== Councillors 1898–1907 ==
In 1904 the London School Board was abolished, and its responsibilities were transferred to the county council. At the 1904 election a number of outgoing school board members were elected as councillors.

Electoral division	Elected 3 March 1898	Party	Elected 2 March 1901	Party	Elected 5 March 1904	Party
City of London	Sir Joseph Dimsdale	Moderate	Herbert Stuart Sankey	Moderate	Herbert Stuart Sankey	Moderate
City of London	Duke of Leeds (resigned 13 March 1899) Lord Alexander Thynne (elected unopposed 27 March 1899)	Moderate	Alderman Frederick Prat Alliston	Moderate	Alderman Frederick Prat Alliston	Moderate
City of London	Benjamin Louis Cohen MP	Moderate	Alfred Louis Cohen (died 4 December 1903. Seat remained vacant until March 1904)	Moderate	Sir Thomas Brooke-Hitching	Moderate
City of London	Henry Clarke	Moderate	Henry Clarke	Moderate	Hon Rupert Guinness	Moderate
Battersea and Clapham (Battersea)	John Burns	Progressive	John Burns	Progressive	John Burns MP	Progressive
Battersea and Clapham (Battersea)	William J Davies	Progressive	William J Davies	Progressive	William J Davies	Progressive
Battersea and Clapham (Clapham)	Lieutenant-Colonel Arthur Rotton	Moderate	Lieutenant-Colonel Arthur Rotton	Moderate	Lieutenant-Colonel Arthur Rotton	Moderate
Battersea and Clapham (Clapham)	Thomas Lorimer Corbett	Moderate	Thomas Penn Gaskell	Moderate	Thomas Penn Gaskell	Moderate
Bethnal Green; North East	E A Cornwall	Progressive	E A Cornwall	Progressive	E A Cornwall	Progressive
Bethnal Green; North East	Charles Freak	Labour Progressive	Edward Smith	Progressive	Edward Smith	Progressive
Bethnal Green; South West	James Branch	Progressive	James Branch	Progressive	James Branch	Progressive
Bethnal Green; South West	Benjamin Francis Conn Costelloe (died 22 December 1899) Thomas Wiles (elected unopposed at byelection 3 February 1900)	Progressive	Thomas Wiles	Progressive	Thomas Wiles	Progressive
Camberwell (Dulwich)	William Matthews (died 15 May 1899) Bryce Grant (by-election 29 May 1899)	Moderate	George Alexander Hardy	Progressive	George Alexander Hardy	Progressive
Camberwell (Dulwich)	Captain Richard William Evelyn Middleton (resigned 15 May 1899) John Ratcliffe Cousins (by-election 29 May 1899)	Moderate	John Ratcliffe Cousins	Moderate	Thomas Gautrey (Member of abolished London School Board)	Progressive
Camberwell (North)	Richard Strong	Progressive	Richard Strong	Progressive	Reginald Bray (Member of abolished London School Board)	Progressive
Camberwell (North)	Henry Robert Taylor	Labour Progressive	Henry Robert Taylor	Labour Progressive	Henry Robert Taylor	Labour Progressive
Camberwell (Peckham)	Frederick William Verney	Progressive	Frederick William Verney	Progressive	Frederick William Verney	Progressive
Camberwell (Peckham)	Charles Goddard Clarke	Progressive	Charles Goddard Clarke	Progressive	Charles Goddard Clarke	Progressive
Chelsea	James Jeffery	Progressive	James Jeffery	Progressive	James Jeffery	Progressive
Chelsea	Emslie Horniman	Progressive	Emslie Horniman	Progressive	Emslie Horniman	Progressive
Deptford	Sidney Webb	Progressive	Sidney Webb	Progressive	Sidney Webb	Progressive
Deptford	Robert Charles Phillimore	Progressive	Robert Charles Phillimore	Progressive	Robert Charles Phillimore	Progressive
Finsbury (Central)	Phillip John Rutland	Moderate	Hon. Fitzroy Hemphill	Progressive	Hon. Fitzroy Hemphill	Progressive
Finsbury (Central)	Melvill Beachcroft	Moderate	Frank Smith (resigned 12 November 1901) Ramsay MacDonald (elected unopposed 30 November 1901)	Labour Progressive	Arthur Barnett Russell (Member of abolished London School Board)	Progressive
Finsbury (East)	Joseph Benson	Progressive	Joseph Benson	Progressive	Thomas Edmund Harvey	Progressive
Finsbury (East)	Joseph Allen Baker	Progressive	Joseph Allen Baker	Progressive	Joseph Allen Baker	Progressive
Finsbury (Holborn)	James Remnant	Moderate	Sir H. W. Bliss	Moderate	Sir H. W. Bliss	Moderate
Finsbury (Holborn)	Sir John Dickson-Poynder MP	Moderate	Captain George Swinton	Moderate	Captain George Swinton	Moderate
Fulham	Lord Wolverton	Moderate	Peter Lawson	Progressive	Peter Lawson (resigned 17 October 1905)	Progressive
Fulham	Lord Wolverton	Moderate	Peter Lawson	Progressive	Cyril Stephen Cobb (elected at by-election, 28 October 1905)	Moderate
Fulham	Edward George Easton	Moderate	Timothy Davies	Progressive	Timothy Davies	Progressive
Greenwich	John Peppercorn	Progressive	Frederick William Warmington	Progressive	Frederick William Warmington	Progressive
Greenwich	Richard Stephens Jackson	Progressive	Richard Stephens Jackson	Progressive	Richard Stephens Jackson	Progressive
Hackney (Central)	James Stuart MP	Progressive	Alfred James Shepheard	Progressive	Alfred James Shepheard	Progressive
Hackney (Central)	McKinnon Wood	Progressive	McKinnon Wood	Progressive	McKinnon Wood	Progressive
Hackney (North)	Dr. Elijah Baxter Foreman	Moderate	John Edward Sears	Progressive	John Edward Sears	Progressive
Hackney (North)	George Lampard	Progressive	George Lampard	Progressive	George Lampard	Progressive
Hackney (South)	Alfred Smith	Progressive	Alfred Smith	Progressive	Alfred Smith	Progressive
Hackney (South)	Edmond Browne	Progressive	Edmond Browne	Progressive	Edmond Browne	Progressive
Hammersmith	William James Bull	Moderate	Jocelyn Brandon	Moderate	Jocelyn Brandon	Moderate
Hammersmith	Edward Alfred Goulding MP	Moderate	Edward Collins	Moderate	Edward Collins	Moderate
Hampstead	John Fletcher	Moderate	John Fletcher	Moderate	John Thomas Taylor	Moderate
Hampstead	Edward Bond	Moderate	William Edward Mullins	Progressive	Nicholas Hanhart	Moderate
Islington East	Andrew Mitchell Torrance	Progressive	Andrew Mitchell Torrance	Progressive	Andrew Mitchell Torrance	Progressive
Islington East	James Laughland	Progressive	James Laughland	Progressive	Arthur Augustus Thomas	Progressive
Islington North	Dr Thomas Bateman Napier	Progressive	Dr Thomas Bateman Napier	Progressive	Dr Thomas Bateman Napier	Progressive
Islington North	William Coulson Parkinson	Progressive	William Coulson Parkinson	Progressive	William Coulson Parkinson	Progressive
Islington South	George Samuel Elliott	Independent Progressive	George Samuel Elliott	Moderate	George Dew¶	Progressive
Islington South	Howell Jones Williams	Progressive	Howell Jones Williams	Progressive	Howell Jones Williams	Progressive
Islington West	George Heynes Radford	Progressive	George Heynes Radford	Progressive	George Heynes Radford	Progressive
Islington West	William Goodman	Progressive	William Goodman	Progressive	William Goodman	Progressive
Kensington North	George Edmund Septimus Fryer	Moderate	Walter Pope	Progressive	Walter Pope	Progressive
Kensington North	James Biggs Porter	Moderate	Henry Lorenzo Jephson	Progressive	Henry Lorenzo Jephson	Progressive
Kensington South	Charles Hallyburton Campbell	Moderate	Charles Hallyburton Campbell	Moderate	Hon. F J N Thesiger (succeeded to title "Baron Chelmsford" 9 April 1905, resigned 17 October 1905 on appointment as Governor of Queensland) Charles Frederick Colvile (elected unopposed 28 October 1905)	Moderate
Kensington South	Richard Atkinson Robinson	Moderate	Richard Atkinson Robinson	Moderate	Richard Atkinson Robinson	Moderate
Lambeth (Brixton)	William Haydon	Moderate	Frederick Dolman	Progressive	Frederick Dolman	Progressive
Lambeth (Brixton)	Charles Jerome	Moderate	Lewen Sharp	Progressive	Lewen Sharp	Progressive
Lambeth (Kennington)	John Benn	Progressive	John Benn	Progressive	John Benn	Progressive
Lambeth (Kennington)	Thomas Arthur Organ	Progressive	Stephen Collins	Progressive	Stephen Collins	Progressive
Lambeth (North)	Frank Smith	Progressive	Robert Williams	Progressive	Jabez Williams	Moderate
Lambeth (North)	Lieutenant-Colonel Charles Ford	Progressive	William Wightman	Progressive	William Wightman (died 25 November 1905) Frank Briant (elected at by-election, 16 December 1905)	Progressive
Lambeth (Norwood)	Colonel Frederick Campbell	Moderate	Nathaniel William Hubbard¶	Progressive	Nathaniel William Hubbard	Progressive
Lambeth (Norwood)	Dr James White	Moderate	George Shrubsall	Progressive	George Shrubsall	Progressive
Lewisham	George Edward Dodson	Moderate	George Edward Dodson	Moderate	Hon. Arthur Stanley	Progressive
Lewisham	Theophilus William Williams	Moderate	James William Cleland	Progressive	James William Cleland	Progressive
Marylebone East	Edmund Boulnois	Moderate	Walter Leaf	Independent	Lord Ludlow	Moderate
Marylebone East	Sir Horace Farquhar	Moderate	Dr John Fletcher Little	Independent	W C Bridgeman (Member of abolished London School Board) (resigned 15 November 1904) Earl of Essex (elected 5 December 1904)	Moderate
Marylebone West	Earl of Hardwicke	Moderate	Lord Farquhar (resigned 9 July 1901)	Moderate	John Lewis	Progressive
Marylebone West	Earl of Hardwicke	Moderate	John Lewis (elected 9 July 1901)	Progressive	John Lewis	Progressive
Marylebone West	Edward White	Moderate	Edward White	Moderate	W Bailey	Moderate
Newington (Walworth)	Richard Parker	Progressive	Richard Parker	Progressive	Rev. Arthur William Jephson (Member of abolished London School Board) (resigned 1 May 1906) James Arthur Dawes (elected at by-election, 12 May 1906)	Progressive
Newington (Walworth)	Russell Spokes	Progressive	Russell Spokes	Progressive	Russell Spokes (died 22 April 1906) Charles Jesson (elected at by-election, 12 May 1906)	Progressive
Newington (West)	James Daniel Gilbert	Progressive	James Daniel Gilbert	Progressive	James Daniel Gilbert	Progressive
Newington (West)	John Piggott	Progressive	John Piggott	Progressive	John Piggott	Progressive
Paddington (North)	William Urquhart	Moderate	Melvill Beachcroft¶	Moderate	Melvill Beachcroft	Moderate
Paddington (North)	Henry Percy Harris	Moderate	John Blackwood	Progressive	J Stephens	Moderate
Paddington (South)	Henry Andrade Harben	Moderate	Henry Andrade Harben	Moderate	Henry Andrade Harben	Moderate
Paddington (South)	Sir George David Harris	Moderate	Sir George David Harris (elevated to alderman 12 March 1901) Henry Percy Harris (elected unopposed 23 March 1901)	Moderate	Henry Percy Harris	Moderate
St George's Hanover Square	Robert Antrobus (elected alderman 15 March 1898) William Henry Christopher Payne (elected unopposed 26 March 1898)	Moderate	Hubert John Greenwood	Moderate	Hubert John Greenwood	Moderate
St George's Hanover Square	Colonel the Hon. Henry Charles Legge	Moderate	Sir John Dickson-Poynder MP	Moderate	Hon. Francis Dudley Leigh	Moderate
St Pancras (East)	Nathan Robinson	Progressive	Nathan Robinson (died 9 August 1902) Thomas Howell Williams Idris (elected 30 August 1902)	Progressive	Thomas Howell Williams Idris	Progressive
St Pancras (East)	Frederick Purchese	Progressive	Thomas Arthur Organ	Progressive	Edmund Barnes (Member of abolished London School Board)	Moderate
St Pancras (North)	Thomas Howell Williams	Progressive	Herbert William Wrangham Wilberforce	Progressive	Dr R M Beaton	Progressive
St Pancras (North)	David Sydney Waterlow	Progressive	David Sydney Waterlow	Progressive	David Sydney Waterlow	Progressive
St Pancras (South)	Sir John Hutton	Progressive	Major Frank Sheffield	Progressive	Major Houghton Gastrell	Moderate
St Pancras (South)	Sir John Blundell Maple MP	Moderate	Henry Charles Somers Augustus Somerset	Progressive	Frank Goldsmith	Moderate
St Pancras (West)	Earl Carrington	Progressive	Earl Carrington	Progressive	Earl Carrington	Progressive
St Pancras (West)	Dr William Job Collins	Progressive	Dr William Job Collins	Progressive	Sir William Job Collins	Progressive
Shoreditch (Haggerston)	George Shaw-Lefevre	Progressive	James Stuart	Progressive	James Stuart	Progressive
Shoreditch (Haggerston)	Lord Monkswell	Progressive	Lord Monkswell	Progressive	Lord Monkswell	Progressive
Shoreditch (Hoxton)	Henry Ward	Progressive	Henry Ward	Progressive	Henry Ward	Progressive
Shoreditch (Hoxton)	Henry Taylor Sawell	Progressive	Edward Austin	Progressive	Graham Wallas (Member of abolished London School Board)	Progressive
Southwark (Bermondsey)	Dr George Joseph Cooper	Progressive	Dr George Joseph Cooper	Progressive	Dr George Joseph Cooper (resigned 27 February 1906) Alfred Salter (elected unopposed 10 March 1906)	Progressive
Southwark (Bermondsey)	Joseph Thornton (resigned 1 June 1899) Arthur Acland Allen (elected unopposed 24 June 1899)	Progressive	Arthur Acland Allen	Progressive	Arthur Acland Allen	Progressive
Southwark (Rotherhithe)	Ambrose Pomeroy	Progressive	Ambrose Pomeroy	Progressive	Ambrose Pomeroy	Progressive
Southwark (Rotherhithe)	Harold Glanville	Progressive	Harold Glanville	Progressive	Harold Glanville	Progressive
Southwark (West)	Thomas Hunter	Progressive	Thomas Hunter	Labour Progressive	Thomas Hunter	Progressive
Southwark (West)	Edric Bayley	Progressive	Edric Bayley	Progressive	Edric Bayley	Progressive
Strand	Walter Emden	Moderate	Walter Emden	Moderate	Lord Elcho	Moderate
Strand	Major Clifford Probyn	Moderate	Lieutenant-Colonel Clifford Probyn	Moderate	Lieutenant-Colonel Clifford Probyn	Moderate
Tower Hamlets (Bow and Bromley)	Ben Cooper	Labour Progressive	Ben Cooper	Labour Progressive	Ben Cooper	Labour Progressive
Tower Hamlets (Bow and Bromley)	William Wallace Bruce	Labour Progressive	William Wallace Bruce	Labour Progressive	William Wallace Bruce	Labour Progressive
Tower Hamlets (Limehouse)	William Pearce	Progressive	William Byron Bawn	Progressive	William Byron Bawn	Progressive
Tower Hamlets (Limehouse)	Arthur Lewis Leon	Progressive	Arthur Lewis Leon	Progressive	Arthur Lewis Leon	Progressive
Tower Hamlets (Mile End)	Bertram Stuart Straus	Progressive	Bertram Stuart Straus	Progressive	Bertram Stuart Straus	Progressive
Tower Hamlets (Mile End)	John Renwick Seager	Progressive	John Renwick Seager (resigned 11 March 1902)	Progressive	G J Warren	Progressive
Tower Hamlets (Mile End)	John Renwick Seager	Progressive	Alfred Ordway Goodrich (elected at by-election, 24 March 1902)	Moderate	G J Warren	Progressive
Tower Hamlets (Poplar)	Will Crooks	Labour Progressive	Will Crooks	Labour Progressive	Will Crooks MP	Labour Progressive
Tower Hamlets (Poplar)	John McDougall	Progressive	John McDougall	Progressive	Sir John McDougall	Progressive
Tower Hamlets (St George's in the East)	Charles Barratt	Progressive	John Smith	Progressive	John Smith	Progressive
Tower Hamlets (St George's in the East)	Christopher Balian (resigned following issue of warrant for his arrest 3 April 1900) John Ernest Matthews (elected unopposed 14 April 1900)	Progressive	George Foster	Moderate	Harry Gosling	Labour Progressive
Tower Hamlets (Stepney)	William Charles Steadman	Progressive	William Charles Steadman	Progressive	William Charles Steadman	Progressive
Tower Hamlets (Stepney)	Walter Baldwyn Yates	Progressive	Alfred Thomas Williams	Moderate	Lord Malmesbury (resigned 7 March 1905) Alfred Ordway Goodrich (elected at 18 March 1905 by-election)	Moderate
Tower Hamlets (Whitechapel)	Harry Lawson Webster Levy-Lawson	Progressive	Harry Lawson Webster Levy-Lawson	Progressive	Henry Herman Gordon	Independent
Tower Hamlets (Whitechapel)	William Cowlishaw Johnson	Progressive	William Cowlishaw Johnson	Progressive	William Cowlishaw Johnson	Progressive
Wandsworth	The Earl of Dunraven and Mountearl (resigned 10 November 1899)	Moderate	Mark James Mayhew	Progressive	W Hunt	Moderate
Wandsworth	Mark James Mayhew (elected at 25 November 1899 byelection)	Progressive	Mark James Mayhew	Progressive	W Hunt	Moderate
Wandsworth	Dr. George Blundell Longstaff	Moderate	Dr. George Blundell Longstaff	Moderate	William John Lancaster	Moderate
Westminster	Louis Henry Hayter	Moderate	Louis Henry Hayter	Moderate	Clement Young Sturge	Moderate
Westminster	Reginald White Granville-Smith	Moderate	Reginald White Granville-Smith	Moderate	Reginald White Granville-Smith	Moderate
Woolwich	Colonel Edwin Hughes MP (resigned 6 February 1900) William James Squires (elected at by-election 24 February 1900)	Moderate	William James Squires	Moderate	L Jenkin Jones	Labour Progressive
Woolwich	Abel Penfold (died 5 February 1900) Hon. William Wellesley Peel (elected at by-election 24 February 1900)	Moderate	Hon. William Wellesley Peel MP	Moderate	F Chambers	Progressive

¶ Previously an alderman.

=== Party strength 1898–1907 ===
The strength of the parties on the council after each election was as follows:

Party	Councillors 1898	Aldermen 1898	Total 1898	Councillors 1901	Aldermen 1901	Total 1901	Councillors 1904	Aldermen 1904	Total 1904
Moderate	48	8	56	32	6	38	35	6	41
Progressive	70	10	80	86	12	98	82	13	95
Labour	0	1	1	0	1	1	0	0	0
Independents	0	0	0	0	0	0	1	0	1

== County aldermen 1889–1913 ==
In addition to the 118 councillors the council consisted of 19 county aldermen. Aldermen were elected by the council, and served a six-year term. Half of the aldermanic bench (nine or ten aldermen) were elected every three years following the tri-ennial council election. In the first election of aldermen in February 1889, ten of the nineteen chosen had three-year terms, retiring in 1892.

=== 1889–1892 term ===
Alderman	Party
John Barker	Progressive
Stephen Seaward Tayler	Progressive
Hon. Richard Cecil Grosvenor	Progressive
Samuel Hope Morley (resigned 15 January 1890)	Progressive
Thomas Eccleston Gibb	Progressive
Earl of Meath	Moderate
Evan Spicer	Progressive
Mark Beaufoy (resigned 15 January 1890)	Progressive
Emma Cons	Progressive
Rev Charles Fleming Williams	Progressive
Sir Vincent Kennett-Barrington (elected 4 February 1890)♦	Moderate
Professor James Stuart MP (elected 4 February 1890)♦	Progressive

♦ Election held to fill two vacancies (Beaufoy and Morley)

=== 1889–1895 term ===
Alderman	Party
Lord Lingen (resigned 14 March 1893)	Nominated by both parties
Lord Hobhouse (resigned 8 August 1892)	Nominated by both parties
Quintin Hogg	Progressive
Sir Thomas Farrer, (Lord Farrer from 1893)	Progressive
Frederic Harrison (resigned 18 October 1893)	Progressive
Edmund Routledge	Progressive
Frank Debenham (resigned 25 May 1894)	Progressive
Arthur Arnold	Progressive
George William Erskine Russell	Progressive
Earl Compton† (11 October 1892 in place of Hobhouse)	Progressive
John Fletcher Moulton (11 April 1893 in place of Lingen, declined seat on a technicality 15 April 1893, re-elected 9 May 1893)	Progressive
David Martineau (7 November 1893 in place of Harrison)	Progressive
Lord Welby (12 June 1894 in place of Debenham)	Progressive

=== 1892–1898 term ===
Alderman	Party
Evan Spicer ‡	Progressive
Rev Charles Fleming Williams ‡	Progressive
Professor James Stuart MP ‡	Progressive
Sir John Lubbock †	Progressive
Richard Melvill Beachcroft †	Moderate
Thomas Chambers (died 6 December 1895)	Progressive
Alfred Hoare †	Moderate
John George Rhodes † (died 22 January 1895)	Progressive
Henry Robert Taylor	Progressive
Ben Tillett	Labour Progressive
Lord Tweedmouth (5 February 1895 in place of Rhodes)	Progressive
Sir Robert Arthur Arnold♣ (17 December 1895 in place of Chambers)	Progressive

‡ re-elected alderman
† previously a councillor
♣ previously an alderman (as Arthur Arnold), 1889–1895

=== 1895–1901 term ===
Alderman	Party
Lord Farrer‡ (resigned 15 March 1898)	Progressive
Rt Hon. C T Ritchie (resigned 14 October 1895)	Moderate
Lord Welby‡	Progressive
Hon Evelyn Hubbard (resigned 18 March 1898)	Moderate
Sir Godfrey Lushington (resigned 11 March 1898)	Nominated by both parties
Charles Algernon Whitmore MP	Moderate
Earl of Onslow (resigned 16 October 1899)	Moderate
Wiloughby Hyatt Dickinson†	Progressive
Nathaniel William Hubbard†	Progressive
Sir Harry Bodkin Poland QC (29 October 1895 in place of Ritchie)	Moderate
Earl of Meath (29 March 1898)♦	Moderate
Sir Algernon Edward West (29 March 1898)♦	Progressive
Thomas Bentley Westacott† (29 March 1898)♦	Moderate
Sir William Henry Porter, Bt (24 October 1899 in place of Onslow)	Moderate

♦ Election held to fill three vacancies (Farrer, Hubbard and Lushington)

=== 1898–1904 term ===
Alderman	Party
Lord Tweedmouth‡	Progressive
Dr William Farewell Blake†	Progressive
The Earl Russell	Progressive
Robert Antrobus†	Moderate
Sir Arthur Arnold‡ (died 20 May 1902)	Progressive
Jervoise Athelstane Baines (resigned 25 February 1902)	Moderate
George Dew	Labour Progressive
Harry Gosling	Labour Progressive
Alfred Hoare‡ (resigned 14 November 1899)	Moderate
Rev Charles Fleming Williams‡	Progressive
Lord Ribblesdale (21 November 1899 in place of Hoare)	Progressive
Sir Frederic Lacey Robinson (4 March 1902 in place of Baines)	Moderate
Lord Sandhurst (21 June 1902 in place of Arnold)	Progressive

=== 1901–1907 term ===
Alderman	Party
C. W. Bowerman	Progressive
Wiloughby Dickinson‡	Progressive
Dr Elijah Baxter Forman	Moderate
Sir George David Harris† (died 28 February 1902)	Moderate
Sidney James Mark Low (resigned 24 October 1905)	Moderate
Evan Spicer‡	Progressive
Lord Welby‡	Progressive
Sir Algernon West‡	Progressive
Walter Baldwyn Yates†	Progressive
Sir William James Bell (18 March 1902 in place of Harris)	Moderate
Henry Torrens Anstruther (7 November 1905 in place of Low)	Moderate

=== 1904–1910 term ===
Alderman	Party
Alfred Fowell Buxton	Moderate
Isaac Mitchell (resigned 8 October 1907)	Progressive
Sir Francis Mowatt (resigned 21 July 1907)	Progressive
William Edward Mullins †	Progressive
Sir William Blake Richmond (resigned 21 November 1905)	Progressive
William Stephen Sanders	Progressive
Lord Sandhurst‡ (resigned 2 July 1907)	Progressive
Richard Strong† (resigned 12 March 1907)	Progressive
William Whitaker Thompson	Moderate
Edward White	Moderate
Rev. John Scott Lidgett (5 December 1905 in place of Richmond)	Progressive
Alfred James Shepheard (19 March 1907 in place of Strong)	Progressive
Henry Lorenzo Jephson (23 July 1907)♦	Progressive
Lewin Sharp† (23 July 1907)♦	Progressive
Ben Cooper† (5 November 1907 in place of Mitchell)	Labour Progressive

‡ re-elected alderman
† previously a councillor
♦ Election held to fill two vacancies (Mowatt and Sandhurst)

=== 1907–1913 term ===
Alderman	Party
Henry Torrens Anstruther‡ (resigned 11 October 1910)	Municipal Reform
William St John Fremantle Brodrick (succeeded to title Viscount Midleton 18 April 1907)	Municipal Reform
Vincent Caillard (resigned 19 November 1907)	Municipal Reform
William Hayes Fisher	Municipal Reform
Lord Michelham	Municipal Reform
George King Naylor	Municipal Reform
Captain George Swinton (resigned 5 June 1912)	Municipal Reform
Henry Ward†	Progressive
McKinnon Wood† (resigned 2 March 1909)	Progressive
Sir George Taubman Goldie (26 November 1907 in place of Caillard, resigned 6 February 1912)	Municipal Reform
Hon. Neil Primrose (9 March 1909 in place of Wood)	Progressive
Francis Robert Ince Anderton (25 October 1910 in place of Anstruther)	Municipal Reform
Major Percy Machell (13 February 1912 in place of Goldie)	Municipal Reform
Sir Herbert James Francis Parsons (23 July 1912 in place of Swinton)	Municipal Reform

== Councillors 1907–1919 ==
In 1906 the Moderate grouping was reorganised as the Municipal Reform Party and as such gained a majority and control of the Council in the 1907 elections. Labour Party councillors were also elected for the first time independent of the Progressive Party in 1910. The elections due to be held in 1916 were postponed due to the First World War, and councillors elected in 1913 remained in office until 1919. The Elections and Registration Act 1915 gave the council the power to co-opt members to fill casual vacancies.

The first women who could clearly serve as members were elected as councillors (and as an alderman) in 1910 (Henrietta Adler, Susan Lawrence and Lady St Helier). Prior to the Qualification of Women (County and Borough Councils) Act 1907, the position was in some respects equivocal. Lady Sandhurst had been elected to the Council in 1889, but her election was challenged by petition, and the Court of Appeal ruled that a woman was ineligible for election. Jane Cobden had, however, also been elected in 1889, and Emma Cons had been elected as an alderman in 1889; neither of their elections was challenged within the requisite time limit. The Court of Appeal subsequently held, however, following Lady Sandhurst's case, that any woman who cast a vote would be voting whilst disqualified from holding office, and so liable to a financial penalty for having voted.

Electoral division	Elected 2 March 1907	Party	Elected 5 March 1910	Party	Elected 5 March 1913	Party
City of London	Alderman Francis Stanhope Hanson	Municipal Reform	James William Domoney	Municipal Reform	James William Domoney (died 23 March 1918); Capt Rowland Blades	Municipal Reform
City of London	Herbert Stuart Sankey	Municipal Reform	Herbert Stuart Sankey	Municipal Reform	Herbert Stuart Sankey (resigned 29 April 1913) William Wilson Grantham (elected unopposed 9 May 1913)	Municipal Reform
City of London	Nathaniel Louis Cohen	Municipal Reform	Nathaniel Louis Cohen (resigned 17 October 1911) Hon. Gilbert Johnstone (elected unopposed 30 October 1911)	Municipal Reform	Hon. Gilbert Johnstone (resigned 31 July 1917) J Robarts (co-opted 10 October 1917)	Municipal Reform
City of London	William Henry Pannell	Municipal Reform	William Henry Pannell	Municipal Reform	William Henry Pannell (retired due to ill health, 9 February 1915) Charles Augustin Hanson (elected unopposed 1 March 1915)	Municipal Reform
Battersea and Clapham (Battersea)	Arthur Shirley Benn	Municipal Reform Party	Walter Richard Warren	Progressive	Walter Richard Warren	Progressive
Battersea and Clapham (Battersea)	William J Davies	Progressive	William J Davies	Progressive	William J. West	Progressive
Battersea and Clapham (Clapham)	James William Domoney	Municipal Reform	Lord Dunmore VC	Municipal Reform	H E S Parsons	Municipal Reform
Battersea and Clapham (Clapham)	Sir Clement Kinloch-Cooke	Municipal Reform	Robert Montefiore Sebag-Montefiore	Municipal Reform	Robert Montefiore Sebag-Montefiore (died of wounds received on active service, 19 November 1915) William Henry Peruzzi Gibson (co-opted 7 December 1915)	Municipal Reform
Bethnal Green; North East	Sir Edwin Cornwall MP	Progressive	Garnham Edmonds	Progressive	Garnham Edmonds	Progressive
Bethnal Green; North East	Edward Smith	Progressive	Edward Smith	Progressive	Edward Smith	Progressive
Bethnal Green; South West	Rev. Stewart Duckworth Headlam	Progressive	Rev. Stewart Duckworth Headlam	Progressive	Rev. Stewart Duckworth Headlam	Progressive
Bethnal Green; South West	Percy Alfred Harris	Progressive	Percy Alfred Harris	Progressive	Percy Alfred Harris	Progressive
Camberwell (Dulwich)	Henry Cubitt Gooch	Municipal Reform	Arthur Griffith-Boscawen	Municipal Reform	Lord Massereene	Municipal Reform
Camberwell (Dulwich)	Frederick Hall	Municipal Reform	Frederick Hall MP	Municipal Reform	Cuthbert Wilkinson (died 20 June 1918) Captain Henry Newton Knights	Municipal Reform
Camberwell (North)	Reginald Arthur Bray	Progressive	Reginald Arthur Bray	Progressive	Reginald Arthur Bray	Progressive
Camberwell (North)	Henry Robert Taylor	Progressive	Henry Robert Taylor	Progressive	Henry Robert Taylor	Progressive
Camberwell (Peckham)	Thomas Gautrey	Progressive	Thomas Gautrey	Progressive	Thomas Gautrey	Progressive
Camberwell (Peckham)	William Leonard Dowton	Municipal Reform	Lord Haddo	Progressive	Lord Haddo	Progressive
Chelsea	Thomas Clarence Edward Goff	Municipal Reform	Ernest Louis Meinertzhagen	Municipal Reform	Ernest Louis Meinertzhagen	Municipal Reform
Chelsea	Ronald Collet Norman	Municipal Reform	Ronald Collet Norman	Municipal Reform	Ronald Collet Norman	Municipal Reform
Deptford	Sidney Webb	Progressive	William Freeman Barrett	Municipal Reform	John Theodore Prestige	Municipal Reform
Deptford	Robert Charles Phillimore	Progressive	Edwin Mumford Preston	Municipal Reform	Robert Charles Phillimore	Progressive
Finsbury (Central)	Hon. Fitzroy Hemphill	Progressive	Lawrence William Simpson Rostron	Municipal Reform	Lawrence W S Rostron (retired 14 May 1916 due to ill health); James Little (co-opted 30 May 1916)	Municipal Reform
Finsbury (Central)	Arthur Barnett Russell	Progressive	Arthur Barnett Russell	Progressive	Samuel Joyce Thomas	Municipal Reform
Finsbury (East)	Lt-Col. (later Sir) Alfred Cholmeley Earle Welby	Municipal Reform	Henry Evan Auguste Cotton	Progressive	Henry Evan Auguste Cotton	Progressive
Finsbury (East)	Enos Howes	Municipal Reform	George Masterman Gillett	Progressive	George Masterman Gillett	Progressive
Finsbury (Holborn)	Ernest Wild	Municipal Reform	Robert Inigo Tasker	Municipal Reform	Robert Inigo Tasker (resigned 27 October 1914) Henry Hugh Tasker (elected unopposed 9 November 1914)	Municipal Reform
Finsbury (Holborn)	Hon. Henry Lygon	Municipal Reform	Hon. Henry Lygon	Municipal Reform	Hon. Henry Lygon	Municipal Reform
Fulham	Cyril Stephen Cobb	Municipal Reform	Cyril Stephen Cobb	Municipal Reform	Cyril Stephen Cobb	Municipal Reform
Fulham	Edward George Easton	Municipal Reform	Edward George Easton	Municipal Reform	Edward George Easton (died 2 August 1916) Capt. Henry George Harris (co-opted 31 October 1916)	Municipal Reform
Greenwich	Ion Hamilton Benn	Municipal Reform	George Hopwood Hume	Municipal Reform	George Hopwood Hume	Municipal Reform
Greenwich	Lord Alexander Thynne	Municipal Reform	Lord Hill	Municipal Reform	Lord Hill	Municipal Reform
Hackney (Central)	George Billings	Municipal Reform	Alfred James Shepheard¶	Progressive	William Ray	Municipal Reform
Hackney (Central)	William Burton Stewart	Municipal Reform	Henrietta Adler	Progressive	Henrietta Adler	Progressive
Hackney (North)	Walter Greene	Moderate	Oscar Emanuel Warburg	Municipal Reform	Oscar Emanuel Warburg	Municipal Reform
Hackney (North)	Walter Henry Key	Moderate	George William Henry Jones	Municipal Reform	George William Henry Jones	Municipal Reform
Hackney (South)	Theodore Chapman	Progressive	Theodore Chapman	Progressive	Theodore Chapman	Progressive
Hackney (South)	William Augustus Casson	Progressive	William Augustus Casson	Progressive	George King Naylor¶ (resigned 4 September 1916) Charles Winkley (co-opted 31 October 1916)	Municipal Reform
Hammersmith	Jocelyn Brandon	Municipal Reform	Jocelyn Brandon	Municipal Reform	Francis Robert Ince Anderton¶	Municipal Reform
Hammersmith	Edward Collins	Municipal Reform	Isidore Salmon	Moderate	Isidore Salmon	Municipal Reform
Hampstead	J T Taylor (died 14 September 1908) Andrew Thomas Taylor (elected 24 October 1908)	Municipal Reform	Andrew Thomas Taylor	Municipal Reform	Andrew Thomas Taylor	Municipal Reform
Hampstead	Walter Reynolds	Municipal Reform	Walter Reynolds	Municipal Reform	Walter Reynolds	Municipal Reform
Islington East	Clement Anderson Montague-Barlow	Municipal Reform	Edward Smallwood	Progressive	Edward Smallwood (resigned 10 December 1917) Arthur Christopher Denham (co-opted 18 December 1917)	Progressive
Islington East	Philip Edward Pilditch	Municipal Reform	Arthur Augustus Thomas	Progressive	William Lace Clague	Progressive
Islington North	Frederick Lionel Dove	Municipal Reform	Frederick Lionel Dove	Municipal Reform	Frederick Lionel Dove	Municipal Reform
Islington North	Charles Kenneth Murchison	Municipal Reform	John Cathles Hill (resigned 30 April 1912) Col. Richard Joshua Cooper (elected 13 May 1912)	Municipal Reform	Col. Richard Joshua Cooper	Municipal Reform
Islington South	George Dew	Labour	George Dew	Progressive	George Dew	Progressive
Islington South	Howell Jones Williams	Progressive	Howell Jones Williams	Progressive	Howell Jones Williams	Progressive
Islington West	H J Clarke	Municipal Reform	Richard Cornthwaite Lambert	Progressive	Henry Mills	Progressive
Islington West	Isidore Salmon	Municipal Reform	Henry Lorenzo Jephson¶	Progressive	Henry Lorenzo Jephson (died 31 January 1914) W A Nicholls (elected unopposed 21 February 1914)	Progressive
Kensington North	David Davis	Municipal Reform	David Davis	Municipal Reform	David Davis	Municipal Reform
Kensington North	Major Charles Lancelot Andrewes Skinner	Municipal Reform	Major Charles Lancelot Andrewes Skinner (resigned 7 February 1911) Major Cecil Levita (elected 20 February 1911)	Municipal Reform	Major Cecil Levita	Municipal Reform
Kensington South	Richard Atkinson Robinson¶	Municipal Reform	William Whitaker Thompson¶	Municipal Reform	Augustus Gilbert Colvile	Municipal Reform
Kensington South	Elijah Baxter Forman¶	Municipal Reform	Col. William Frederick Cavaye	Municipal Reform	Col. William Frederick Cavaye	Municipal Reform
Lambeth (Brixton)	William Haydon	Municipal Reform	William Haydon	Municipal Reform	William Haydon	Municipal Reform
Lambeth (Brixton)	Samuel John Gurney Hoare	Municipal Reform	Ernest Gray	Municipal Reform	Major Ernest Gray	Municipal Reform
Lambeth (Kennington)	John Williams Benn MP	Progressive	John Williams Benn MP	Progressive	John Williams Benn MP	Progressive
Lambeth (Kennington)	Rev. Edward Denny	Progressive	Baron Maurice Arnold de Forest	Progressive	Lord Peel	Municipal Reform
Lambeth (North)	Frank S Smith	Labour	Frank S Smith	Labour	Louis Courtauld	Municipal Reform
Lambeth (North)	Frank Briant	Progressive	Frank Briant	Progressive	Frank Briant	Progressive
Lambeth (Norwood)	Cecil Urquhart Fisher	Municipal Reform	Cecil Urquhart Fisher	Municipal Reform	Cecil Urquhart Fisher	Municipal Reform
Lambeth (Norwood)	Forbes St John Morrow	Municipal Reform	Forbes St John Morrow	Municipal Reform	Forbes St John Morrow	Municipal Reform
Lewisham	Lord Lewisham	Municipal Reform	Lord Stanhope	Municipal Reform	Comdr. Carlyon Bellairs Lt-Col. William Henry Le May (elected unopposed 8 May 1915, resigned 21 March 1916) Robert Jackson (co-opted 4 April 1916)	Municipal Reform
Lewisham	Assheton Pownall	Municipal Reform	Frederick Houston Carter	Municipal Reform	Frederick Houston Carter (died 11 March 1918) Richard Owen Roberts (co-opted 15 October 1918)	Municipal Reform
Marylebone East	Lord Duncannon	Municipal Reform	Lord Alexander Thynne	Municipal Reform	Lord Alexander Thynne	Municipal Reform
Marylebone East	James Boyton	Municipal Reform	Lt-Col. Hercules Arthur Pakenham (resigned 13 February 1912) Ernest Ridley Debenham	Municipal Reform	Ernest Ridley Debenham	Municipal Reform
Marylebone West	Lord Henry Bentinck	Municipal Reform	Sir Edward White ¶	Municipal Reform	Sir Edward White (died 14 June 1914) Eustace Widdrington Morrison-Bell (elected unopposed 6 July 1914)	Municipal Reform
Marylebone West	Lord Kerry	Municipal Reform	Susan Lawrence (resigned 23 January 1912) Lord Greville elected at by-election 7 February 1912	Municipal Reform	Lord Greville (resigned 16 May 1916) Ernest Sanger (co-opted 30 May 1916)	Municipal Reform
Newington (Walworth)	James Arthur Dawes	Progressive	James Arthur Dawes MP	Progressive	James Arthur Dawes MP	Progressive
Newington (Walworth)	Charles Jesson	Progressive	Charles Jesson	Progressive	Charles Jesson	Progressive
Newington (West)	Evan Spicer ¶	Progressive	Evan Spicer	Progressive	Evan Spicer	Progressive
Newington (West)	James Daniel Gilbert	Progressive	James Daniel Gilbert	Progressive	James Daniel Gilbert	Progressive
Paddington (North)	Hon. Walter Guinness	Municipal Reform	Thomas Clarence Edward Goff	Moderate	Herbert Lidiard	Moderate
Paddington (North)	John Herbert Hunter	Municipal Reform	John Herbert Hunter	Municipal Reform	John Herbert Hunter	Municipal Reform
Paddington (South)	Sir Richard Melvill Beachcroft	Municipal Reform	John Burgess-Preston Karslake	Municipal Reform	John Burgess-Preston Karslake	Municipal Reform
Paddington (South)	Henry Percy Harris	Municipal Reform	Major Harry Barned Lewis-Barned	Municipal Reform	Major Harry Barned Lewis-Barned	Municipal Reform
St George's Hanover Square	Lord Cheylesmore	Municipal Reform	Lord Cheylesmore	Municipal Reform	Lord Cheylesmore	Municipal Reform
St George's Hanover Square	Hubert John Greenwood	Municipal Reform	Hubert John Greenwood	Municipal Reform	Hubert John Greenwood	Municipal Reform
St Pancras (East)	Albert William Claremont	Progressive	Albert William Claremont	Progressive	Albert William Claremont	Progressive
St Pancras (East)	Rev. Frederick Hastings	Progressive	Hugh Cecil Lea	Progressive	Henry de Rosenbach Walker	Progressive
St Pancras (North)	Dr R M Beaton	Progressive	Arthur Lewis Leon	Progressive	Arthur Lewis Leon	Progressive
St Pancras (North)	David Sydney Waterlow MP	Progressive	Thomas Frederick Hobson	Progressive	Thomas Frederick Hobson	Progressive
St Pancras (South)	George Alexander	Municipal Reform	George Alexander	Municipal Reform	David Davies	Municipal Reform
St Pancras (South)	Frank Goldsmith	Municipal Reform	John Denison-Pender	Municipal Reform	John Denison-Pender	Municipal Reform
St Pancras (West)	Percy Vosper	Municipal Reform	William Lloyd-Taylor	Progressive	Captain Auberon Claud Hegan Kennard	Municipal Reform
St Pancras (West)	Felix Cassel	Municipal Reform	Samuel Lithgow	Progressive	Lord Windsor	Municipal Reform
Shoreditch (Haggerston)	Hon. Gilbert Johnstone	Municipal Reform	Arthur Acland Allen	Progressive	David Blackley	Progressive
Shoreditch (Haggerston)	Hon. Rupert Guinness	Municipal Reform	Stephen Gee	Progressive	Henry Ward	Progressive
Shoreditch (Hoxton)	Dr John Davies	Municipal Reform	Benjamin B Evans	Progressive	Oswald Lewis	Progressive
Shoreditch (Hoxton)	Ernest Gray	Municipal Reform	Joseph Stanley Holmes	Progressive	Joseph Stanley Holmes	Progressive
Southwark (Bermondsey)	Dr Alfred Salter	Progressive	Hon. Charles Russell	Progressive	Montague Shearman junior	Progressive
Southwark (Bermondsey)	Arthur Acland Allen	Progressive	W H Ecroyd	Progressive	W H Ecroyd	Progressive
Southwark (Rotherhithe)	Ambrose Pomeroy	Progressive	Rev. John Scott Lidgett ¶	Progressive	Rev. John Scott Lidgett	Progressive
Southwark (Rotherhithe)	Harold Glanville	Progressive	R L Stuart	Progressive	R L Stuart	Progressive
Southwark (West)	Thomas Hunter	Progressive	Thomas Hunter	Progressive	Thomas Hunter	Progressive
Southwark (West)	Albert Wilson	Progressive	Albert Wilson	Progressive	Albert Wilson (died 16 July 1918) Consuelo, Duchess of Marlborough(co-opted 15 October 1918)	Progressive
Strand	Lord Elcho	Municipal Reform	Philip Edward Pilditch	Municipal Reform	Philip Edward Pilditch	Municipal Reform
Strand	Clifford Probyn	Municipal Reform	Clifford Probyn	Municipal Reform	Clifford Probyn (died 10 February 1918) John Maria Gatti (co-opted 5 March 1918)	Municipal Reform
Tower Hamlets (Bow and Bromley)	William Stanley Macbean Knight	Municipal Reform	George Lansbury	Labour	Frank Herbert Baber	Municipal Reform
Tower Hamlets (Bow and Bromley)	Henry Vincent Rowe	Municipal Reform	George Lewis Bruce	Progressive	George Malcolm Hilbery (resigned 9 March 1917) W C Bersey (co-opted 3 April 1917)	Municipal Reform
Tower Hamlets (Limehouse)	Cyril Jackson	Municipal Reform	Cyril Jackson	Municipal Reform	Benjamin B Evans (resigned 15 December 1914) H Marks (elected unopposed 14 January 1915)	Progressive
Tower Hamlets (Limehouse)	John Rolleston Lort-Williams	Municipal Reform	Alfred William Yeo	Progressive	Alfred William Yeo	Progressive
Tower Hamlets (Mile End)	R H Montgomery	Municipal Reform	Carl Stettauer	Progressive	Carl Stettauer (died 24 July 1913)	Progressive
Tower Hamlets (Mile End)	R H Montgomery	Municipal Reform	Carl Stettauer	Progressive	George Albert Dutfield (elected at by-election 13 August 1913, resigned 18 July 1916) George Bettesworth Piggott (co-opted 1 May 1917)	Municipal Reform
Tower Hamlets (Mile End)	Edward Holton Coumbe	Municipal Reform	James May	Progressive	T W Wickham	Progressive
Tower Hamlets (Poplar)	Will Crooks MP	Progressive	Robert Charles Kirkwood Ensor	Labour	St John Hutchinson	Progressive
Tower Hamlets (Poplar)	Sir John McDougall	Progressive	Sir John McDougall	Progressive	Susan Lawrence	Labour
Tower Hamlets (St George's in the East)	Harry Gosling	Progressive	Harry Gosling	Progressive	Harry Gosling	Progressive
Tower Hamlets (St George's in the East)	Percy Coleman Simmons	Municipal Reform	Charles James Mathew	Progressive	Charles James Mathew	Progressive
Tower Hamlets (Stepney)	Alfred Ordway Goodrich	Municipal Reform	Alfred Ordway Goodrich	Municipal Reform	Alfred Ordway Goodrich	Municipal Reform
Tower Hamlets (Stepney)	Frederick Leverton Harris	Municipal Reform	John Sankey	Municipal Reform	Hon. A Chichester (resigned 7 December 1915) D Hazel (co-opted 21 December 1915)	Municipal Reform
Tower Hamlets (Whitechapel)	Henry Herman Gordon	Progressive	Henry Herman Gordon	Progressive	Henry Herman Gordon	Progressive
Tower Hamlets (Whitechapel)	William Cowlishaw Johnson	Progressive	William Cowlishaw Johnson	Progressive	William Cowlishaw Johnson	Progressive
Wandsworth	Sir William John Lancaster	Municipal Reform	John William Lorden	Municipal Reform	Edwin Evans	Municipal Reform
Wandsworth	William Hunt	Municipal Reform	William Hunt	Municipal Reform	Alfred Cooper Rawson	Municipal Reform
Westminster	Clement Young Sturge	Municipal Reform	Clement Young Sturge (died 23 July 1911) Percy George Gates (elected unopposed 16 October 1911)	Municipal Reform	Percy George Gates	Municipal Reform
Westminster	Hon. William Robert Peel	Municipal Reform	Reginald White Granville-Smith	Municipal Reform	Reginald White Granville-Smith	Municipal Reform
Woolwich	William James Squires	Municipal Reform	William James Squires	Municipal Reform	William James Squires	Municipal Reform
Woolwich	Edward Aubrey Hastings Jay	Municipal Reform	Edward Aubrey Hastings Jay (resigned 7 November 1911) Howard Kingsley Wood (elected 22 November 1911)	Municipal Reform	Howard Kingsley Wood	Municipal Reform

¶ Previously an alderman.

=== Party strength 1907–1919 ===
The strength of the parties on the council after each election was as follows:

Party	Councillors 1907	Aldermen 1907	Total 1907	Councillors 1910	Aldermen 1910	Total 1910	Councillors 1913	Aldermen 1913	Total 1913
Municipal Reform	79	11	90	60	17	77	67	15	88
Progressive	37	8	45	55	2	57	49	4	53
Labour	1	0	1	3	0	3	2	0	2
Independents	1	0	1	0	0	0	0	0	0

== County aldermen 1910–1919 ==
Ten aldermen were appointed in 1910 and nine in 1913 to serve a six-year term. Elections due in 1916 were postponed until 1919, and vacancies were filled by co-option.

Year of election	Alderman	Party	Notes
1910	Arthur Shirley Benn	Municipal Reform	Defeated candidate at the election
1910	Alfred Fowell Buxton	Municipal Reform	
1910	Harold Cox	Municipal Reform	Resigned 16 July 1912
1910	Geoffrey Drage	Municipal Reform	
1910	John William Gilbert	Municipal Reform	
1910	Bernard Henry Holland	Municipal Reform	
1910	Frederick Rogers	Municipal Reform	
1910	Henry Vincent Rowe	Municipal Reform	
1910	Lady St Helier	Municipal Reform	
1910	Percy Coleman Simmons	Municipal Reform	Defeated candidate at the election
1912	Lord Monk Bretton	Municipal Reform	co-opted to fill vacancy
1912	Henry L Cripps	Municipal Reform	co-opted to fill vacancy. Resigned 1913
1912	Maurice George Carr Glyn	Municipal Reform	co-opted to fill vacancy. Resigned 1914
1912	Major Percy Wilfrid Machell	Municipal Reform	co-opted to fill place of Sir George Goldie, resigned.
1913	Cyril Jackson	Municipal Reform	resigned 1916
1913	William Hunt	Municipal Reform	
1913	Sir Herbert James Francis Parsons	Municipal Reform	
1913	Jessie Wilton Phipps	Municipal Reform	
1913	Sir George Dashwood Taubman Goldie	Municipal Reform	
1913	Lord Chelmsford	Municipal Reform	Previous a councillor for South Kensington
1913	Oswald Partington	Progressive	
1913	Alfred Henry Scott	Progressive	
1913	George Alexander Hardy	Progressive	
1913	Katharine Wallas	Progressive	To serve until 1916 in place of Henry L Cripps, resigned
1915	Howard Willmott Liversidge	Municipal Reform	co-opted to serve in place of Lord Monk Bretton, resigned
1916	Francis Capel Harrison	Municipal Reform	co-opted to serve until 1919 in place of Cyril Jackson, resigned

== See also ==
- 1901 London County Council election
- 1910 London County Council election
- 1913 London County Council election
- List of members of London County Council 1919–37
- List of members of London County Council 1937–49
- List of members of London County Council 1949–65
- List of chairmen of the London County Council
