= Stepney (London County Council constituency) =

London County Council constituency

- Former constituency for the London County Council

Former constituency
- Created: 1889; 1949
- Abolished: 1919; 1965
- Member(s): 3
- Created from: Limehouse, Mile End and Whitechapel and St George's
- Replaced by: Limehouse, Mile End and Whitechapel and St George's

Stepney was a constituency used for elections to the London County Council between 1889 and 1919, and again from 1949 until the council's abolition, in 1965. The seat shared boundaries with the UK Parliament constituency of the same name.

== Councillors ==
Year	Name	Party	Name	Party
1889	William Spencer Beaumont	Moderate	Benjamin Francis Conn Costelloe	Progressive
1892	W. C. Steadman	Progressive	Walter Baldwyn Yates	Progressive
1901	W. C. Steadman	Progressive	Alfred Thomas Williams	Conservative
1904	W. C. Steadman	Progressive	James Harris	Conservative
1905	W. C. Steadman	Progressive	Alfred Ordway Goodrich	Municipal Reform
1907	Leverton Harris	Municipal Reform	Alfred Ordway Goodrich	Municipal Reform
1910	John Sankey	Municipal Reform	Alfred Ordway Goodrich	Municipal Reform
1913	Arthur Chichester	Municipal Reform	Alfred Ordway Goodrich	Municipal Reform
1915	David Hazel	Municipal Reform	Alfred Ordway Goodrich	Municipal Reform

Year	Name	Party	Name	Party	Name	Party
1949	Jeremiah Long	Labour	Jack Oldfield	Labour	Louise Reeve	Labour
1958	Alice King	Labour	Alfred Dennis Kirby	Labour	Alfred Ernest Sealey	Labour
1961	Alice King	Labour	Alfred Dennis Kirby	Labour	Cyril Bird	Labour

== Election results ==
=== 1889–1919 ===
1889 London County Council election: Stepney
Party	Candidate	Votes	%	±%
Moderate	William Spencer Beaumont	1,808		
Progressive	Benjamin Francis Conn Costelloe	1,322		
Progressive	James Woollen	1,316		
Moderate	John Dewson Kemp	1,185		
Moderate win (new seat)				
Progressive win (new seat)				

1892 London County Council election: Stepney
Party	Candidate	Votes	%	±%
Progressive	W. C. Steadman	1,828		
Progressive	Walter Baldwyn Yates	1,714		
Moderate	John Loftus	1,260		
Moderate	John Dewson Kemp	1,222		
Progressive hold		Swing		
Progressive gain from Moderate		Swing		

1895 London County Council election: Stepney
Party	Candidate	Votes	%	±%
Progressive	W. C. Steadman	1,763		
Progressive	Walter Baldwyn Yates	1,664		
Moderate	John Loftus	1,595		
Moderate	Stanley Boulter	1,568		
Progressive hold		Swing		
Progressive hold		Swing		

1898 London County Council election: Stepney
Party	Candidate	Votes	%	±%
Progressive	W. C. Steadman	1,955		
Progressive	Walter Baldwyn Yates	1,855		
Conservative	Evans Gordon	1,648		
Conservative	H. T. A. Chidgey	1,534		
Progressive hold		Swing		
Progressive hold		Swing		

1901 London County Council election: Stepney
Party	Candidate	Votes	%	±%
Progressive	W. C. Steadman	1,943	26.4	−1.6
Conservative	Alfred Thomas Williams	1,842	25.1	+1.5
Progressive	Walter Baldwyn Yates	1,792	24.4	−2.1
Conservative	Edward Emanuel Micholls	1,774	24.1	+2.2
Progressive hold		Swing		
Conservative gain from Progressive		Swing	+1.8	

1904 London County Council election: Stepney
Party	Candidate	Votes	%	±%
Progressive	W. C. Steadman	2,004		
Conservative	James Harris	1,960		
Conservative	T. M. Kirkwood	1,942		
Progressive	Harold Spender	1,874		
Majority				
Conservative hold		Swing		
Progressive hold		Swing		

1907 London County Council election: Stepney
Party	Candidate	Votes	%	±%
Municipal Reform	Alfred Ordway Goodrich	2,366		
Municipal Reform	Leverton Harris	2,292		
Progressive	C. S. Stettaner	1,485		
Progressive	C. Watson	1,386		
Majority				
Municipal Reform gain from Progressive		Swing		
Municipal Reform hold		Swing		

1910 London County Council election: Stepney
Party	Candidate	Votes	%	±%
Municipal Reform	Alfred Ordway Goodrich	1,809		
Municipal Reform	John Sankey	1,758		
Progressive	William Glyn-Jones	1,646		
Progressive	J. M. Myers	1,524		
Majority				
Municipal Reform hold		Swing		
Municipal Reform hold		Swing		

1913 London County Council election: Stepney
Party	Candidate	Votes	%	±%
Municipal Reform	Alfred Ordway Goodrich	1,827		
Municipal Reform	Arthur Chichester	1,805		
Progressive	J. S. Henry	1,667		
Progressive	George Hardy	1,630		
British Socialist Party	Joseph George Butler	108		
British Socialist Party	Alf Watts	105		
Majority				
Municipal Reform hold		Swing		
Municipal Reform hold		Swing		

=== 1949–1965 ===
1949 London County Council election: Stepney
Party	Candidate	Votes	%	±%
Labour	Jack Oldfield	13,926		
Labour	Jeremiah Long	13,886		
Labour	Louise Reeve	13,450		
Communist	Jack Gaster	5,621		
Communist	Michael Shapiro	5,442		
Communist	Ted Bramley	5,391		
Conservative	J. Harvey-Kelly	3,426		
Conservative	H. S. Eyre	3,104		
Conservative	Theodore Magnus Wechsler	2,781		
Independent	H. J. Greenbaum	617		
Labour win (new seat)				
Labour win (new seat)				
Labour win (new seat)				

1952 London County Council election: Stepney
Party	Candidate	Votes	%	±%
Labour	Jack Oldfield	9,504		
Labour	Jeremiah Long	9,470		
Labour	Louise Reeve	8,928		
Communist	Arnold Posner	1,902		
Communist	Jack Gaster	1,531		
Communist	Max Levitas	1,495		
Conservative	E. J. Emden	1,391		
Conservative	P. Buckminster	1,328		
Conservative	D. Denning	1,298		
Independent	Mohammed Abbas Ali	226		
Labour hold		Swing		
Labour hold		Swing		
Labour hold		Swing		

1955 London County Council election: Stepney
Party	Candidate	Votes	%	±%
Labour	Jeremiah Long	8,347		
Labour	Jack Oldfield	8,300		
Labour	Louise Reeve	7,872		
Communist	Arnold Posner	1,419		
Communist	Max Levitas	1,367		
Communist	Solly Kaye	1,314		
Conservative	E. G. Emden	1,041		
Conservative	R. G. Gee	991		
Conservative	L. Black	986		
Liberal	T. Lamb	377		
Liberal	M. Pugachow	340		
Liberal	M. Isaaman	293		
Labour hold		Swing		
Labour hold		Swing		
Labour hold		Swing		

1958 London County Council election: Stepney
Party	Candidate	Votes	%	±%
Labour	Alice King	8,912		
Labour	Alfred Dennis Kirby	8,892		
Labour	Alfred Ernest Sealey	8,471		
Communist	Solly Kaye	1,673		
Conservative	A. J. Lyons	1,159		
Conservative	M. Wigoder	810		
Conservative	R. L. Johnson	784		
Labour hold		Swing		
Labour hold		Swing		
Labour hold		Swing		

1961 London County Council election: Stepney
Party	Candidate	Votes	%	±%
Labour	Alice King	8,269		
Labour	Alfred Dennis Kirby	8,008		
Labour	Cyril Bird	7,067		
Communist	Solly Kaye	2,018		
Conservative	A. J. Lyons	1,939		
Conservative	B. Calwell	1,891		
Conservative	F. Hughes	1,282		
Liberal	W. Bogan	1,245		
Liberal	M. Dove	1,070		
Liberal	J. W. Gibbs	955		
Labour hold		Swing		
Labour hold		Swing		
Labour hold		Swing		
