= Westminster (London County Council constituency) =

Local government constituency, 1889–1919

- Former constituency for the London County Council

Former constituency
- Created: 1889
- Abolished: 1919
- Member(s): 2
- Replaced by: Westminster Abbey and Westminster St George's

Westminster was a constituency used for elections to the London County Council between 1889 and 1919. The seat shared boundaries with the UK Parliament constituency of the same name.

== Councillors ==
Year	Name	Party	Name	Party
1889	Walter Eugene de Souza	Moderate	Vernon James Watney	Moderate
1892	Walter Eugene de Souza	Moderate	Henry Fox-Strangways	Moderate
1895	Walter Eugene de Souza	Moderate	Lionel Holland	Moderate
1897	Louis Henry Hayter	Moderate	Lionel Holland	Moderate
1898	Louis Henry Hayter	Moderate	Reginald White Granville-Smith	Moderate
1904	Clement Young Sturge	Municipal Reform	Reginald White Granville-Smith	Moderate
1907	Clement Young Sturge	Municipal Reform	William Peel	Municipal Reform
1910	Clement Young Sturge	Municipal Reform	Reginald White Granville-Smith	Municipal Reform
1911	Percy Gates	Municipal Reform	Reginald White Granville-Smith	Municipal Reform

== Election results ==
1889 London County Council election: Westminster
Party	Candidate	Votes	%	±%
Moderate	Walter de Souza	1,539		
Moderate	Vernon James Watney	1,482		
Progressive	John Coppen	1,415		
Progressive	Ashley Ponsonby	1,184		
Independent	David de Pinna	455		
Independent	William Lewis Josephs	88		
Moderate win (new seat)				
Moderate win (new seat)				

1892 London County Council election: Westminster
Party	Candidate	Votes	%	±%
Moderate	Walter de Souza	2,074		
Moderate	Henry Fox-Strangways	1,979		
Progressive	G. Stewart Ross	1,514		
Moderate hold		Swing		
Moderate hold		Swing		

1895 London County Council election: Westminster
Party	Candidate	Votes	%	±%
Moderate	Walter de Souza	2,224		
Moderate	Lionel Holland	2,150		
Progressive	C. de Selincourt	1,251		
Moderate hold		Swing		
Moderate hold		Swing		

1898 London County Council election: Westminster
Party	Candidate	Votes	%	±%
Moderate	Louis Henry Hayter	2,212		
Moderate	Reginald White Granville-Smith	2,190		
Progressive	T. Bremner	789		
Moderate hold		Swing		

1901 London County Council election: Westminster
Party	Candidate	Votes	%	±%
Conservative	Louis Henry Hayter	1,509	35.3	−7.3
Conservative	Reginald White Granville-Smith	1,485	34.7	−7.5
Progressive	Charles Langstein Heywood	883	20.7	+5.5
Temperance	John George Chappell	399	9.3	n/a
Conservative hold		Swing		
Conservative hold		Swing	-6.5	

1904 London County Council election: Westminster
Party	Candidate	Votes	%	±%
Conservative	Reginald White Granville-Smith	2,006		
Conservative	Clement Young Sturge	1,935		
Labour	Charles Langstein Heywood	1,192		
Labour	Charles Duncan	1,169		
Majority				
Conservative hold		Swing		

1907 London County Council election: Westminster
Party	Candidate	Votes	%	±%
Municipal Reform	William Peel	3,419		
Municipal Reform	Clement Young Sturge	3,392		
Progressive	W. B. Campbell	1,299		
Progressive	E. Herrin	1,298		
Majority				
Municipal Reform hold		Swing		

1910 London County Council election: Westminster
Party	Candidate	Votes	%	±%
Municipal Reform	Reginald White Granville-Smith	2,907		
Municipal Reform	Clement Young Sturge	2,828		
Progressive	William Wheeler	1,018		
Progressive	Charles Langstein Heywood	1,014		
Majority				
Municipal Reform hold		Swing		

1913 London County Council election: Westminster
Party	Candidate	Votes	%	±%
Municipal Reform	Reginald White Granville-Smith	3,310		
Municipal Reform	Percy George Gates	3,228		
Progressive	Mabel St Clair Stobart	1,199		
Progressive	Lionel Gurney Buxton	1,168		
Majority				
Municipal Reform hold		Swing		
Municipal Reform hold		Swing		
