= St Pancras South (London County Council constituency) =

Former London constituency (1889-1919)

- Former constituency for the London County Council

Former constituency
- Created: 1889
- Abolished: 1919
- Member(s): 2
- Replaced by: St Pancras South East and St Pancras South West

St Pancras South was a constituency used for elections to the London County Council between 1889 and 1919. The seat shared boundaries with the UK Parliament constituency of the same name.

== Councillors ==
Year	Name	Party	Name	Party
1889	John Hutton	Progressive	Robert William Edis	Moderate
1892	John Hutton	Progressive	Frank Sheffield	Progressive
1895	John Hutton	Progressive	John Blundell Maple	Moderate
1901	Frank Sheffield	Progressive	Henry Charles Somers Augustus Somerset	Progressive
1904	William Gastrell	Conservative	Frank Goldsmith	Municipal Reform
1907	George Alexander	Municipal Reform	Frank Goldsmith	Municipal Reform
1910	George Alexander	Municipal Reform	John Denison-Pender	Municipal Reform
1913	David Davies	Municipal Reform	John Denison-Pender	Municipal Reform

== Election results ==
1889 London County Council election: St Pancras South
Party	Candidate	Votes	%	±%
Progressive	John Hutton	1,672		
Moderate	Robert William Edis	1,322		
Moderate	W. H. Matthews	620		
Moderate	James Samuel Burroughes	577		
Social Democratic Federation	William Walter Bartlett	277		
Progressive win (new seat)				
Moderate win (new seat)				

1892 London County Council election: St Pancras South
Party	Candidate	Votes	%	±%
Progressive	John Hutton	1,935		
Progressive	Frank Sheffield	1,648		
Moderate	Robert William Edis	1,150		
Moderate	Charles Cochrane-Baillie	1,038		
Independent	Henry Lazarus	235		
Progressive hold		Swing		
Progressive gain from Moderate		Swing		

1895 London County Council election: St Pancras South
Party	Candidate	Votes	%	±%
Progressive	John Hutton	1,774		
Moderate	John Blundell Maple	1,749		
Progressive	Frank Sheffield	1,648		
Moderate	R. A. Germaine	1,576		
Progressive hold		Swing		
Moderate gain from Progressive		Swing		

1898 London County Council election: St Pancras South
Party	Candidate	Votes	%	±%
Progressive	John Hutton	2,036		
Moderate	John Blundell Maple	1,830		
Social Democratic Federation	James MacDonald	494		
Progressive hold		Swing		
Moderate hold		Swing		

1901 London County Council election: St Pancras South
Party	Candidate	Votes	%	±%
Progressive	Frank Sheffield	1,750	26.1	
Progressive	Henry Somerset	1,709	25.5	
Conservative	William Gastrell	1,624	24.3	
Conservative	Charles Fitzroy Doll	1,612	24.1	
Progressive hold		Swing		
Progressive gain from Conservative		Swing		

1904 London County Council election: St Pancras South
Party	Candidate	Votes	%	±%
Conservative	William Gastrell	1,927		
Conservative	Frank Goldsmith	1,808		
Progressive	George Bernard Shaw	1,460		
Progressive	W. Geary	1,412		
Majority				
Conservative hold		Swing		
Conservative hold		Swing		

1907 London County Council election: St Pancras South
Party	Candidate	Votes	%	±%
Municipal Reform	George Alexander	2,963		
Municipal Reform	Frank Goldsmith	2,897		
Progressive	Silvester Horne	1,267		
Progressive	G. Giddens	1,583		
Majority				
Municipal Reform hold		Swing		

1910 London County Council election: St Pancras South
Party	Candidate	Votes	%	±%
Municipal Reform	George Alexander	2,719		
Municipal Reform	John Denison-Pender	2,633		
Progressive	Frederick Hastings	1,281		
Progressive	Charles James Tarring	1,267		
Majority				
Municipal Reform hold		Swing		

1913 London County Council election: St Pancras South
Party	Candidate	Votes	%	±%
Municipal Reform	David Davies	2,360		
Municipal Reform	John Cuthbert Denison-Pender	2,307		
Progressive	George Frederick Cosburn	1,353		
Progressive	Thomas Charles	1,307		
Majority				
Municipal Reform hold		Swing		
Municipal Reform hold		Swing		
