= Westminster St George's (London County Council constituency) =

London County Council constituency

- Former constituency for the London County Council

Former constituency
- Created: 1889
- Abolished: 1949
- Member(s): 2
- Replaced by: Cities of London and Westminster

Westminster St George's, known until 1919 as St George's Hanover Square, was a constituency used for elections to the London County Council between 1889 and 1949. The seat shared boundaries with the UK Parliament constituency of the same name.

== Councillors ==
Year	Name	Party	Name	Party
1889	Robert Antrobus	Moderate	Howard Vincent	Moderate
1896	Robert Antrobus	Moderate	Henry Legge	Moderate
1898	William Henry Christopher Payne	Moderate	Henry Legge	Moderate
1901	John Dickson-Poynder	Conservative	Hubert Greenwood	Conservative
1904	John Dickson-Poynder	Conservative	Francis Leigh	Conservative
1907	Herbert Eaton	Municipal Reform	Hubert Greenwood	Municipal Reform
1919	Richard Joshua Cooper	Municipal Reform	Hubert Greenwood	Municipal Reform
1925	Evelyn Boscawen	Municipal Reform	Hubert Greenwood	Municipal Reform
1928	Evelyn Boscawen	Municipal Reform	Isabel Mary Lawrence	Municipal Reform
1931	Barrie Lambert	Municipal Reform	John Moore-Brabazon	Municipal Reform
1932	Barrie Lambert	Municipal Reform	Edmund Wood	Municipal Reform
1946	Henry Brooke	Municipal Reform	Anthony Kershaw	Municipal Reform

== Election results ==
1889 London County Council election: St George's Hanover Square
Party	Candidate	Votes	%	±%
Moderate	Robert Antrobus	unopposed	N/A	N/A
Moderate	Howard Vincent	unopposed	N/A	N/A
Moderate win (new seat)				
Moderate win (new seat)				

1892 London County Council election: St George's Hanover Square
Party	Candidate	Votes	%	±%
Moderate	Robert Antrobus	unopposed	N/A	N/A
Moderate	Howard Vincent	unopposed	N/A	N/A
Moderate hold		Swing		
Moderate hold		Swing		

1895 London County Council election: St George's Hanover Square
Party	Candidate	Votes	%	±%
Moderate	Robert Antrobus	3,051		
Moderate	Howard Vincent	3,009		
Progressive	E. Burch	1,267		
Moderate hold		Swing		
Moderate hold		Swing		

1898 London County Council election: St George's Hanover Square
Party	Candidate	Votes	%	±%
Moderate	Robert Antrobus	3,143		
Moderate	Henry Legge	3,086		
Progressive	L. V. Biggs	1,038		
Progressive	C. L. Heywood	1,032		
Moderate hold		Swing		

1901 London County Council election: St George's Hanover Square
Party	Candidate	Votes	%	±%
Conservative	John Dickson-Poynder	2,395	36.6	−6.4
Conservative	Hubert Greenwood	2,365	36.2	−6.2
Progressive	Edwyn Scudamore-Stanhope	1,414	21.6	+7.3
Independent	P. H. Saunders	361	5.5	n/a
Conservative hold		Swing		
Conservative hold		Swing	-6.8	

1904 London County Council election: St George's Hanover Square
Party	Candidate	Votes	%	±%
Conservative	Hubert Greenwood	3,144		
Conservative	Francis Leigh	3,113		
Progressive	Maurice Towneley-O'Hagan	1,911		
Progressive	R. G. Webster	1,852		
Independent	S. Copp	87		
Majority				
Conservative hold		Swing		

1907 London County Council election: St George's Hanover Square
Party	Candidate	Votes	%	±%
Municipal Reform	Herbert Eaton	5,445		
Municipal Reform	Hubert Greenwood	5,375		
Progressive	William Craven	1,384		
Progressive	T. E. Morris	1,348		
Majority				
Municipal Reform hold		Swing		

1910 London County Council election: St George's Hanover Square
Party	Candidate	Votes	%	±%
Municipal Reform	Herbert Eaton	4,283		
Municipal Reform	Hubert Greenwood	4,243		
Progressive	Henry Thomas Mackenzie Bell	912		
Progressive	James Scott Duckers	884		
Majority				
Municipal Reform hold		Swing		

1913 London County Council election: St George's Hanover Square
Party	Candidate	Votes	%	±%
Municipal Reform	Lord Cheylesmore	4,335		
Municipal Reform	Hubert Greenwood	4,279		
Progressive	Henry Thomas Mackenzie Bell	821		
Majority				
Municipal Reform hold		Swing		
Municipal Reform hold		Swing		

1919 London County Council election: Westminster St George's
Party	Candidate	Votes	%	±%
Municipal Reform	Richard Joshua Cooper	Unopposed	n/a	n/a
Municipal Reform	Hubert Greenwood	Unopposed	n/a	n/a
Municipal Reform hold		Swing	n/a	
Municipal Reform hold		Swing	n/a	

1922 London County Council election: Westminster St George's
Party	Candidate	Votes	%	±%
Municipal Reform	Richard Joshua Cooper	Unopposed	n/a	n/a
Municipal Reform	Hubert Greenwood	Unopposed	n/a	n/a
Municipal Reform hold		Swing	n/a	
Municipal Reform hold		Swing	n/a	

1925 London County Council election: Westminster St George's
Party	Candidate	Votes	%	±%
Municipal Reform	Evelyn Boscawen	6,891		n/a
Municipal Reform	Hubert Greenwood	6,833		n/a
Labour	Mary Carlin	901		n/a
Labour	Jessie Stephen	872		n/a
Municipal Reform hold		Swing	n/a	
Municipal Reform hold		Swing	n/a	

1928 London County Council election: Westminster St George's
Party	Candidate	Votes	%	±%
Municipal Reform	Evelyn Boscawen	Unopposed	n/a	n/a
Municipal Reform	Isabel Mary Lawrence	Unopposed	n/a	n/a
Municipal Reform hold		Swing	n/a	
Municipal Reform hold		Swing	n/a	

1931 London County Council election: Westminster St George's
Party	Candidate	Votes	%	±%
Municipal Reform	Barrie Lambert	Unopposed	n/a	n/a
Municipal Reform	John Moore-Brabazon	Unopposed	n/a	n/a
Municipal Reform hold		Swing	n/a	
Municipal Reform hold		Swing	n/a	

1934 London County Council election: Westminster St George's
Party	Candidate	Votes	%	±%
Municipal Reform	Barrie Lambert	7,224		n/a
Municipal Reform	Edmund Wood	7,216		n/a
Labour	D. G. Biggs	1,261		n/a
Labour	J. Wild	1,241		n/a
Municipal Reform hold		Swing	n/a	
Municipal Reform hold		Swing	n/a	

1937 London County Council election: Westminster St George's
Party	Candidate	Votes	%	±%
Municipal Reform	Edmund Wood	9,159		
Municipal Reform	Barrie Lambert	9,059		
Labour	J. E. Connal	1,457		
Labour	E. D. Rhodes	1,436		
Independent	S. Burke	272		
Municipal Reform hold		Swing	n/a	
Municipal Reform hold		Swing	n/a	

1946 London County Council election: Westminster St George's
Party	Candidate	Votes	%	±%
Conservative	Henry Brooke	Unopposed	n/a	n/a
Conservative	Anthony Kershaw	Unopposed	n/a	n/a
Conservative hold		Swing	n/a	
Conservative hold		Swing	n/a	
