= Southwark South East =

Southwark South East may refer to:

- Southwark South East (London County Council constituency)
- Southwark South East (UK Parliament constituency)
