= Westminster Abbey (London County Council constituency) =

London County Council constituency

- Former constituency for the London County Council

Former constituency
- Created: 1919
- Abolished: 1949
- Member(s): 2
- Created from: Strand and Westminster
- Replaced by: Cities of London and Westminster

Westminster Abbey was a constituency used for elections to the London County Council between 1919 and 1949. The seat shared boundaries with the UK Parliament constituency of the same name.

== Councillors ==
Year	Name	Party	Name	Party
1919	John Maria Gatti	Municipal Reform	Reginald White Granville-Smith	Municipal Reform
1925	John Maria Gatti	Municipal Reform	James Cornelius Dalton	Municipal Reform
1929	Samuel Gluckstein	Municipal Reform	James Cornelius Dalton	Municipal Reform
1937	Samuel Gluckstein	Municipal Reform	Frank Rye	Municipal Reform

== Election results ==
1919 London County Council election: Westminster Abbey
Party	Candidate	Votes	%	±%
Municipal Reform	Reginald White Granville-Smith	Unopposed	n/a	n/a
Municipal Reform	John Maria Gatti	Unopposed	n/a	n/a
Municipal Reform hold		Swing	n/a	
Municipal Reform hold		Swing	n/a	

1922 London County Council election: Westminster Abbey
Party	Candidate	Votes	%	±%
Municipal Reform	Reginald White Granville-Smith	7,399	42.5	
Municipal Reform	John Maria Gatti	7,301	42.0	
Labour	John Hanbury Martin	1,360	7.8	n/a
Labour	Agnes Dawson	1,332	7.7	n/a
Majority		5,941	34.2	n/a
Municipal Reform hold		Swing	n/a	
Municipal Reform hold		Swing	n/a	

1925 London County Council election: Westminster Abbey
Party	Candidate	Votes	%	±%
Municipal Reform	James Cornelius Dalton	5,775		
Municipal Reform	John Maria Gatti	5,739		
Labour	Leah L'Estrange Malone	1,236		
Labour	Kathleen Starr	1,224		
Majority				
Municipal Reform hold		Swing		
Municipal Reform hold		Swing		

1928 London County Council election: Westminster Abbey
Party	Candidate	Votes	%	±%
Municipal Reform	James Cornelius Dalton	5,767		
Municipal Reform	John Maria Gatti	5,726		
Labour	W. Madeley	1,225		
Labour	Francis Henry Wiltshire	1,222		
Liberal	D. Millett	661		
Liberal	Lucien Fior	646		
Independent Labour	Winifred Utley	355		
Independent Labour	G. T. Usher	353		
Majority				
Municipal Reform hold		Swing		
Municipal Reform hold		Swing		

Westminster Abbey by-election, 1929
Party	Candidate	Votes	%	±%
Municipal Reform	Samuel Gluckstein	3,782		
Labour	Morgan Ignatius Finucane	2,259		
Majority		1,523		
Municipal Reform hold		Swing		

1931 London County Council election: Westminster Abbey
Party	Candidate	Votes	%	±%
Municipal Reform	James Cornelius Dalton	Unopposed	n/a	n/a
Municipal Reform	Samuel Gluckstein	Unopposed	n/a	n/a
Municipal Reform hold		Swing	n/a	
Municipal Reform hold		Swing	n/a	

1934 London County Council election: Westminster Abbey
Party	Candidate	Votes	%	±%
Municipal Reform	James Cornelius Dalton	5,982		n/a
Municipal Reform	Samuel Gluckstein	5,955		n/a
Labour	Ambrose Appelbe	1,763		n/a
Labour	William Smith Kennedy	1,759		n/a
Municipal Reform hold		Swing	n/a	
Municipal Reform hold		Swing	n/a	

1937 London County Council election: Westminster Abbey
Party	Candidate	Votes	%	±%
Municipal Reform	Samuel Gluckstein	7,547		
Municipal Reform	Frank Rye	7,492		
Labour	William Smith Kennedy	2,833		
Labour	R. C. S. Ellison	2,451		
Municipal Reform hold		Swing		
Municipal Reform hold		Swing		

1946 London County Council election: Westminster Abbey
Party	Candidate	Votes	%	±%
Conservative	Frank Rye	4,889		
Conservative	Samuel Gluckstein	4,833		
Labour	Olga Peters	2,283		
Labour	R. G. Evans	2,235		
Conservative hold		Swing		
Conservative hold		Swing		
