= Hammersmith (London County Council constituency) =

London County Council constituency

- Former constituency for the London County Council

Former constituency
- Created: 1889
- Abolished: 1919
- Member(s): 2
- Replaced by: Hammersmith North; Hammersmith South

Hammersmith was a constituency used for elections to the London County Council between 1889 and 1919. The seat shared boundaries with the UK Parliament constituency of the same name.

== Councillors ==
Year	Name	Party	Name	Party
1889	Andrew Arter	Moderate	Charles Courtenay Cramp	Moderate
1892	Andrew Arter	Moderate	William Bull	Moderate
1895	Edward Goulding	Moderate	William Bull	Moderate
1901	Jocelyn Brandon	Moderate	Edward Collins	Moderate
1910	Jocelyn Brandon	Moderate	Isidore Salmon	Municipal Reform
1913	Francis Robert Ince Anderton	Municipal Reform	Isidore Salmon	Municipal Reform

== Election results ==
1889 London County Council election: Hammersmith
Party	Candidate	Votes	%	±%
Moderate	Charles Courtenay Cramp	1,591		
Moderate	Andrew Arter	1,569		
Progressive	Charles Cordingley	1,539		
Moderate	William Frederick Layton	1,127		
Independent	Robert Francis Webb	388		
Moderate win (new seat)				
Moderate win (new seat)				

1892 London County Council election: Hammersmith
Party	Candidate	Votes	%	±%
Moderate	Andrew Arter	2,562		
Moderate	William Bull	2,391		
Progressive	John Johnson	2,372		
Progressive	Thomas Parris	2,366		
Progressive	James Flexman	411		
Independent	Ferdinand Leopold Martin Firminger	208		
Moderate hold		Swing		
Moderate hold		Swing		

1895 London County Council election: Hammersmith
Party	Candidate	Votes	%	±%
Moderate	William Bull	3,429		
Moderate	Edward Goulding	3,356		
Progressive	Edmund Charles Rawlings	2,682		
Progressive	L. Sharpe	2,648		
Moderate hold		Swing		
Moderate hold		Swing		

1898 London County Council election: Hammersmith
Party	Candidate	Votes	%	±%
Moderate	William Bull	4,168		
Moderate	Edward Goulding	4,121		
Progressive	Frank Russell	3,197		
Progressive	R. G. Head	3,164		
Moderate hold		Swing		
Moderate hold		Swing		

1901 London County Council election: Hammersmith
Party	Candidate	Votes	%	±%
Conservative	Edward Collins	3,128	26.1	−2.4
Conservative	Jocelyn Brandon	3,110	25.9	−2.2
Progressive	William Turner Lord	2,885	24.0	+2.2
Progressive	Edmund Charles Rawlings	2,874	24.0	+2.4
Conservative hold		Swing		
Conservative hold		Swing	-2.3	

1904 London County Council election: Hammersmith
Party	Candidate	Votes	%	±%
Conservative	Jocelyn Brandon	3,501		
Conservative	Edward Collins	3,494		
Progressive	John Gerald Ritchie	3,483		
Progressive	F. Whelen	3,392		
Conservative hold		Swing		
Conservative hold		Swing		

1907 London County Council election: Hammersmith
Party	Candidate	Votes	%	±%
Municipal Reform	Jocelyn Brandon	5,850		
Municipal Reform	Edward Collins	5,839		
Progressive	Norman Shairp	2,755		
Progressive	L. E. Camp	2,709		
Labour	W. T. Davidson	897		
Labour	John Thomas Westcott	737		
Majority				
Municipal Reform hold		Swing		
Municipal Reform hold		Swing		

1910 London County Council election: Hammersmith
Party	Candidate	Votes	%	±%
Municipal Reform	Jocelyn Brandon	5,815	33.5	
Municipal Reform	Isidore Salmon	5,654	32.6	
Progressive	Ben Cooper	2,960	17.0	
Progressive	D. R. Thomas	2,936	16.9	
Majority				
Municipal Reform hold		Swing		
Municipal Reform hold		Swing		

1913 London County Council election: Hammersmith
Party	Candidate	Votes	%	±%
Municipal Reform	Francis Robert Ince Anderton	5,615	29.8	−3.7
Municipal Reform	Isidore Salmon	5,609	29.7	−2.9
Progressive	W. P. Hunter	3,937	20.9	+3.9
Progressive	Glynne Williams	3,703	19.6	+2.7
Majority		1,672	8.9	
Municipal Reform hold		Swing		
Municipal Reform hold		Swing	-3.3	
