= Walworth (London County Council constituency) =

London County Council constituency

- Former constituency for the London County Council

Former constituency
- Created: 1889
- Abolished: 1919
- Member(s): 2
- Replaced by: Southwark South East

Walworth was a constituency used for elections to the London County Council between 1889 and 1919. The seat shared boundaries with the UK Parliament constituency of the same name.

== Councillors ==
Year	Name	Party	Name	Party
1889	John Marsland	Progressive	William Saunders	Progressive
1895	Richard Parker	Progressive	Russell Spokes	Progressive
1904	Arthur William Jephson	Progressive	Russell Spokes	Progressive
1906	James Dawes	Progressive	Charles Jesson	Progressive

== Election results ==
1889 London County Council election: Walworth
Party	Candidate	Votes	%	±%
Progressive	John Marsland	1,912		
Progressive	William Saunders	1,787		
Moderate	John Pain	1,031		
Moderate	Edward Yates	866		
Social Democratic Federation	Harry Quelch	100		
Progressive win (new seat)				
Progressive win (new seat)				

1892 London County Council election: Walworth
Party	Candidate	Votes	%	±%
Progressive	John Marsland	2,155		
Progressive	William Saunders	2,067		
Moderate	John Pain	1,088		
Moderate	Thomas Dale Hart	972		
Social Democratic Federation	Nelson Palmer	76		
Independent	Joseph Chapman	59		
Progressive hold		Swing		
Progressive hold		Swing		

1895 London County Council election: Walworth
Party	Candidate	Votes	%	±%
Progressive	Richard Parker	2,044		
Progressive	Russell Spokes	2,031		
Moderate	Percy Gates	1,412		
Moderate	E. J. Hewitt	1,392		
Progressive hold		Swing		
Progressive hold		Swing		

1898 London County Council election: Walworth
Party	Candidate	Votes	%	±%
Progressive	Russell Spokes	2,172		
Progressive	Richard Parker	2,166		
Moderate	Hugh Hole	1,229		
Moderate	Thomas Brooke-Hitching	1,292		
Progressive hold		Swing		

1901 London County Council election: Walworth
Party	Candidate	Votes	%	±%
Progressive	Russell Spokes	2,607	33.8	+2.5
Progressive	Richard Parker	2,566	33.3	+2.0
Conservative	Selwyn Joseph Willis	1,251	16.2	−2.5
Conservative	Richard Edgcumbe	1,239	16.2	−1.9
Progressive hold		Swing		
Progressive hold		Swing	+2.2	

1904 London County Council election: Walworth
Party	Candidate	Votes	%	±%
Progressive	Russell Spokes	2,484		
Progressive	Arthur William Jephson	2,425		
Conservative	J. Youldon	1,754		
Conservative	Porter Smith	1,641		
Majority				
Progressive hold		Swing		

1907 London County Council election: Walworth
Party	Candidate	Votes	%	±%
Progressive	James Arthur Dawes	2,823		
Progressive	Charles Jesson	2,819		
Municipal Reform	F. Oldfield	2,337		
Municipal Reform	Collingwood Sproule	2,235		
Social Democratic Federation	J. Clarke	187		
Majority				
Progressive hold		Swing		

1910 London County Council election: Walworth
Party	Candidate	Votes	%	±%
Progressive	James Arthur Dawes	2,981		
Progressive	Charles Jesson	2,868		
Municipal Reform	Frederick Bird	2,029		
Municipal Reform	Collingwood Sproule	1,980		
Majority				
Progressive hold		Swing		

1913 London County Council election: Walworth
Party	Candidate	Votes	%	±%
Progressive	James Arthur Dawes	2,575		
Progressive	Charles Jesson	2,476		
Municipal Reform	Frederick Bird	2,199		
Municipal Reform	G. Aspinall	2,114		
Majority				
Progressive hold		Swing		
Progressive hold		Swing		
