= Evan Spicer =

British politician

Evan Spicer

Sir Evan Spicer DL JP (20 April 1849 – 22 December 1937) was a British Liberal and London Progressive politician who served for 30 years on the London County Council.

== Background ==
Spicer was the son of James Spicer. He was educated at Mill Hill School. In 1873 he married Annie Whitley. They had four sons and two daughters. He was knighted in 1917.

== Political career ==
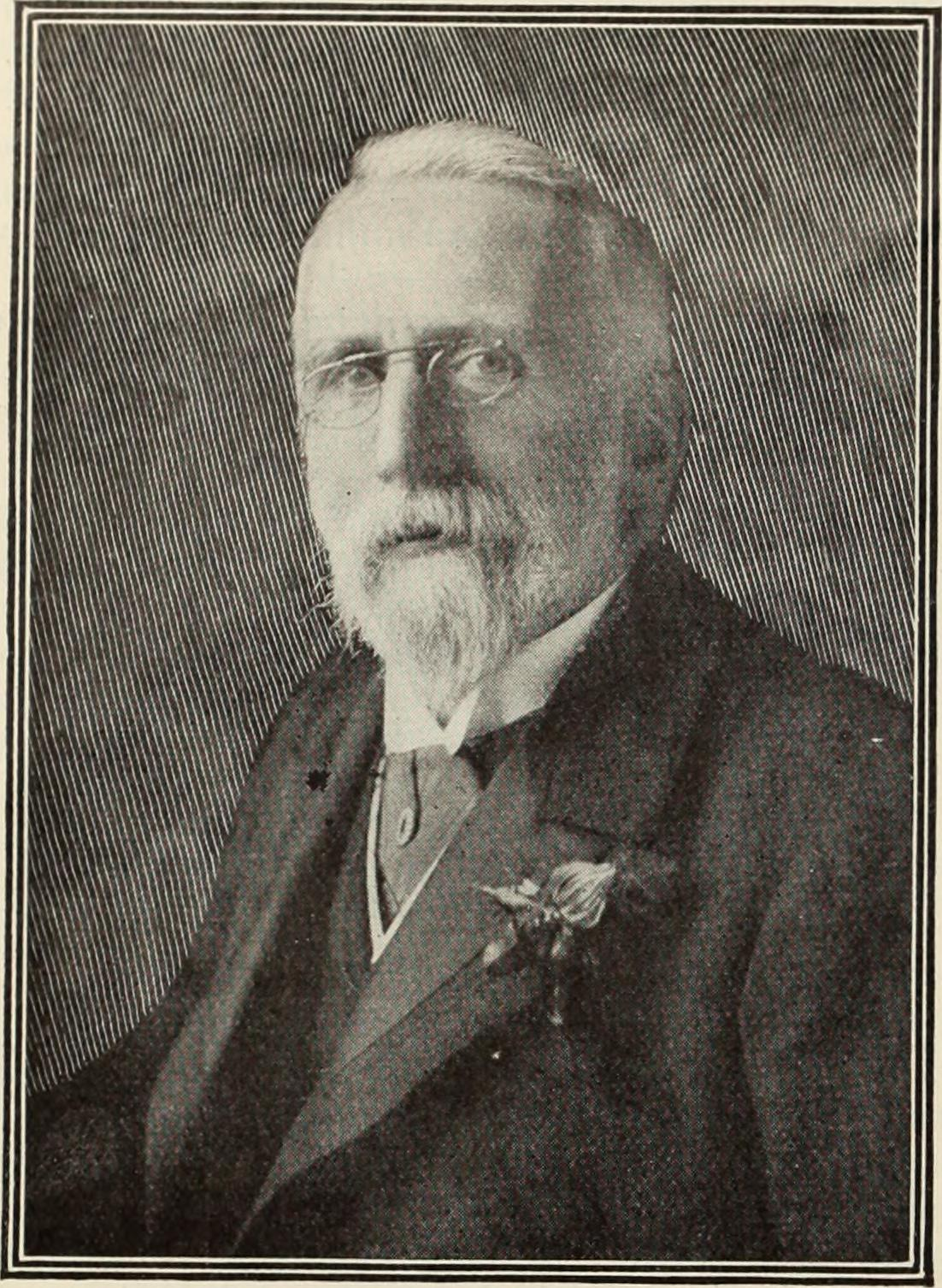
Evan Spicer (c. 1906)

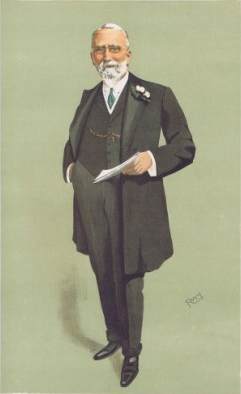
Vanity Fair caricature of Spicer (1912)

Spicer was a Progressive Party member of the London County Council from its inception in 1889 until his retirement in 1919. In 1889 he was one of the inaugural Aldermanic appointments. He served three consecutive terms as an Alderman, covering 1889–1907. In 1907, he was elected to the LCC as a Councillor representing Newington West. He served three consecutive terms as a Councillor, covering 1907–1919. On the LCC he was Chairman of Finance from 1892 to 1895. He served as Vice-Chairman of the LCC from 1906 to 1906 and chairman from 1906 to 1907. Despite being assured of an Aldermanic seat, he also chose to run as a Progressive candidate at the LCC elections; In the 1901 London County Council election he ran in the heavily Conservative constituency of the City of London.

Spicer was Liberal candidate for the Dulwich division at the December 1910 General Election.

He was knighted in the 1916 Prime Minister's Resignation Honours.

=== Electoral record ===
1901 London County Council election: City of London
Party	Candidate	Votes	%	±%
Conservative	Frederick Prat Alliston	3,325	18.8	−2.2
Conservative	Henry Clarke	3,290	18.6	−2.0
Conservative	Alfred Louis Cohen	3,251	18.4	−2.1
Conservative	Herbert Stuart Sankey	3,138	17.8	−2.8
Progressive	Lord Welby	2,341	13.2	+4.6
Progressive	Evan Spicer	2,327	13.2	+4.7
Conservative hold		Swing	-3.5	

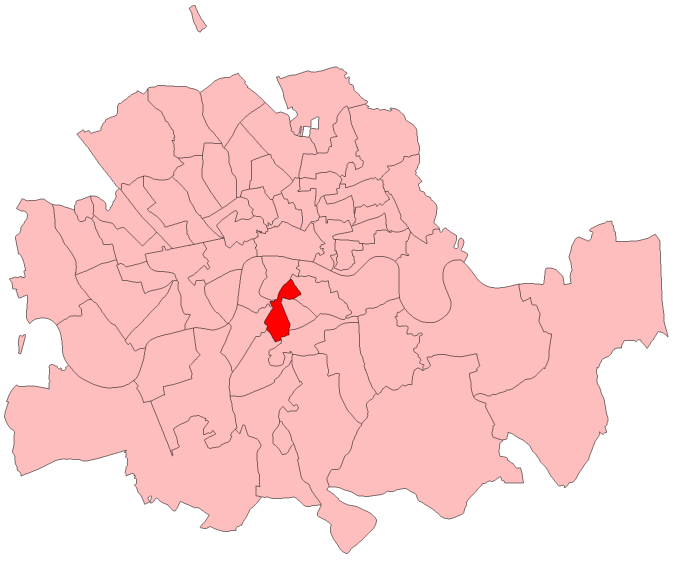
Newington West in London 1907–1919

1910 London County Council election: Newington West
Party	Candidate	Votes	%	±%
Progressive	James Daniel Gilbert	3,540		
Progressive	Evan Spicer	3,536		
Municipal Reform	Frank Henry Baber	2,483		
Municipal Reform	Richard Owen Roberts	2,470		
Majority				
Progressive hold		Swing		

1913 London County Council election: Newington West
Party	Candidate	Votes	%	±%
Progressive	James Daniel Gilbert	3,161		
Progressive	Evan Spicer	3,097		
Municipal Reform	Edgar Abbott	2,268		
Municipal Reform	Richard Owen Roberts	2,222		
Majority				
Progressive hold		Swing		

Political offices
Preceded by Ralph Lingen	Chairman of the Finance Committee of London County Council; 1892–1895	Succeeded by
