= William Haydon =

New Zealand cricketer (1872–1904)

Personal information
- Full name: William Henry Haydon
- Born: 30 July 1872; Dunedin, Otago, New Zealand
- Died: 19 April 1904 (aged 31); Dunedin, Otago, New Zealand
- Role: Wicket-keeper

Domestic team information
- Years: Team
- 1895/96–1897/98: Otago
- Source: ESPNcricinfo, 14 May 2016

William Henry Haydon (30 July 1872 – 19 April 1904) was a New Zealand lawyer and cricketer. He played four first-class matches for Otago between the 1895–96 and 1897–98 seasons.

Haydon was born at Dunedin in 1872, the son of another William Henry Haydon. His father had emigrated from England, first to Australia in the 1850s before arriving in Dunedin during the Otago gold rush of the 1860s. He had run a series of hotels in Otago. Haydon junior was educated at St Patrick's College in Wellington before attending Otago University where he studied law and constitutional history and was a prominent rugby footballer. He worked initially as a legal clerk in Dunedin before being admitted to the bar shortly before his death in 1904.

Considered a "well known" sportsman, as well as rugby Haydon played club cricket for the Grange club and later for Dunedin Cricket Club and rowed with the Dunedin Amateur Boating Club. He played cricket for an Otago side against Southland in February 1894 before making his first-class debut for the side two years later, playing in a fixture against Canterbury at Carisbrook in February 1896. A wicket-keeper, Haydon played twice for the representative side the following season and once in 1898–99. In total he scored 37 runs and effected six dismissals in his four first-class matches. He was a rugby referee and a prominent member of the Otago Referees' Association. Away from sports, he was a member of the St Joseph's Dramatic Society in Dunedin.

Haydon suffered from dyspepsia and was taken ill suddenly at work in April 1904. He died later the same day of peritonitis caused by his underlying condition. He was aged 31, though papers at the time note his age as 32.
