= Southwark South East (London County Council constituency) =

London County Council constituency

- Former constituency for the London County Council

Former constituency
- Created: 1919
- Abolished: 1949
- Member(s): 2
- Created from: Walworth
- Replaced by: Southwark

Southwark South East was a constituency used for elections to the London County Council between 1919 and 1949. The seat shared boundaries with the UK Parliament constituency of the same name.

== Councillors ==
Year	Name	Party	Name	Party
1919	John Morris	Progressive	William James Pincombe	Progressive
1925	Stella Churchill	Labour	Lewis Silkin	Labour
1932	George Strauss	Labour	Lewis Silkin	Labour
1946	Albert Bernard Kennedy	Labour	Mary Ormerod	Labour

== Election results ==
1919 London County Council election: Southwark South East
Party	Candidate	Votes	%	±%
Progressive	John Morris	1,864	39.0	
Progressive	William James Pincombe	1,864	39.0	
Labour	Benjamin Embleton	1,053	22.0	
Majority		811	17.0	
Progressive hold		Swing		
Progressive hold		Swing		

1922 London County Council election: Southwark South East
Party	Candidate	Votes	%	±%
Progressive	William James Pincombe	3,261	27.4	−12.2
Progressive	John Osborne	3,215	27.1	−11.9
Labour	G. J. Chaplin	2,703	22.8	+0.8
Labour	W. H. Lock	2,693	22.7	n/a
Majority		512	4.3	−12.7
Progressive hold		Swing		
Progressive hold		Swing		

1925 London County Council election: Southwark South East
Party	Candidate	Votes	%	±%
Labour	Stella Churchill	4,460		
Labour	Lewis Silkin	4,449		
Municipal Reform	Frederick Bird	2,437		
Municipal Reform	B. H. Mills	2,162		
Progressive	William James Pincombe	1,715		
Progressive	John Osborne	1,562		
Majority				
Labour gain from Progressive		Swing		
Labour gain from Progressive		Swing		

1928 London County Council election: Southwark South East
Party	Candidate	Votes	%	±%
Labour	Stella Churchill	5,662		
Labour	Lewis Silkin	5,639		
Liberal	W. Bremer	1,642		
Liberal	William John Squire	1,597		
Municipal Reform	Arthur Duckworth	1,429		
Municipal Reform	F. G. Harrold	1,409		
Majority				
Labour hold		Swing		
Labour hold		Swing		

1931 London County Council election: Southwark South East
Party	Candidate	Votes	%	±%
Labour	Stella Churchill	3,325		
Labour	Lewis Silkin	3,325		
Anti-Socialist	G. Toomey	1,479		
Anti-Socialist	G. Young	1,463		
Organised Unemployed	R. I. H. Bishop	234		
Organised Unemployed	Bert Aylward	221		
Majority				
Labour hold		Swing		
Labour hold		Swing		

1934 London County Council election: Southwark South East
Party	Candidate	Votes	%	±%
Labour	Lewis Silkin	5,065		
Labour	George Strauss	4,926		
Municipal Reform	R. Russell	1,393		
Municipal Reform	Edward Jessel	1,370		
Majority				
Labour hold		Swing		
Labour hold		Swing		

1937 London County Council election: Southwark South East
Party	Candidate	Votes	%	±%
Labour	Lewis Silkin	6,111		
Labour	George Strauss	5,979		
Municipal Progressive	Furse	2,284		
Municipal Progressive	E. S. Adamson	2,252		
Majority				
Labour hold		Swing		
Labour hold		Swing		

1946 London County Council election: Southwark South East
Party	Candidate	Votes	%	±%
Labour	Albert Bernard Kennedy	2,838		
Labour	Mary Ormerod	2,794		
Conservative	James Greenwood	752		
Conservative	H. Russell	723		
Majority				
Labour hold		Swing		
Labour hold		Swing		
