= Alfred Fowell Buxton =

British banker and local politician

Chairman of the London County Council
- In office 1916–1917
- Preceded by: Cyril Jackson
- Succeeded by: Robert Crewe-Milnes, 1st Marquess of Crewe

Chairman of the Finance Committee of London County Council
- In office 1907
- Preceded by: Reginald Welby, 1st Baron Welby
- Succeeded by: Hayes Fisher, 1st Baron Downham
- In office 1920
- Preceded by: George Goldie
- Succeeded by: John Maria Gatti

Personal details
- Born: 28 March 1854
- Died: 5 May 1952 (aged 98)

Alfred Fowell Buxton (1854–1952)

Alfred Fowell Buxton (28 March 1854 – 5 May 1952) was a British banker and local politician.

He was the son of Thomas Fowell Buxton and his wife Rachel Jane née Gurney of Easneye House near Ware, Hertfordshire. He was educated at Rugby School and Trinity College, Cambridge, graduating in 1877. He was to retain strong links with Rugby: he married Violet Jex-Blake, daughter of the school's then headmaster, Thomas Jex-Blake in 1885 and from 1906 to 1936 was one of the school's governors. Violet Buxton OBE was the niece of Sophia Jex-Blake, suffragist and first woman medical graduate in UK.

== Career ==
On leaving Cambridge Buxton entered banking in the City of London, eventually becoming an extraordinary director of the National Provincial Bank. He joined the board of the Alliance Assurance Company in 1919, retiring in 1948, aged 94.

In 1892 he was elected to the London County Council as one of four councillors representing the City of London. He served a single three-year term until 1895, but returned to the council as an alderman in 1904, serving until 1922. In 1916–1917 he was Chairman of the County Council.

Outside politics and business, Buxton was a leading member of the Church of England: he was a member of House of Laity of the General Synod, and of the Church of England Pensions Board. He made his home at Fairhill, Hildenborough, near Tonbridge, Kent. He had three children: Patrick Alfred Buxton, who became the Director of Entomology at the London School of Hygiene & Tropical Medicine, Denis Alfred Jex, a wing commander in the Royal Air Force and amateur archaeologist and Violet Elizabeth. A great-great-granddaughter is Dame Cressida Dick, former Commissioner of the Metropolitan Police Service.

Buxton died in 1952 aged 98.

Political offices
Preceded by Cyril Jackson	Chairman of the London County Council; 1916 – 1917	Succeeded by Marquess of Crewe
Preceded by Reginald Welby	Chairman of the Finance Committee of London County Council; 1907	Succeeded by Hayes Fisher
Preceded by George Goldie	Chairman of the Finance Committee of London County Council; 1920	Succeeded by John Maria Gatti
