= Sir Herbert Parsons, 1st Baronet =

British businessman and politician (1870–1940)

Sir Herbert James Francis Parsons, 1st Baronet (9 September 1870 – 2 February 1940) was a British businessman and politician.

Parsons was the son of George Henry Parsons and Ruth Bridges. In 1892 he inherited his father's manufacturing chemist and pharmaceutical business, Ashton & Parsons. He was also an underwriter at Lloyd's of London.

He was honorary colonel of the 3rd City of London Regiment between 1911 and 1923. Parsons was appointed a Knight Bachelor on 1 January 1912. In July 1912 he was elected to fill a vacancy as a Municipal Reform Party alderman on the London County Council. During the First World War, he helped to raise two volunteer battalions and volunteered with the Red Cross. On 24 June 1918, Parsons was created a baronet, of Winton Lodge in the Baronetage of the United Kingdom "for public and patriotic services" in the 1918 Birthday Honours. He resigned from the council in July 1920. Parsons' title became extinct upon his death.

Baronetage of the United Kingdom
New creation	Baronet (of Winton Lodge); 1918–1940	Extinct
