= List of newspapers named Daily Chronicle =

Daily Chronicle may refer to:

- Daily Chronicle (United Kingdom), a British newspaper which merged into the News Chronicle
- Daily Chronicle (Illinois), a newspaper in DeKalb County, Illinois
- Daily Chronicle (New Zealand), a newspaper in New Zealand
- Spokane Daily Chronicle, a newspaper in Spokane, Washington published from 1881 until 1992
- The Chronicle (Centralia, Washington), a newspaper in Centralia, Washington
