= Cecil Levita =

British soldier (1867–1953)

Sir Cecil Levita KCVO CBE DL
- Born: Cecil Bingham Levita; 18 January 1867
- Died: 10 October 1953 (aged 86); Hove, East Sussex, England, UK
- Relatives: Lieutenant Colonel Harry Plumridge Levita c. 1862–1919 (brother)
- Military career
- Allegiance: United Kingdom of Great Britain and Ireland
- Branch: British Army
- Rank: Lieutenant-colonel
- Conflicts: Second Matabele War; Second Boer War; World War I
- Awards: Knight Commander of the Royal Victorian Order; Commander of the Order of the British Empire
- Political party: Municipal Reform Party
- Other political affiliations: Liberal Unionist Party

Sir Cecil Bingham Levita KCVO CBE DL (18 January 1867 – 10 October 1953) was a British soldier and public service worker who eventually rose to be chairman of the London County Council in 1928.

== Career ==
=== British Army ===
Levita attended the Royal Military Academy, Woolwich and was commissioned a lieutenant in the Royal Artillery in 1886. He started his career as a soldier serving in the Second Matabele War and the Second Boer War where he was A.D.C. to Lieutenant-General Sir Baker Russell. He was later appointed a special service officer and a D.A.A.G. in the Natal Field Force. He was mentioned in dispatches and awarded the Queen's medal with three clasps. He was created an MVO in 1901, and promoted to Major 5 February 1902. He retired from the army in October 1909. During the First World War he was recalled from the reserve to serve as General Staff Officer. After the war he was awarded the honorary rank of lieutenant colonel and made a CBE for "valuable services rendered in connection with the War".

=== Politics ===
In 1910 Levita contested the St. Ives division of Cornwall in the General Election as a Liberal Unionist but was unsuccessful. However, in 1911 he was elected at a by-election to the London County Council as a member of the Conservative-backed Municipal Reform Party, where he represented North Kensington for over 25 years. He sat on numerous committees including serving as chairman of the housing committee and chairman of the London County Council from 1928 to 1929. He was Knighted at the end of his term as chairman for "public and political services". He was largely responsible for founding the King George Hospital in Ilford to serve the population of the large LCC estate at Becontree. Levita was appointed a KCVO in 1932

=== "Talking Mongoose Case" ===
His career was somewhat overshadowed by an episode in 1936 which became known as the "Talking Mongoose Case". Levita had alleged that Richard S. Lambert, the founding editor of The Listener was unfit to serve on the board of the British Film Institute (on which his wife served) because Lambert had published an article about a house which was supposedly haunted by Gef the talking mongoose. Lambert then brought an action for slander against Levita which he continued to pursue despite pressure from Sir Stephen Tallents, controller of administration and the chairman of the BBC Ronald Collet Norman who was a friend of Levita's. Lambert won substantial damages and the case prompted an enquiry launched by then Prime Minister into the rights of a public corporation to control the extraneous activities of their employees. The enquiry resulted in practices of the Civil Service being implemented within the BBC.

== Family ==
On 30 May 1917 Levita married Florence Woodruff, widow of George Aman of Bucharest and daughter of William Robb. The couple had one son and one daughter.

He died at his home in Hove, Sussex in October 1953 aged 86.

Political offices
Preceded by John Maria Gatti	Chairman of the London County Council; 1928–1929	Succeeded by Lord Monk Bretton
