= Walter Baldwyn Yates =

Walter Baldwyn Yates

Walter Baldwyn Yates CBE (13 May 1857 – 27 April 1947) was an English barrister, member of the London County Council and Crown Umpire under the Unemployment Insurance Scheme of 1911.

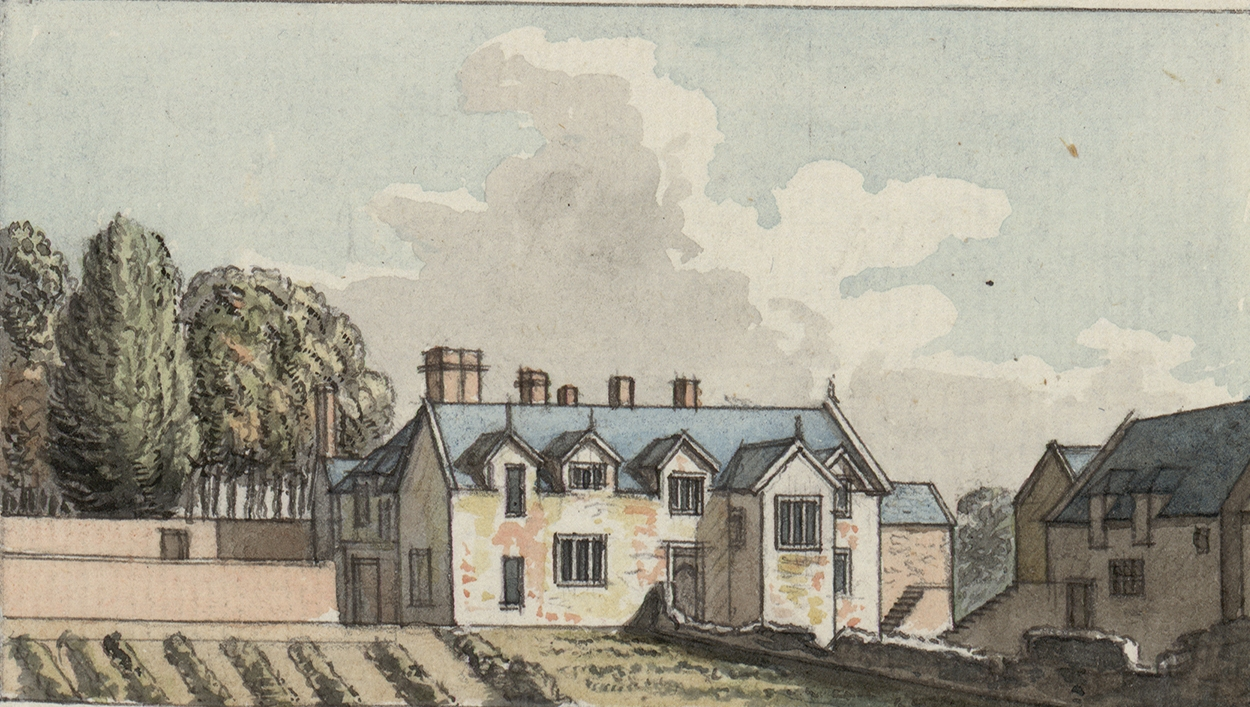
Cilcen hall

== Life and career ==
Born in 1857 at Wellbank, Sandbach, Cheshire, he was the youngest son of Joseph St. John Yates, County Court Judge, and his wife Emily Augusta Scott. His father was a descendant of Sir Joseph Yates (1722–1770) and his wife Elizabeth Baldwyn. He was educated at Shrewsbury School and Trinity College, Cambridge. He was called to the bar to the Inner Temple in 1881. Initially practicing on the North Wales Circuit, he entered local government and was elected as a member of the London County Council for Tower Hamlets for three terms in 1892, 1895 & 1898 for the Progressive Party, and in 1901, was elected a County Alderman for a six-year term. In 1910 he was appointed the first chairman of the Trade Boards under the Trade Boards Act 1909 and worked as arbitrator in many industrial disputes. In 1912 he was appointed Crown Umpire under the National Insurance Act 1911 and held this post until 1923. Yates decided over 1,800 cases under the 1911 act and over 4,000 under the Unemployment Insurance Act 1920 as well over 6,000 decisions of claims for out of work donation. His work made up a large volume of case law on the interpretation of the acts and on their application. He was appointed a Companion of the Order of the British Empire (CBE) in the 1924 Birthday Honours, a year after his retirement, and was made Chancellor of the Diocese of Bangor in 1942. He was also DL, JP, and Deputy Chairman of Quarter Sessions for Flintshire.

In 1896 he married Rose Caroline, widow of Walter Howman Buddicom, daughter of John Scott Bankes of Soughton Hall, Northop, Flintshire, a descendant of Lord Chancellor John Scott, 1st Earl of Eldon and John Wynne, Bishop of St Asaph and Bath and Wells, and sister of the Right Hon. Sir John Eldon Bankes, Lord Justice of Appeal. They resided at Cilcen Hall, Mold, Flintshire and had three daughters, one of whom, Elizabeth, married Brigadier John Montgomerie Hunt of the 5th battalion, 2nd Punjab Regiment, Indian Army, who were the parents of Admiral Sir Nicholas Hunt, and grandparents of the Right Hon. Jeremy Hunt MP.
