= Reginald Welby, 1st Baron Welby =

British noble and politician

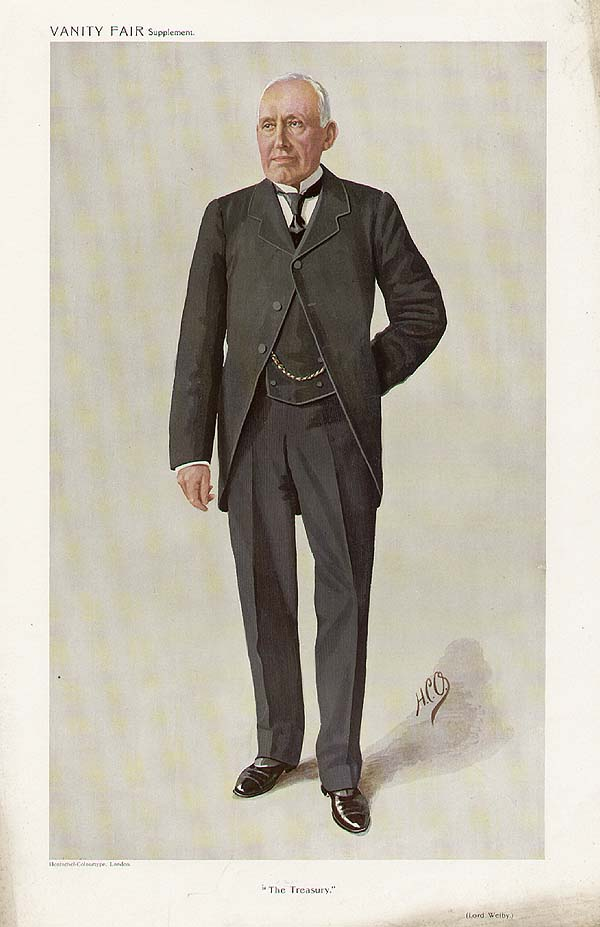
"The Treasury" Lord Welby as caricatured in Vanity Fair, March 1910

Reginald Earle Welby, 1st Baron Welby GCB, PC (3 August 1832 – 30 October 1915) was a British peer, former Permanent Secretary to the Treasury and former President of the Royal Statistical Society.

== Early life and education ==
Born in his father's rectory at Harston in Leicestershire, he was the seventh child of the Reverend John Earle Welby (1786–1867), a younger son of Sir William Earle Welby, 1st Baronet. His mother was Felicia Elizabetha Hole (1797–1888), the daughter of the Reverend Humphrey Aram Hole (1763–1814) and his wife Sarah Horne (1775–1853), daughter of George Horne, Bishop of Norwich. His younger sister, Felicia Elizabetha Welby (1835–1927), became the wife of Montague Bertie, 11th Earl of Lindsey.

Welby was educated at Eton College where he became known amongst his friends as a "great footballer". He then went up to Trinity College, Cambridge, hoping for a career as a barrister following graduation, although his hopes never realised themselves. Instead he entered the Civil Service as a clerk in the Treasury in 1856 having graduated from Cambridge in 1855.

== Career ==
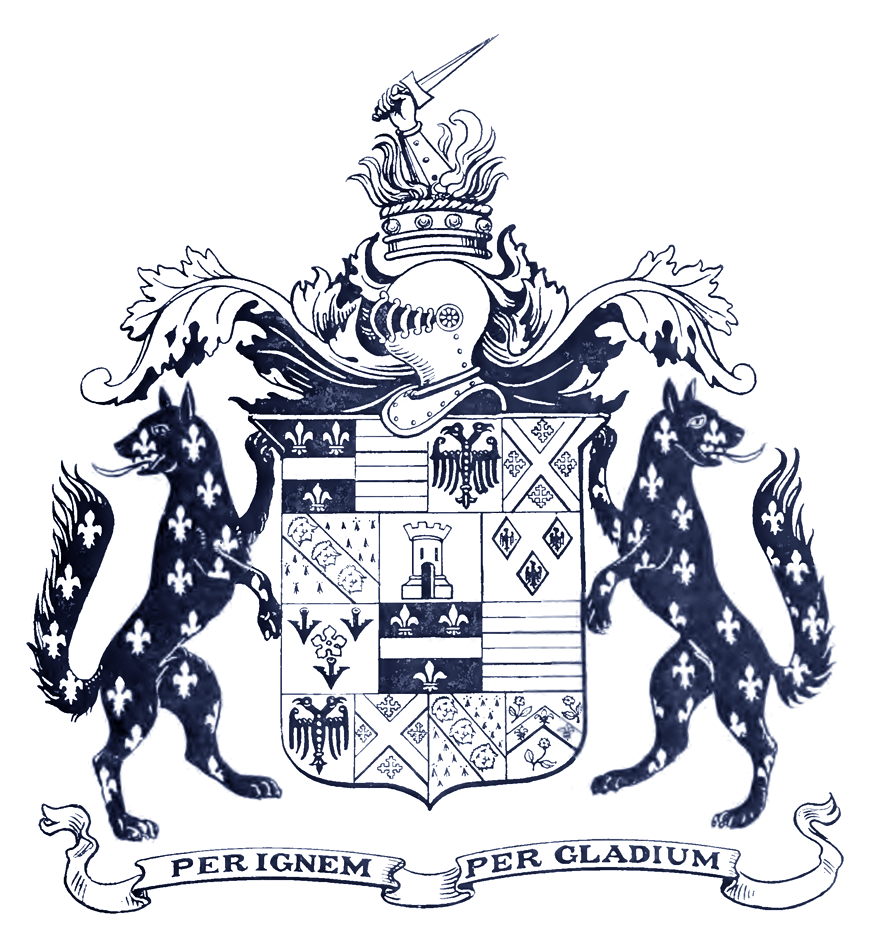
Heraldic atchievement of Reginald Lord Welby, G.C.B.

Welby held many posts during his tenure at the Treasury and was appointed Assistant Financial Secretary in 1880. In 1885, he succeeded Lord Lingen as Permanent Secretary to the Treasury, holding this office until his retirement in 1894. Following his retirement, he was raised to the peerage as Baron Welby, of Allington in the County of Lincoln, on 16 April 1894, although he did not play a great part in debates in the House of Lords. He was appointed a member of the Privy Council in 1913. Lord Welby also became an alderman of London County Council, eventually becoming its chairman, and served as President of the International Free Trade Congress.

== Personal life ==
Lord Welby was involved in a motorcar accident in December 1914, which he recovered from; however, his subsequent instability caused his death in the autumn of 1915. A bachelor, he left no heir and the barony expired on his death.

Government offices
Preceded by Sir Ralph Lingen	Permanent Secretary to the Treasury; 1885–1894 with Edward Walter Hamilton (1885–1894)	Succeeded by Sir Francis Mowatt
Political offices
Preceded by Thomas McKinnon Wood	Chairman of the London County Council; 1899 – 1900	Succeeded by Willoughby Dickinson
Preceded by Alfred Hoare	Chairman of the Finance Committee of London County Council; 1897–1899	Succeeded by William Wallace Bruce
Preceded by William Wallace Bruce	Chairman of the Finance Committee of London County Council; 1901–1907	Succeeded by Alfred Fowell Buxton
Peerage of the United Kingdom
New creation	Baron Welby; 1894–1915	Extinct
