= David Davies (dairyman) =

Welsh Conservative politician (1870–1958))

Sir David Davies (20 December 1870 – 25 April 1958) was a Welsh Conservative politician.

Davies was born in Tregaron, west Wales. His father, John Davies, was a smallholder living at Tynycae, a few miles outside the town in Ceredigion.

Like many of his contemporaries he left the Teifi Valley to work in the city as a deliverer of milk. His business was very successful, and he became the first leader of the London Retail Dairymen's Association. In 1897, he married Mary Ann, daughter of Abraham Edwards, Tymawr, Eglwysfach. The couple had one son and three daughters.

== Involvement in local government ==
He also immersed himself in local government, being elected as a Councillor on St Pancras Council (where he served alongside George Bernard Shaw) from 1900 to 1906, and then an Alderman from 1906 to 1945. In 1911–12, he was the mayor of the Borough of St Pancras. From 1912 to 1922 David Davies was a Councillor on the London County Council and an Alderman from 1922 to 1938.

== Allegiances ==
Though he came from a humble background, Davies served as chairman of the South East St Pancras Conservative Party from 1917 until 1944. He was knighted in 1938 and also served as a magistrate. He was elected a governor for life of the Royal Free Hospital.
