= John Maria Gatti =

Anglo-Swiss businessman and politician

Sir John Maria Emilio Gatti (13 August 1872 – 14 September 1929) was an Anglo-Swiss theatre manager, restaurateur and businessman who was also a prominent Conservative politician in London local government.

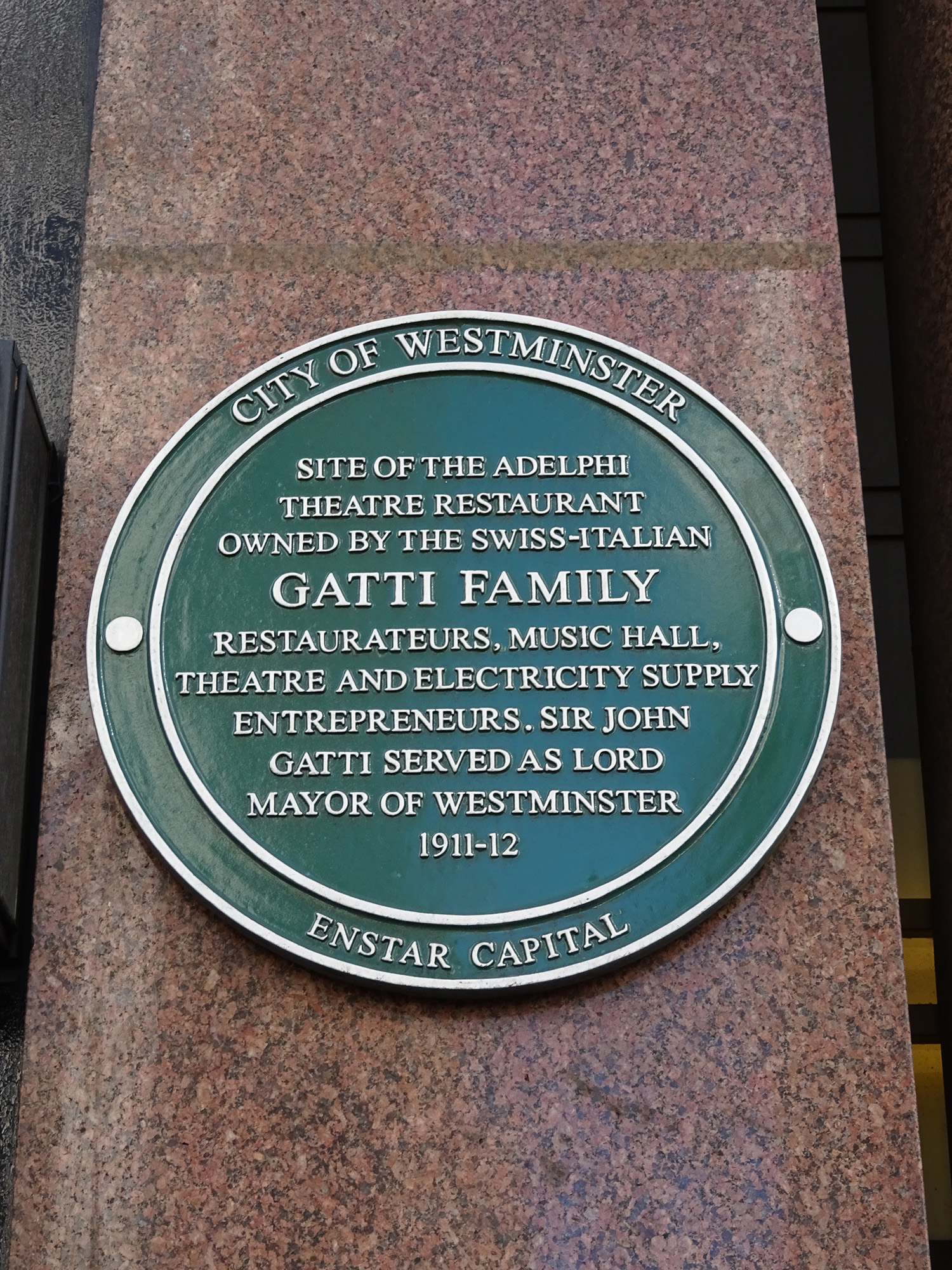
Green plaque marking the site of the Adelphi Theatre Restaurant owned by the Swiss-Italian Gatti family

Born as Giovanni Maria Emilio Gatti in Dongio, in the canton of Ticino, Switzerland, he was the eldest son of the entrepreneur Agostino Gatti. The Gatti family had built up a large family business in Westminster, including the Adelphi and Vaudeville Theatres, a string of cafe-restaurants and the Charing Cross and Strand Electricity Supply Corporation Ltd, which supplied power to most of the West End of London.

Gatti was educated at Stonyhurst College and St John's College, Oxford, before being called to the bar at the Inner Temple. He married Lily Mary Lloyd in 1897 and they had seven children. In the same year, his father died, and he took over the family businesses along with his younger brother Rocco Joseph Stefano Gatti.

His business interests, in particular the construction of electricity infrastructure, led him to become interested in the local government of the capital. In 1903 he was elected to Westminster City Council as a representative of the Charing Cross ward. He was a member of the Conservative-backed majority Moderate Party on the council, and was elected Mayor of Westminster for 1911–1912.

In 1908 he was a founding member of the Society of West End Theatre Managers. In 1919–1920 he was chairman of the society, and was involved in negotiating a standard theatrical contract for West End performers.

In 1918, Gatti was co-opted onto the London County Council as a Municipal Reform Party councillor for the Strand division. When elections resumed after World War I, he was elected a councillor for the Westminster Abbey division, holding the seat until his death. Gatti was short-listed to be Official Conservative candidate for the Westminster Abbey by-election in 1924, but lost out to Otho Nicholson who won the poll.

He served as chairman of the county council's finance committee for six years, and was chairman of the county council in 1927–1928. At the end of his term as chairman, he received a knighthood in the 1928 Birthday Honours.

Sir John Gatti died suddenly at Littleton Golf Club in September 1929, aged 57.

Political offices
Preceded by Sir George Hume	Chairman of the London County Council; 1927–1928	Succeeded by Cecil Levita
Preceded by Alfred Fowell Buxton	Chairman of the Finance Committee of London County Council; 1920–1927	Succeeded by Angus Scott
