= Robert Antrobus =

English cricketer, businessman, and politician

Personal information
- Full name: Robert Crawfurd Antrobus
- Born: 21 March 1830; London
- Died: 12 February 1911 (aged 80); London

Domestic team information
- Years: Team
- 1850: Gentlemen of England
- 1866: I Zingari
- FC debut: 15 August 1850 Gentlemen of England v Gentlemen of Kent
- Last FC: 8 August 1866 I Zingari v Gentlemen of the South

Career statistics
Competition	First-class
Matches	2
Runs scored	17
Batting average	5.66
100s/50s	0/0
Top score	12
Balls bowled	32
Wickets	2
Bowling average	10.00
5 wickets in innings	0
10 wickets in match	0
Best bowling	1/10
Catches/stumpings	0/–
- Source: CricketArchive, 11 October 2008

Robert Crawfurd Antrobus (21 March 1830 – 12 February 1911) was an English businessman, politician and first-class cricketer. He was born in London and died in Westminster.

Antrobus was the third son of Sir Edmund Antrobus, 2nd Baronet and Anne, daughter of Hugh Primrose Lindsay.

He was a prominent businessman in the City of London and held directorships in the Economic Life Assurance Company, the Bibi-Eybat Petroleum Company, the Schibaieff Petroleum Company and the Thames and Mersey Marine Insurance Company.

Antrobus made two first-class cricket appearances, sixteen years apart from each other. His first appearance came at the age of just 20 years old for Gentlemen of England, in 1850, batting in the tailend against Gentlemen of Kent. Antrobus hit his first-class best score of 12 in his debut innings, and 3 not out in the second innings of his debut. Moving slightly further up the order for his second and final first-class match, he played for I Zingari, against a team which included, amongst others, EM and WG Grace.

He married Emily Blackburne in 1873, with whom he had three children; Sybil Mary, Sir Phillip Humphrey, 6th Baronet, and Margaret Freda Evelyn.

In 1889 he was elected unopposed to the London County Council to represent St George Hanover Square. He was re-elected in 1892 and 1895. In 1898 he became an alderman, remaining on the council until 1904. He also held the position of Justice of the Peace in both London and Middlesex.
