= 1895 London County Council election =

Local election in England

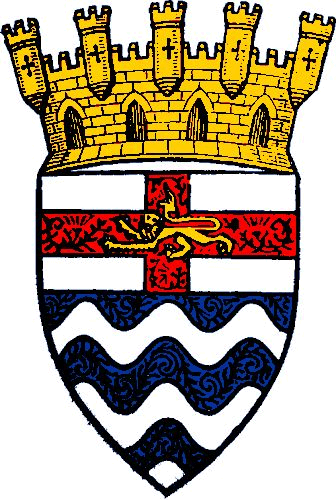
- 2 March 1895

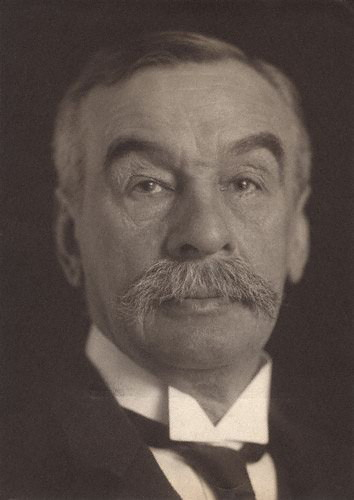
	First party	Second party
Leader	Charles Harrison	Charles Ritchie
Party	Progressive	Moderate
Leader's seat	Bethnal Green South West	None
Seats won	59	59
Seat change	▼23	▲23
Popular vote	134,663	140,310
Percentage	48.0%	50.0%

An election to the County Council of London took place on 2 March 1895. The council was elected by First Past the Post with each elector having two votes in the two-member seats. The Moderates made numerous gains, and tied the Progressive Party in seats on the council.

== Campaign ==
The Progressives campaigned on their record of running the council, arguing that they had achieved far more than the Metropolitan Board of Works had, and also that the various Metropolitan Borough Councils should be unified and their powers given to the London County Council. The Moderates argued that the Progressives had delayed in making improvements, and that measures should be taken to increase home ownership rates, rather than constructing council housing.

The Earl of Onslow, a prominent figure in the Conservative Party, was expected to stand for the Moderates in Islington South, but he was disqualified as his nomination papers were not received in time.

== Result ==
The Moderates gained 23 seats from the Progressives, and lost only one seat to them, tying both parties on 59 seats. Although the result was a tie, the Progressives held the majority of aldermanic seats on the council, and thus were able to retain control of it.

The Times argued that the result was worse for Progressives than initially appeared, as they had not only lost seats, but many of their formerly safe seats were now marginal. The Daily Chronicle argued that the poor result for the Progressives was due to apathy among workers, and that their vote had held steady among the middle class. In addition, it blamed the unsuccessful Independent Labour Party and Social Democratic Federation candidates for taking votes away from some Progressive candidates.

Party	Votes			Seats	
Party	Number	%	Stood	Seats	%
Progressive	134,663	48.0	110	59	50.0
Moderate	140,310	50.0	116	59	50.0
Social Democratic Federation			6	0	0.0
Ind. Labour Party			5	0	0.0
Independent			4	0	0.0
Independent Progressive			3	0	0.0
