= 1892 London County Council election =

Local election in England

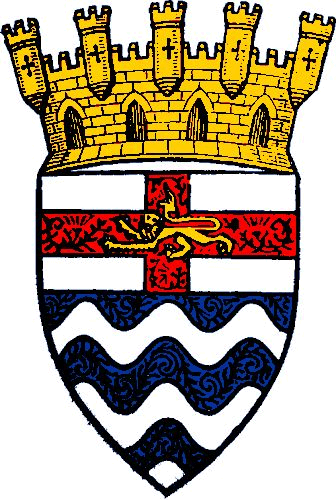
- 5 March 1892
	First party	Second party
Leader	James Stuart	None
Party	Progressive	Moderate
Leader's seat	Alderman	None
Seats won	83	35
Seat change	▲11	▼11
Popular vote	135,368	108,976

An election to the County Council of London took place on 5 March 1892. The council was elected by First Past the Post with each elector having two votes in the two-member seats. The Progressive Party retained control of the council, gaining seats from the Moderates.

== Campaign ==
The Progressives argued that a political party system was necessary on the council, and that the Conservative Party had attempted to discredit the party's leadership of the council, for the benefit of the opposition Moderates. The party called for the council to be given powers over the Metropolitan Police, and the city's water supply and tramways.

The Moderates did not conduct a centralised campaign, but the Conservative Party worked in support of the group. It argued that a formal party system would lead to corruption, and that the Progressives were at fault for developing one. It also campaigned against Irish home rule.

W. M. Thompson, one of the Progressive candidates in Strand was disqualified as he did not live in the division. Working as a barrister, he had supplied the address of his chambers on the nomination papers, but this was not deemed suitable qualification.

== Results ==
Although the previous election was not conducted on formal party lines, the elected members had either joined the Progressives or aligned with the Moderate group, so it was possible to track the changes to the council. The Progressives won 11 more seats than in 1889, at the expense of the Moderates. The Moderate gained a single seat, in Holborn.

The Manchester Guardian argued that the Progressives would be unable to carry out much of their programme, as it fell outside the council's remit; but that if the Liberal Party won the upcoming 1892 UK general election, it might be given responsibilities in these additional areas.

Party	Votes			Seats	
Party	Number	%	Stood	Seats	%
Progressive	135,368		93	83	
Moderate	108,976		109	35	
Labour Progressive			7	0	0.0
Ind. Labour Party			5	0	0.0
Independent			8	0	0.0
Independent Progressive			5	0	0.0
Independent Labour			5	0	0.0
Social Democratic Federation	1,076		3	0	0.0
Liberal Unionist			2	0	0.0
Independent Radical	1,060		1	0	0.0
Independent Moderate			1	0	0.0
Conservative			1	0	0.0
