= Shirenewton =

Village and community in Monmouthshire, Wales

Shirenewton: Welsh: Drenewydd Gelli-farch
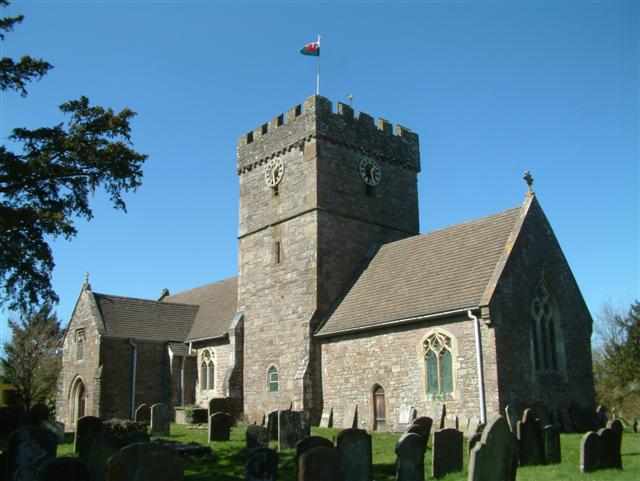
- Church of St. Thomas a Becket at Shirenewton

- Location within Monmouthshire
- Population: 1,145 (2011)
- OS grid reference: ST478936
- Community: Shirenewton
- Principal area: Monmouthshire
- Preserved county: Gwent
- Country: Wales
- Sovereign state: United Kingdom
- Post town: CHEPSTOW
- Postcode district: NP16
- Dialling code: 01291
- Police: Gwent
- Fire: South Wales
- Ambulance: Welsh
- UK Parliament: Monmouth
- Senedd Cymru – Welsh Parliament: Monmouth
- List of places UK Wales Monmouthshire 51.63877°N 2.75570°W Map of the community

Shirenewton (Welsh: Drenewydd Gelli-farch) is a village and community in Monmouthshire, south east Wales. It is located 3 miles due west of Chepstow, 5 miles (8 km) by road. The village stands around 500 feet (154 m) above sea level, and has extensive views of the Severn Estuary and Bristol Channel. The population of the village and the conjoined village of Mynydd-bach was 657 in 2011.

== Etymology ==
The 1901 Kelly's Directory, described the "Old Welsh name for the Parish" as "Tre-newydd-gelli-fach", and today the town's standardised Welsh Placename is Drenewydd Gelli-farch ("new town at the grove of the horse/stallion/steed"). The difference in the two names is purely grammatical, and is a common feature of Welsh morphology. As such, the name "Trenewydd Gelli Farch" appears on roadsigns leading into Shirenewton.

The name of Mynydd-bâch, the contiguous village north-east of Shirenewton, means "Little Mountain" in Welsh.

== History ==
Before the Norman invasion of Wales, the Shirenewton area formed part of the forest of Wentwood (Welsh: Coed Gwent). At the time of the Domesday Book, it was part of the lands at Caldicot which were held by Durand, the Sheriff of Gloucester. Durand and his successor as sheriff, his nephew Walter FitzRoger also known as Walter de Gloucester, had part of the forest cleared around the year 1100, and established a small settlement which was known as "Sheriff's Newton (or New Town)" or, in Latin, Nova Villa. The manor then became known as Caldecot-cum-Newton, and in some documents the village was called Newton Netherwent. "Netherwent" is the English name given to the Welsh cantref of Gwent-is-coed (Gwent beneath the wood, i.e. Wentwood), with "-went" deriving from Venta, a Brythonic word found in the Latin name, Venta Silurum (modern Caerwent). The name "Sheriff's Newton" became contracted over the years into Shirenewton.

After Walter retired to become a monk at Llanthony Priory, he was followed as Sheriff by his son, Milo Fitzwalter (Miles de Gloucester), who became Earl of Hereford and Lord High Constable of England in 1141. The area north west of the village became known as the Earl's Wood about that time, hence modern Earlswood.

The Mounton Brook runs through the parish, and in the eighteenth and nineteenth centuries provided the water power to operate five paper mills in the Mynydd-bach area - White Mill, Itton Mill, Dyer's Mill, Itton Court Mill, and Pandy Mill. These made brown and blue packing paper, using rags, straw and old rope as raw materials. There were three more mills just downstream at Mounton.

=== Shirenewton Hall ===
The Grade II listed building Shirenewton Hall, once the residence of botanist and meteorologist Edward Joseph Lowe, is a large residence at the top of the hill, commanding extensive views of the Severn Estuary and beyond. The Hall was built on the site of an earlier Tudor mansion in the early 1800s, and extended in 1910 by Charles Oswald Liddell, who created the oriental gardens.

In 1988 the house was the setting for the film The Woman He Loved, the story of Edward VIII's abdication. Just behind the hall there was formerly an ancient mansion, belonging to the Blethyn family, and said to have been once occupied by Bishop Blethyn, who died there in 1590.

=== Parish church ===
The Church of St. Thomas à Becket was built by Humphrey de Bohun. Much of the current church, such as the fortified tower, choir, chancel and nave, date from the 13th century, although it was rebuilt and restored in 1853.

A monument to Ian Oswald Liddell, who won a Victoria Cross during the Second World War is located at the church. He was the grandson of Sir Charles Oswald Liddell of Shirenewton Hall. According to the London Gazette:

"In Germany on April 3rd, 1945, Captain Liddell was commanding a company of the Coldstream Guards ordered to capture intact a bridge over the river Ems, near Lingen, Germany. The bridge was heavily defended and prepared for demolition. Captain Liddell ran forward alone, scaling a 10ft. high road block, to neutralise the 500 lb. charges. Unprotected, and all the time under intense fire, he crossed and re-crossed the whole length of the bridge, disconnecting the charges at both ends and underneath it. His task completed, he climbed on the road block and signalled to the leading platoon that the way was clear for the advance across the river.The bridge was captured intact, and the way cleared for the advance over the river. Captain Liddell's outstanding gallantry and superb example of courage will never be forgotten by those who saw it. This very brave officer later died of wounds subsequently received in action."

The former rectory Cae-Pw-Cella on Red House Lane is a Grade II listed Tudor Revival Villa dating from 1840.

== Governance ==
An electoral ward in the same name exists. This ward also includes Mathern. The total ward population taken at the 2011 census was 2,201.

== The village today ==
The 1892 Chepstow Directory has an entry for Shirenewton, showing that it had a population of around 650 people at that time. The current population is unknown, but the number of houses in the village has increased markedly in recent years. Many attempts have been made to extend the village, to add small housing estates, but most have been denied planning permission due to the village boundaries, and the desire of the locals to keep the village as it is.

Shirenewton, although relatively small, has three pubs: The Carpenters Arms, The Tredegar Arms and The Huntsman Hotel. A fourth, The Tan House, closed in Summer 2011 and was empty till being sold in June 2012. The future use of the premises is at the time of writing, not known. Until recently it sported a small village shop (SPAR) which closed in January 2007 and is currently for sale. This took the place of the original 5 Bells shop which shut in the early 1990s, and Ostlers Garage and Shop which closed in the late 1990s. Shirenewton also had a small village Post Office, but this closed several years ago.

The village also has a modern primary school called Shirenewton Primary that was built in 1985. This lies between Shirenewton and Mynydd-bach, and is situated in large open playing fields. The school hosts seven classes, three infant classes, and four junior.

Shirenewton's large golf course closed in May 2005 and the site has since been developed for luxury housing, although part of the golf course has been kept as a conservation area. The golf course encompassed the site of the abandoned manor of Dinham, which also included a small castle, now left in unrecognisable ruins.

"The Grondra", also located in the village, is considered to be one of the finest 18th century country houses in Monmouthshire. The owner was recently fined £40,000, however, after major structural changes were carried out without local authority consent. It is estimated that remedial work, to return the Grade II listed building to its former condition, will cost more than £450,000.

The village of Shirenewton has easy links to the M48 motorway at Chepstow, making access to Bristol, Newport and Cardiff quick and easy.
