= Murray Adams-Acton =

English historian

Gladstone Murray Adams-Acton (known as Murray Adams-Acton) (1886–1971) was an English historian of art and architecture and interior designer of considerable flamboyance.

Adams-Acton was the son of the sculptor John Adams-Acton and his wife Marion (née Hamilton), better known as the writer Jeanie Hering.

He designed the dining room to Shirenewton Hall in 1910 and the interiors of a men's outfitter's shop, Swan & Edgar's in Piccadilly, renovating it before it reopened in 1927. Book Review Digest described him in 1930 as a "charming draftsman". He was also adept as a furniture designer and inventor, and made numerous items including a toaster. As an expert, he also authored numerous publications on design, such as Domestic Architecture and Old Furniture and The Genesis and Development of Linenfold Panelling (1945). He also produced work about ecclesiastical architecture in France. Adams-Acton was also a keen gardener, noted in particular for his rhododendron cultivation in the 1940s.
