= Norman Evill =

English architect and draughtsman (1873–1958)

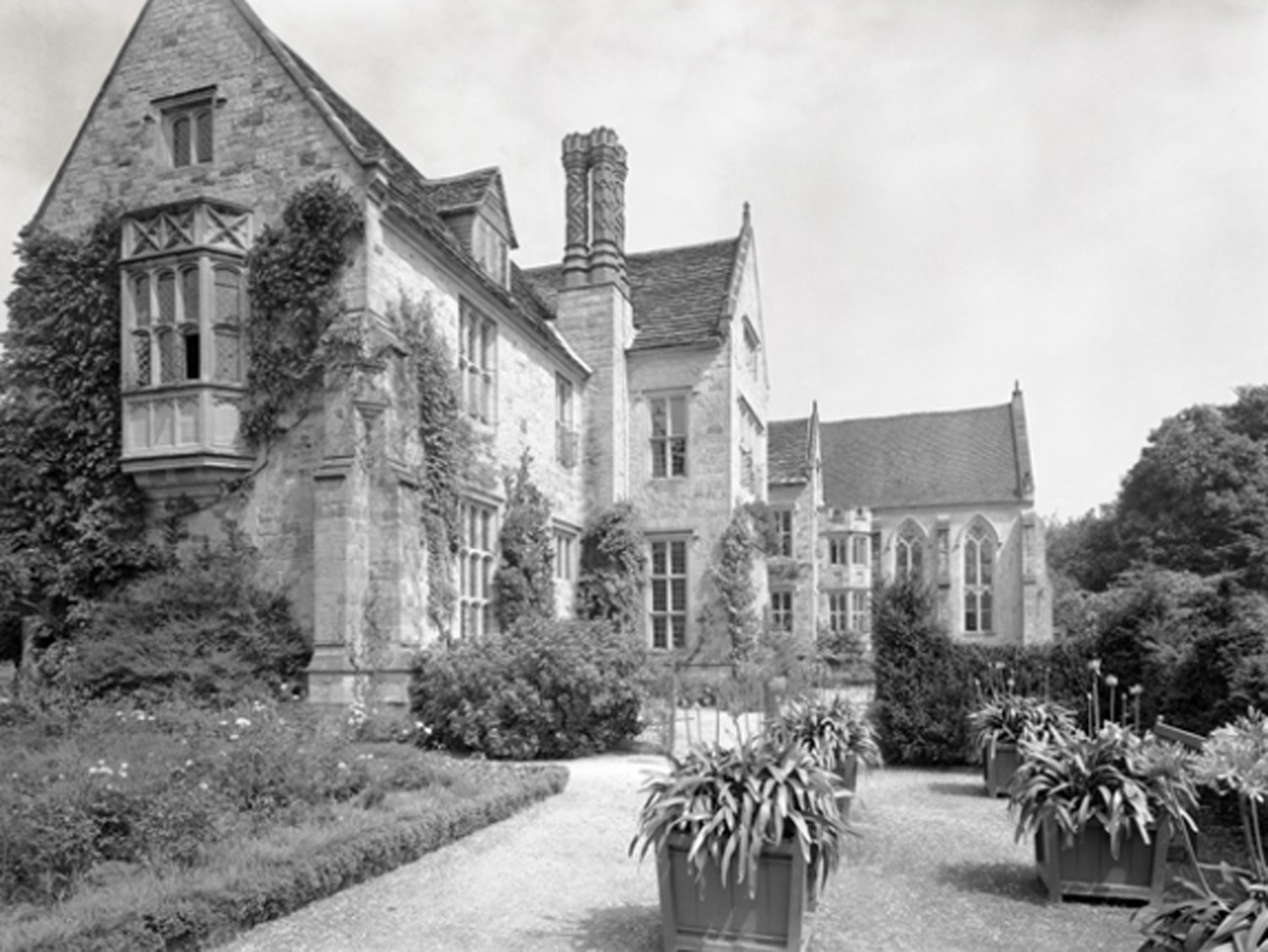
- Nymans, West Sussex, a country house rebuilt by Evill and Walter Tapper
- Born: 1873
- Died: 5 August 1958 (aged 84-85)
- Occupation: Architect
- Parent: Walter Evill
- Buildings: Nymans; Shirenewton Hall

Norman Adolphus Evill FRIBA (1873 – 5 August 1958) was an English architect and draughtsman, apprenticed to Edwin Lutyens.

== Life and works ==
Evill was born in the village of Hewelsfield, Gloucestershire, in 1873. (Note: He was baptised at Hewelsfield on 12 October 1873. Some sources incorrectly give his year of birth as 1874.) His father, Walter, was also an architect, who undertook much work in the nearby town of Chepstow. Evill was apprenticed to Edwin Lutyens as a draughtsman in 1899, later recording that he observed, and tried to learn, Lutyens' ability to see "in the round". Evill worked at Lutyens' office in Bloomsbury Square for three years.

Establishing his own architectural and drawing practice in the early twentieth century, Evill undertook a range of work, often restorations and re-buildings, rather than entirely new works. These include the re-building and extension of Nymans Manor in West Sussex, although Evill was replaced by Walter Tapper after a disagreement with the owner, Leonard Messel. Clive Aslet, the architectural writer, describes the combined result as "a Victorian house transformed into a medieval romance". (Note: Christopher Hussey contributed to the fantasy by writing a spoof article on the transformed house for Country Life.) Evill also built a row of cottages on the Nymans estate. Other works in the South of England included a garden house, and internal refurbishment, at Bratton, Wiltshire, and classrooms and a chapel at Ashdown House School, East Sussex, where his cousin was headmaster. For the inhabitants of the Hampshire village of Silchester, he designed a village hall which was redeveloped in the early 21st century. He undertook other work in Silchester, including large extensions to Silchester House, and two smaller houses, the Grange and High Timbers, now Romans Hotel. Bullen, Crook, Hubbuck and Pevsner, in their Hampshire: Winchester and the North volume of the Buildings of England series, describe Romans as being "in his master's Surrey style". In London, Evill restored Park House at Hampton Court Palace, (Note: Park House was the home of W. E. Johns, the author of the Biggles stories, from 1953 until his death in 1968.) and undertook the conversion of a coach house in the garden of his own home on Church Row, Hampstead. Renamed 24 Perrins Walk, the coach house later became the home of the comedian Peter Cook.

Work in the West and Wales included the reconstruction of Shirenewton Hall in Monmouthshire, and a house, Ivy Rock, at Tidenham, Gloucestershire. In the North, Nevill built Barn Close, Carlisle for the architect and industrialist Edwin Scott-Nicholson. Hyde and Pevsner, in their Cumbria volume of the Buildings of England, note the Arts and Crafts design of the house, a style that Evill favoured.

Evill died in 1958.

== Sources ==
- Aslet, Clive (1982). The Last Country Houses. New Haven and London: Yale University Press. ISBN 0-300-02904-7.
- Bullen, Michael; Crook, John; Hubbuck, Rodney; Pevsner, Nikolaus (2010). Hampshire: Winchester and the North. The Buildings of England. Yale University Press. ISBN 978-0-300-12084-4. OCLC 1023298301.
- Fazio, Michael; Snadon, Patrick Alexander (2006). The Domestic Architecture of Benjamin Henry Latrobe. Baltimore: Johns Hopkins University Press. ISBN 9780801881046.
- Hussey, Christopher (1989) [1950]. The Life of Sir Edwin Lutyens. Woodbridge: Antique Collectors Club. ISBN 978-0-907462-59-0.
- Hyde, Matthew; Pevsner, Nikolaus (2010). Cumbria: Cumberland, Westmorland and Furness. The Buildings of England. Yale University Press. ISBN 978-0-300-12663-1. OCLC 846117723.
- Newman, John (2000). Gwent/Monmouthshire. The Buildings of Wales. London: Penguin. ISBN 0-14-071053-1.
- Verey, David; Brooks, Alan (2002) [1970]. Gloucestershire 2: The Vale and the Forest of Dean. The Buildings of England. Yale University Press. ISBN 0-300-09733-6.
