= Marion Hamilton =

Marion Hamilton may refer to:

- Marion Adams-Acton (1846–1928), maiden name Hamilton, Scottish novelist
- Letitia Marion Hamilton (1878–1964), Irish artist
