= Church of St Thomas a Becket, Shirenewton =

Church in Monmouthshire, Wales

Coordinates: 51.6379°N 2.7535°W

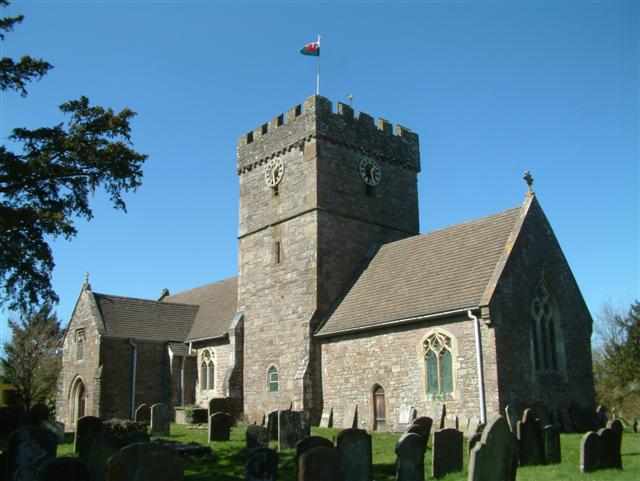
Shirenewton Church

The Church of St Thomas a Becket is located in Shirenewton, Monmouthshire, Wales. In the late 12th century the land was inherited by Henry de Bohun. The church was built by his son Humphrey after he inherited the title in 1220, and was dedicated to St. Thomas à Becket who had been assassinated in 1170 and canonised three years later. The chronicler Adam of Usk, who held the post in 1399, was one of the earliest known rectors of the church. The church was designated a Grade II listed building on 19 August 1955. Services are normally held at 9:45am on Sundays.

== Architecture and fittings ==
Much of the current church, including the fortified tower, choir, chancel and nave, originally dates from the 13th century, although it was partly rebuilt and completely restored in 1853. The church contains a monument to Ian Oswald Liddell, who won a Victoria Cross during the Second World War. He was the grandson of Sir Charles Oswald Liddell of Shirenewton Hall. The four-faced clock was installed after the First World War. A Millennium Grant has helped pay for floodlighting of the church.
