= Horace James Seymour =

British diplomat (1885–1978)

- Born: 26 February 1885
- Died: 10 September 1978 (aged 93)
- Spouse: Violet Erskine (m. 1917)
- Children: 4

Sir Horace James Seymour GCMG CVO (26 February 1885 – 10 September 1978) was a British diplomat who served in Washington, D.C., Tehran, the Hague, Rome, and Chongqing. He was Principal Private Secretary to the British Foreign Secretary and Assistant Under-Secretary of State at the Foreign Office. His most senior appointment was as British Ambassador to China from 1942 to 1946.

== Early life and family ==
The elder son of Hugh Francis Seymour and Rachel Blanche Lascelles, and the great-grandson of Col. Hugh Henry John Seymour, a grandson of Francis Seymour-Conway, 1st Marquess of Hertford, and a descendant of Edward Seymour, 1st Duke of Somerset, Seymour was educated at Eton and Trinity College, Cambridge.

== Career ==
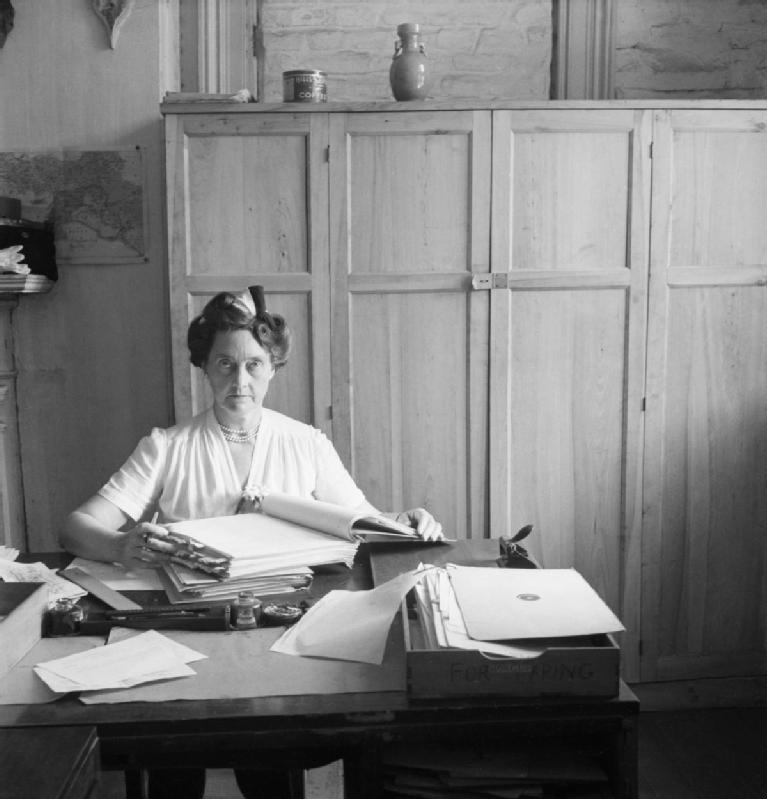
Lady Seymour at work in the Chongqing embassy, c.1939–1945, by Cecil Beaton

Seymour entered the Foreign Office and Diplomatic Service in 1908. He was Second Secretary at the British Embassy to the United States in 1919, First Secretary in the Netherlands in 1923 and in Italy in 1925, then from 1932 to 1936 Principal Private Secretary to the Foreign Secretary. He was next British Minister ('Envoy Extraordinary and Minister Plenipotentiary') in Tehran, from 1936 to 1939, Assistant Under-Secretary of State at the Foreign Office, 1939 to 1942, and then Ambassador to China, from 1942 to 1946. He retired in 1947.

On 8 May 1944, Seymour presented the insignia of a Knight Commander of the Bath to He Yingqin, Chinese Minister of War and Chief of the General Staff, in Chongqing.

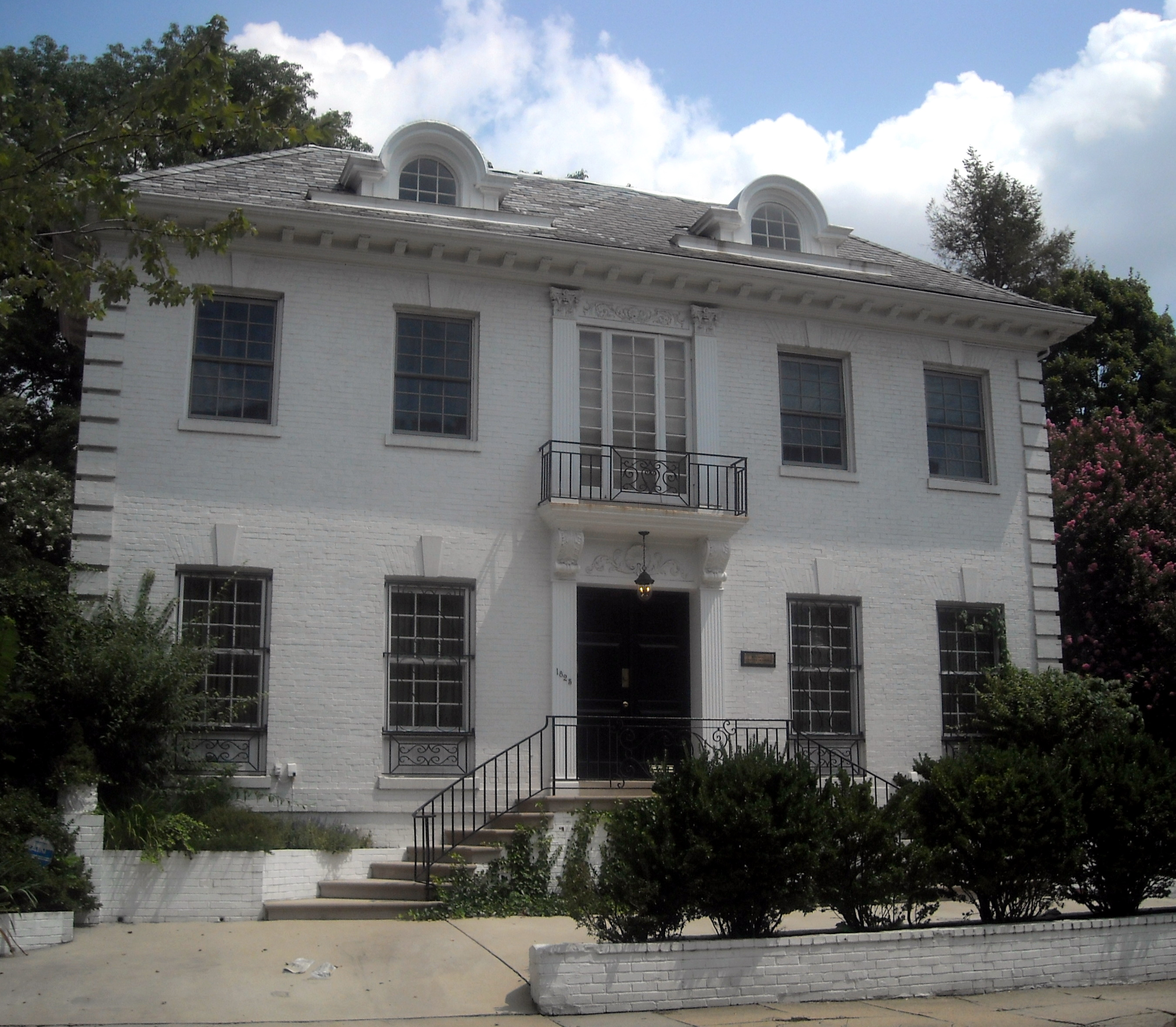
Seymour's house, Washington

Between April 1947 and July 1947, Seymour was a member of the Franco-Siamese Boundary Commission sitting in Washington, D.C., and in December 1947 he was appointed as chairman of the British Delegation to the Balkans Commission, based at Salonika, Greece.

== Marriage and children ==
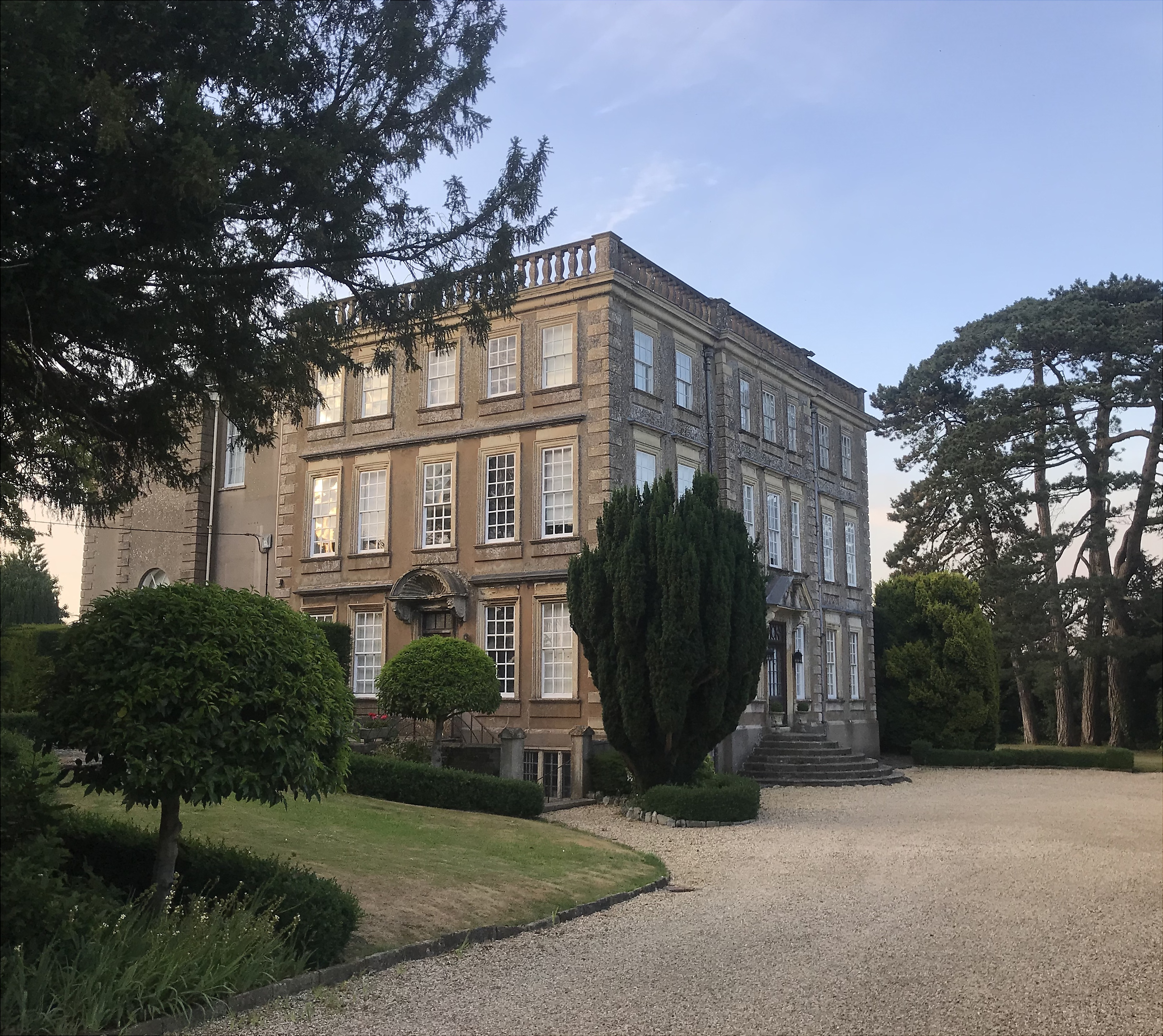
Bratton House, Wiltshire

In 1917, Horace James Seymour married Violet, a daughter of Thomas Edward Erskine, and they had three daughters, Jane (who died in infancy), Joan, and Virginia, and one son, Hugh Francis Seymour (1926—2010). They lived at Bratton House, near Westbury in Wiltshire.

== Honours ==
- Companion of the Order of St Michael and St George, 1927
- Commander of the Royal Victorian Order, 1936
- Knight Commander of the Order of St Michael and St George, 1939
- Knight Grand Cross of the Order of St Michael and St George, 1946

Diplomatic posts
Preceded by Sir Walford Selby	Principal Private Secretary to the Foreign Secretary; 1932-1935	Succeeded by Oliver, The Lord Harvey of Tasburgh
Preceded by Hughe Knatchbull-Hugessen	British Ambassador to Iran; 1936–1939	Succeeded by Reader Bullard
Preceded by Archibald Clark Kerr, 1st Baron Inverchapel	British Ambassador to China; 1942–1946	Succeeded by Sir Ralph Clarmont Skrine Stevenson
