= Statue of John Wesley, Shoreditch =

Statue in London, United Kingdom

Statue of John Wesley
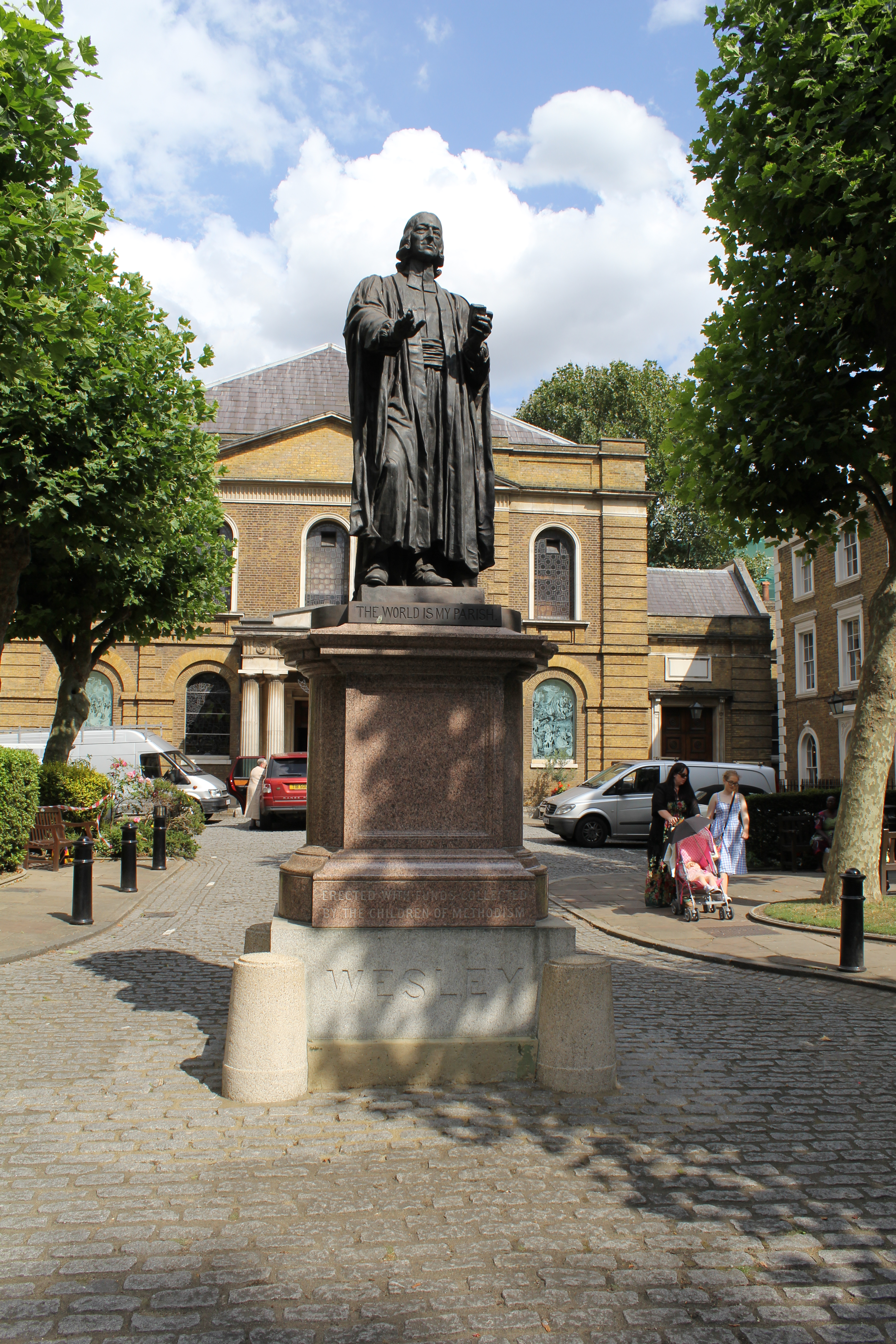
- The statue in front of Wesley's Chapel in 2010
- Artist: J. Adams Acton
- Subject: John Wesley
- Location: London, United Kingdom; 51°31′25″N 0°05′14″W

A statue of John Wesley, an Anglican minister and theologian, by British sculptor John Adams-Acton is installed outside Wesley's Chapel, along City Road, in Shoreditch, London, United Kingdom. The statue, created in 1891, is Grade II-listed. The 10 foot high granite pedestal on which the statue is located was the work of the Methodist architect Elijah Hoole.

== See also ==
- List of public art in Islington
