= Mynydd-bach, Monmouthshire =

Hamlet in Monmouthshire, Wales

Coordinates: 51.64479°N 2.74979°W

Mynydd-bach
- Hamlet
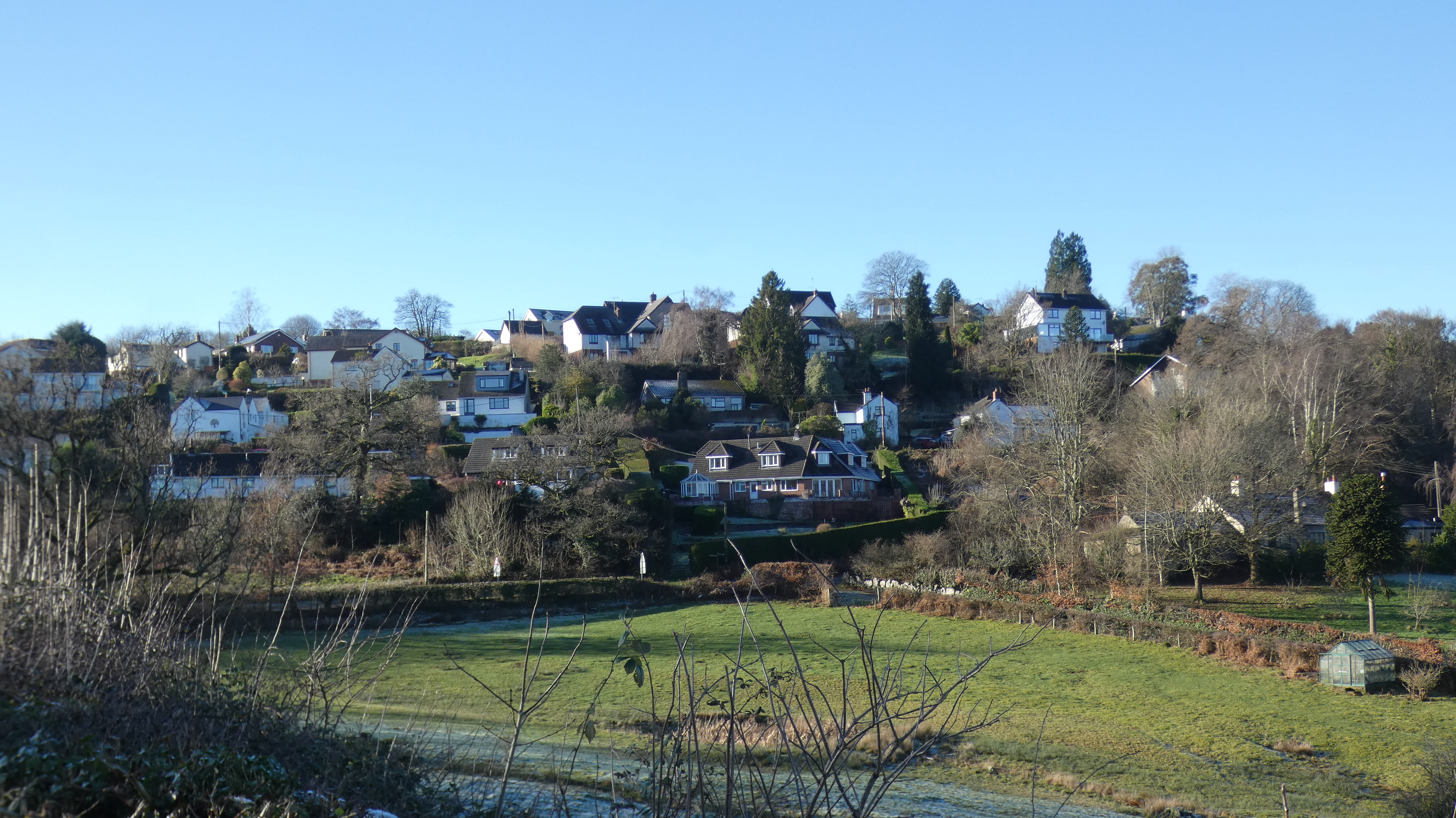
- Mynydd-bach from Usk Road.

- Location within Monmouthshire
- Community: Shirenewton
- Principal area: Monmouthshire
- Country: Wales
- Sovereign state: United Kingdom
- Police: Gwent
- Fire: South Wales
- Ambulance: Welsh
- UK Parliament: Monmouthshire

Mynydd-bach (Welsh for 'little mountain'; historically spelled Mynydd-bâch) (Note: also spelled today as Mynyddbach, Mynydd-bach or Mynydd Bach) is a hamlet in Monmouthshire, Wales. It is part of the community of Shirenewton, which shares its name with the village located to the south of Mynydd-bach. It shares much of its history and facilities with Shirenewton and was part of the parish of the same name.

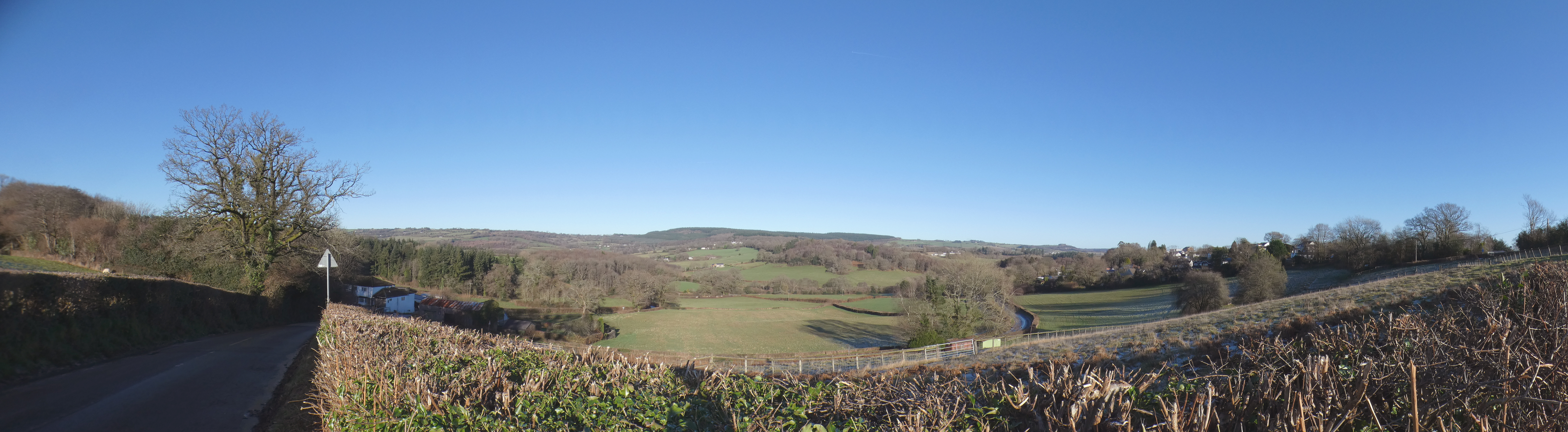
Panorama, centred on Itton, with Mynydd-bach at right and Whitemill Common and Roughets Wood centre left.

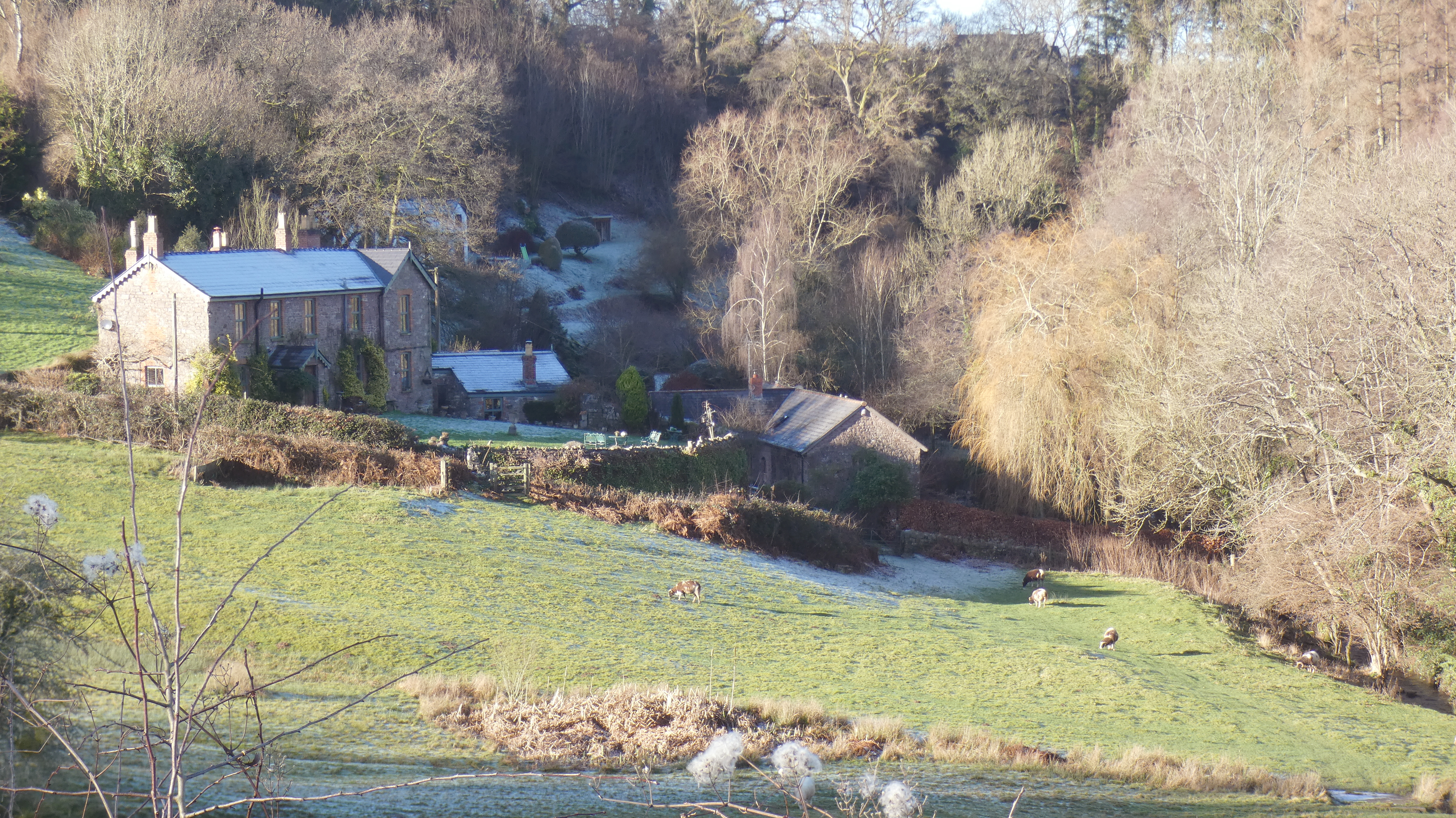
The old Tuckmill Cottage with the remains of the tucking mill further down in the trees by Mounton Brook.

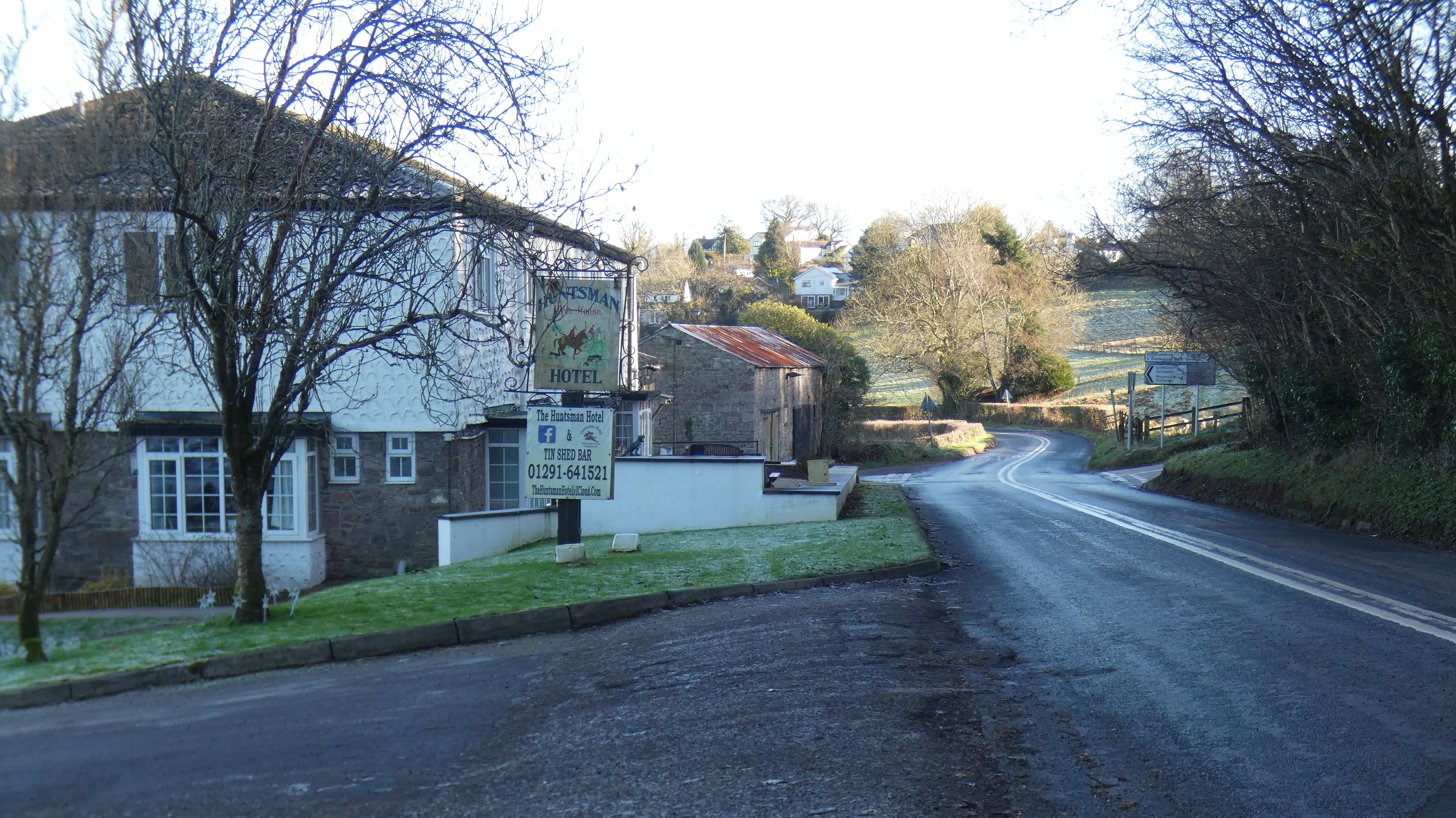
The Huntsman Hotel, historically the Cross Hands Inn, by the Usk Road.

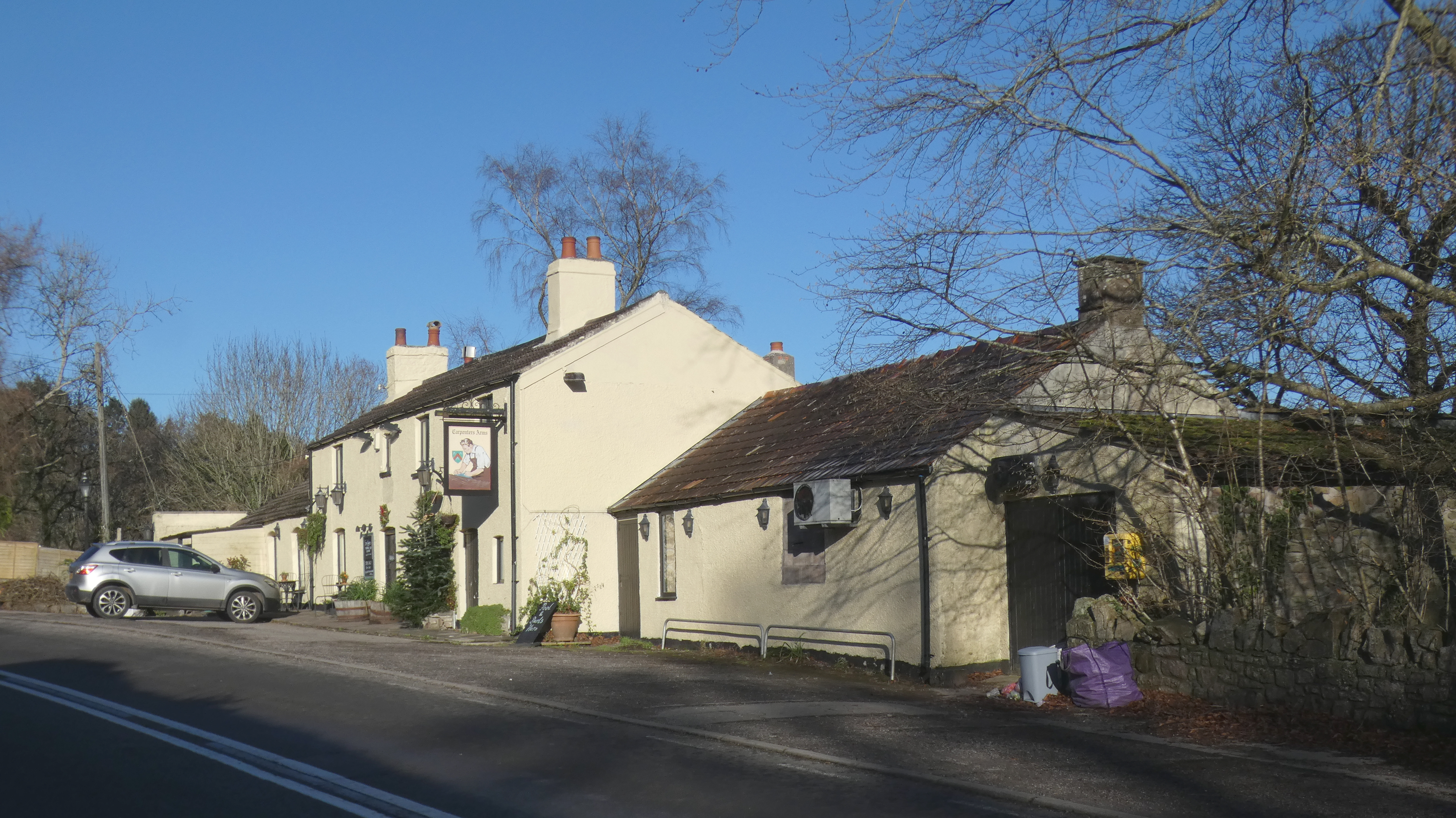
The Carpenter's Arms, a historical pub and boarding house, by the Usk Road.

== Geography ==
The northwestern part of Mynydd-bach is underlain by Brownstones formation sandstone formed between 419.2 and 393.3 million years ago (mya) in the Devonian period. This is surrounded by a margin of between 40 and 100 metres width of inter-bedded Devonian quartz and sandstone conglomerate formed between 372.2 and 358.9 mya, running roughly under most of Shirenewton Primary School and along the southern part of the road, continuing under the Carpenter's Arms public house before turning north. To the south and east of these areas the bedrock is Tintern sandstone of the Devonian and Carboniferous periods, from between 372.2 and 346.7 mya. Further south and east are margins of limestone and mudstone. Elevations range from 65 metres in the east towards Pandy Mill and 150 metres in the west at Ross's Wood and Coed Llywyn-y-celin and south in Shirenewton. Tributaries leading to Mounton Brook, which passes immediately north of the hamlet, have their sources in the sandstone hills to the northwest, the course descending over 2 kilometres from the hamlet to St. Pierre Pill at the River Severn.

== Natural history ==
The part of the hamlet area east of the Huntsman's Hotel and north of the Usk Road (B4235) is included in the Wye Valley National Landscape, an Area of Outstanding Natural Beauty. The whole area is classed as a Special Landscape Area. It includes Whitemill Common and Roughets Wood which are separated by Mounton Brook; they had been planted with spruce, larch and poplar from the mid-20th century. As part of continuing environmental improvement plans, many conifers were removed from 1995 and replaced with broadleaved species. Poplars were removed from the inventoried ancient woodland of the lower valley of Roughets Wood in 1999 (part of Whitemill Common by Mounton Brook is also in the inventory) and non-native or invasive species such as cherry laurel and Himalayan balsam cleared or managed. The riverside environment is now native again and semi-natural, containing species associated with ancient woodlands, including wood-sorrel, bluebells, primroses and pendulous sedge.

There are two local Sites of Special Scientific Interest: the Llywyn-y-celin wetland bordering Mounton Brook, to the west of Roughets Wood, has a spring mire and swamp plant environment that is rare in southeast Wales; Mwyngloddfa Mynydd-bach is a hibernaculum for lesser horseshoe bats in an old mine adit in the sandstone hillside.

== History ==
Mynydd-bach and Shirenewton are separated by a few fields; much of their recorded history is described in the same documents. Mounton Brook, had a number of mills along its course past the hamlet which had fallen into disuse by the middle part of the 19th century, the end of what was a local paper making industry - Little Mill, Whitemill, Tuckmill, Dyer's Mill, Itton Court Mill and Pandy Mill. Whitemill had been a corn mill, previously called Curbehinde and Goodbehind Mill, which had existed since the 1500s before conversion to a paper mill for white paper - possibly hence the name change - c.1730. It ceased operation by 1849. Tuck Mill was a fulling mill [tucking is a synonym of fulling]; it was mentioned in a lease from 1587. By the late 1870s it was ruined but is now a private dwelling. Dyer's mill, recorded from at least 1700 for dyeing, run by William Ffoord, was also a paper mill by the early 19th century. Pandy Mill also records William Ffoord as its occupier until 1707. It was also known as Brown Paper Mill by 1830 due to its output. Paper-making stopped there in 1839 but it remained operational until the late 19th century. It was run, like other mills along the valley, for some years by the Hollis family. A scion, William Hollis, was sheriff of Monmouthshire in 1831. He rebuilt Shirenewton court in 1830 (later renamed Shirenewton Hall by Edward Joseph Lowe. John Reece, a millwright of the Reece family which worked at different mills on the Brook, was murdered on 30 July 1835 by the road from Chepstow with his skull smashed open. The accused, haulier Edward Morgan, was found not guilty.

A grant was provided for Mynydd-bach School to be built to educate the poor on what is now Old School Hill. In 1914, the school (a primary) had 75 pupils; they went to the nearest secondary school at Lydney. It closed in 1985 when Shirenewton Primary School was built in the west of Mynydd-bach. Before mains water was connected between 1953 and 1955, there was a public tap in addition to wells around the hamlet. Spout Hill, which runs between Shirenewton and the hamlet, was so named because of The Spout, which appears on 19th-century maps as 'Holy Well'.

The Cross Hands Inn operated from at least 1830s, where it served the community for a variety of purposes. The prize-fighter, Bill Benjamin, was its most famous landlord; he lost to the English champion, Tom Sayers, in three rounds in 1858. Later the inn became the Huntsmann Inn and is now the Huntsman Hotel.

The Carpenter's Arms inn was licensed in 1860, also serving the community for meetings and auctions etc. There was a serious fire in 1880. In the late 19th century and into the 20th, the inn's landlords were fined, sometimes heavily, with ensuing bankruptcy, after serving drinks without a licence and for drinks being served outside licensing hours. Police had hidden to watch ingress. Customers were also fined. In 1918, the landlord was fined for failing to keep a lodging-house register. In March 1978, it won the 'Best Revived Pub' award in Egon Ronay's guide to British Pubs. A ghost tale was reported of a young girl murdered by her father and buried in the pub walls.

== Modern hamlet ==
Most modern housing development has been at Mynydd-bach rather than Shirenewton. Shirenewton Primary School is located in Mynydd-bach at its western edge on Old School Hill off Ditch Hill Lane, with about 200 pupils on roll; it has a very large rural catchment area. The Carpenter's Arms and The Hunstman Hotel (formerly The Huntsman Inn and historically the aforementioned Cross Hands Inn) continue to serve the local community.

== Local government ==
It is part of the community of Shirenewton, governed by Shirenewton Community Council, as part of the community ward of Shirenewton and Mynyddbach.

For Monmouthshire County Council, Mynydd-bach is in the electoral ward of Shirenewton, and the Devauden area committee. For secondary education, it is within the Chepstow School catchment area. The only bus route is along Spout Hill and the B4235. The nearest fire station and community hospital are at Chepstow; there are defibrillators at the school and Yr Hen Stordy on Old School Hill, at the Huntsman Hotel and at the Carpenter's Arms.

The member of parliament for the area is Catherine Fookes of the Labour Party, representing the Monmouthshire constituency as of 2024.
