= David Liddell =

British Army officer and businessman

See Charles David Liddell and David Liddell-Grainger for similarly named individuals.

Major David Liddell, MC (9 January 1917 in Hankou, China – 20 March 2008) was a Scottish soldier, insurance broker and farmer.

A British Army World War II commander awarded an immediate MC for his outstanding service in Italy while serving with the 12th Battalion Cameronians (Scottish Rifles). On 23 December 1943, he commanded the reinforcements to the Essex 5th Battalion Regiment, which was sent to capture the Italian village of Villa Grande, near Termoli, which was being held by the German 1st Parachute Division.

Liddell's company attacked at first light. His men gained a foothold in the village, but the platoons became separated by 100 yards of bullet-swept ground. The leading platoon had suffered severe casualties, and when Liddell came up with reinforcements they were pinned down by heavy machine-gun fire. Liddell charged the machine-gun post single-handed, knocked it out with hand grenades and enabled his men to continue the advance. During the engagement his batman was killed beside him and he himself was wounded in the eye. He continued, nevertheless, until he had linked up with the isolated platoon. Wearing gym shoes in order not to be overheard by the Germans in the next building, Liddell reported to his CO and refused to be evacuated until his men were in good defensive positions and had been fed.

While training he was called to assist with the capture of Rudolf Hess who had landed nearby.

== Family ==
His wife was Joan Russell, who represented England at squash. She predeceased him, dying in 2004. Liddell was survived by two sons and a daughter. His brother was Ian Oswald Liddell VC.
