= Bratton House =

Country house in Bratton, Wiltshire, England

Coordinates: 51.2717°N 2.1215°W

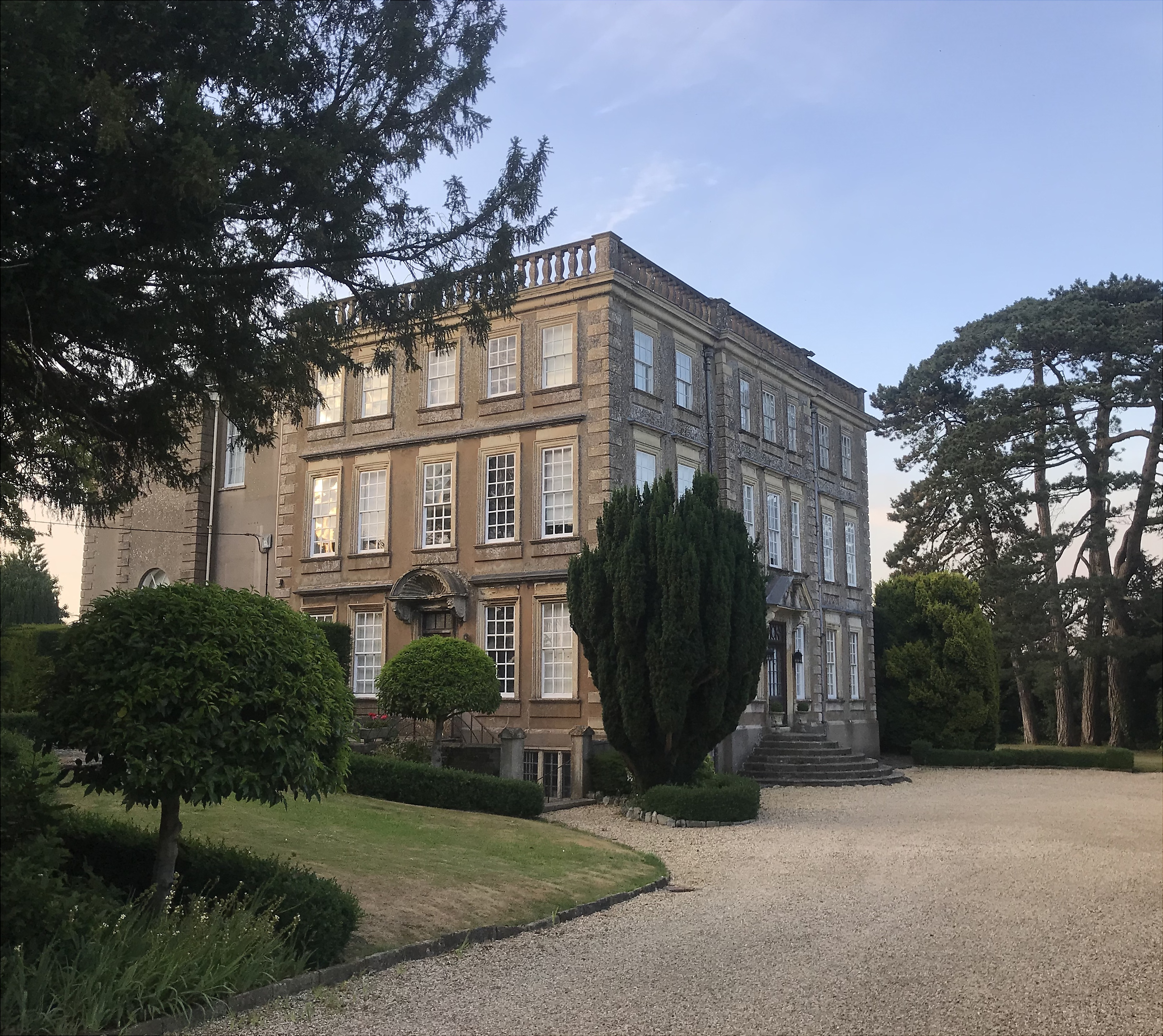
Bratton House in July 2018

Bratton House is a grade II* listed country house in Melbourne Street, Bratton, Wiltshire, England. The house dates from 1715 and was built for Philip Ballard. It was enlarged in 1826 for the Seagram family with additional alterations in 1915 and the 1930s.

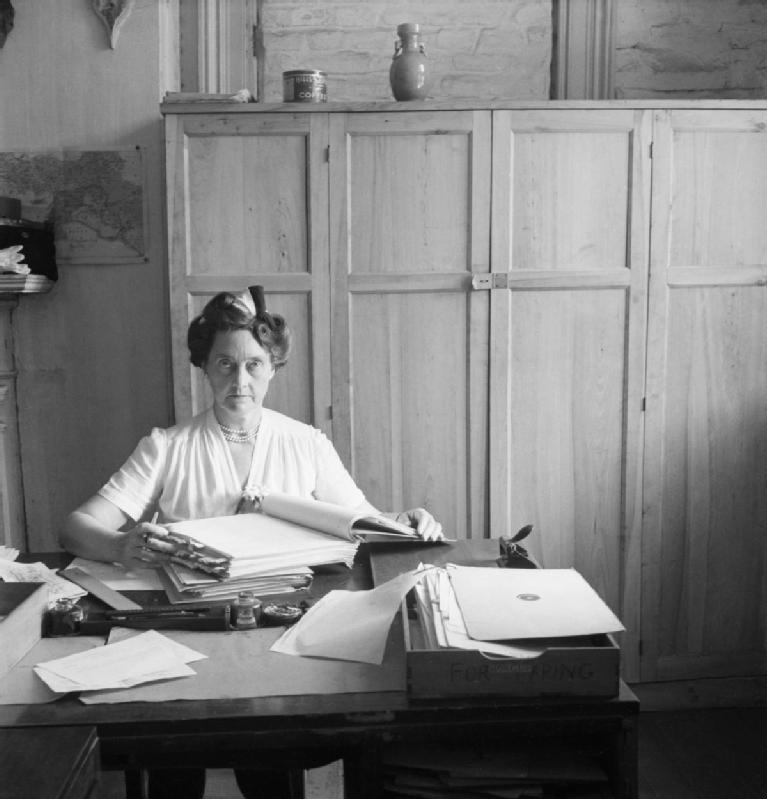
Lady Seymour by Cecil Beaton

The house (together with other property in Bratton) belonged to the diplomat Horace James Seymour and his wife between 1935 and his death in 1979. In their first year there, they added a Garden House designed by Norman Evill, an assistant of Edwin Lutyens, and the dining room and State Bedroom were redesigned by Edith Bowes-Lyon.

During the later years of the Second World War, Bratton House was occupied by St Mary's Convent School, evacuated from Hampstead. Soon after the death of Sir Horace Seymour, the main house was sold to Spencer Loch, 4th Baron Loch. He died in 1991, and in 1997 his widow sold the property to Paul Langridge, whose executors sold it again in 2004.
