= Robin Fraser-Paye =

British costume designer

Robin Fraser-Paye is a British costume designer, noted for his designs of historical garb in television, films and plays from the late 1960s to 2010s.

Fraser-Paye is probably best known for his designs for the Sharpe series in the 1990s.

Much of Fraser-Paye's period costume work for British TV was distributed in American through 'Masterpiece Theatre'. In 1983, The Good Soldier was screened on WNET and the New York Times praised the programme's "gorgeous" costumes, concluding that "this Granada Television production is indeed very special".

Fraser-Paye was nominated for an Emmy award for The Woman He Loved (1988).

== Selected television and film projects ==
- Fall of Eagles (1974), an account of the ruling houses of Europe from 1848 to 1918.
- For the BBC's Shakespeare series, Fraser-Paye designed costumes for As You Like It, Richard II and Much Ado About Nothing (1979).
- Crime and Punishment (1979)
- Coming Through (1988)
- The Woman He Loved (1988), a "very pretty" American production of the story of Wallis Simpson and Edward VIII.
- Agatha Christie's Poirot (1991)
- Born and Bred (2004)

== Selected theatre projects ==
Robin Fraser-Paye was the principal costume designer of numerous Shakespeare productions and also designed the clothing for The Misanthrope at the Stratford Festival.

Fraser-Paye designed costume for at least four plays directed by Harold Pinter in the 1970s and 1980s: Exiles (1970), Blithe Spirit (lighting design, 1976), The Trojan War Will Not Take Place (1983) and Sweet Bird of Youth (1985).
