= John Adams-Acton =

British sculptor

John Adams-Acton (11 December 1830 – 28 October 1910) was a British sculptor.

== Life ==
He was born at Acton Hill, Middlesex, the son of William Adams, a tailor, and Helen Elizabeth Humphreys. Two sons and three daughters survived the father. The second daughter, Clarissa, engaged in art and exhibited at the Royal Academy. To avoid confusion with other artists of the same name, Adams adopted in 1869 the additional surname of Acton from his birthplace.

He was educated at Lady Byron's school, Ealing, and received his first tuition as a sculptor under Timothy Butler. He subsequently worked in the studio of Matthew Noble, and during 1853–1858 he studied at the Royal Academy Schools, where his promise was liberally recognised. He won first medals in the antique and life classes, and the gold medal for an original sculpture group, Eve supplicating forgiveness at the feet of Adam, in December 1855. As a student he exhibited a medallion of Dr. Chalton in 1854, and other medallions in 1855 and 1856. In 1858, he gained the Academy's travelling studentship, and was at Rome till 1865. There his success in portraiture, to which he devoted his main efforts, excited the admiration of John Gibson, who sent many visitors to his studio.

== Works ==
After 1865, Acton settled in London, where he was soon busily employed. He executed the Wesley memorial in Westminster Abbey, the Cruikshank memorial in St Paul's Cathedral, the statue of Wesley in the forecourt of Wesley's Chapel, and the memorial of Cardinal Manning in the newly built Westminster Cathedral. He also executed a colossal statue of Sir Titus Salt, erected near Bradford Town Hall in 1874, and statues of Queen Victoria for Kingston and the Bahamas, of William Ewart Gladstone, a close friend and the godfather of his fourth son, for Blackburn and Liverpool, and of Bishop Samuel Waldegrave for Carlisle Cathedral. Edward VII, as Prince of Wales, sat to him many times, and the Emperor and Empress of Germany showed interest in his art.

He exhibited regularly at the Royal Academy till 1892, sending there statues or busts of Gladstone (1865, 1868, 1869, 1873, 1879), Lord Brougham (1867, 1868), John Bright (1870), Charles Dickens (1871), Charles Spurgeon (1874), Earl Russell (1874), Archbishop Manning (1884), Benjamin Disraeli (1885), and Pope Leo XIII (1888). Others who sat to him were Canon Noel Duckworth, the Earl of Shaftesbury, Dr. Parker, Henry Fawcett, Lord Napier of Magdala, Richard Cobden, Lord Roberts, Dean Frederic Farrar, Sir Wilfrid Lawson, Sir Isaac Holden, Sir Edwin Landseer and many leading academicians. Of his ideal work the best were The First Sacrifice, The Lady of the Lake, Pharaoh's Daughter, Zenobia, and The Millennium.

Acton's last work, which was left unfinished, was a small figure of The Angel of Peace. He died at his wife's home Ormidale, Brodick, in the Isle of Arran which he visited every summer, on 28 October 1910.

== Family ==
Adams-Acton married on 15 August 1875, at St Mark's, Hamilton Terrace, London, author Marion Hamilton of the Isle of Arran; she was the illegitimate daughter of William Hamilton, 11th Duke of Hamilton. They had four sons and three daughters. Two of his sons, Harold and Murray, practised their father's art.
