= Wesley's Chapel =

Methodist church in London

Coordinates: 51°31′25″N 0°5′13″W

- Wesley's Chapel and Leysian Mission
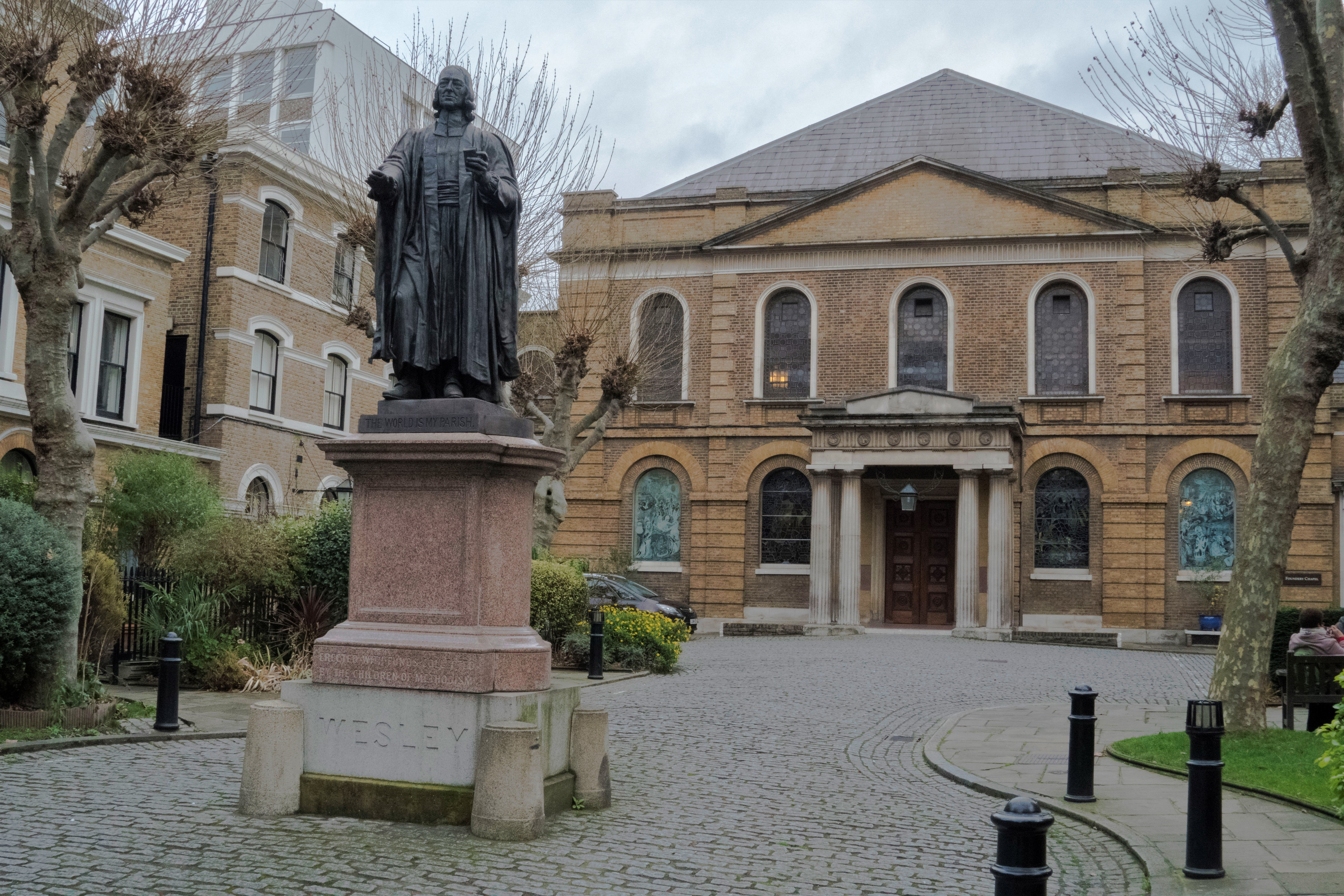
- Chapel and courtyard
- Wesley's Chapel
- Location: 49 City Road, St Luke's, London
- Country: England
- Denomination: Methodist Church of Great Britain
- Website: www.wesleyschapel.org.uk

History
- Status: Chapel
- Founded: 1778
- Founder: John Wesley
- Dedicated: 1778

Architecture
- Functional status: Active
- Architect: George Dance the Younger
- Style: Georgian architecture

Wesley's Chapel (originally the City Road Chapel) is a Methodist church situated in the St Luke's area in the south of the London Borough of Islington. Opened in 1778, it was built under the direction of John Wesley, the founder of the Methodist movement. The site is a place of worship and visitor attraction, incorporating the Museum of Methodism in its crypt and John Wesley's House next to the chapel. The chapel has been called "The Mother Church of World Methodism".

Along with the associated Leysian Mission, Wesley's Chapel is a circuit of the London District of the Methodist Church. As of 2018 the chapel had an average service attendance of about 320 worshippers. As of 2023 the circuit membership is 447.

== History ==
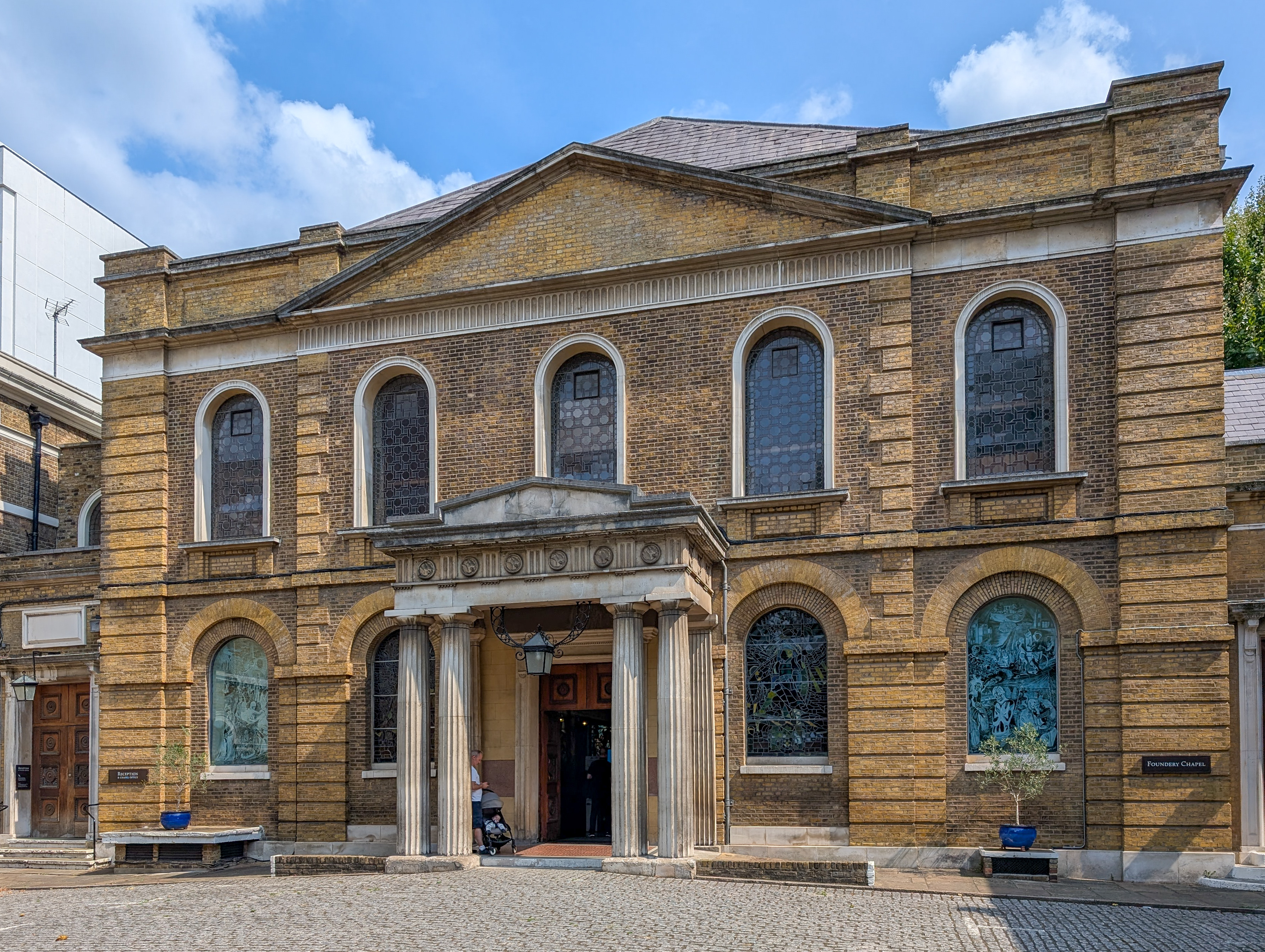
Front of the chapel

In 1776 Methodist leader John Wesley applied to the City of London for a site to build his new chapel and was granted an area of land on City Road. After raising funds from across the Connexion the foundation stone for the chapel was laid on 21 April 1777. The architect was George Dance the Younger, surveyor to the City of London, and the builder was Samuel Tooth, a member of Wesley's Foundery society. The chapel was formally opened with a service on 1 November 1778. The City Road Chapel was established to replace Wesley's earlier London chapel, the Foundery, where he first preached on 11 November 1739.

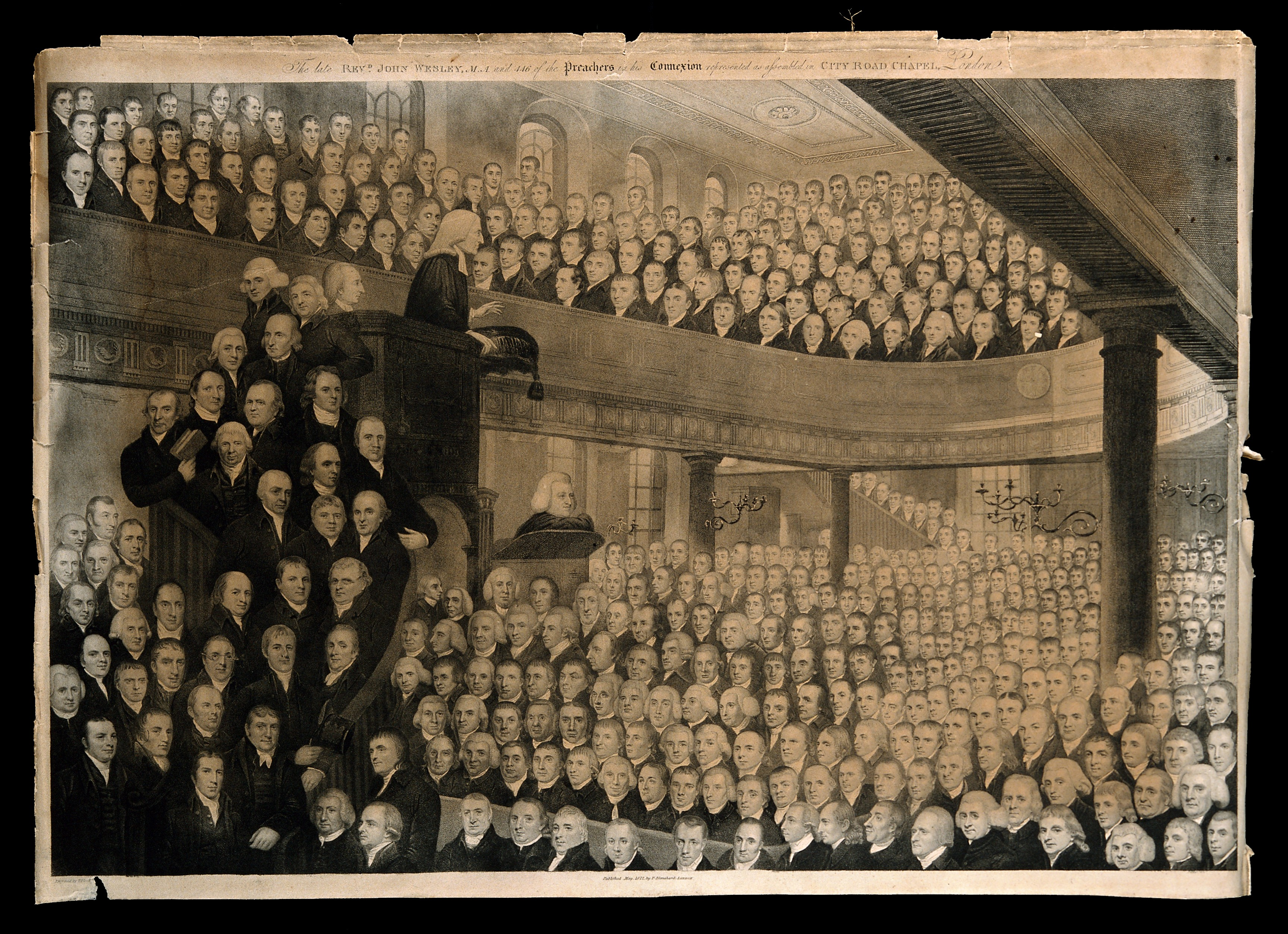
John Wesley preaching in the City Road Chapel. Engraving by T. Blood, 1822.

Wesley's Chapel is constructed in brown brick laid in Flemish bond with dressings of yellow brick and stone. The building has Grade I listed status and is a fine example of Georgian architecture, although it has been altered and improved since it was built. For example, the original plain windows were replaced with stained glass over the course of the 19th century. In 1864, the gallery was modernised, its front lowered and raked seating installed. Around the gallery is motif in relief supposedly designed by Wesley: a dove with an olive branch in its beak encircled by a serpent following its own tail. The Adam style ceiling was replaced by a replica following a fire in 1879.

Another major refurbishment of 1891 was carried out by Holloway Brothers, collaborating with the Methodist architects Elijah Hoole and William Willmer Pocock. (There is a memorial stained glass window dedicated to Pocock.) The foundations were reinforced, the apse windows were enlarged to accommodate the stained glass, and new pews were installed. The pillars supporting the gallery were originally ships' masts donated by King George III, but these were replaced by French jasper pillars donated from Methodist churches overseas. Only the top section of the original three-decker pulpit survives. An organ was installed in 1882 and the present organ in 1891; it was electrified in 1905 and in 1938 its pipes were moved to their present position at the rear of the gallery.

The location of the sanctuary (including the original communion table against the wall) in an apse behind the pulpit was common in the 'auditory' churches of the 18th century, but few other examples survive today. The present sanctuary in front of the pulpit dates from restoration work in the 1970s. Among other alterations, the foundations were again strengthened due to subsistence and the roof was replaced. The chapel was officially reopened on 1 November 1978, by Queen Elizabeth II and Prince Philip, Duke of Edinburgh. The present communion rail was gifted in 1993 by former Prime Minister Margaret Thatcher, who was married in the chapel in 1951.

The chapel has always been served by two or more ministers, and local preachers lead services on occasion. The first woman to preach in Wesley's Chapel was Agnes Elizabeth Slack, in 1926.

== Beliefs ==
=== Marriage ===
The church has an inclusive vision and celebrates both opposite-sex marriages and same-sex marriages.

== Image gallery ==
Interior of Wesley's Chapel

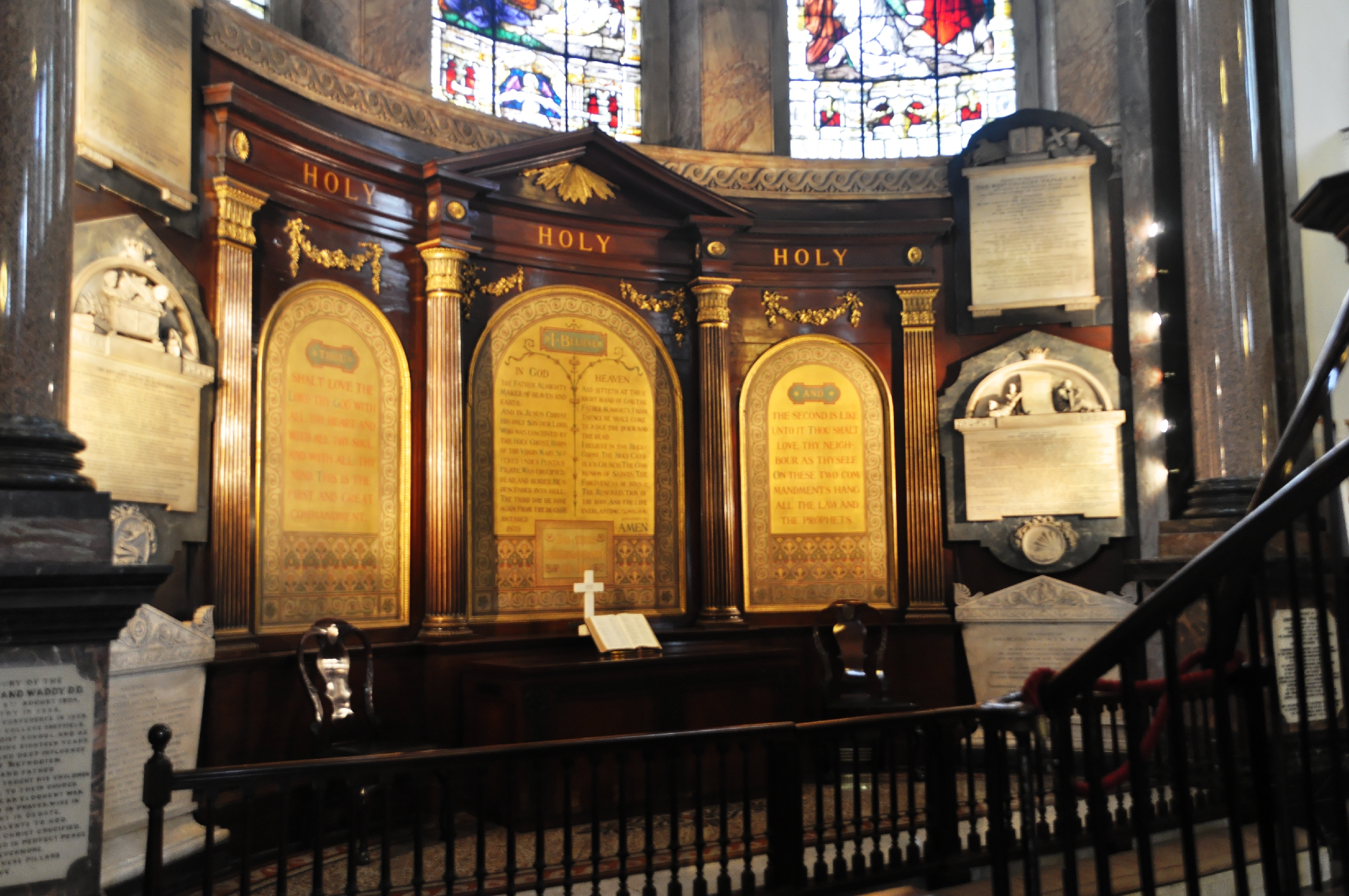
Apse

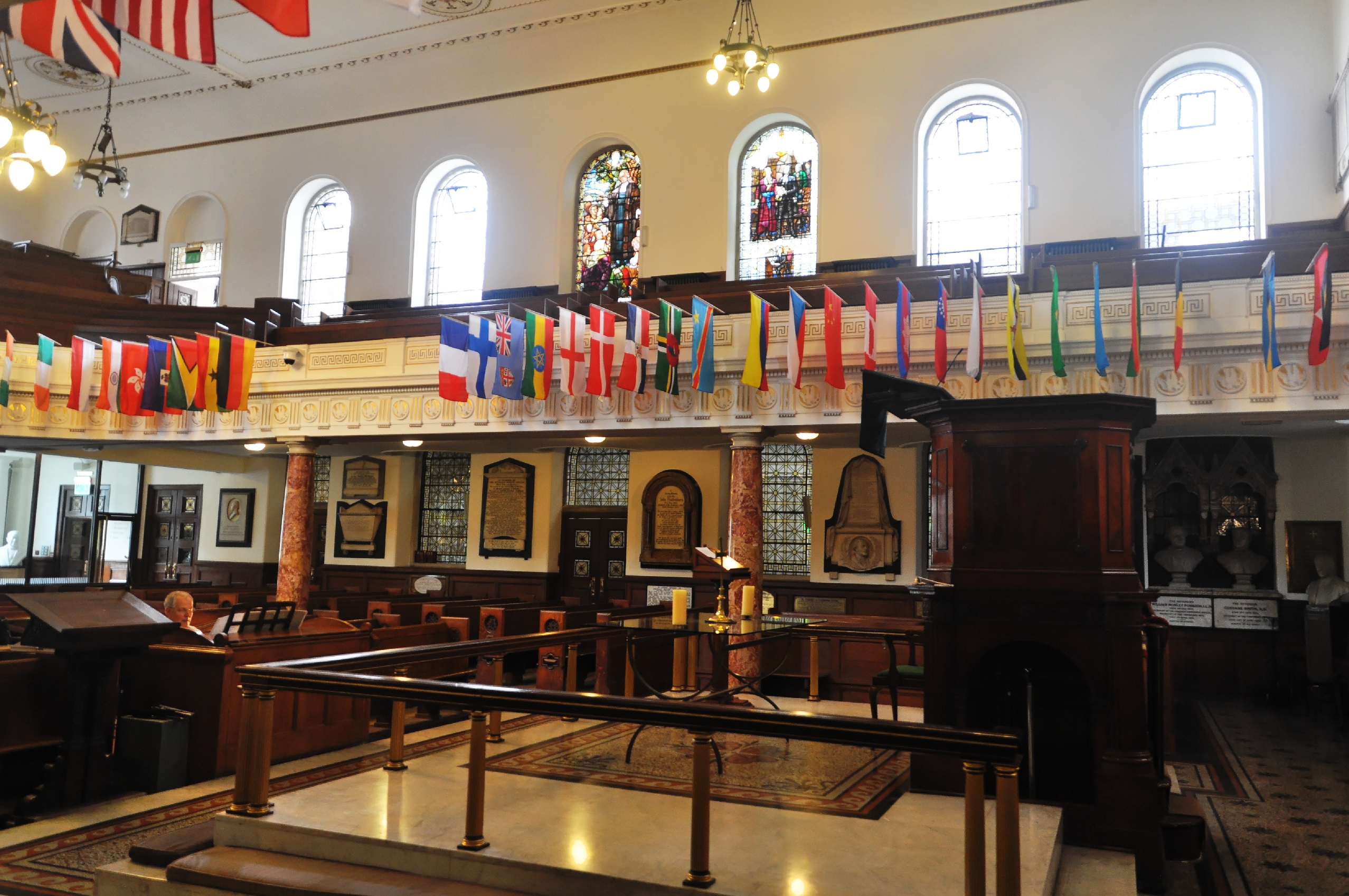
Gallery and pulpit

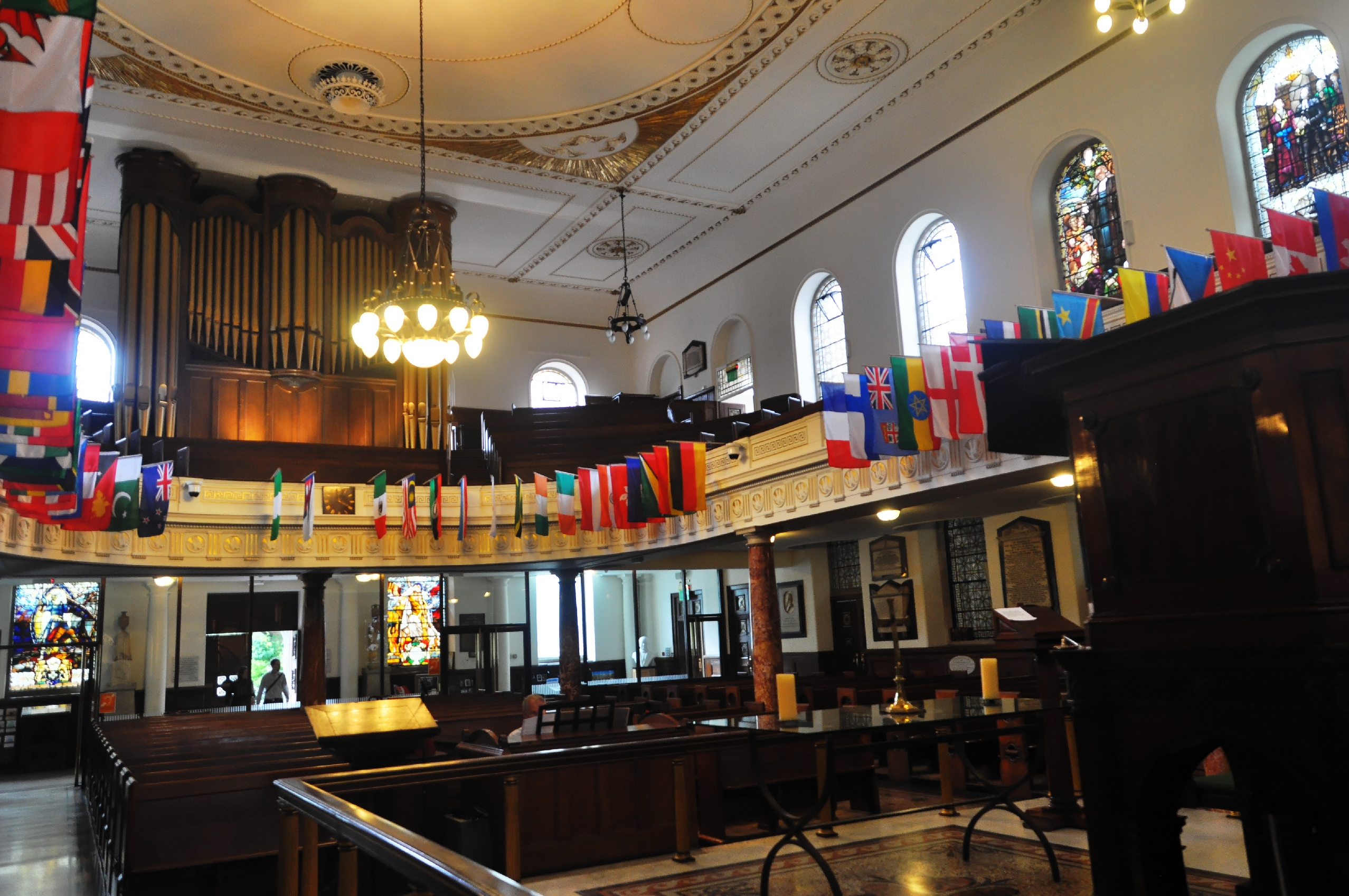
Pews, table and rail, and the organ in the gallery

== The site ==
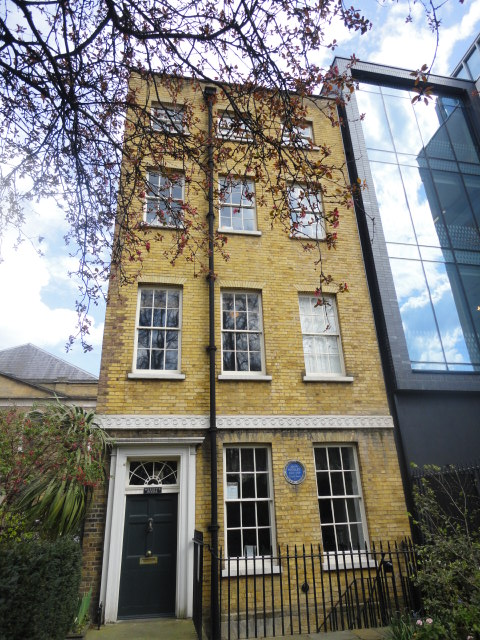
Exterior of the house

The chapel is set within a cobbled courtyard off City Road, with the chapel at the furthest end and Wesley's house on the right.

=== John Wesley's House ===
John Wesley's House, a mid-Georgian townhouse, was built in 1779 at the same time as the chapel. It was Wesley's residence for the last eleven years of his life. He is commemorated by a blue plaque on the City Road frontage. This Grade I listed building is open to visitors as a historic house museum. It was built by Wesley and designed by George Dance the younger, at that time the surveyor of the City of London.

Wesley lived in the house for the last twelve years of his life and died in his bedroom. The house was also used to accommodate travelling preachers and their families. The household servants also lived on the premises. The house continued to be used for travelling preachers after Wesley's death until it was turned into a museum in the 1900s.

In the dining room his Chamber Horse is set up which he used for exercise; on display in the study is his electric machine which was used for the treatment of illness.

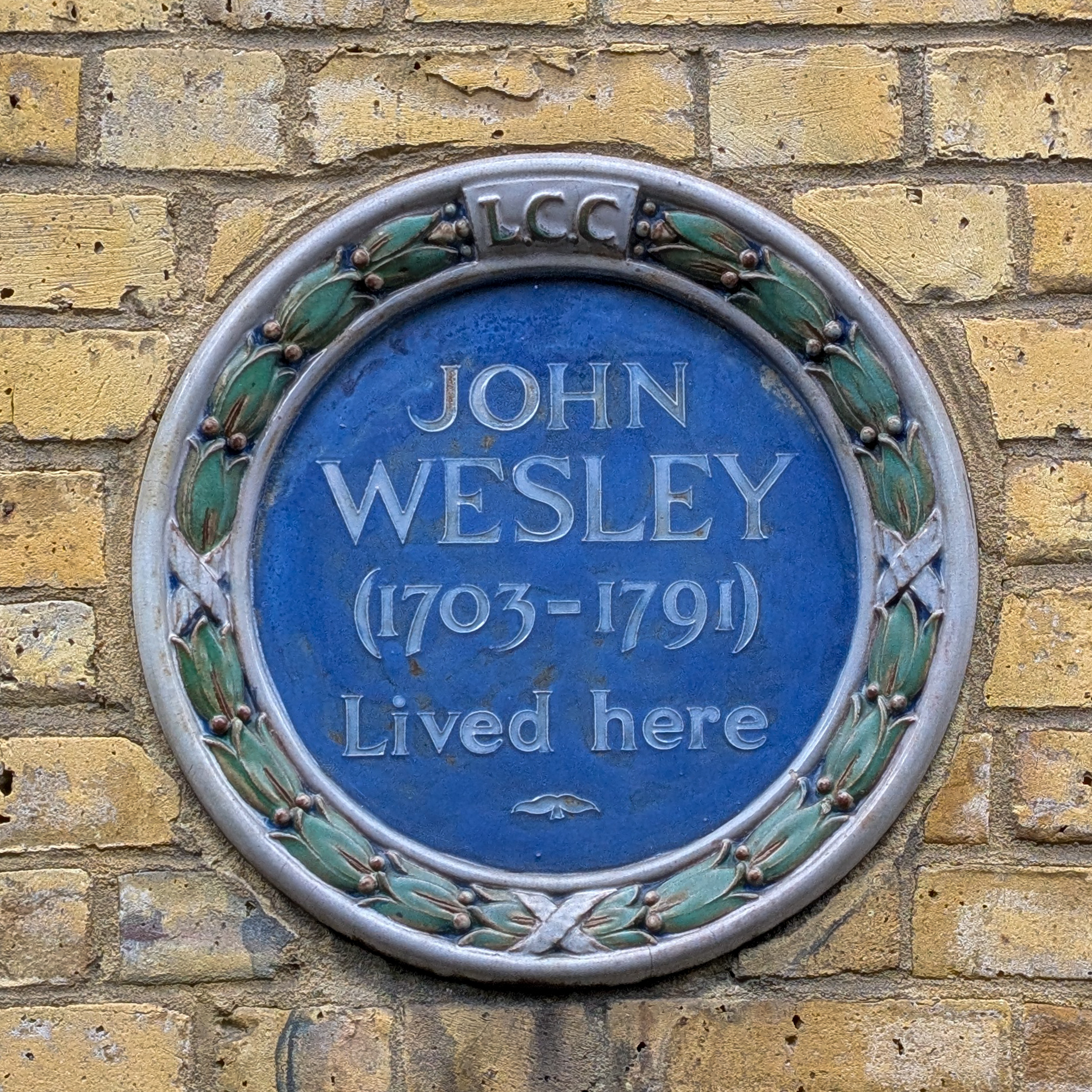
John Wesley blue plaque

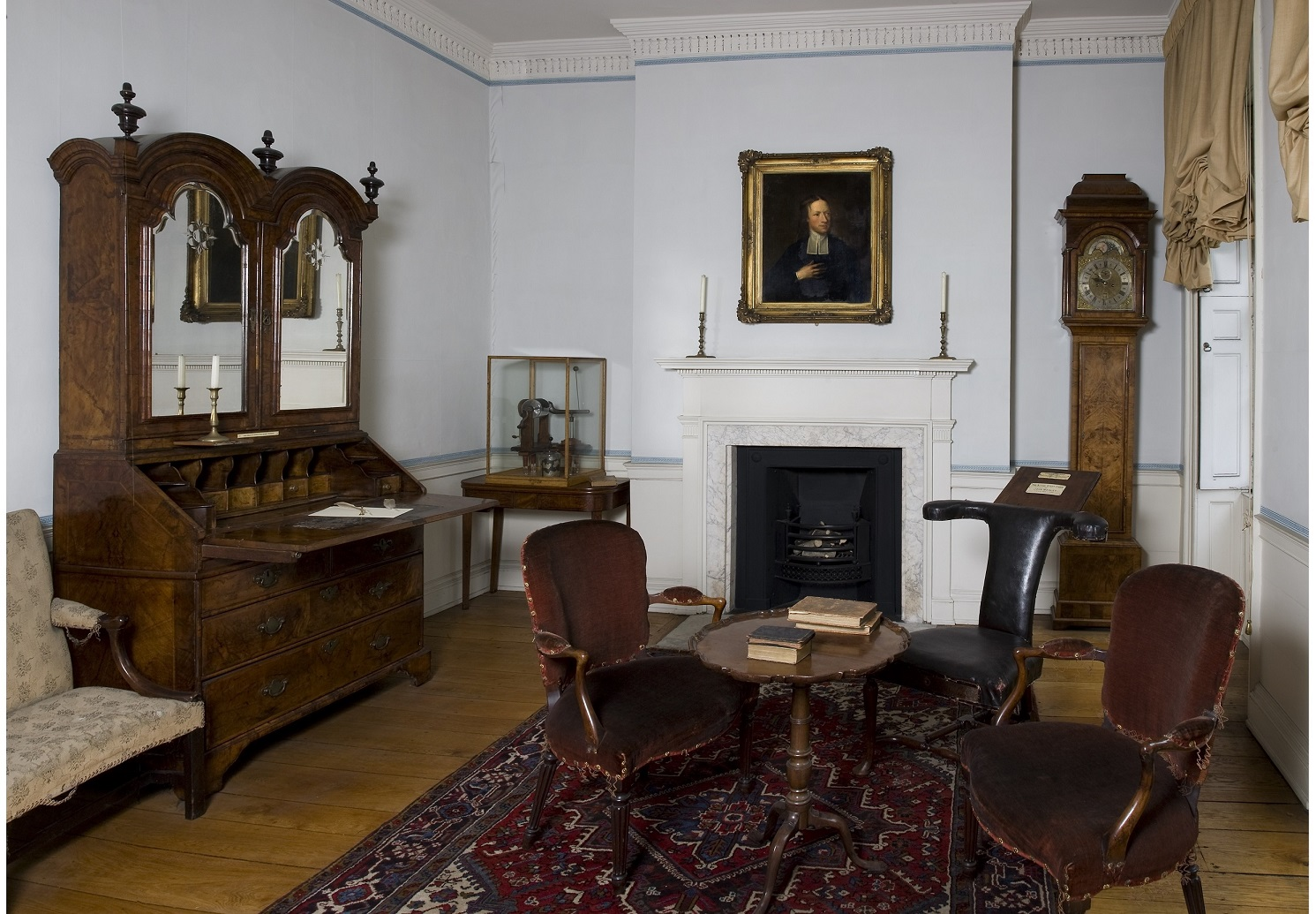
John Wesley's House – Study

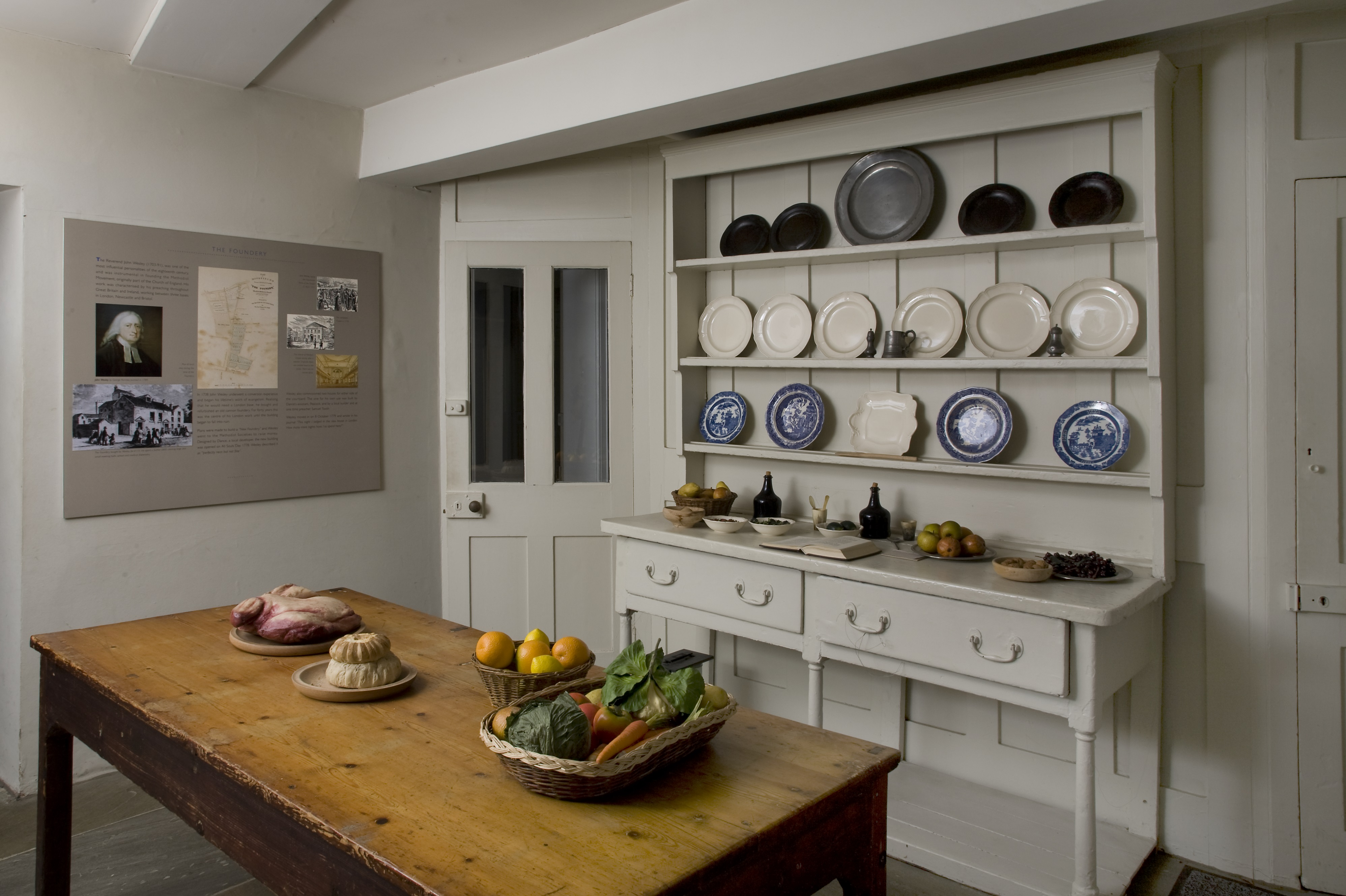
John Wesley's House – Kitchen

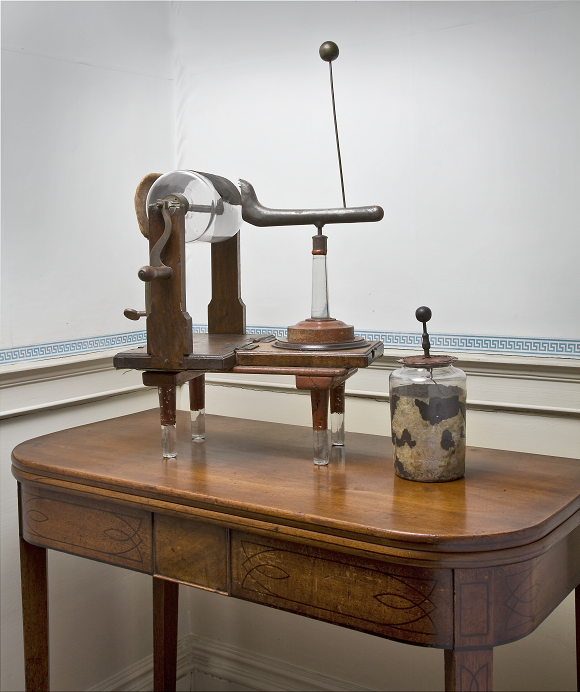
John Wesley's Electric Machine

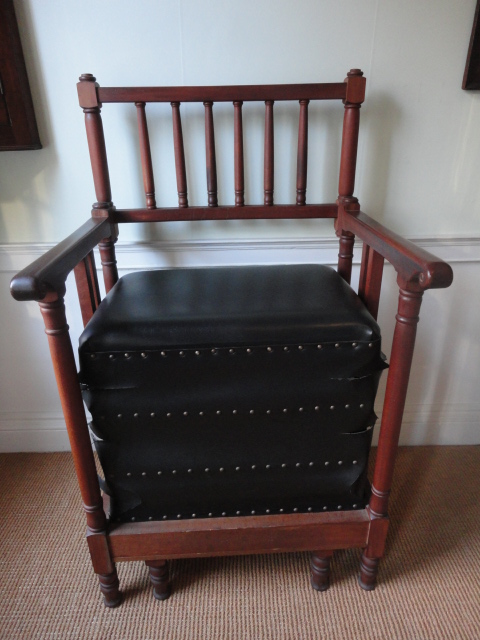
John Wesley's Chamber Horse

=== Courtyard, gardens and cemetery ===
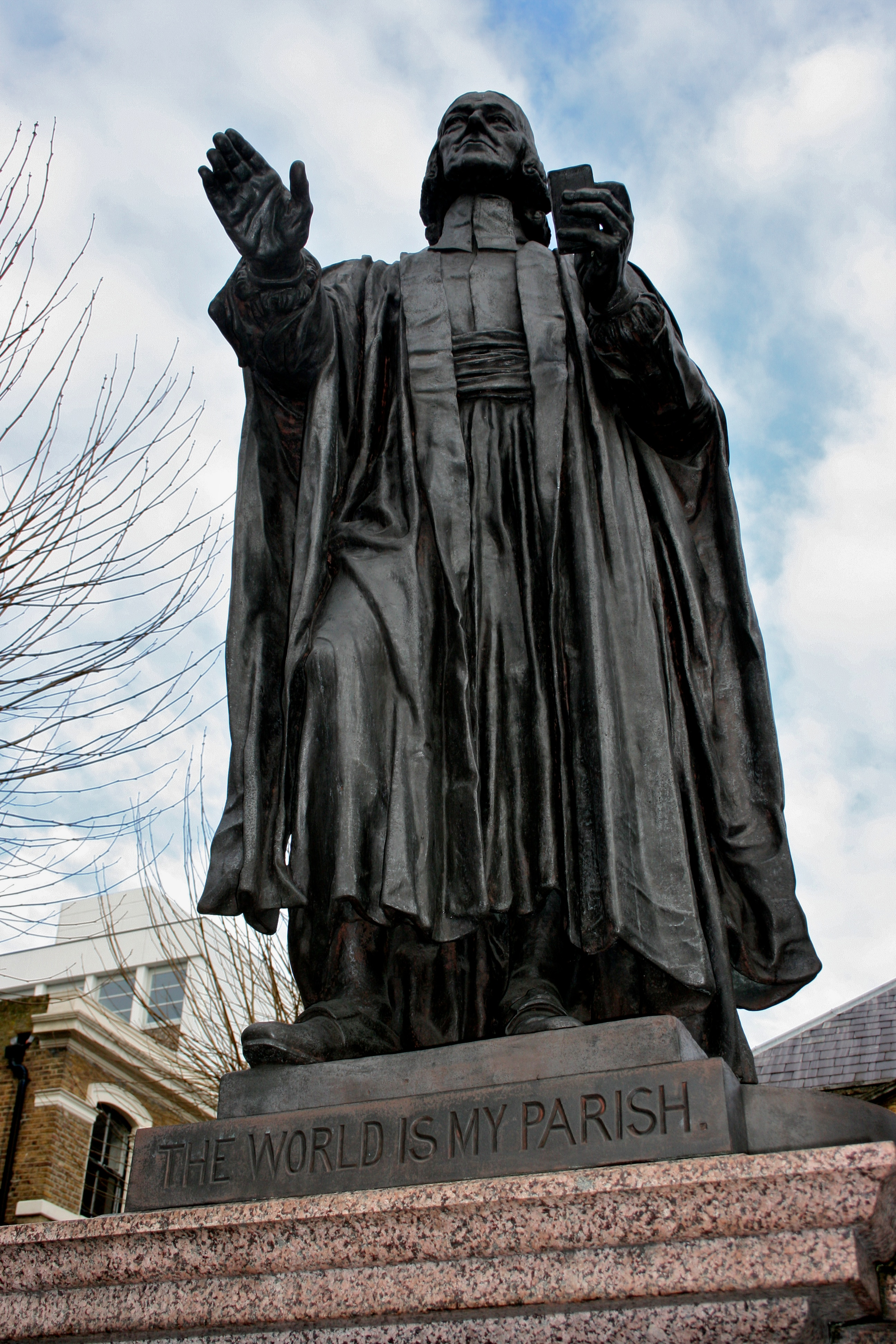
Statue by John Adams-Acton

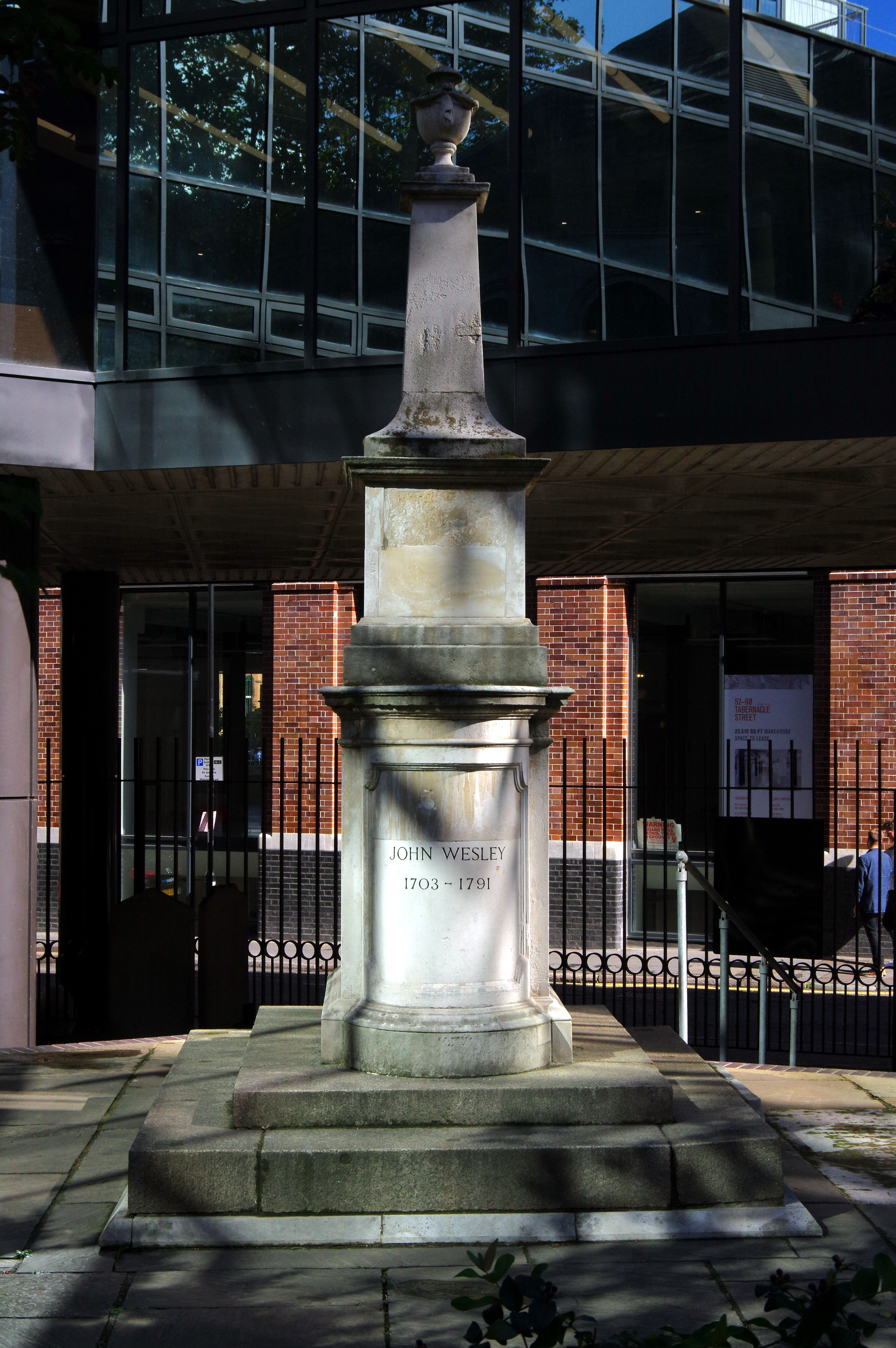
Wesley's tomb

At the front of Wesley's House is a small physic garden which contains herbs mentioned in Wesley's book, The Primitive Physic. It details ways in which common people could cure themselves using natural medicines as they couldn't afford a doctor.

Wesley died on 2 March 1791. His tomb is in the garden at the rear of the chapel alongside the graves of six of his preachers, and those of his sister Martha Hall and his doctor and biographer, Dr John Whitehead. In 1980, an Act was passed to authorise the use of the burial ground of Wesley's Chapel situated in City Road in the London borough of Islington for other purposes, enabling the removal of remains, tombstones and vaults, for the construction of the office building at the rear of the chapel.

A memorial to Susanna Wesley, Wesley's mother, stands just inside the gate to the front courtyard.

A bronze statue of Wesley with the inscription "the world is my parish" stands at the entrance to the courtyard; created in 1891 by John Adams-Acton, the sculpture is Grade II listed. Elijah Hoole was responsible for the 10-foot high granite pedestal on which the statue stands.

=== Victorian lavatory ===
The site also houses one of the few surviving examples of gentlemen's toilets built by the sanitary engineer Thomas Crapper in 1891.

== The Leysian Mission ==
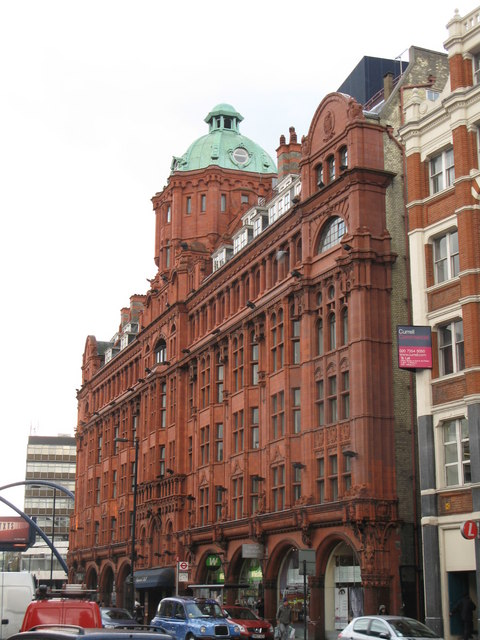
Leysian Mission building, City Road

In 1886 former pupils of The Leys School, Cambridge founded a mission in nearby Whitecross Street. The aim was to improve the lives of the impoverished inhabitants of this part of the East End of London. In 1904 the mission moved to a new site in Old Street, very near Wesley's Chapel. It provided medical facilities, legal advice, financial and dietary assistance, as well as religious services and musical events. After World War II the mission sold the buildings and merged with Wesley's Chapel in 1989.

=== The chapel today ===
The chapel is home to a multicultural congregation with a membership of 447 as of 2023. It is a working church with daily prayer, Sunday Holy Communion services and several weekday services. It is known for its relatively "high church" sacramental liturgy within British Methodism. The superintendent minister is Canon Jennifer Smith. Wesley's Chapel is in an ecumenical partnership with the Anglican St Giles' Cripplegate parish church, Jewin Welsh Presbyterian Chapel, and St Joseph's Roman Catholic Church. It shares a close relationship with the Friends meeting house at Bunhill Fields.

== Museum of Methodism ==
The Museum of Methodism, housed in the chapel's crypt, contains artefacts and relics relating to Methodism, including several of Wesley's speeches and essays on theology, the "warmed heart" "contemplative space", Thomas Coke's writing slope or desk and Donald Soper's portable preaching stand. The museum was created in 1978 and was refurbished in 2014, with the last case being installed in early 2016 thanks to a donation.

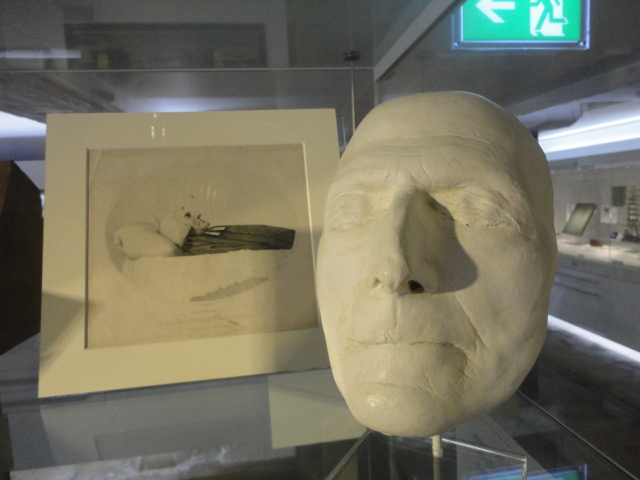
John Wesley's Death Mask

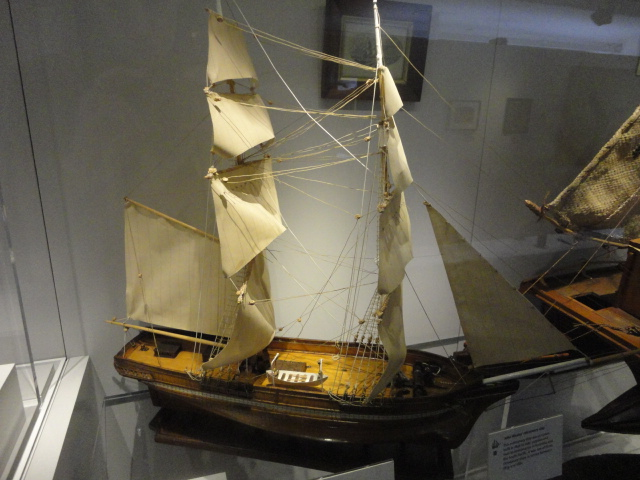
John Wesley Ship

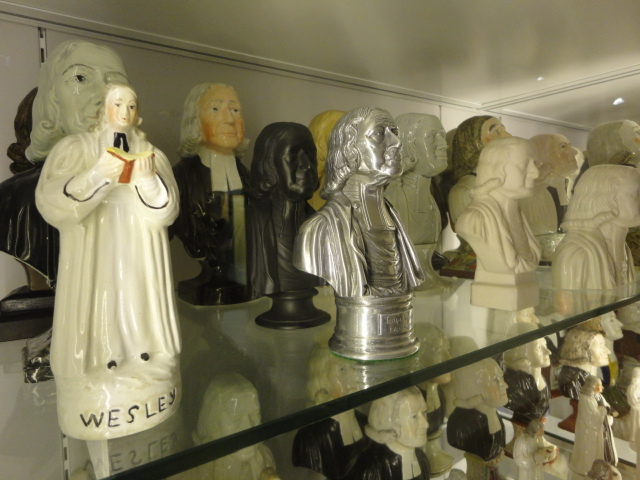
John Wesley Ceramics

== See also ==
- List of Methodist churches
- New Room, Bristol
- Charles Wesley's House
