= The Woman He Loved =

- Jane Seymour and Anthony Andrews
- Genre: Romantic drama
- Written by: William Luce
- Directed by: Charles Jarrott
- Starring: Anthony Andrews; Jane Seymour; Olivia de Havilland; Lucy Gutteridge; Tom Wilkinson; Julie Harris
- Composer: Allyn Ferguson
- Original language: English

Production
- Executive producer: Larry A. Thompson
- Producer: William Hill
- Cinematography: Brian Morgan
- Editor: Terry Maisey
- Running time: 100 minutes
- Production companies: HTV; Larry A. Thompson Productions; New World Television

Original release
- Network: CBS
- Release: 3 April 1988
- Network: ITV
- Release: 12 April 1988

The Woman He Loved is a 1988 British HTV made-for-television romantic drama film for ITV about the abdication of Edward VIII. Directed by Charles Jarrott, it stars Anthony Andrews, Jane Seymour and Olivia de Havilland. Jane Seymour was nominated for a Golden Globe Award for Best Actress – Miniseries or Television Film at the 46th Golden Globe Awards and Julie Harris was nominated for a Primetime Emmy Award for Outstanding Supporting Actress in a Miniseries or a Movie. Costume designer Robin Fraser-Paye was also nominated for Primetime Emmy Award for Outstanding Costume Design for a Miniseries or a Special. It was partly shot at Shirenewton Hall in Monmouthshire. This was Olivia de Havilland's final acting role, before her death in 2020.

== Cast ==
- Anthony Andrews as Edward VIII
- Jane Seymour as Wallis Simpson
- Olivia de Havilland as Aunt Bessie Merryman
- Lucy Gutteridge as Thelma Furness, Viscountess Furness
- Tom Wilkinson as Ernest Simpson
- Julie Harris as Alice Warfield (Mrs Simpson's mother)
- Robert Hardy as Winston Churchill
- Phyllis Calvert as Queen Mary
- Evelyn Laye as Maud Cunard
- David Waller as Stanley Baldwin - He also appeared as Baldwin in ITV's Edward & Mrs Simpson (1978).
- Rupert Frazer as Peregrine Francis Adelbert Cust, 6th Baron Brownlow (Equerry to the Prince of Wales)
- Charlotte Mitchell as Lady Chatfield
- Margaretta Scott as Lady Wigram
- Richard Wilson as Norman Birkett, 1st Baron Birkett
