= Silchester House =

Coordinates: 51.35284°N 1.0985°W

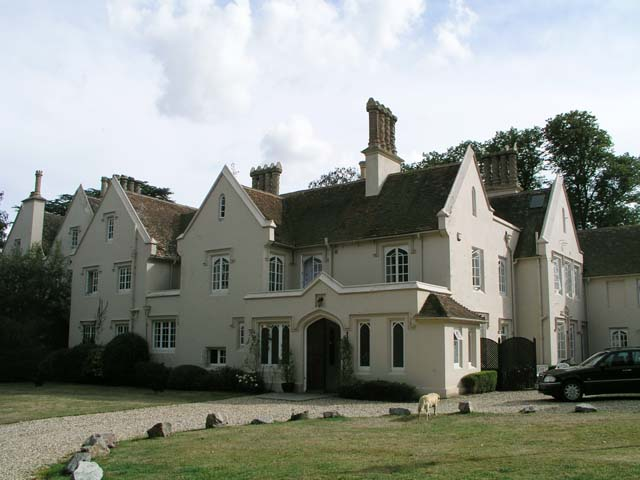

Silchester House is a Victorian mansion located in Silchester, in the Basingstoke and Deane district, in Hampshire, England, on the border with Berkshire. The west wing of the house dates back to the 17th century while newer parts of the house, such as the library and music room, were added in the late 1920s by Thomas Hartley of Hartley's. Today, it is owned by the company Bijou Wedding Venues and used to host parties and weddings. On 17 October 1984 it became a Grade II listed building.
