= Ian Oswald Liddell =

British recipient of the Victoria Cross

Ian Oswald Liddell VC
- Born: 19 October 1919; Shanghai, China
- Died: 21 April 1945 (aged 25); Rotenburg an der Wümme, Germany
- Burial place: Becklingen War Cemetery, Germany
- Relatives: Major David Liddell MC (brother)
- Military career
- Allegiance: United Kingdom
- Branch: British Army
- Service years: 1940 – 1945
- Rank: Captain
- Service number: 156048
- Units: King's Shropshire Light Infantry; Coldstream Guards
- Conflicts: World War II: Western Front; Western Allied invasion of Germany †
- Awards: Victoria Cross

Captain Ian Oswald Liddell VC (19 October 1919 – 21 April 1945) was a British recipient of the Victoria Cross, the highest and most prestigious award for gallantry in the face of the enemy that can be awarded to British and Commonwealth forces.

== Background ==
Born in Shanghai, he enlisted as a private in the King's Shropshire Light Infantry in 1940 before being commissioned in the Coldstream Guards. Whilst stationed in London, he was involved with the reception of Rudolf Hess in the Tower of London who had been arrested in Scotland, his brother David having had a part in his capture.

== The VC action ==
Liddell was 25 years old, and a temporary captain in the 5th Battalion, Coldstream Guards, British Army during the Second World War when the following deed took place for which he was awarded the VC.

In Germany, on 3 April 1945, Liddell was commanding a company of the Coldstream Guards, which was ordered to capture intact a bridge over the River Ems near Lingen. The bridge was covered on the far bank by an enemy strong point, which was subsequently discovered to consist of 150 entrenched infantry supported by three 88 mm and two 20 mm guns. The bridge was also prepared for demolition with 250 kg bombs, which could plainly be seen. Having directed his two leading platoons onto the near bank, Captain Liddell ran forward alone to the bridge and scaled the 3 m high road block guarding it, with the intention of neutralising the charges and taking the bridge intact. In order to achieve his object he had to cross the whole length of the bridge by himself under intense enemy fire, which increased as his objective became apparent to the Germans. Having disconnected the charges on the far side, he re-crossed the bridge and cut the wires on the near side. It was necessary for him to kneel, forming an easy target, whilst he successively cut the wires. He then discovered that there were also charges underneath the bridge. Completely undeterred he also disconnected these. His task completed, he then climbed up on to the road-block in full view of the enemy and signalled his leading platoon to advance. Thus alone and unprotected, without cover, and under heavy enemy fire, he achieved his object. The bridge was captured intact and the way cleared for the advance across the River Ems.

He was killed in action near Rotenburg an der Wümme in Germany (a town near Scheeßel) on 21 April 1945. He was shot by a sniper whose bullet killed another officer, going through his head and then into Liddell. He is buried in Becklingen War Cemetery, Soltau, Germany.

== The Medal ==
His Victoria Cross is displayed at The Guards Regimental Headquarters (Coldstream Guards RHQ), Wellington Barracks, London, England.

== Family ==
Liddell's grandfather, Sir Charles Oswald Liddell, was the owner of Shirenewton Hall, near Chepstow, Monmouthshire.

In January 1945 in Kensington, London, he married Patricia Mary Patton-Bethune, daughter of Charlie Lionel Patton-Bethune MC (1882-1957) and his wife Mary Monica Lester (1881-1968). At the time she was a Section Officer in the WAAF and it was she who received her husband's VC from King George VI in a special investiture for next of kin held at Buckingham Palace on 12 February 1946.

== Sources ==
- John, Laffin (1997). British VCs of World War 2: A Study in Heroism. Sutton Publishing. ISBN 0-7509-1026-7.
