= Shirenewton Hall =

Country house in Monmouthshire, Wales

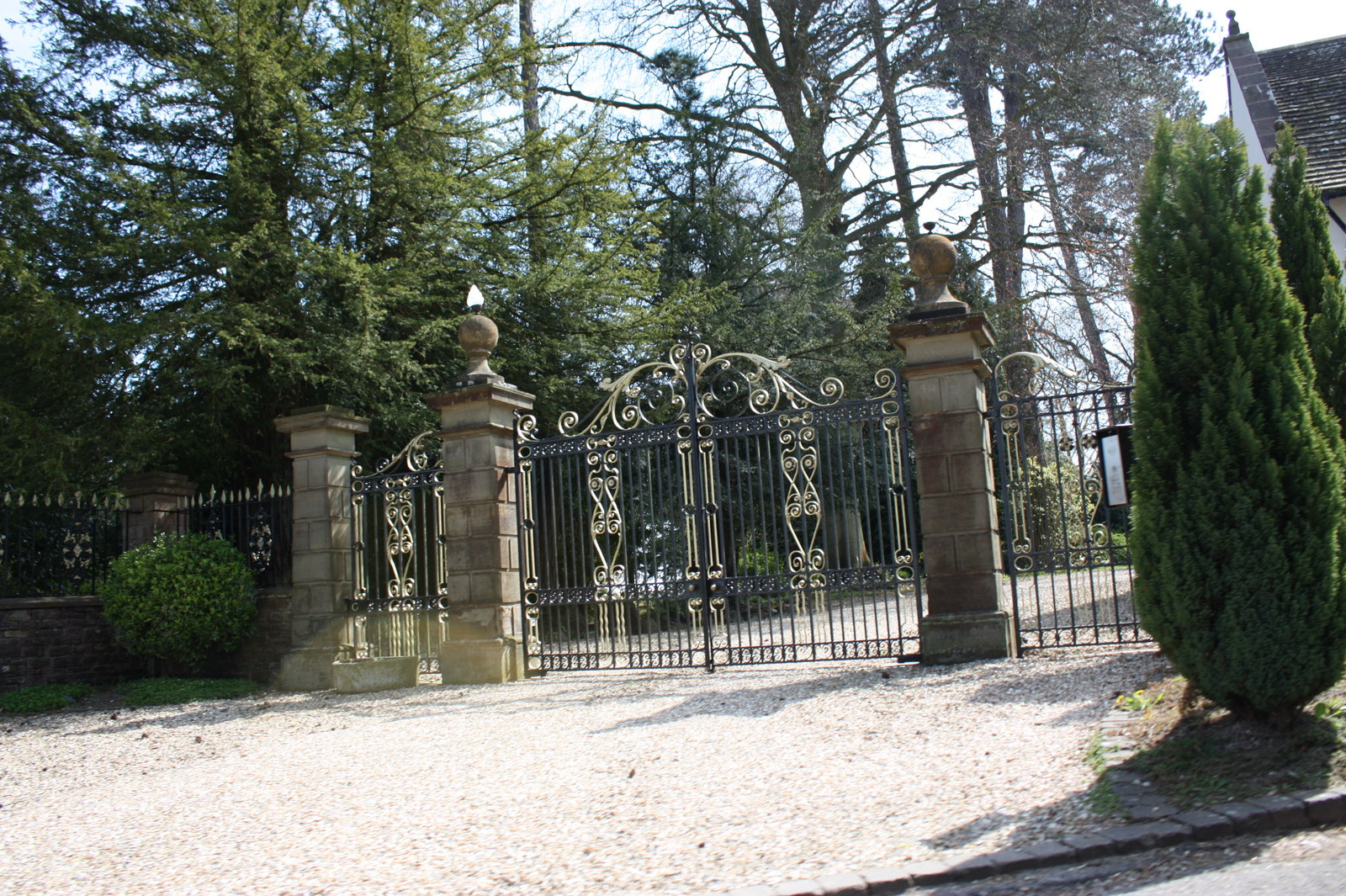
- The gates to the hall. The hall itself is not visible from the public highway.

- Location within Monmouthshire

General information
- Location: Shirenewton, Monmouthshire, Wales
- Coordinates: 51°38′13.56″N 2°45′5.4″W

Technical details
- Floor area: 18,000 square feet (1,700 m^{2})

Design and construction
- Designations: Grade II listed / Cadw/ICOMOS Register of Parks and Gardens of Special Historic Interest in Wales

Shirenewton Hall, originally Shirenewton Court, is a country house and estate adjoining the village of Shirenewton, Monmouthshire, Wales, about 3 miles (4.8 km) west of Chepstow. The 29.5-acre (11.9 ha) estate is located on a hillside, and commands views across the "Golden Valley" to the west and the Severn Estuary in the south. The main building was constructed around 1830, and partly rebuilt around 1900–1910, on the site of an earlier house which was the birthplace of William Blethyn, Bishop of Llandaff. The house is now a Grade II listed building, and the teahouse in the adjoining Japanese garden is listed as Grade II*. The gardens are included on the Cadw/ICOMOS Register of Parks and Gardens of Special Historic Interest in Wales. The estate is not open to the public.

== History ==
Prior to the construction of Shirenewton Court, an earlier building was occupied since the Middle Ages by the Blethyn (or Bleddyn) family. It was William Blethyn's birthplace, probably around 1520; he died in 1590.

Shirenewton Hall was built around 1830 in an Italianate style on or near the site of the older building. It was built for William Hollis by an unknown architect. Hollis, a descendant of an industrialist family who developed paper mills at nearby Mounton, was the Sheriff of Monmouthshire in 1831.

About fifty years after Shirenewton Hall's construction, when it was no longer known as Shirenewton Court, the Blethyn family had "descended in the social scale", and sold the property to Edward Joseph Lowe. He was a botanist, horticulturalist, meteorologist and writer who was largely responsible for designing and planting the surrounding gardens. Lowe added two open pavilions, the larger being of sandstone with a glazed tile roof, while the smaller had a copper roof. He also added a summer house with a marble sundial. Lowe wrote many books on the cultivation of woodland ferns and some species of these grow around the churchyard walls at Shirenewton Church.

After Lowe's death in 1900, the estate was sold to Charles Oswald Liddell, a wealthy shipping merchant who traded with China and Japan and who became Sheriff of Monmouthshire in 1918. Liddell's renovations included exchanging the Italianate facade with a Jacobean style in 1901. An east wing, added in 1909, was designed by Chepstow architect Norman Evill, a pupil of Edwin Lutyens; it included a billiard room, loggia, and belvedere tower. The north end of the house was also remodeled. Various stones were used during the renovation, including mauve Old Red Sandstone and yellow Bath stone.

In 1988, the BBC television film The Woman He Loved, about the abdication of King Edward VIII, starring Anthony Andrews and Olivia de Havilland and Jane Seymour, was partly shot at the estate. The property remains a private home that is not open to the public, although the grounds have occasionally been used for fundraising events. It has been placed on the market for sale on a number of occasions in the 21st century.

== Architecture ==
The west entrance front of the house, and the south front facing the gardens, are of two storeys, roughly symmetrical. They feature parapet gables and ball finials. In the southern elevation, there is an Italianate veranda and stone pillar archways. A walled, flagged terrace includes a pond and fountain.

The treatment of the Elizabethan style central hall and staircase have been described as a "great dramatic coup". Other features include the two-storeyed hall, an atrium, an upper balcony which holds an organ, a ballroom, and a second lower balcony which enjoys great views from a high window. The dining room, designed in 1910, is by Murray Adams-Acton. The hall has a master bedroom suite with two dressing rooms and a bathroom, plus eleven further bedrooms, extensive cellars and a heated indoor pool. The house is a Grade II listed building.

== Grounds ==
The grounds include a Japanese garden, containing six ponds at different levels; a teahouse, now a Grade II* listed building; two bridges, one painted red and the other of stone; and winding pathways. Many of the plants and trees were grown from seed brought back by Liddell from the Far East. The east lawn has an immense 1.5 tonnes (1.5 long tons; 1.7 short tons) temple bell hanging under a pagoda style roof which was brought to the hall in 1903 after the Boxer Rebellion in China. The gardens are listed at Grade II* on the Cadw/ICOMOS Register of Parks and Gardens of Special Historic Interest in Wales. The estate also contains stables of classical design, dating from the 1830s and now converted into residential accommodation. A roadside entrance lodge in Tudor style was designed by Evill.
