= Marion Adams-Acton =

Scottish novelist (1846-1928)

- Born: Marion Hamilton; 21 June 1846; Brodick, Isle of Arran, Scotland
- Died: 11 October 1928 (aged 82); London, England
- Citizenship: British
- Occupations: playwright, novelist
- Spouse(s): John Adams-Acton, sculptor
- Relatives: illegitimate daughter of the Duke of Hamilton
- Writing career
- Pen name: Jeanie Hering
- Period: 1867–1894
- Genres: children's writing, travel writing

Marion Jean Catherine Adams-Acton (21 June 1846 – 11 October 1928) was a Scottish novelist who wrote under the pseudonym "Jeanie Hering".

== Early life and education ==
She was born Marion Jean Catherine Hamilton at Brodick on the Isle of Arran on 21 June 1846, the illegitimate daughter of William, 11th Duke of Hamilton and a local island beauty, Elizabeth Hamilton.

The Duke owned Brodick Castle, where one of his regular summer visitors was a popular landscape painter George Hering, the son of one of London's most successful bookbinders, Charles Hering Sr. George and his wife Caroline had lost their only child at the age of six, and the Duke suggested that they adopt Marion. Her mother was reluctant but was persuaded that her daughter would get a much better start to life with this wealthy, well-connected couple.

Marion's adoptive parents took her to London when she was about four year old, although they would return every summer to Ormidale, their house on Arran. In London she was known as Jeanie Hering, the name she later used to publish her books. After receiving a good schooling to the age of sixteen she spent two years at a finishing school in Westphalia in Germany. After returning to London, the family were travelling to Arran by train it crashed, killing hundreds; they were among the fortunate survivors.

== Married life ==
The Herings' house in St John's Wood was in the midst of a thriving artistic community and it was no surprise that on 10 August 1875 Jeanie married an artist, John Adams-Acton, one of England's top sculptors.

Shortly after their marriage the couple took a tour across Europe to India where they spent several months in Bombay. When they returned they settled in a house in Marylebone. When both of her adopted parents died Marian inherited Ormidale, which she always visited for some time in the summer.

Around 1880 the couple moved to 14 Langford Place, St John's Wood; at that time the house was named "Sunnyside" and included the present numbers 12 and 16. During their time at Langford Place, Jeanie became a mother to seven children. The couple held numerous soirées and afternoon bazaars for friends and neighbours, and Sunnyside became a leading social centre for politicians and artists, including Sarah Bernhardt. John Adams-Acton was a close friend of William Ewart Gladstone, and Jeanie in 1884 organised a large charity event with Mrs Gladstone called "The Sunnyside Bee". By the 1890s Jeanie was socialising in the highest circles with kings, queens and prime ministers, and although she wrote plays, one of which was performed at the Strand Theatre, she wrote no more fiction.

She was looking for a new challenge in her life when her husband came home one day and announced that some friends had just walked from London to Dorset. Enamoured with this idea, she decided that the summer trip to Arran should be made that year on foot. Her husband quite reasonably objected on the grounds that his friends were just a couple, whereas she had six children, the youngest not even a year old; and of course Arran was considerably further than Dorset. Unperturbed, she undertook the journey of 500 miles (800 kilometres) in about 7 weeks, with the poor nurse Ellen having to push the young child in a perambulator. The story of the journey became her last book, being published in 1894 as Adventures of a Perambulator.

In 1908 Adams-Acton incurred serious injuries when he was knocked over by a car; a lingering illness resulted in his death at Ormidale in 1910. He is commemorated by a memorial plaque at 14 Langford Place, unveiled on 19 July 1994.

== Later life ==
All Jeanie's sons survived the war and she herself lived to the age of eighty-two, dying in London on 11 October 1928. Her body was removed to Brodick on Arran, where she was buried in a small churchyard.

== Writing ==
All her known works were published under the name "Jeanie Hering". Many of her stories contain religious themes, and she was a regular contributor to The Quiver, a Christian magazine.

== Bibliography ==
=== Fiction ===
- Garry: a holiday story, 1867, London
- Patsy's First Glimpse of Heaven, c.1870
- The Wee Bit Lassie, 1871
- Little pickles; A tale for children, 1872, London
- Truth will out; A tale, 1873, London
- Nothing like experience, 1873
- Golden days; A tale of girls' school life in Germany, 1873, London
- In the wind and the rain, 1873
- Through the mist, 1874, London (3 volumes)
- Gold in the sky, 1875
- Honour and glory; or, Hard to win; A book for boys, 1876, London
- The child's delight; A picture book for little children, 1878, London
- The town mouse, 1880, London
- A banished monarch, and other stories, 1880, London, Paris and New York
- Wee Lammie, 1880, London
- Minnie's Dolls, 1880, London
- A Rough Diamond; A Christmas story, 1880, London
- Honour is my Guide, 1886, London
- Elf; A Tale, 1887, London
- Put to the Test; A Tale, 1888, London
- Rosebud, 1891, London

=== Non-fiction ===
- The dog picture book, 1880, London
- Pet Dogs, 1890
- Doggie's Own Book, 1890, London.
- Adventures of a perambulator; True details of a family history, 1894, London

== Sources and external links ==
- Pickering, Anna Victorian Sidelights. From the papers of the late Mrs. Adams-Acton. 1954. London. 288pp+ 8 leaves of plates.
- Peiffer S. 'Acton, Marion Jean Catherine Adams- (1846–1928)', Oxford Dictionary of National Biography, (Oxford University Press; 2004)
