= Marylebone East (London County Council constituency) =

London County Council constituency

- Former constituency for the London County Council

Former constituency
- Created: 1889
- Abolished: 1919
- Member(s): 2
- Replaced by: St Marylebone

Marylebone East was a constituency used for elections to the London County Council between 1889 and 1919. The seat shared boundaries with the UK Parliament constituency of the same name.

== Councillors ==
Year	Name	Party	Name	Party
1889	Horace Farquhar	Moderate	Harry Marks	Moderate
1892	Horace Farquhar	Moderate	Edmund Boulnois	Moderate
1901	Walter Leaf	Independent	John Fletcher Little	Independent
1904	William Bridgeman	Conservative	Henry Lopes	Conservative
1904	Earl of Essex	Conservative	Henry Lopes	Conservative
1907	Vere Ponsonby	Municipal Reform	James Boyton	Municipal Reform
1910	Alexander Thynne	Municipal Reform	Hercules Pakenham	Municipal Reform
1912	Alexander Thynne	Municipal Reform	Ernest Debenham	Municipal Reform

== Election results ==
1889 London County Council election: Marylebone East
Party	Candidate	Votes	%	±%
Moderate	Harry Marks	1,874		
Moderate	Horace Farquhar	1,815		
Progressive	Thomas Farrer	1,300		
Progressive	Timothy Holmes	1,201		
Moderate win (new seat)				
Moderate win (new seat)				

1892 London County Council election: Marylebone East
Party	Candidate	Votes	%	±%
Moderate	Edmund Boulnois	Unopposed	N/A	
Moderate	Horace Farquhar	Unopposed	N/A	
Moderate hold		Swing		
Moderate hold		Swing		

1895 London County Council election: Marylebone East
Party	Candidate	Votes	%	±%
Moderate	Edmund Boulnois	2,164		
Moderate	Horace Farquhar	2,114		
Progressive	William Barker	1,512		
Progressive	Frank Debenham	1,408		
Moderate hold		Swing		
Moderate hold		Swing		

1898 London County Council election: Marylebone East
Party	Candidate	Votes	%	±%
Moderate	Horace Farquhar	2,182		
Moderate	Edmund Boulnois	2,089		
Progressive	John Fletcher Little	1,516		
Progressive	T. Slater	1,419		
Moderate hold		Swing		
Moderate hold		Swing		

1901 London County Council election: Marylebone East
Party	Candidate	Votes	%	±%
Independent	Walter Leaf	1,959	25.7	+6.0
Independent	John Fletcher Little	1,897	24.9	+3.9
Conservative	John Samuel Underhill	1,896	24.9	−5.4
Conservative	Thomas Brooke-Hitching	1,866	24.5	−4.5
Independent gain from Conservative		Swing		
Independent gain from Conservative		Swing	+5.0	

1904 London County Council election: Marylebone East
Party	Candidate	Votes	%	±%
Conservative	Henry Lopes	2,848		
Conservative	William Bridgeman	2,779		
Progressive	John Fletcher Little	1,762		
Progressive	Walter Leaf	1,747		
Majority				
Conservative gain from Independent		Swing		
Conservative gain from Independent		Swing		

1907 London County Council election: Marylebone East
Party	Candidate	Votes	%	±%
Municipal Reform	Vere Ponsonby	3,612		
Municipal Reform	James Boyton	3,562		
Progressive	John Fletcher Little	2,446		
Progressive	F. Gill	467		
Majority				
Municipal Reform hold		Swing		

1910 London County Council election: Marylebone East
Party	Candidate	Votes	%	±%
Municipal Reform	Hercules Pakenham	3,089		
Municipal Reform	Alexander Thynne	3,056		
Progressive	H. J. Helsdon	1,100		
Progressive	Samuel Eli Hugo Kilner	1,050		
Majority				
Municipal Reform hold		Swing		

1913 London County Council election: Marylebone East
Party	Candidate	Votes	%	±%
Municipal Reform	Ernest Debenham	3,492	38.7	+1.5
Municipal Reform	Alexander Thynne	3,411	37.8	+1.0
Progressive	Thomas W. McCormack	1,056	11.7	−1.6
Progressive	Hilda Caroline Miall-Smith	1,055	11.7	−1.0
Majority		2,355	26.1	+2.5
Municipal Reform hold		Swing	+1.5	
Municipal Reform hold		Swing	+1.0	
