= 1913 London County Council election =

- 5 March 1913

118 Council Seats 60 seats needed for a majority

	First party	Second party	Third party
Leader	Cyril Jackson	Sir John Benn	None
Party	Municipal Reform	Progressive	Labour
Leader's seat	Limehouse	Kennington	—
Last election	60 seats	55 seats	3 seats
Seats won	67	50	1
Seat change	▲7	▼6	▼2
Popular vote	229,583	173,186	24,307
Percentage	53.5%	40.3%	5.7%
- Colours denote the winning party.

An election to the County Council of London took place on 5 March 1913. It was the ninth triennial election of the whole Council. The size of the council was 118 councillors and 19 aldermen. The councillors were elected for electoral divisions corresponding to the parliamentary constituencies that had been created by the Representation of the People Act 1884. There were 57 dual member constituencies and one four member constituency. The council was elected by First Past the Post with each elector having two votes in the dual member seats. Unlike for parliamentary elections, women qualified as electors for these elections on exactly the same basis as men. Women were also permitted to stand as candidates for election.

The election was to be the last held before the outbreak of the First World War: in 1915 legislation was enacted to postpone all local elections until the end of the conflict (see below). The term of office of the councillors was extended to 1919 when triennial elections resumed.

== National government background ==
The Prime Minister of the day was the Liberal H. H. Asquith who led a minority Liberal Government that relied upon the Irish Parliamentary Party for a majority. The recently merged Unionist Party was the official opposition. The Labour Party was the fourth party and generally voted with the Liberals in parliament.

== London Council background ==
The Municipal Reform party had been in power since winning a majority back in 1907. It was now seeking its third consecutive mandate.

== Candidates ==
All constituencies were contested. The governing Municipal Reform Party ran a full slate of 118 candidates. The opposition Progressive Party ran 110 candidates. They ran candidates everywhere except the City of London where they ran three candidates, Hampstead, St George's Hanover Square and Strand where only one candidate stood, three constituencies where one candidate ran in tandem with Labour and Woolwich where they did not oppose a Labour pair. Four Independents also ran.

=== Labour Party ===
By 1913, all Labour Party members had withdrawn from the Progressive Party and at these elections stood under their own party label. The party fielded ten candidates, three of these candidates ran in tandem with Progressive candidates, a further two candidates were not opposed by Progressives. The other five all stood in opposition to Progressive candidates. The Labour Party in London had no elected or otherwise recognised Leader.

=== British Socialist Party ===
The British Socialist Party had been formed in 1911 from the merger of a few socialist groups with the Social Democratic Federation. As with the SDF, the BSP was opposed to socialists having electoral pacts with Liberals and they were critical of Labour Party branches for working with the Progressives in London. The BSP put forward dual candidates in three constituencies, all constituencies where both the Progressives and Municipal Reform parties were running dual candidates. Nowhere did they run against a Labour candidate.

== Outcome ==
The Municipal Reform Party was returned with its third successive majority, slightly larger than the old one. However, its leader, Cyril Jackson was unseated by the Progressives at Limehouse. When the new council met, the ruling Municipal Reform majority was forced to use one of their Aldermanic nominations to put Jackson back on the council. Although the Progressives lost ground, they comfortably retained their position as main challengers to the Municipal Reformers in those seats where socialists stood. All socialist candidates (BSP and Labour) who stood against Progressive candidates finished bottom of the poll. Of the three Labour candidates running in tandem with a Progressive, all polled less than the Progressive and two of the three failed to join their Progressive running mate in victory. In Woolwich, where the Labour candidates were given a free run against the Municipal Reform pair, they also lost.

== Constituency results ==
- Incumbent Councillors shown in bold.

=== Battersea and Clapham ===
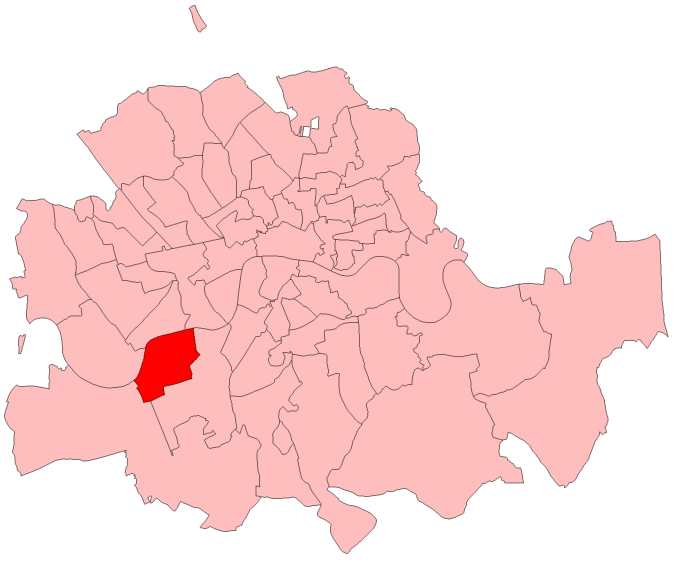
Battersea

Battersea
Party	Candidate	Votes	%	±%
Progressive	**Walter Richard Warren**	5,483	27.5	+1.9
Progressive	**William J. West**	5,451	27.3	+1.0
Municipal Reform	H Ramsden	4,502	22.6	−2.2
Municipal Reform	George Bettesworth Piggott	4,502	22.6	−0.8
Majority		949	4.7	+3.9
Progressive **hold**		Swing	+2.0	

Montefiore

Clapham
Party	Candidate	Votes	%	±%
Municipal Reform	**Robert Montefiore Sebag-Montefiore**	8,890	28.0	−2.3
Municipal Reform	Herbert James Francis Parsons	8,881	27.9	−2.7
Progressive	Hubert George Beaumont	7,049	22.2	+2.7
Progressive	Oswald Partington	6,971	21.9	+2.4
Majority		1,832	5.7	
Municipal Reform **hold**		Swing	-2.5	

=== Bethnal Green ===
Smith

Bethnal Green North East
Party	Candidate	Votes	%	±%
Progressive	**Garnham Edmonds**	2,731	29.4	−7.2
Progressive	**Edward Smith**	2,667	28.7	−7.4
Municipal Reform	G. Allen	1,961	21.1	+6.9
Municipal Reform	Thomas Andrew Blane	1,941	20.9	+7.8
Majority		706	7.6	−14.3
Progressive **hold**		Swing	-7.1	

Headlam

Bethnal Green South West
Party	Candidate	Votes	%	±%
Progressive	**Stewart Duckworth Headlam**	2,369	30.9	+1.9
Progressive	**Percy Alfred Harris**	2,359	30.8	+2.6
Municipal Reform	Malcolm Campbell-Johnston	1,487	19.4	−2.8
Municipal Reform	L Tyfield	1,441	18.8	−1.7
Majority		872	11.4	+5.4
Progressive **hold**		Swing	+2.7	

=== Camberwell ===
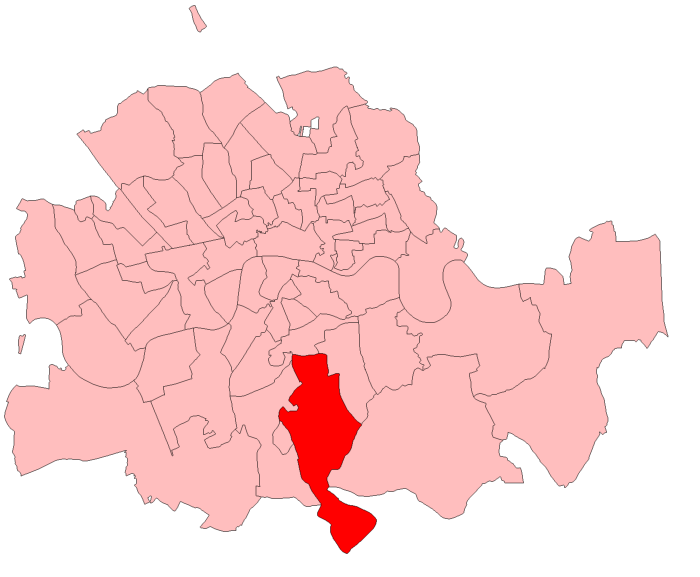
Dulwich

Dulwich
Party	Candidate	Votes	%	±%
**Municipal Reform**	**Viscount Massereene**	**6,048**	**30.1**	**0.0**
**Municipal Reform**	**Cuthbert Wilkinson**	**6,027**	**29.9**	**0.0**
Progressive	Percy Phipps	4,057	20.2	+0.2
Progressive	Dr Sophia Jevons	3,993	19.8	−0.2
Majority		1,970	9.7	−0.2
Municipal Reform **hold**		Swing	-0.1	

Taylor

Camberwell North
Party	Candidate	Votes	%	±%
Progressive	**Reginald Bray**	4,358	28.2	−2.9
Progressive	**Henry Robert Taylor**	4,303	27.8	−3.1
Municipal Reform	William Alfred Hirst	3,423	22.1	+2.9
Municipal Reform	H. A. Truby	3,374	21.8	+3.0
Majority		880	5.7	−6.0
Progressive **hold**		Swing	-3.0	

Dowton

Peckham
Party	Candidate	Votes	%	±%
Progressive	**Thomas Gautrey**	5,306	25.6	−2.4
Progressive	**Earl of Haddo**	5,206	25.1	−1.1
Municipal Reform	William Leonard Dowton	5,127	24.7	+1.4
Municipal Reform	T Richards	5,092	24.5	+2.1
Majority		79	0.4	−2.5
Progressive **hold**		Swing	-1.2	

=== Chelsea ===
Norman

Chelsea
Party	Candidate	Votes	%	±%
Municipal Reform	**Ronald Collet Norman**	5,200	33.6	+1.5
Municipal Reform	**Ernest Louis Meinertzhagen**	5,113	33.0	+1.3
Progressive	Katherine Talbot Wallas	2,598	16.8	−1.4
Progressive	George Ernest Schuster	2,569	16.6	−1.4
Majority		2,515	16.2	+2.7
Municipal Reform **hold**		Swing	+1.4	

=== City of London ===
Hemphill

City of London
Party	Candidate	Votes	%	±%
Municipal Reform	**James William Domoney**	7,321	21.5	+0.6
Municipal Reform	**Gilbert Johnstone**	7,279	21.4	+0.4
Municipal Reform	**William Henry Pannell**	7,245	21.2	+0.4
Municipal Reform	**Herbert Stuart Sankey**	7,206	21.2	+0.3
Progressive	Fitzroy Hemphill	1,708	5.0	−0.6
Progressive	Constantine Scaramanga-Ralli	1,647	4.8	−0.8
Progressive	Stephen Miall	1,644	4.8	−0.6
Majority		5,498	16.2	+1.0
Municipal Reform **hold**		Swing		

=== Deptford ===
Phillimore

Deptford
Party	Candidate	Votes	%	±%
**Municipal Reform**	**John Theodore Prestige**	**5,704**	**25.3**	**−3.3**
**Progressive**	**Robert Charles Phillimore**	**5,667**	**25.1**	**+1.5**
Municipal Reform	Thomas Malcolm Harvey Kincaid-Smith	5,643	25.0	+0.7
Labour	Charles Mostyn Lloyd	5,532	24.5	+1.0
Majority		172	0.8	−4.3
Municipal Reform **hold**		Swing	-2.2	
Majority		24	0.1	0.8
Progressive **gain** from Municipal Reform		Swing	+0.4	

=== Finsbury ===
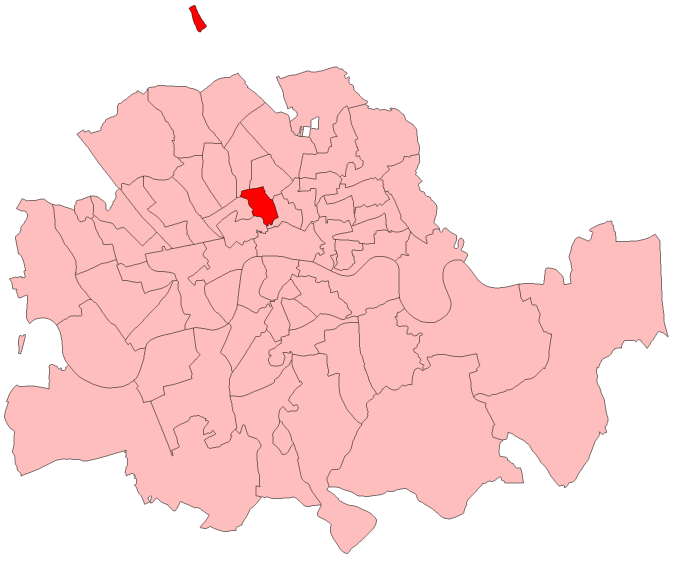
Finsbury Central

Finsbury Central
Party	Candidate	Votes	%	±%
Municipal Reform	**Lawrence William Simpson Rostron**	3,006	25.6	+0.5
Municipal Reform	**Samuel Joyce Thomas**	2,947	25.1	+0.5
Progressive	Arthur Barnett Russell	2,929	25.0	−0.3
Progressive	Herbert Sutton Syrett	2,853	24.3	−0.7
Majority		18	0.1	
Municipal Reform **hold**		Swing	+0.6	
Municipal Reform **gain** from Progressive		Swing	+0.4	

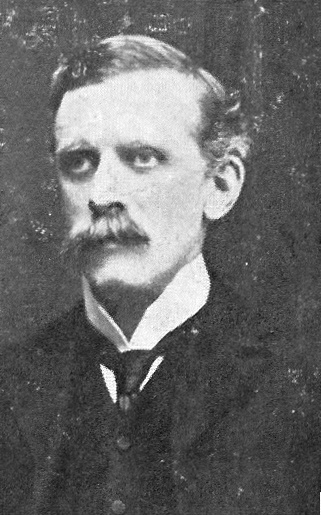
Cotton

Finsbury East
Party	Candidate	Votes	%	±%
Progressive	**George Masterman Gillett**	2,037	26.2	−1.6
Progressive	**Henry Evan Auguste Cotton**	2,026	26.1	−1.8
Municipal Reform	Eustace Widdrington Morrison-Bell	1,866	24.0	+1.7
Municipal Reform	William George Perring	1,837	23.7	+1.8
Majority		160	2.1	−3.4
Progressive **hold**		Swing	-1.7	
Progressive **hold**		Swing	-1.8	

Lygon

Holborn
Party	Candidate	Votes	%	±%
Municipal Reform	**Robert Inigo Tasker**	3,719	37.3	+2.5
Municipal Reform	**Henry Lygon**	3,718	37.3	+2.3
Progressive	T. E. Morris	1,287	12.9	−2.3
Progressive	John Pascoe Elsden	1,255	12.6	−2.4
Majority		2,431	24.4	+4.8
Municipal Reform **hold**		Swing	-2.3	
Municipal Reform **hold**		Swing	-2.5	

=== Fulham ===
Waterlow

Fulham
Party	Candidate	Votes	%	±%
Municipal Reform	**Cyril Stephen Cobb**	7,649	30.6	+0.5
Municipal Reform	**Edward George Easton**	7,614	30.5	+0.7
Progressive	David Sydney Waterlow	4,870	19.5	−0.8
Progressive	Walter Meakin	4,843	19.4	−0.4
Majority		2,744	11.0	+1.5
Municipal Reform **hold**		Swing	+0.7	
Municipal Reform **hold**		Swing	+0.5	

=== Greenwich ===
Hume

Greenwich
Party	Candidate	Votes	%	±%
Municipal Reform	**George Hopwood Hume**	4,815	26.0	−2.6
Municipal Reform	**Lord Hill**	4,787	25.8	−2.8
Progressive	Alfred Henry Scott	4,486	24.2	+6.9
Progressive	Hugh Lawrence Fletcher Moulton	4,463	24.1	+6.8
Majority		301	1.6	
Municipal Reform **hold**		Swing	-4.8	

- One Labour Party candidate withdrew

=== Hackney ===
Adler

Hackney Central
Party	Candidate	Votes	%	±%
Municipal Reform	William Ray	3,670	25.2	+1.7
Progressive	**Henrietta Adler**	3,653	25.0	−1.2
Municipal Reform	Lord William Cecil	3,645	25.0	+2.2
Progressive	**Alfred James Shepheard**	3,622	24.8	−2.7
Majority		8	0.0	
Progressive **hold**		Swing	-1.7	
Municipal Reform **gain** from Progressive		Swing	+2.2	

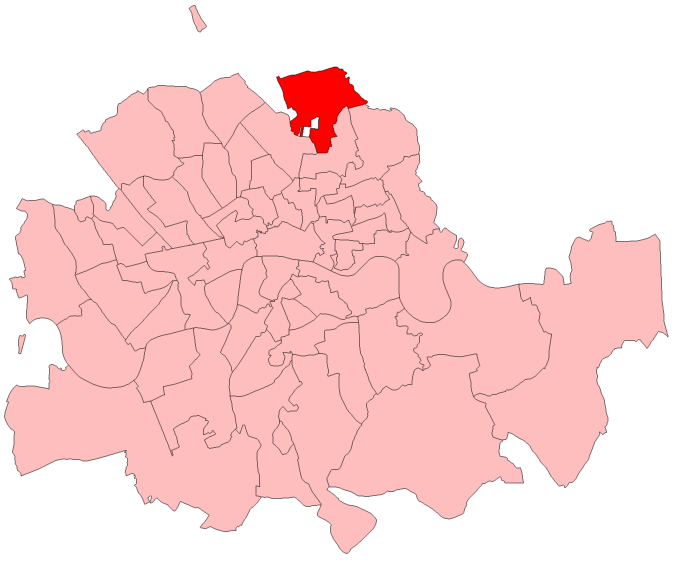
Hackney North

Hackney North
Party	Candidate	Votes	%	±%
Municipal Reform	**George William Henry Jones**	6,014	26.6	−1.8
Municipal Reform	**Oscar Emanuel Warburg**	5,965	26.4	−1.5
Progressive	William Ashley Nicholls	5,322	23.5	+1.6
Progressive	W. B. J. Hickman	5,299	23.4	+1.6
Majority		643	2.9	
Municipal Reform **hold**		Swing	-1.6	

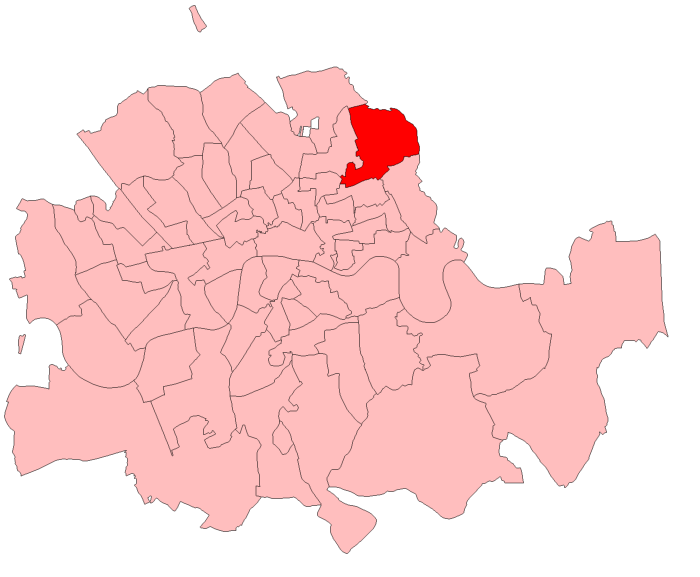
Hackney South

Hackney South
Party	Candidate	Votes	%	±%
Municipal Reform	**George King Naylor**	3,132	25.5	+7.2
Progressive	**Theodore Chapman**	3,109	25.3	−6.7
Municipal Reform	James Ernest Brudenell-Bruce	3,059	24.9	+6.7
Progressive	C. Watson	2,981	24.3	−7.2
Majority		50	0.4	−12.8
Municipal Reform **gain** from Progressive		Swing	+7.2	
Progressive **hold**		Swing	+6.7	

=== Hammersmith ===
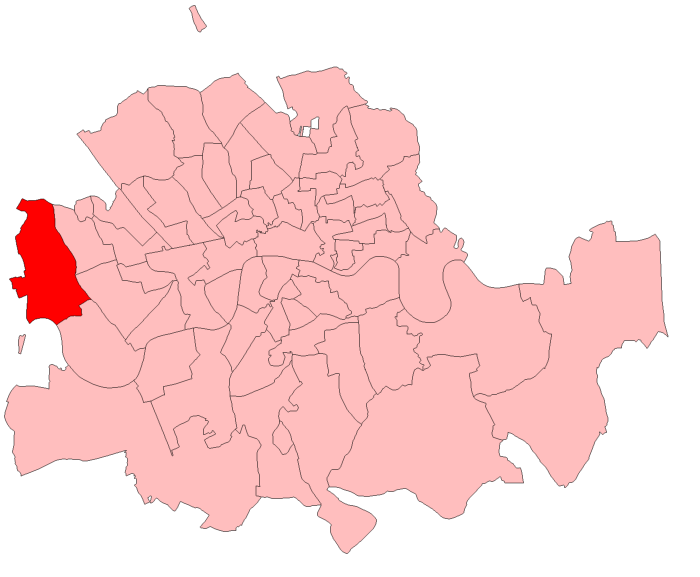
Hammersmith

Hammersmith
Party	Candidate	Votes	%	±%
Municipal Reform	**Francis Robert Ince Anderton**	5,615	29.8	−3.7
Municipal Reform	**Isidore Salmon**	5,609	29.7	−2.9
Progressive	W. P. Hunter	3,937	20.9	+3.9
Progressive	Glynne Williams	3,703	19.6	+2.7
Majority		1,672	8.9	
Municipal Reform **hold**		Swing	-3.3	

=== Hampstead ===
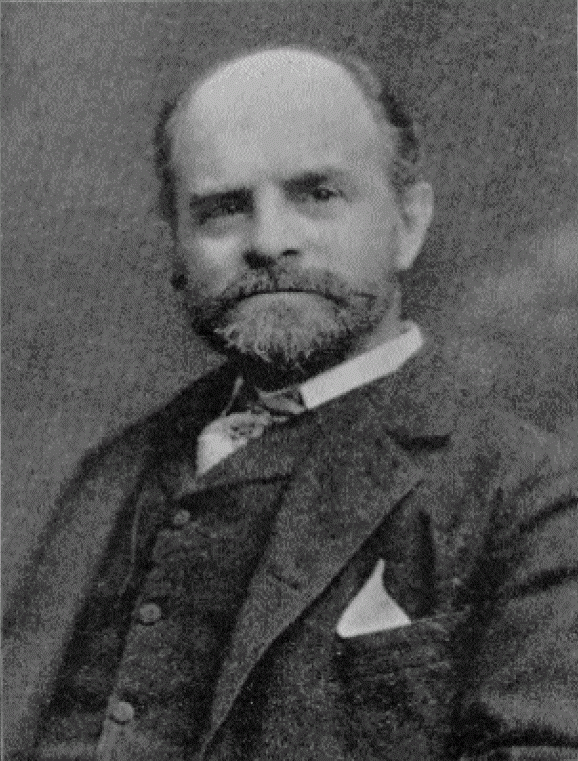
Taylor

Hampstead
Party	Candidate	Votes	%	±%
Municipal Reform	**Walter Reynolds**	4,567	40.5	+1.0
Municipal Reform	**Andrew Thomas Taylor**	4,529	40.2	+0.9
Progressive	Henry Holman	2,169	19.3	−1.9
Majority		2,360	20.9	+2.8
Municipal Reform **hold**		Swing	+1.0	

=== Islington ===
Smallwood

Islington East
Party	Candidate	Votes	%	±%
Progressive	**Edward Smallwood**	4,545	26.1	−0.1
Progressive	**William Lace Clague**	4,453	25.6	−0.1
Municipal Reform	David Hazel	4,226	24.3	+0.1
Municipal Reform	John Foster Vesey-FitzGerald	4,170	24.0	0.0
Majority		227	1.3	−0.2
Progressive **hold**		Swing	-0.1	

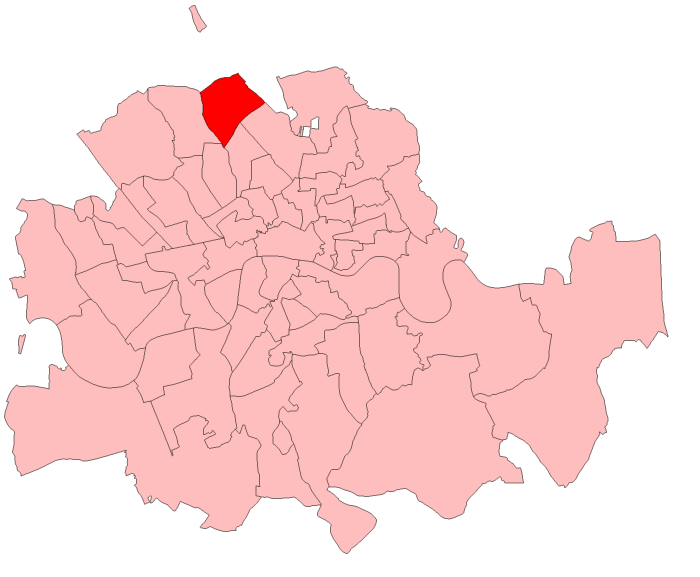
Islington North

Islington North
Party	Candidate	Votes	%	±%
Municipal Reform	**Frederick Lionel Dove**	4,796	25.6	−1.4
Municipal Reform	**Richard Joshua Cooper**	4,792	25.6	−1.5
Progressive	J. H. Torrance	4,574	24.4	+1.4
Progressive	Henry Scipio Reitlinger	4,549	24.3	+1.5
Majority		228	1.2	
Municipal Reform **hold**		Swing	-1.5	

Williams

Islington South
Party	Candidate	Votes	%	±%
Progressive	**George Dew**	3,197	26.6	+0.0
Progressive	**Howell Jones Williams**	3,195	26.6	−0.1
Municipal Reform	A Dingli	2,829	23.5	+0.0
Municipal Reform	William Hunt	2,807	23.3	+0.1
Majority		366	3.0	
Progressive **hold**		Swing	-0.0	

Jephson

Islington West
Party	Candidate	Votes	%	±%
Progressive	**Henry Mills**	2,999	27.9	+0.0
Progressive	**Henry Lorenzo Jephson**	2,978	27.7	+0.0
Municipal Reform	C. W. French	2,412	22.4	+0.2
Municipal Reform	Harold Frazer Wyatt	2,372	22.0	−0.1
Majority		566	5.3	−0.2
Progressive **hold**		Swing	-0.1	

=== Kensington ===
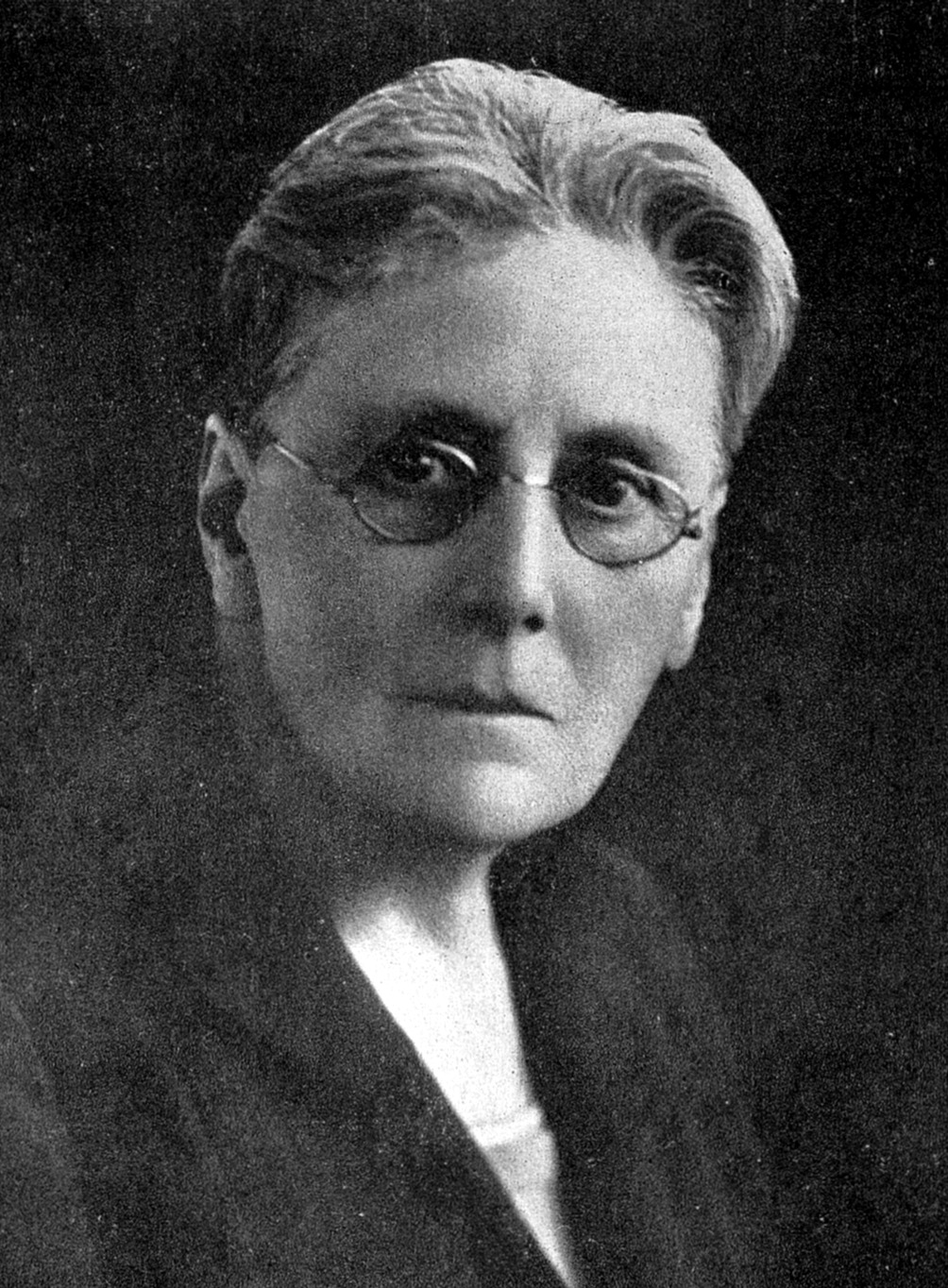
Bentham

Kensington North
Party	Candidate	Votes	%	±%
Municipal Reform	**David Davis**	4,025	29.0	+0.5
Municipal Reform	**Cecil Bingham Levita**	3,999	28.9	+0.7
Progressive	C D'O Cooper	1,895	13.7	−9.0
Progressive	G S Warren	1,844	13.3	−9.4
Labour	Ethel Bentham	1,099	7.9	−12.8
Labour	William Joseph Jarrett	998	7.2	−13.3
Majority		2,104	15.2	+9.7
Municipal Reform **hold**		Swing		
Municipal Reform **hold**		Swing		

- One Progressive and one Labour candidate intervene

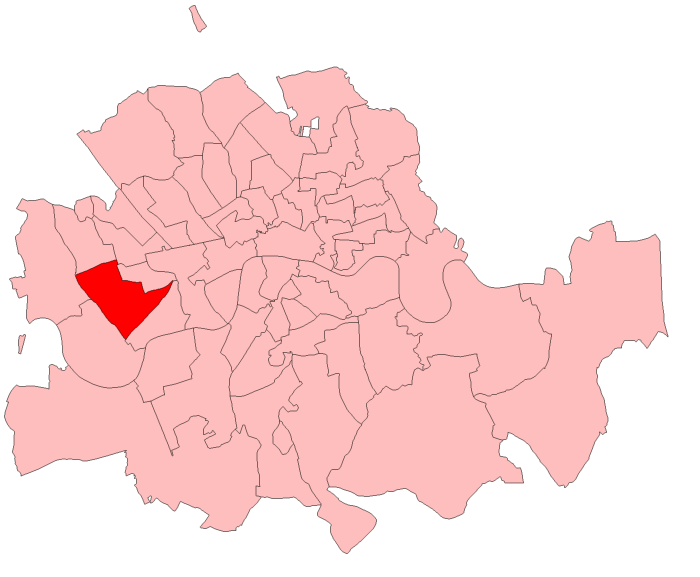
Kensington South

Kensington South
Party	Candidate	Votes	%	±%
Municipal Reform	**William Frederick Cavaye**	5,072	44.1	−0.9
Municipal Reform	Augustus Gilbert Colvile	4,997	43.4	−1.1
Progressive	F C Jarvis	731	6.3	+1.0
Progressive	Harry Christopher Bickmore	713	6.2	+1.1
Majority		4,266	37.1	−2.1
Municipal Reform **hold**		Swing	-1.0	
Municipal Reform **hold**		Swing	-1.0	

=== Lambeth ===
Gray

Brixton
Party	Candidate	Votes	%	±%
Municipal Reform	**William Haydon**	4,289	28.8	−0.0
Municipal Reform	**Ernest Gray**	4,274	28.7	+0.1
Progressive	A. R. Gridley	3,154	21.2	−0.1
Progressive	Hillier Holt	3,151	21.2	−0.0
Majority		1,120	7.5	
Municipal Reform **hold**		Swing	0.0	
Municipal Reform **hold**		Swing	+0.5	

Benn

Kennington
Party	Candidate	Votes	%	±%
Progressive	**Sir John Williams Benn**	3,517	24.9	−3.1
Municipal Reform	**Lord Peel**	3,371	23.8	+3.2
Municipal Reform	Ellice Victor Sassoon	3,264	23.1	+3.4
Progressive	W J Richardson	2,878	20.3	−3.8
Labour	John Gilbert Dale	1,121	7.9	+0.2
Municipal Reform **gain** from Progressive		Swing	+3.5	
Majority		493	3.5	
Progressive **hold**		Swing	-3.2	
Majority		253	1.8	

Lambeth North
Party	Candidate	Votes	%	±%
Progressive	**Frank Briant**	2,370	27.5	−1.8
Municipal Reform	**Louis Courtauld**	2,118	24.5	+1.5
Municipal Reform	William Gough-Cook	2,105	24.4	+1.7
Labour	Francis Samuel Smith	2,037	23.6	−1.4
Majority		13	0.1	
Progressive **hold**		Swing	-1.7	
Municipal Reform **gain** from Labour		Swing	+1.5	

Morrow

Norwood
Party	Candidate	Votes	%	±%
Municipal Reform	**Cecil Urquhart Fisher**	6,047	31.5	+1.1
Municipal Reform	**Forbes St John Morrow**	6,006	31.3	+1.1
Progressive	Sir Charles James Tarring	3,559	18.6	−1.5
Progressive	A E Bennetts	3,553	18.5	−0.8
Majority		2,447	12.8	+2.7
Municipal Reform **hold**		Swing	+1.3	
Municipal Reform **hold**		Swing	+1.0	

=== Lewisham ===
Bellairs

Lewisham
Party	Candidate	Votes	%	±%
Municipal Reform	**Frederick Houston Carter**	9,497	31.1	−4.7
Municipal Reform	**Carlyon Wilfroy Bellairs**	9,410	30.8	−4.7
Progressive	Charles Garfitt	5,865	19.2	−0.4
Progressive	J S Lewis	5,809	19.0	+9.9
Majority		3,545	11.6	−4.3
Municipal Reform **hold**		Swing	-2.2	
Municipal Reform **hold**		Swing	-7.3	

=== Marylebone ===
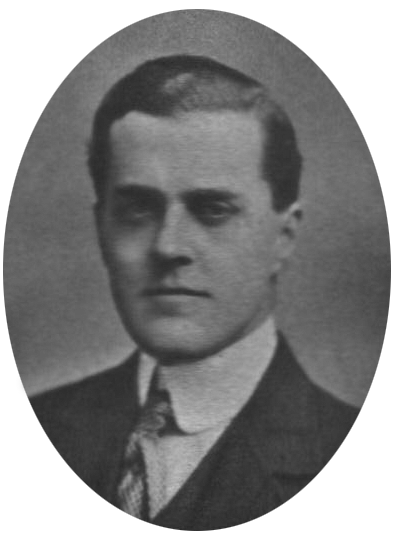
Thynne

Marylebone East
Party	Candidate	Votes	%	±%
Municipal Reform	**Ernest Ridley Debenham**	3,492	38.7	+1.5
Municipal Reform	**Lord Alexander George Boteville Thynne**	3,411	37.8	+1.0
Progressive	Thomas W. McCormack	1,056	11.7	−1.6
Progressive	Hilda Caroline Miall-Smith	1,055	11.7	−1.0
Majority		2,355	26.1	+2.5
Municipal Reform **hold**		Swing	+1.5	
Municipal Reform **hold**		Swing	+1.0	

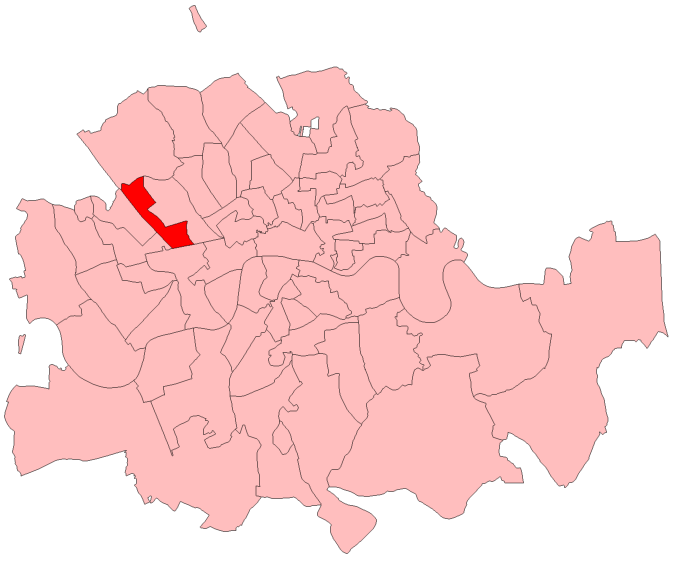
Marylebone West

Marylebone West
Party	Candidate	Votes	%	±%
Municipal Reform	**Lord Greville**	4,010	33.1	−3.2
Municipal Reform	**Sir Edward White**	3,942	32.5	−4.1
Progressive	Evelyn Emily Marian Fox	2,110	17.4	+3.8
Progressive	Charles James Vasey	2,066	17.0	+3.6
Majority		1,832	15.1	−7.6
Municipal Reform **hold**		Swing	-3.4	
Municipal Reform **hold**		Swing	-4.0	

=== Newington ===
Dawes

Walworth
Party	Candidate	Votes	%	±%
Progressive	**James Arthur Dawes**	2,575		
Progressive	**Cornelius Charles Jesson**	2,476		
Municipal Reform	Frederick Bird	2,199		
Municipal Reform	G. Aspinall	2,114		
Majority				
Progressive **hold**		Swing		
Progressive **hold**		Swing		

Newington West
Party	Candidate	Votes	%	±%
Progressive	**James Daniel Gilbert**	3,161		
Progressive	**Evan Spicer**	3,097		
Municipal Reform	Edgar Abbott	2,268		
Municipal Reform	Richard Owen Roberts	2,222		
Majority				
Progressive **hold**		Swing		
Progressive **hold**		Swing		

=== Paddington ===
Paddington North
Party	Candidate	Votes	%	±%
Municipal Reform	**John Herbert Hunter**	4,561		
Municipal Reform	**John Herbert Lidiard**	4,522		
Progressive	Horace Holmes	3,573		
Progressive	James Scott Duckers	3,485		
Majority		949		
Municipal Reform **hold**		Swing		
Municipal Reform **hold**		Swing		

Paddington South
Party	Candidate	Votes	%	±%
Municipal Reform	**John Burgess-Preston Karslake**	3,353		
Municipal Reform	**Harry Barned Lewis-Barned**	3,316		
Progressive	Reymond Hervey de Montmorency	817		
Progressive	Alfred Young Mayell	805		
Majority		2,499		
Municipal Reform **hold**		Swing		
Municipal Reform **hold**		Swing		

=== St George's Hanover Square ===
Cheylesmore

St George's Hanover Square
Party	Candidate	Votes	%	±%
Municipal Reform	**Lord Cheylesmore**	4,335		
Municipal Reform	**Hubert John Greenwood**	4,279		
Progressive	Henry Thomas Mackenzie Bell	821		
Majority				
Municipal Reform **hold**		Swing		
Municipal Reform **hold**		Swing		

=== St Pancras ===
St. Pancras East
Party	Candidate	Votes	%	±%
Progressive	**Albert William Claremont**	2,549		
Progressive	**Henry de Rosenbach Walker**	2,522		
Municipal Reform	W Clark-Smith	2,454		
Municipal Reform	J Hewson	2,436		
Majority		68		
Progressive **hold**		Swing		
Progressive **hold**		Swing		

St. Pancras North
Party	Candidate	Votes	%	±%
Progressive	**Thomas Frederick Hobson**	2,901		
Progressive	**Arthur Lewis Leon**	2,887		
Municipal Reform	Conrad Hugh Dinwiddy	2,654		
Municipal Reform	Edward Gunter Jones	2,646		
British Socialist Party	A C Edwards	514		
British Socialist Party	W G Woodley	501		
Majority				
Progressive **hold**		Swing		
Progressive **hold**		Swing		

St. Pancras South
Party	Candidate	Votes	%	±%
Municipal Reform	**David Davies**	2,360		
Municipal Reform	**John Cuthbert Denison-Pender**	2,307		
Progressive	George Frederick Cosburn	1,353		
Progressive	Thomas Charles	1,307		
Majority				
Municipal Reform **hold**		Swing		
Municipal Reform **hold**		Swing		

St. Pancras West
Party	Candidate	Votes	%	±%
**Municipal Reform**	**Auberon Claud Hegan Kennard**	**3,278**		
**Municipal Reform**	**Lord Windsor**	**3,252**		
Progressive	**William Lloyd Taylor**	2,672		
Progressive	Arthur George Rickards	2,579		
Majority				
Municipal Reform **gain** from Progressive		Swing		
Municipal Reform **gain** from Progressive		Swing		

=== Shoreditch ===
Haggerston
Party	Candidate	Votes	%	±%
Progressive	**Henry Ward**	2,178		
Progressive	**David Blackley**	2,167		
Municipal Reform	Joseph John Jarvis	1,975		
Municipal Reform	William Brass	1,970		
Majority				
Progressive **hold**		Swing		
Progressive **hold**		Swing		

Hoxton
Party	Candidate	Votes	%	±%
Progressive	**Joseph Stanley Holmes**	2,749		
Progressive	**Oswald Lewis**	2,693		
Municipal Reform	Henry Busby Bird	2,402		
Municipal Reform	C. Filby	2,279		
Independent Municipal Reform	Miss Willoughby	158		
Majority				
Progressive **hold**		Swing		
Progressive **hold**		Swing		

=== Southwark ===
Bermondsey
Party	Candidate	Votes	%	±%
Progressive	**William Henry Ecroyd**	2,951		
Progressive	**Montague Shearman**	2,820		
Municipal Reform	Ald. Stickland	2,462		
Municipal Reform	John Swiney	2,409		
Labour	Alfred Salter	1,632		
Labour	Charles George Ammon	1,374		
Majority				
Progressive **hold**		Swing		
Progressive **hold**		Swing		

Rotherhithe
Party	Candidate	Votes	%	±%
Progressive	**Robert Leishman Stuart**	3,186		
Progressive	**John Scott Lidgett**	3,159		
Municipal Reform	W. G. Marriott	2,662		
Municipal Reform	D. Radcliffe	2,457		
Majority				
Progressive **hold**		Swing		
Progressive **hold**		Swing		

Southwark West
Party	Candidate	Votes	%	±%
Progressive	**Albert Wilson**	2,642		
Progressive	**Thomas Hunter**	2,831		
Municipal Reform	H Edwards	2,105		
Municipal Reform	Rev. Walter T Somerville	2,070		
Majority		726		
Progressive **hold**		Swing		
Progressive **hold**		Swing		

=== Strand ===
Pilditch

Strand
Party	Candidate	Votes	%	±%
Municipal Reform	**Clifford Probyn**	3,109		
Municipal Reform	**Philip Edward Pilditch**	3,065		
Progressive	Miss Ellen Pocock	793		
Majority		2,272		
Municipal Reform **hold**		Swing		
Municipal Reform **hold**		Swing		

=== Tower Hamlets ===
Bow and Bromley
Party	Candidate	Votes	%	±%
**Municipal Reform**	**Frank Herbert John Baber**	**2,505**		
**Municipal Reform**	**George Malcolm Hilbery**	**2,464**		
Progressive	George Lewis Bruce	1,936		
Progressive	Ben Cooper	1,826		
British Socialist Party	Charlie Sumner	1,794		
British Socialist Party	Edwin C. Fairchild	1,609		
Independent	Frederick John William Leaney	79		
Majority				
Municipal Reform **gain** from Labour		Swing		
Municipal Reform **gain** from Progressive		Swing		

Yeo

Limehouse
Party	Candidate	Votes	%	±%
Progressive	**Benjamin B Evans**	2,665		
Progressive	**Alfred William Yeo**	2,664		
Municipal Reform	**Cyril Jackson**	2,024		
Municipal Reform	R A Reith	1,916		
Majority		640		
Progressive **hold**		Swing		
Progressive **gain** from Municipal Reform		Swing		

Mile End
Party	Candidate	Votes	%	±%
Progressive	**Thomas William Wickham**	2,252		
Progressive	**Carl Stettauer**	2,204		
Municipal Reform	Edward Holton Coumbe	1,973		
Municipal Reform	Cecil Ince	1,924		
Majority				
Progressive **hold**		Swing		
Progressive **hold**		Swing		

Poplar
Party	Candidate	Votes	%	±%
**Progressive**	**St John Hutchinson**	**3,061**		
**Labour**	**Arabella Susan Lawrence**	**2,960**		
Municipal Reform	T Vosper	1,599		
Municipal Reform	**Mrs Elliott**	1,492		
Majority		1,361		
Labour **hold**		Swing		
Majority		1,462		
Progressive **hold**		Swing		

Gosling

St George's in the East
Party	Candidate	Votes	%	±%
Progressive	**Harry Gosling**	1,246		
Progressive	**Charles James Mathew**	1,209		
Municipal Reform	Dr P Daniel	961		
Municipal Reform	D Knocker	929		
Independent	J Dibbs	164		
Independent	Frederick Wallace Brame	24		
Majority				
Progressive **hold**		Swing		
Progressive **hold**		Swing		

Hardy

Stepney
Party	Candidate	Votes	%	±%
Municipal Reform	**Alfred Ordway Goodrich**	1,827		
Municipal Reform	**Arthur Claud Spencer Chichester**	1,805		
Progressive	J S Henry	1,667		
Progressive	George Alexander Hardy	1,630		
British Socialist Party	Joseph George Butler	108		
British Socialist Party	Alfred Augustus Watts	105		
Majority				
Municipal Reform **hold**		Swing		
Municipal Reform **hold**		Swing		

Johnson

Whitechapel
Party	Candidate	Votes	%	±%
Progressive	**Henry Herman Gordon**	1,746		
Progressive	**William Cowlishaw Johnson**	1,792		
Municipal Reform	Rev E G Parry	1,008		
Municipal Reform	A Ludski	916		
Majority		738		
Progressive **hold**		Swing		
Progressive **hold**		Swing		

=== Wandsworth ===
Wandsworth
Party	Candidate	Votes	%	±%
**Municipal Reform**	**Edwin Evans**	**13,927**		
**Municipal Reform**	**Alfred Cooper Rawson**	**13,804**		
Progressive	George Pearce Blizard	7,390		
Progressive	C H Williams	7,357		
Majority				
Municipal Reform **hold**		Swing		
Municipal Reform **hold**		Swing		

=== Westminster ===
Westminster
Party	Candidate	Votes	%	±%
Municipal Reform	**Reginald White Granville-Smith**	3,310		
Municipal Reform	**Percy George Gates**	3,228		
Progressive	Mabel Annie St Clair Stobart	1,199		
Progressive	Lionel Gurney Buxton	1,168		
Majority				
Municipal Reform **hold**		Swing		
Municipal Reform **hold**		Swing		

=== Woolwich ===
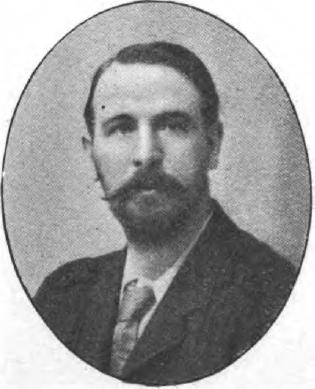
Sanders

Woolwich
Party	Candidate	Votes	%	±%
Municipal Reform	**William James Squires**	8,378		
Municipal Reform	Howard Kingsley Wood	8,300		
Labour	William Stephen Sanders	7,618		
Labour	Margaret Grace Bondfield	7,598		
Majority		682		
Municipal Reform **hold**		Swing		
Municipal Reform **hold**		Swing		

== Aldermen ==
In addition to the 124 councillors the council consisted of 20 county aldermen. Aldermen were elected by the council, and served a six-year term. Half of the aldermanic bench were elected every three years following the triennial council election. After the elections, there were ten aldermanic vacancies and the following alderman were appointed by the newly elected council on 13 March 1913;

To serve until 1919:

- Viscount Chelmsford, Municipal Reform. Had previously sat as a councillor in 1904–1905.
- Rt. Hon. Sir George Dashwood Taubman Goldie, Municipal Reform. Had previously sat as a councillor in 1907–1912.
- George Alexander Hardy, Progressive. Had previously sat as a councillor in 1901–1907.
- William Hunt, Municipal Reform, outgoing councillor for Wandsworth, had unsuccessfully contested Islington South.
- Cyril Jackson, Municipal Reform, outgoing councillor for Limehouse.
- Oswald Partington, Progressive
- Sir Herbert James Francis Parsons, Municipal Reform, reappointed.
- Mrs. Jessie Wilton Phipps, Municipal Reform
- Alfred Henry Scott, Progressive

To serve until 1916:

- Katherine Talbot Wallas, Progressive, in place of Henry Lawrence Cripps, resigned 4 February 1913

== By-elections 1913–1915 ==
There were eight by-elections to fill casual vacancies during the term of the ninth London County Council.

=== City of London, 9 May 1913 ===
- Cause: resignation of Colonel Sir Stuart Sankey 29 April 1919

London County Council by-election, 1913: City of London
Party	Candidate	Votes	%	±%
Municipal Reform	William Wilson Grantham	Unopposed	N/A	N/A
Municipal Reform hold		Swing	N/A	

=== Tower Hamlets, Mile End, 13 August 1913 ===
- Cause: death of Carl Stettauer, 24 July 1913

London County Council by-election, 1913: Mile End
Party	Candidate	Votes	%	±%
Municipal Reform	George A Dutfield	1,743	51.7	
Progressive	Hugh Lawrence Fletcher Moulton	1,627	48.3	
Majority		116	3.4	
Municipal Reform gain from Progressive		Swing		

=== Islington West, 21 February 1914 ===
- Cause: death of Henry Lorenzo Jephson 31 January 1914

London County Council by-election, 1914: Islington West
Party	Candidate	Votes	%	±%
Progressive	W A Nicholls	Unopposed	N/A	N/A
Progressive hold		Swing	N/A	

=== Marylebone West, 6 July 1914 ===
- Cause: death of Sir Edward White 14 June 1914

London County Council by-election, 1914: Marylebone West
Party	Candidate	Votes	%	±%
Municipal Reform	Eustace Widdrington Morrison-Bell	Unopposed	N/A	N/A
Municipal Reform hold		Swing	N/A	

=== Finsbury, Holborn, 9 November 1914 ===
- Cause: resignation of Robert Inigo Tasker 27 October 1914 on mobilisation of the 11th Battalion, London Regiment

London County Council by-election, 1914: Holborn
Party	Candidate	Votes	%	±%
Municipal Reform	Henry Hugh Tasker	Unopposed	N/A	N/A
Municipal Reform hold		Swing	N/A	

=== Tower Hamlets, Limehouse, 14 January 1915 ===
- Cause: resignation of Benjamin B Evans due to ill health 15 December 1914

London County Council by-election, 1915: Limehouse
Party	Candidate	Votes	%	±%
Progressive	Henry Marks	Unopposed	N/A	N/A
Progressive hold		Swing	N/A	

=== City of London, 1 March 1915 ===
- Cause: resignation of William Henry Pannell due to ill health 9 February 1915

London County Council by-election, 1915: City of London
Party	Candidate	Votes	%	±%
Municipal Reform	Charles Augustin Hanson	Unopposed	N/A	N/A
Municipal Reform hold		Swing	N/A	

=== Lewisham, 8 May 1915 ===
- Cause: resignation of Carlyon Wilfroy Bellairs 27 April 1915

London County Council by-election, 1915: Lewisham
Party	Candidate	Votes	%	±%
Municipal Reform	William Henry Le May	Unopposed	N/A	N/A
Municipal Reform hold		Swing	N/A	

== Appointments to vacant seats 1915–1919 ==
Under the Elections and Registration Act 1915, a wartime piece of legislation that cancelled local elections until the end of the conflict (and thus the county council election due to be held in March 1916), the members of the county council were given the power to appoint or co-opt councillors to fill vacant seats. The legislation remained in force for the rest of the eleventh county council's existence.

Date of appointment	Division	Outgoing member	New member appointed	Party
7 December 1915	Battersea & Clapham, Clapham	Robert Montefiore Sebag-Montefiore (died 19 November 1915)	William Henry Peruzzi Gibson	Municipal Reform
21 December 1915	Tower Hamlets, Stepney	Arthur Claud Chichester (resigned 7 December 1915 on entering active service with the army)	David Hazel	Municipal Reform
4 April 1916	Lewisham	William Henry Le May (resigned 21 March 1916)	Robert Jackson	Municipal Reform
30 May 1916	Finsbury Central	Lawrence William Simpson Rostron (died 14 May 1916)	James Little	Municipal Reform
30 May 1916	Marylebone West	Lord Greville (resigned 16 May 1916)	Ernest Sanger	Municipal Reform
31 October 1916	Fulham	Edward George Easton (died 2 August 1916)	Henry George Norris	Municipal Reform
31 October 1916	Hackney South	George K Naylor (resigned 4 September 1916)	Charles Winkley	Municipal Reform
3 April 1917	Tower Hamlets, Bow and Bromley	George Malcolm Hilbery (resigned 9 March 1917)	Walter Charles Bersey	Municipal Reform
1 May 1917	Tower Hamlets, Mile End	George A Dutfield (resigned 18 July 1916)	George Bettesworth Piggott	Municipal Reform
16 October 1917	City of London	Gilbert Johnstone (resigned 31 July 1917)	John Robarts	Municipal Reform
18 December 1917	Islington East	Edward Smallwood (resigned 10 December 1917)	A C Denham	Progressive
8 March 1918	Strand	Clifford Probyn (died 10 February 1918)	John Maria Gatti	Municipal Reform
23 April 1918	City of London	James William Domoney (died 23 March 1918)	George Rowland Blades	Municipal Reform
15 October 1918	Camberwell, Dulwich	Cuthbert Wilkinson (died 20 June 1918)	Henry Newton Knights	Municipal Reform
15 October 1918	Lewisham	Frederick Houston Carter (died 11 March 1918)	Richard Owen Roberts	Municipal Reform
15 October 1918	Southwark West	Albert Wilson (died 16 July 1918)	Duchess of Marlborough	Progressive

== Aldermanic vacancies filled 1913–1919 ==
There were four casual vacancies among the aldermen in the term of the eleventh London County Council, which were filled as follows:

- 27 January 1914: Henry Cubitt Gooch (Municipal Reform) to serve until 1916 (extended to 1919) in place of Maurice C Carr Glyn, resigned 20 January 1914. Gooch had previously sat as a councillor from 1907 to 1910.
- 9 November 1915: Howard Willmott Liversidge (Municipal Reform) to serve until 1916 (extended to 1919) in place of Lord Monk Bretton, resigned 26 October 1915.
- 7 March 1916: Sir Harry Lushington Stephen (Municipal Reform) to serve until 1919 (extended to 1922) in place of Lord Chelmsford, resigned 22 February 1916.
- 4 April 1916: Francis Capel Harrison (Municipal Reform) to serve until 1919 (extended to 1922) in place of Cyril Jackson, resigned 21 March 1916.
