= Marylebone West (London County Council constituency) =

London County Council constituency

- Former constituency for the London County Council

Former constituency
- Created: 1889
- Abolished: 1919
- Member(s): 2
- Replaced by: St Marylebone

Marylebone West was a constituency used for elections to the London County Council between 1889 and 1919. The seat shared boundaries with the UK Parliament constituency of the same name.

== Councillors ==
Year	Name	Party	Name	Party
1889	Edmund Boulnois	Moderate	Reginald Hanson	Moderate
1892	Thomas Dewar	Moderate	Thomas Reed	Moderate
1895	Edward White	Moderate	Thomas Reed	Moderate
1897	Edward White	Moderate	Albert Yorke	Moderate
1901	Edward White	Moderate	Horace Farquhar	Moderate
1901	Edward White	Moderate	John Lewis	Progressive
1904	William Bailey	Conservative	John Lewis	Progressive
1907	Henry Cavendish-Bentinck	Municipal Reform	Henry Petty-Fitzmaurice	Municipal Reform
1910	Susan Lawrence	Municipal Reform	Edward White	Municipal Reform
1912	Charles Greville	Municipal Reform	Edward White	Municipal Reform
1914	Charles Greville	Municipal Reform	Eustace Widdrington Morrison-Bell	Municipal Reform
1916	Ernest Sanger	Municipal Reform	Eustace Widdrington Morrison-Bell	Municipal Reform

== Election results ==
1889 London County Council election: Marylebone West
Party	Candidate	Votes	%	±%
Moderate	Edmund Boulnois	2,278		
Moderate	Reginald Hanson	2,231		
Progressive	Frank Debenham	1,683		
Progressive	Richard Farrant	1,438		
Moderate win (new seat)				
Moderate win (new seat)				

1892 London County Council election: Marylebone West
Party	Candidate	Votes	%	±%
Moderate	Thomas Reed	1,973		
Moderate	Thomas Dewar	1,946		
Progressive	James Wentworth Leigh	1,888		
Progressive	Edward Markwick	1,815		
Moderate hold		Swing		
Moderate hold		Swing		

1895 London County Council election: Marylebone West
Party	Candidate	Votes	%	±%
Moderate	Thomas Reed	2,470		
Moderate	Edward White	2,438		
Progressive	Thomas Lister	2,392		
Progressive	Thomas Farrer	2,348		
Moderate hold		Swing		
Moderate hold		Swing		

1898 London County Council election: Marylebone West
Party	Candidate	Votes	%	±%
Moderate	Albert Yorke	3,035		
Moderate	Edward White	2,892		
Progressive	Algernon West	2,028		
Progressive	J. Wallop	2,015		
Moderate hold		Swing		
Moderate hold		Swing		

1901 London County Council election: Marylebone West
Party	Candidate	Votes	%	±%
Conservative	Horace Farquhar	2,290	26.9	−3.5
Conservative	Edward White	2,198	25.8	−3.2
Progressive	Warren Hastings Sands	2,054	24.2	+3.9
Progressive	Walter Gorst Clay	1,961	23.1	+2.9
Conservative hold		Swing		
Conservative hold		Swing	-3.3	

1904 London County Council election: Marylebone West
Party	Candidate	Votes	%	±%
Progressive	John Lewis	2,708		
Conservative	William Bailey	2,509		
Conservative	Edward White	2,450		
Progressive	Walter Leaf	1,747		
Majority				
Progressive gain from Municipal Reform		Swing		
Municipal Reform hold		Swing		

1907 London County Council election: Marylebone West
Party	Candidate	Votes	%	±%
Municipal Reform	Henry Bentinck	4,683		
Municipal Reform	Henry Petty-Fitzmaurice	4,625		
Progressive	John Lewis	2,434		
Progressive	J. Searson	2,320		
Majority				
Municipal Reform gain from Progressive		Swing		
Municipal Reform hold		Swing		

1910 London County Council election: Marylebone West
Party	Candidate	Votes	%	±%
Municipal Reform	Edward White	3,710		
Municipal Reform	Susan Lawrence	3,681		
Progressive	Connelly	1,378		
Progressive	Frederick Dolman	1,359		
Majority				
Municipal Reform hold		Swing		

1913 London County Council election: Marylebone West
Party	Candidate	Votes	%	±%
Municipal Reform	Charles Greville	4,010	33.1	−3.2
Municipal Reform	Edward White	3,942	32.5	−4.1
Progressive	Evelyn Fox	2,110	17.4	+3.8
Progressive	Charles James Vasey	2,066	17.0	+3.6
Majority		1,832	15.1	−7.6
Municipal Reform hold		Swing	-3.4	
Municipal Reform hold		Swing	-4.0	
