= Strand (London County Council constituency) =

London County Council constituency

- Former constituency for the London County Council

Former constituency
- Created: 1889
- Abolished: 1919
- Member: 2
- Replaced by: Westminster Abbey

Strand was a constituency used for elections to the London County Council between 1889 and 1919. The seat shared boundaries with the UK Parliament constituency of the same name.

== Councillors ==
Year	Name	Party	Name	Party
1889	Augustus Harris	Moderate	Clifford Probyn	Moderate
1892	Walter Emden	Moderate	Clifford Probyn	Moderate
1904	Hugo Francis Charteris	Conservative	Clifford Probyn	Moderate
1910	Philip Pilditch	Municipal Reform	Clifford Probyn	Moderate
1918	Philip Pilditch	Municipal Reform	John Maria Gatti	Municipal Reform

== Election results ==
1889 London County Council election: Strand
Party	Candidate	Votes	%	±%
Moderate	Augustus Harris	2,146		
Moderate	Clifford Probyn	1,407		
Progressive	Edward Colston Keevil	1,284		
Independent	John Bonthron	894		
Progressive	Edward Curtice	822		
Moderate	David Laing	597		
Moderate	Walter Emden	498		
Independent	J. R. Hale	55		
Moderate win (new seat)				
Moderate win (new seat)				

1892 London County Council election: Strand
Party	Candidate	Votes	%	±%
Moderate	Clifford Probyn	2,618		
Moderate	Walter Emden	2,225		
Progressive	F. C. Hunt	1,157		
Moderate hold		Swing		
Moderate hold		Swing		

1895 London County Council election: Strand
Party	Candidate	Votes	%	±%
Moderate	Clifford Probyn	2,723		
Moderate	Walter Emden	2,699		
Progressive	F. C. Hunt	1,217		
Progressive	W. Thrower	1,182		
Moderate hold		Swing		
Moderate hold		Swing		

1898 London County Council election: Strand
Party	Candidate	Votes	%	±%
Moderate	Clifford Probyn	2,697		
Moderate	Walter Emden	2,343		
Progressive	A. W. Oxford	1,664		
Progressive	Charles Charrington	1,356		
Moderate hold		Swing		

1901 London County Council election: Strand
Party	Candidate	Votes	%	±%
Conservative	Clifford Probyn	2,506	31.3	
Conservative	Walter Emden	2,452	30.6	
Social Reform	Arthur Kinnaird	1,571	19.6	n/a
Social Reform	William Grey	1,484	18.5	n/a
Conservative hold		Swing		
Conservative hold		Swing		

1904 London County Council election: Strand
Party	Candidate	Votes	%	±%
Conservative	Clifford Probyn	2,403		
Conservative	Hugo Francis Charteris	2,312		
Progressive	A. W. Oxford	1,220		
Progressive	J. S. Hyder	1,098		
Majority				
Conservative hold		Swing		

1907 London County Council election: Strand
Party	Candidate	Votes	%	±%
Municipal Reform	Clifford Probyn	3,580		
Municipal Reform	Hugo Francis Charteris	3,558		
Progressive	S. H. Lamb	903		
Progressive	W. H. Howell	895		
Majority				
Municipal Reform hold		Swing		

1910 London County Council election: Strand
Party	Candidate	Votes	%	±%
Municipal Reform	Clifford Probyn	3,004		
Municipal Reform	Philip Pilditch	2,974		
Progressive	J. M. Dent	758		
Progressive	Samuel Fenton	752		
Majority				
Municipal Reform hold		Swing		

1913 London County Council election: Strand
Party	Candidate	Votes	%	±%
Municipal Reform	Clifford Probyn	3,109		
Municipal Reform	Philip Pilditch	3,065		
Progressive	Ellen Pocock	793		
Majority		2,272		
Municipal Reform hold		Swing		
Municipal Reform hold		Swing		
