= Limehouse (London County Council constituency) =

London County Council constituency

- Former constituency for the London County Council

Former constituency
- Created: 1889
- Abolished: 1949
- Member(s): 2
- Replaced by: Stepney

Limehouse was a constituency used for elections to the London County Council between 1889 and 1949. The seat shared boundaries with the UK Parliament constituency of the same name.

== Councillors ==
| Year | Name | Party | Name | Party |
|---|---|---|---|---|
| 1889 | James Ambrose | Progressive | Arthur Lewis Leon | Progressive |
| 1892 | William Pearce | Progressive | Arthur Lewis Leon | Progressive |
| 1901 | William Byron Bawn | Progressive | Arthur Lewis Leon | Progressive |
| 1907 | Cyril Jackson | Municipal Reform | John Lort-Williams | Municipal Reform |
| 1910 | Cyril Jackson | Municipal Reform | Alfred Yeo | Progressive |
| 1913 | Benjamin Evans | Progressive | Alfred Yeo | Progressive |
| 1914 | Henry Bryant Marks | Progressive | Alfred Yeo | Progressive |
| 1919 | Henry Bryant Marks | Progressive | Robert Bryan | Labour |
| 1922 | Henry Bryant Marks | Progressive | Clarissa Bessie Lankester | Municipal Reform |
| 1925 | Isaac Lyons | Labour | Anna Mathew | Labour |
| 1928 | Malcolm MacDonald | Labour | Anna Mathew | Labour |
| 1931 | Henry James Lazarus | Labour | Anna Mathew | Labour |
| 1934 | Richard Coppock | Labour | Anna Mathew | Labour |
| 1937 | Richard Coppock | Labour | Monica Whately | Labour |
| 1946 | Richard Coppock | Labour | Louise Reeve | Labour |

== Election results ==
1889 London County Council election: Limehouse
| Party | Candidate | Votes | % | ±% |
|---|---|---|---|---|
| Progressive | James Ambrose | 1,817 | | |
| Progressive | Arthur Lewis Leon | 1,684 | | |
| Moderate | Robert Johnson | 1,243 | | |
| Independent | John Abbott | 1,067 | | |
| Moderate | Henry Cox | 204 | | |
| Progressive win (new seat) | | | | |
| Progressive win (new seat) | | | | |

1892 London County Council election: Limehouse
| Party | Candidate | Votes | % | ±% |
|---|---|---|---|---|
| Progressive | William Pearce | 2,415 | | |
| Progressive | Arthur Lewis Leon | 2,407 | | |
| Moderate | Adolphus Frederick Hirsch | 1,191 | | |
| Moderate | Henry Cox | 1,127 | | |
| Progressive hold | | Swing | | |
| Progressive hold | | Swing | | |

1895 London County Council election: Limehouse
| Party | Candidate | Votes | % | ±% |
|---|---|---|---|---|
| Progressive | William Pearce | 1,775 | | |
| Progressive | Arthur Lewis Leon | 1,718 | | |
| Moderate | J. R. Pascoe | 1,698 | | |
| Moderate | H. Byron Reed | 1,503 | | |
| Independent Liberal | J. W. Helps | 84 | | |
| Progressive hold | | Swing | | |
| Progressive hold | | Swing | | |

1898 London County Council election: Limehouse
| Party | Candidate | Votes | % | ±% |
|---|---|---|---|---|
| Progressive | William Pearce | 2,336 | | |
| Progressive | Arthur Lewis Leon | 2,142 | | |
| Moderate | J. R. Pascoe | 1,726 | | |
| Moderate | W. H. Porter | 1,553 | | |
| Progressive hold | | Swing | | |
| Progressive hold | | Swing | | |

1901 London County Council election: Limehouse
| Party | Candidate | Votes | % | ±% |
|---|---|---|---|---|
| Progressive | Arthur Lewis Leon | 1,751 | 29.1 | +1.5 |
| Progressive | William Byron Bawn | 1,637 | 27.2 | −2.9 |
| Conservative | Samuel Hugh Franklyn Hole | 1,326 | 22.1 | −0.1 |
| Conservative | Dalby Williams | 1,297 | 21.6 | +1.6 |
| Progressive hold | | Swing | | |
| Progressive hold | | Swing | -1.4 | |

1904 London County Council election: Limehouse
| Party | Candidate | Votes | % | ±% |
|---|---|---|---|---|
| Progressive | William Byron Bawn | 2,461 | | |
| Progressive | Arthur Lewis Leon | 2,381 | | |
| Conservative | H. C. Batchelor | 1,600 | | |
| Conservative | B. Levett | 1,590 | | |
| Majority | | | | |
| Progressive hold | | Swing | | |

1907 London County Council election: Limehouse
| Party | Candidate | Votes | % | ±% |
|---|---|---|---|---|
| Municipal Reform | Cyril Jackson | 2,141 | | |
| Municipal Reform | John Lort-Williams | 2,026 | | |
| Progressive | Arthur Lewis Leon | 1,957 | | |
| Progressive | T. L. Knight | 1,935 | | |
| Majority | | | | |
| Municipal Reform gain from Progressive | | Swing | | |
| Municipal Reform gain from Progressive | | Swing | | |

1910 London County Council election: Limehouse
| Party | Candidate | Votes | % | ±% |
|---|---|---|---|---|
| Progressive | Alfred Yeo | 1,963 | | |
| Municipal Reform | Cyril Jackson | 1,962 | | |
| Progressive | H. J. Ogden | 1,930 | | |
| Municipal Reform | George Lillie Craik | 1,825 | | |
| Majority | | | | |
| Progressive hold | | Swing | | |
| Progressive gain from Municipal Reform | | Swing | | |

1913 London County Council election: Limehouse
| Party | Candidate | Votes | % | ±% |
|---|---|---|---|---|
| Progressive | Benjamin Evans | 2,665 | | |
| Progressive | Alfred Yeo | 2,664 | | |
| Municipal Reform | Cyril Jackson | 2,024 | | |
| Municipal Reform | R. A. Reith | 1,916 | | |
| Majority | | 640 | | |
| Progressive hold | | Swing | | |
| Progressive gain from Municipal Reform | | Swing | | |

1919 London County Council election: Limehouse
| Party | Candidate | Votes | % | ±% |
|---|---|---|---|---|
| Progressive | Henry Bryant Marks | 1,269 | 23.1 | |
| Labour | Robert Bryan | 1,244 | 22.6 | |
| Labour | Clement Attlee | 1,147 | 20.8 | |
| Independent | R. Ridge | 1,110 | 20.2 | |
| Progressive | Ida Samuel | 732 | 13.3 | |
| Majority | | 97 | 0.2 | |
| Progressive hold | | Swing | | |
| Labour gain from Progressive | | Swing | | |

1922 London County Council election: Limehouse
| Party | Candidate | Votes | % | ±% |
|---|---|---|---|---|
| Progressive | Henry Bryant Marks | 5,746 | 28.8 | +5.7 |
| Municipal Reform | Clarissa Bessie Lankester | 5,454 | 27.4 | n/a |
| Labour | Julia Scurr | 4,385 | 22.0 | −0.6 |
| Labour | Skene Mackay | 4,350 | 21.8 | +1.0 |
| Majority | | 1,069 | 5.4 | +5.2 |
| Municipal Reform gain from Labour | | Swing | n/a | |
| Progressive hold | | Swing | | |

1925 London County Council election: Limehouse
| Party | Candidate | Votes | % | ±% |
|---|---|---|---|---|
| Labour | Isaac Lyons | 4,287 | | |
| Labour | Anna Mathew | 4,235 | | |
| Municipal Reform | Clarissa Bessie Lankester | 2,183 | | |
| Progressive | Henry Bryant Marks | 1,979 | | |
| Municipal Reform | P. W. Brown | 1,886 | | |
| Progressive | A. Hill | 1,415 | | |
| Majority | | | | |
| Labour gain from Progressive | | Swing | | |
| Labour gain from Municipal Reform | | Swing | | |

1928 London County Council election: Limehouse
| Party | Candidate | Votes | % | ±% |
|---|---|---|---|---|
| Labour | Malcolm MacDonald | 5,270 | | |
| Labour | Anna Mathew | 5,108 | | |
| Municipal Reform | K. Slattery | 2,648 | | |
| Municipal Reform | F. Simms | 2,565 | | |
| Liberal | A. Hill | 1,514 | | |
| Liberal | John Henry Maynard | 1,480 | | |
| Majority | | | | |
| Labour hold | | Swing | | |
| Labour hold | | Swing | | |

1931 London County Council election: Limehouse
| Party | Candidate | Votes | % | ±% |
|---|---|---|---|---|
| Labour | Anna Mathew | 3,375 | | |
| Labour | Henry Lazarus | 3,353 | | |
| Municipal Reform | Clarissa Bessie Lankester | 2,344 | | |
| Municipal Reform | T. A. N. Way | 2,050 | | |
| Independent | John Henry Maynard | 528 | | |
| Democratic | J. Cahill | 517 | | |
| Democratic | G. J. Warren | 477 | | |
| Majority | | | | |
| Labour hold | | Swing | | |
| Labour hold | | Swing | | |

1934 London County Council election: Limehouse
| Party | Candidate | Votes | % | ±% |
|---|---|---|---|---|
| Labour | Anna Mathew | 5,565 | | |
| Labour | Richard Coppock | 5,356 | | |
| Municipal Reform | Clarissa Bessie Lankester | 2,344 | | |
| Municipal Reform | John Boyd-Carpenter | 1,935 | | |
| Liberal | John Henry Maynard | 622 | | |
| Liberal | J. Johnson | 479 | | |
| Majority | | | | |
| Labour hold | | Swing | | |
| Labour hold | | Swing | | |

1937 London County Council election: Limehouse
| Party | Candidate | Votes | % | ±% |
|---|---|---|---|---|
| Labour | Richard Coppock | 8,272 | | |
| Labour | Monica Whately | 8,042 | | |
| Municipal Reform | V. G. Weeple | 2,542 | | |
| Municipal Reform | G. E. Abrahams | 2,431 | | |
| British Union of Fascists | A. Brook-Griggs | 2,086 | | |
| British Union of Fascists | Charles Wegg-Prosser | 2,086 | | |
| Majority | | | | |
| Labour hold | | Swing | | |
| Labour hold | | Swing | | |

1946 London County Council election: Limehouse
| Party | Candidate | Votes | % | ±% |
|---|---|---|---|---|
| Labour | Richard Coppock | 2,333 | | |
| Labour | Louise Reeve | 2,206 | | |
| Conservative | P. Woodard | 593 | | |
| Conservative | M. Barclay | 550 | | |
| Majority | | | | |
| Labour hold | | Swing | | |
| Labour hold | | Swing | | |
