= J. E. Woolacott =

British journalist and activist

John Evans Woolacott (1861 – 31 January 1936) was a British journalist, newspaper editor, and political activist.

Born in Milford Haven, Woolacott was educated at the Menai Bridge School. He became a journalist, and from 1887 was a lobby correspondent for the Central News Agency, later working for the agency in Ireland, Morocco and Egypt.

Woolacott became interested in social matters by reading Henry George's Progress and Poverty. He joined the English Land Reformation League, and later also the Fabian Society and the Independent Labour Party (ILP). At the 1895 UK general election, Woolacott stood unsuccessfully for the ILP in Glasgow St Rollox, and he was also unsuccessful in Finsbury Central in the 1898 London County Council election.

During the 1890s, Woolacott was editor of the Democrat, which had been founded by William Saunders, and assistant editor of the Weekly Dispatch. In 1903 he became assistant editor of The Economist. He was elected as president of the Institute of Journalists in 1908, but left the post to become assistant editor of The Statesman, in Kolkata, then in 1913 became editor of the Bombay Gazette. This soon closed, and Woolacott returned to England. By this time, he had switched to support the Liberal Party. In 1914, he was adopted as its Prospective Parliamentary Candidate for Coventry, but due to the outbreak of World War I, no election was held until 1918, and Woolacott did not stand.

Woolacott returned to India in 1916, working for The Pioneer and The Times. He became editor of The Pioneer in 1921, but left in 1925 to return to London. His politics were now conservative, and he wrote India on Trial, in which he argued against political reform in the country.
