= Elizabeth Jacobs (politician) =

English medical doctor and politician

Elizabeth Jacobs (born 1900) was an English medical doctor and politician.

Jacobs was educated at Highbury School, King's College London, and St Mary's Hospital in Paddington. She qualified as a doctor in 1925, and married fellow doctor Lawrence Jacobs soon after. She spent a period working as a clinical assistant at the Elizabeth Garrett Anderson Hospital, then set up a general practice on Church Street in Marylebone.

Jacobs joined the Labour Party, and won a seat on St Marylebone Metropolitan Borough Council. She stood in the 1935 and 1945 UK general elections in St Marylebone, but was not elected. She also stood in the 1931 and 1955, 1958 and 1961 London County Council elections in the equivalent seat, again without success.

In 1952, Jacobs' son, Leonard, joined her at the practice, and in 1964 her daughter, Anne, also joined. She stood down as a local councillor in 1962, becoming an alderman, and in 1964/65 she served as the last Deputy Mayor of St Marylebone. She retired in 1973, spending her time campaigning for improvements to local housing.

In 1992, Illtyd Harrington described Jacobs as "one of three outstanding women in the St Marylebone Labour Party...[she] probably wrote the rules for NHS group practice".
