= Finsbury Central (London County Council constituency) =

London County Council constituency

- Former constituency for the London County Council

Former constituency
- Created: 1889
- Abolished: 1919
- Member(s): 2
- Replaced by: Finsbury

Finsbury Central was a constituency used for elections to the London County Council between 1889 and 1919. The seat shared boundaries with the UK Parliament constituency of the same name.

== Councillors ==
Year	Name	Party	Name	Party
1889	William Compton	Progressive	Frederick Alfred Ford	Progressive
1892	Ashley Ponsonby	Progressive	Ernest Bowen Rowlands	Progressive
1892	Ashley Ponsonby	Progressive	William Farewell Blake	Progressive
1898	Phillip John Rutland	Moderate	Melvill Beachcroft	Moderate
1901	Fitzroy Hemphill	Progressive	Frank Smith	Labour Progressive
1901	Fitzroy Hemphill	Progressive	Ramsay MacDonald	Labour Progressive
1904	Fitzroy Hemphill	Progressive	Arthur Barnett Russell	Progressive
1910	Lawrence Rostron	Municipal Reform	Arthur Barnett Russell	Progressive
1913	Lawrence Rostron	Municipal Reform	Samuel Joyce Thomas	Municipal Reform
1916	James Little	Municipal Reform	Samuel Joyce Thomas	Municipal Reform

== Election results ==
1889 London County Council election: Finsbury Central
Party	Candidate	Votes	%	±%
Progressive	William Compton	2,323		
Progressive	Frederick Alfred Ford	1,461		
Ratepayers	Henry Edward Davis	1,074		
Independent	William Robson	841		
Independent	William Davies	561		
Independent	Joseph John Goode	374		
Independent	John Ross	74		
Progressive win (new seat)				
Progressive win (new seat)				

1892 London County Council election: Finsbury Central
Party	Candidate	Votes	%	±%
Progressive	Ashley Ponsonby	1,902		
Progressive	Ernest Bowen Rowlands	1,902		
Independent Moderate	Henry Edward Davis	1,265		
Moderate	John Bourne	1,139		
Progressive hold		Swing		
Progressive hold		Swing		

1892 Finsbury Central by-election
Party	Candidate	Votes	%	±%
Progressive	William Farewell Blake	1,674		
Moderate	Philip John Rutland	820		
Independent Moderate	Henry Edward Davis	477		
Progressive hold		Swing		

1895 London County Council election: Finsbury Central
Party	Candidate	Votes	%	±%
Progressive	William Farewell Blake	2,247		
Progressive	Ashley Ponsonby	2,241		
Moderate	A. Churchill	2,218		
Moderate	Phillip John Rutland	2,143		
Progressive hold		Swing		
Progressive hold		Swing		

1898 London County Council election: Finsbury Central
Party	Candidate	Votes	%	±%
Conservative	Phillip John Rutland	2,392		
Conservative	Melvill Beachcroft	2,286		
Progressive	William Farewell Blake	2,267		
Progressive	Arthur Hayter	1,987		
Ind. Labour Party	J. E. Woolacott	382		
Moderate gain from Progressive		Swing		
Moderate gain from Progressive		Swing		

1901 London County Council election: Finsbury Central
Party	Candidate	Votes	%	±%
Progressive	Fitzroy Hemphill	2,023	26.8	+1.4
Progressive	Frank Smith	2,021	26.7	+4.5
Conservative	Phillip John Rutland	1,796	23.8	−3.0
Conservative	Sidney Low	1,722	22.8	−2.8
Progressive gain from Conservative		Swing		
Progressive gain from Conservative		Swing	+5.8	

1904 London County Council election: Finsbury Central
Party	Candidate	Votes	%	±%
Progressive	Fitzroy Hemphill	2,361		
Progressive	Arthur Barnett Russell	2,338		
Conservative	R. F. Hosken	1,935		
Conservative	F. H. M. Wayne	1,914		
Majority				
Progressive hold		Swing		
Progressive hold		Swing		

1907 London County Council election: Finsbury Central
Party	Candidate	Votes	%	±%
Progressive	Fitzroy Hemphill	2,806		
Progressive	Arthur Barnett Russell	2,791		
Municipal Reform	George Swinton	2,508		
Municipal Reform	M. Chapman	2,507		
Majority				
Progressive hold		Swing		
Progressive hold		Swing		

1910 London County Council election: Finsbury Central
Party	Candidate	Votes	%	±%
Progressive	Arthur Barnett Russell	2,482	25.3	
Municipal Reform	Lawrence William Simpson Rostron	2,460	25.1	
Progressive	Fitzroy Hemphill	2,459	25.0	
Municipal Reform	Samuel Joyce Thomas	2,420	24.6	
Majority				
Progressive hold		Swing		
Municipal Reform gain from Progressive		Swing		

1913 London County Council election: Finsbury Central
Party	Candidate	Votes	%	±%
Municipal Reform	Lawrence William Simpson Rostron	3,006	25.6	+0.5
Municipal Reform	Samuel Joyce Thomas	2,947	25.1	+0.5
Progressive	Arthur Barnett Russell	2,929	25.0	−0.3
Progressive	Herbert Sutton Syrett	2,853	24.3	−0.7
Majority		18	0.1	
Municipal Reform hold		Swing	+0.6	
Municipal Reform gain from Progressive		Swing	+0.4	
