= Ernest Sanger =

British Conservative politician (1875–1939

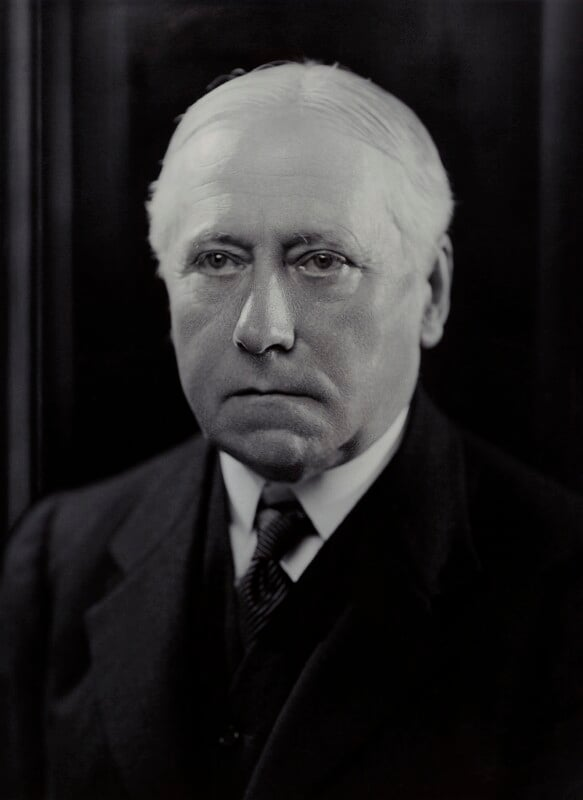
Sanger in 1936

Sir Ernest Sanger (17 July 1875 – 26 December 1939) was a British politician who served on London County Council.

Sanger was educated at New College in Eastbourne. Sanger was appointed as a Conservative Party alderman on the Metropolitan Borough of St Marylebone council, and served as Mayor of Marylebone in 1920/1921. He was elected to the London County Council in 1916, to represent the Municipal Reform Party in Marylebone West. At the 1919 London County Council election, this seat was merged into the new St Marylebone constituency, with Sanger continuing to hold a seat.

Sanger was immediately chosen to represent the council on the London Old Age Pensions Committee, serving until 1920, after which he switched to the Central Association for Mental Welfare. During the 1920s, he also chaired a succession of council committees. In 1929/1930, he was vice chairman of the council, then chair in 1931/1932. He was made a knight bachelor in 1936. He died, still in office, at the end of 1939.

Political offices
Preceded by Robert Tasker	Chairman of London County Council; 1931–1932	Succeeded by Angus Scott
