= Anna Mathew =

Irish politician

Anna Maria Mathew (1874 – 5 April 1948) was an Irish politician, who served on London County Council.

Born in Monasterevin, in Ireland as Anna Cassidy, she received a private education. In 1896, she married Charles James Mathew, who became a barrister and a Labour Party politician. Anna also joined the party, and became active in the National Union of Women Workers.

Charles died in 1923, and Anna was elected to replace him as an alderman on London County Council. At the 1925 London County Council election, she won a seat in Limehouse, and in 1933/34 she was deputy chair of the council. In 1924, she served on the Royal Commission on Lunacy Law.

Mathew stood down from the council in 1937, and her health declined. She died in 1948, following a long illness.
