= List of mayors of Bassendean =

The Town of Bassendean in Perth, Western Australia was established as the West Guildford Road District, with a chairman and councillors, on 10 May 1901 under the District Roads Act 1871. It was renamed Bassendean on 7 July 1922. With the passage of the Local Government Act 1960, all road districts became Shires, with a president and councillors, effective 1 July 1961. On 1 July 1975, the Shire of Bassendean became the Town of Bassendean, with a mayor and councillors.

The female mayor was Vicki Philipoff, who was elected in 1995, and served two years.

== West Guildford Road District ==
Chairman	Term
Cyril Jackson	1901–1903
J. T. Short	1903–1905
Charles Rickwood Wicks	1907–1908
Percy J. Atkins	1908–1909
P. J. Huelin	1909–1910
Charles Rickwood Wicks	1910–1913
J. Pickering	1913–1914
A. Y. Garnsworthy	1914–1915
H. C. Barnard	1915–1917
Charles Rickwood Wicks	1917–1920
Edward James Clay	1920–1921
Commissioner (9 February–9 April 1921)	1921
John Pickering	1921–1922

== Bassendean Road District ==
Chairman	Term
John Pickering	1922–1923
John Milne Steele	1923–1928
Joseph Gallagher	1928–1929
Richard Alexander McDonald	1929–1938
Edward Ernest Ireland	1938–1939
Richard Alexander McDonald	1939–1947
John Henry Smallman	1947–1952
Charles Otto Freiberg	1952–1955
Samuel James Faithful	1955–1957
Charles Otto Freiberg	1957–1958
Alfred Charles Faulkner	1958–1960
Richard Alexander McDonald	1960–1961

== Shire of Bassendean ==
President	Term
Richard Alexander McDonald	1961–1962
Alfred Charles Faulkner	1962–1970
Dr John George Paterson	1970–1975

== Town of Bassendean ==
Mayor	Term
Dr John Paterson	1975–1984
John Bernard Cox	1984–1988
Paul Bridges	1988–1990
John Bernard Cox	1990–1995
Vicki Philipoff	1995–1997
Lindsay Fisher	1997–1997
Bevan Carter	1997–2001
Greg Peterson	2001–2003
Tina Klein	2003–2009
John Gangell	2009–2017
Renee McLennan	2017–2021
Kath Hamilton	2021–present
