= St Marylebone (London County Council constituency) =

London County Council constituency

- Former constituency for the London County Council

Former constituency
- Created: 1919
- Abolished: 1965
- Member(s): 2 (to 1949); 3 (from 1949)
- Created from: Marylebone East and Marylebone West

St Marylebone was a constituency used for elections to the London County Council between 1919 and the council's abolition, in 1965. The seat shared boundaries with the UK Parliament constituency of the same name.

== Councillors ==
Year	Name	Party	Name	Party	Name	Party
1919	Eustace Widdrington Morrison-Bell	Municipal Reform	Ernest Sanger	Municipal Reform	Two seats until 1949	
1922	Adeline Roberts	Municipal Reform	Ernest Sanger	Municipal Reform	Two seats until 1949	
1934	Frederick William Dean	Municipal Reform	Ernest Sanger	Municipal Reform	Two seats until 1949	
1940	Frederick William Dean	Municipal Reform	Richard Stiles Allen	Municipal Reform	Two seats until 1949	
1946	Alfred Coucher	Conservative	Eric Hall	Municipal Reform	Two seats until 1949	
1949	Alfred Coucher	Conservative	Lucy Nettlefold	Conservative	Derek Webster	Conservative
1952	Alfred Coucher	Conservative	Lucy Nettlefold	Conservative	Ronald Orpen	Conservative
1955	Alfred Coucher	Conservative	Lucy Nettlefold	Conservative	Miles Clifford	Conservative
1955	Louis Gluckstein	Conservative	Lucy Nettlefold	Conservative	Miles Clifford	Conservative
1958	Louis Gluckstein	Conservative	Lucy Nettlefold	Conservative	Winston Drapkin	Conservative
1960	Louis Gluckstein	Conservative	Desmond Plummer	Conservative	Winston Drapkin	Conservative

== Election results ==
1919 London County Council election: St Marylebone
Party	Candidate	Votes	%	±%
Municipal Reform	Eustace Widdrington Morrison-Bell	Unopposed		
Municipal Reform	Ernest Sanger	Unopposed		
Municipal Reform hold		Swing		
Municipal Reform hold		Swing		

1922 London County Council election: St Marylebone
Party	Candidate	Votes	%	±%
Municipal Reform	Adeline Roberts	Unopposed	n/a	n/a
Municipal Reform	Ernest Sanger	Unopposed	n/a	n/a
Municipal Reform hold		Swing		
Municipal Reform hold		Swing		

1925 London County Council election: St Marylebone
Party	Candidate	Votes	%	±%
Municipal Reform	Adeline Roberts	7,561		n/a
Municipal Reform	Ernest Sanger	7,541		n/a
Labour	N. E. C. Jacob	3,688		n/a
Labour	A. E. Kennard	3,651		n/a
Municipal Reform hold		Swing		
Municipal Reform hold		Swing		

1928 London County Council election: St Marylebone
Party	Candidate	Votes	%	±%
Municipal Reform	Ernest Sanger	9,029		
Municipal Reform	Adeline Mary Roberts	8,988		
Labour	Nils Henry Moller	2,319		
Labour	Lillian Augusta Dawson	2,310		
Liberal	Harcourt Johnstone	1,514		n/a
Liberal	Frances Josephy	1,431		n/a
Independent	John Struthers	88		n/a
Municipal Reform hold		Swing		
Municipal Reform hold		Swing		

1931 London County Council election: St Marylebone
Party	Candidate	Votes	%	±%
Municipal Reform	Ernest Sanger	8,733		
Municipal Reform	Adeline Roberts	8,718		
Labour	Elizabeth Jacobs	1,732		
Labour	Jack Gaster	1,631		
Municipal Reform hold		Swing		
Municipal Reform hold		Swing		

1934 London County Council election: St Marylebone
Party	Candidate	Votes	%	±%
Municipal Reform	Ernest Sanger	8,574		
Municipal Reform	Frederick William Dean	8,547		
Ind. Labour Party	Jack Gaster	1,622		
Ind. Labour Party	E. Mahony	1,556		
Municipal Reform hold		Swing		
Municipal Reform hold		Swing		

1937 London County Council election: St Marylebone
Party	Candidate	Votes	%	±%
Municipal Reform	Ernest Sanger	11,971		
Municipal Reform	Frederick William Dean	11,652		
Labour	E. P. Young	3,690		
Labour	C. R. Ruddock	3,526		
Municipal Reform hold		Swing		
Municipal Reform hold		Swing		

1946 London County Council election: St Marylebone
Party	Candidate	Votes	%	±%
Conservative	Alfred Coucher	9,345		
Conservative	Eric Hall	9,242		
Labour	D. A. Sharpe	5,149		
Labour	T. W. Vernon	5,037		
Conservative hold		Swing		
Conservative hold		Swing		

1949 London County Council election: St Marylebone
Party	Candidate	Votes	%	±%
Conservative	Lucy Nettlefold	17,779		
Conservative	Alfred Coucher	17,733		
Conservative	Derek Webster	17,562		
Labour	T. W. Vernon	6,114		
Labour	L. Lyons	6,073		
Labour	N. Whine	5,743		
Conservative win (new seat)				
Conservative hold		Swing		
Conservative hold		Swing		

1952 London County Council election: St Marylebone
Party	Candidate	Votes	%	±%
Conservative	Lucy Nettlefold	15,501		
Conservative	Alfred Coucher	15,240		
Conservative	Ronald Orpen	15,202		
Labour	Kaitlin Bingham	6,818		
Labour	R. Grange	6,776		
Labour	T. W. Vernon	6,738		
Conservative hold		Swing		
Conservative hold		Swing		
Conservative hold		Swing		

1955 London County Council election: St Marylebone
Party	Candidate	Votes	%	±%
Conservative	Alfred Coucher	13,007		
Conservative	Lucy Nettlefold	12,933		
Conservative	Miles Clifford	12,836		
Labour	Elizabeth Jacobs	4,431		
Labour	S. V. Clements	3,956		
Labour	T. W. Vernon	3,953		
Liberal	I. Shawyer	909		
Liberal	C. Bleach	788		
Liberal	D. E. Blackburn	767		
Conservative hold		Swing		
Conservative hold		Swing		
Conservative hold		Swing		

Louis Gluckstein elected unopposed 1955

1958 London County Council election: St Marylebone
Party	Candidate	Votes	%	±%
Conservative	Lucy Nettlefold	10,586		
Conservative	Louis Gluckstein	10,585		
Conservative	Winston Drapkin	10,006		
Labour	Elizabeth Jacobs	4,721		
Labour	George Bingham	4,342		
Labour	R. P. Gould	4,277		
Liberal	Edwin Michael Wheeler	1,757		
Liberal	S. D. Gee	1,754		
Liberal	M. H. Webber	1,738		
Conservative hold		Swing		
Conservative hold		Swing		
Conservative hold		Swing		

Desmond Plummer elected unopposed 1960

1961 London County Council election: St Marylebone
Party	Candidate	Votes	%	±%
Conservative	Louis Gluckstein	10,293		
Conservative	Winston Drapkin	10,234		
Conservative	Desmond Plummer	10,029		
Labour	Elizabeth Jacobs	4,131		
Labour	Kaitlin Bingham	3,825		
Labour	T. W. Vernon	3,693		
Liberal	M. Cummins	1,585		
Liberal	Anna Harman	1,493		
Liberal	H. Bab	1,296		
Conservative hold		Swing		
Conservative hold		Swing		
Conservative hold		Swing		
