= Marylebone East =

Parliamentary constituency in the United Kingdom, 1885–1918

- Former borough constituency for the House of Commons
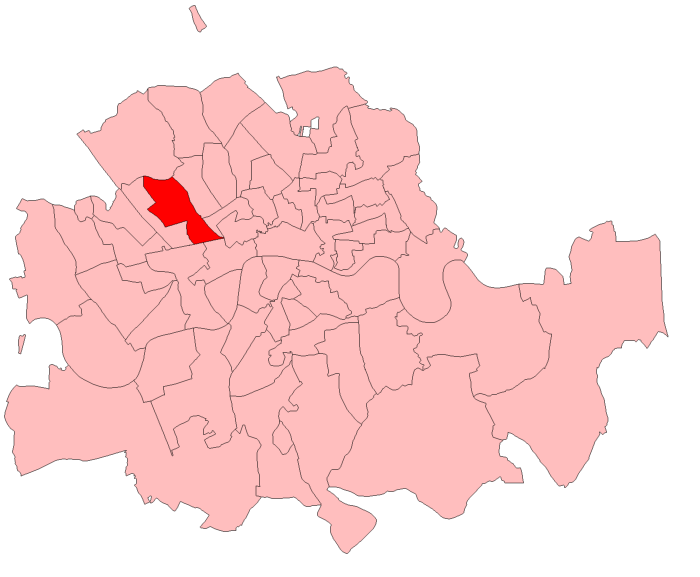
- Marylebone East in London

1885–1918
- Seats: one
- Created from: Marylebone
- Replaced by: St Marylebone

Marylebone East was a borough constituency located in the Metropolitan Borough of St Marylebone, in London. It returned one Member of Parliament (MP) to the House of Commons of the Parliament of the United Kingdom, elected by the first past the post voting system.

The constituency was created under the Redistribution of Seats Act 1885, and was formerly part of the two-seat Marylebone constituency. It was abolished for the 1918 general election.

== Boundaries ==
The wards of Cavendish Square, Dorset Square and Regent's Park, Portland Place, and St John's Wood Terrace.

== Members of Parliament ==
Year	Member	Party
1885	Lord Charles Beresford	Conservative
1889	Edmund Boulnois	Conservative
1906	Lord Robert Cecil	Conservative
1910	James Boyton	Conservative
1918	constituency abolished	

== Elections ==
=== Elections in the 1880s ===
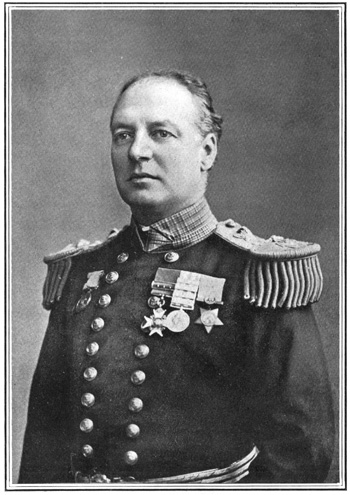
Beresford

General election 1885: Marylebone East
Party	Candidate	Votes	%	±%
Conservative	Lord Charles Beresford	3,130	58.9	
Liberal	Daniel Grant	2,186	41.1	
Majority		944	17.8	
Turnout		5,316	77.2	
Registered electors		6,884		
Conservative win (new seat)				

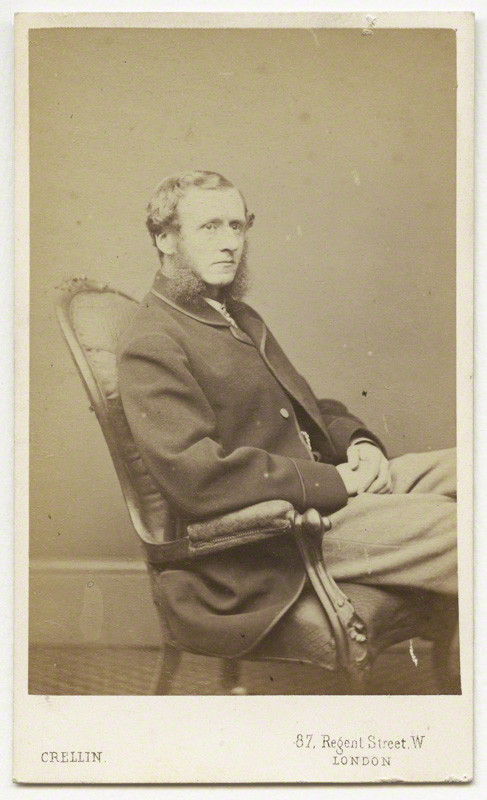
Beesly

General election 1886: Marylebone East
Party	Candidate	Votes	%	±%
Conservative	Lord Charles Beresford	3,101	65.7	+6.8
Liberal	Edward Spencer Beesly	1,616	34.3	−6.8
Majority		1,485	31.4	+13.6
Turnout		4,717	68.5	−8.7
Registered electors		6,884		
Conservative hold		Swing	+6.8	

Beresford was appointed Lord Commissioner of the Admiralty, requiring a by-election.

By-election, 11 Aug 1886: Marylebone East
Party	Candidate	Votes	%	±%
Conservative	Lord Charles Beresford	Unopposed		
Conservative hold				

Beresford resigned, causing a by-election.

By-election, 19 Jul 1889: Marylebone East
Party	Candidate	Votes	%	±%
Conservative	Edmund Boulnois	2,579	55.3	−10.4
Liberal	Lord Leveson	2,086	44.7	+10.4
Majority		493	10.6	−20.8
Turnout		4,665	67.3	−1.2
Registered electors		6,930		
Conservative hold		Swing	−10.4	

=== Elections in the 1890s ===
General election 1892: Marylebone East
Party	Candidate	Votes	%	±%
Conservative	Edmund Boulnois	3,122	57.6	−8.1
Liberal	George Whale	2,300	42.4	+8.1
Majority		822	15.2	−16.2
Turnout		5,422	71.7	+3.2
Registered electors		7,564		
Conservative hold		Swing	−8.1	

General election 1895: Marylebone East
Party	Candidate	Votes	%	±%
Conservative	Edmund Boulnois	3,379	64.7	+7.1
Liberal	Alan Gardner	1,845	35.3	−7.1
Majority		1,534	29.4	+14.2
Turnout		5,224	68.1	−3.6
Registered electors		7,670		
Conservative hold		Swing	+7.1	

=== Elections in the 1900s ===
General election 1900: Marylebone East
Party	Candidate	Votes	%	±%
Conservative	Edmund Boulnois	3,106	73.4	+8.7
Liberal	James Patrick Ronaldson Lyell	1,126	26.6	−8.7
Majority		1,980	46.8	+17.4
Turnout		4,232	60.7	−7.4
Registered electors		6,972		
Conservative hold		Swing	+8.7	

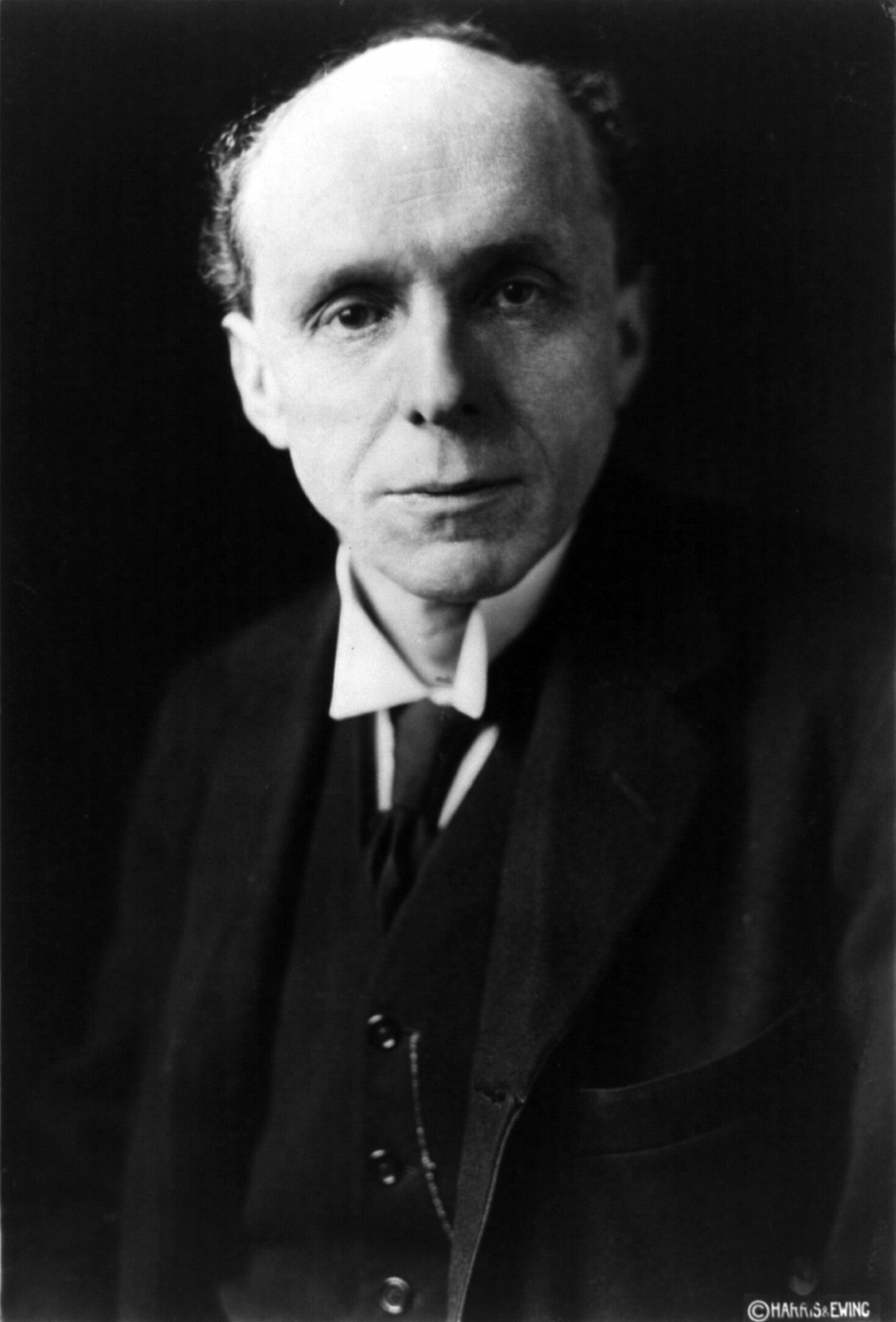
Cecil

General election 1906: Marylebone East
Party	Candidate	Votes	%	±%
Conservative	Lord Robert Cecil	2,827	56.6	−16.8
Liberal	Adolph Max Langdon	2,167	43.4	+16.8
Majority		660	13.2	−33.6
Turnout		4,994	75.8	+15.1
Registered electors		6,588		
Conservative hold		Swing	-16.8	

=== Elections in the 1910s ===
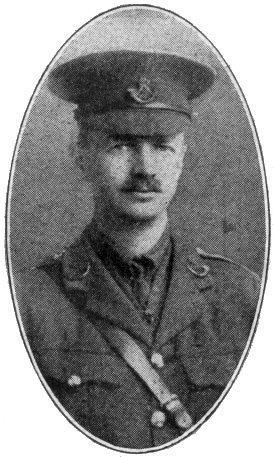
Jebb

General election January 1910: Marylebone East
Party	Candidate	Votes	%	±%
Conservative	James Boyton	3,134	54.6	−2.0
Liberal	Robert Moon	1,905	33.2	−10.2
Ind. Conservative	Richard Jebb	702	12.2	New
Majority		1,229	21.4	+8.2
Turnout		5,741	84.9	+9.1
Registered electors		6,759		
Conservative hold		Swing	+4.1	

General election December 1910: Marylebone East
Party	Candidate	Votes	%	±%
Conservative	James Boyton	3,376	67.8	+13.2
Liberal	Robert Moon	1,605	32.2	−1.0
Majority		1,771	35.6	+14.2
Turnout		4,981	73.7	−11.2
Registered electors		6,759		
Conservative hold		Swing	+7.1	
