= James Boyton =

British politician

Boyton in 1917.

Sir James Boyton JP (1855 – 16 May 1926) was a British estate agent and a Conservative politician.

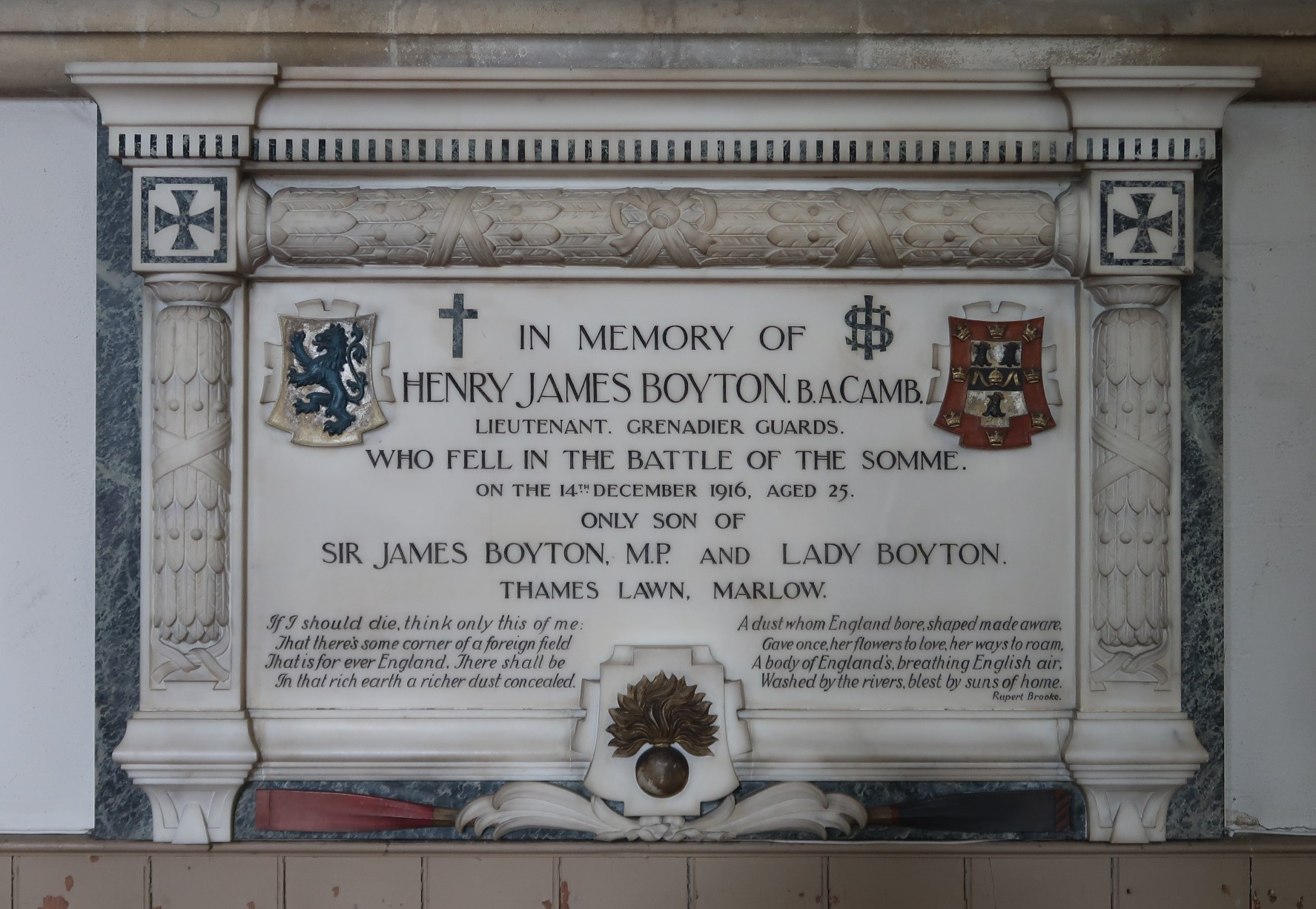
Memorial to Henry James Boyton (died 1916), the only son of Sir James Boyton, showing his family arms (top left)

Boyton was born in Shoreditch, London, to Henry and Sarah Boyton. He joined his family firm of Elliott, Son and Boyton in 1878. He was president of the Auctioneers' and Estate Agents' Institute for 1905–6. He also served as a Justice of the peace (JP) for the County of London.

Boyton was a member of the London County Council from 1907 to 1910, representing the Municipal Reform Party. Successfully contesting both the January 1910 parliamentary election and the December 1910 election, he was Unionist Member of Parliament (MP) for Marylebone East from 1910 to 1918. Boyton was knighted in the 1918 New Year Honours.

His only son, Henry James Boyton, was killed on 14 December 1916 during the Battle of the Somme.

Parliament of the United Kingdom
Preceded by Lord Robert Cecil	Member of Parliament for Marylebone East; 1910–1918	Constituency abolished
