= Clifford Probyn =

British politician (1842–1918)

2nd Mayor of Westminster
- In office 1901–1902
- Preceded by: Henry Fitzalan-Howard, 15th Duke of Norfolk
- Succeeded by: Herbert Jessel, 1st Baron Jessel

Sheriff of the City of London
- In office 1898–1899 Serving with Sir Frederick Alliston
- Preceded by: Sir Frank Green, 1st Baronet & Thomas Dewar, 1st Baron Dewar
- Succeeded by: Sir William Treloar, 1st Baronet & Sir Alfred Henry Bevan

Deputy Chairman of the London County Council
- In office 1905–1906
- Preceded by: Frederick Prat Alliston
- Succeeded by: Elijah Baxter Forman

London County Councillor for Strand
- In office 17 January 1889 – 10 February 1918
- Preceded by: Office established
- Succeeded by: John Maria Gatti

London School Board Member for Westminster
- In office 1885–1888
- Preceded by: James Ross
- Succeeded by: Rev. Arthur Gerald Bowman

Personal details
- Born: 21 June 1842 Monmouthshire, Wales
- Died: 10 February 1918 (aged 75)
- Party: Municipal Reform Party
- Spouse: Hannah Morrison (m. 1865)
- Children: 3

Clifford Probyn, VD (21 June 1842 – 10 February 1918) was a British Municipal Reform Party politician.

Born to parents Thomas Probyn and Mary Morgan, Probyn married Hannah Morrison in 1865 and had 3 sons. Probyn was a member of the 22nd Middlesex Volunteer Rifle Corps, a part-time civilian military unit raised in 1860, becoming the unit commander and later joining the Queen's Westminsters reaching the rank of Lieutenant Colonel.
