= Walter Emden =

British architect (1847–1913)

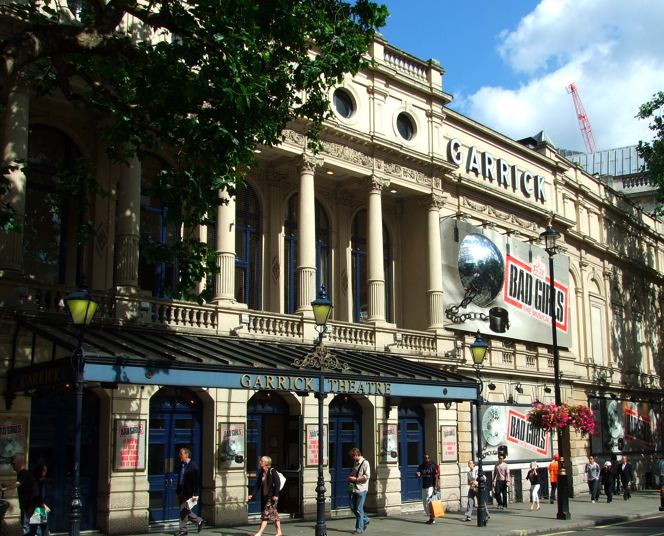
The Garrick, shown in 2007, was built by Emden with C. J. Phipps in 1888.

Walter Lawrence Emden (1847 – 1913) was one of the leading English theatre and music hall architects in the building boom of 1885 to 1915.

== Biography ==
Emden was the second son of William S. Emden, lessee of London's Olympic Theatre, and was born in the vicinity of the theatre in The Strand. Originally studying as a civil engineer, he joined architects Kelly and Lawes in 1870 in the burgeoning construction of theatres. He was immediately given the commission of designing the Globe Theatre. Emden also became a member of the Strand District Board of Works, a forerunner of local councils, and for seven years acted as chair. In 1890, he was elected to the London County Council.

In 1880, W. G. R. Sprague, a former pupil of Frank Matcham, joined Emden's practice as an apprentice for three years. From 1889, Emden entered a partnership with Charles J. Phipps building the Tivoli, Garrick Theatre and Duke of York's. His most important work, The Tivoli, in the Strand, became the archetype for music hall and variety theatre architecture.

His work extended to hotels, restaurants and, as it became popular, cinemas. He also had a younger half-brother, Henry (1852–1930), who was a leading scenic artist, painting the stage curtain for Walter's Trafalgar Theatre in 1892.

In 1903 Walter Emden became the 4th Mayor of Westminster, before becoming the Mayor of Dover in November 1907 under somewhat unusual circumstances. He was the first mayor not to be a member of the Town Council, and was elected under a special provision of the Municipal Corporations Act enabling a duly qualified burgess to take the position.

An energetic mayor, he was a driving force in promoting the Dover Pageant of 1908, and it was around this time that he bought a controlling interest in A.L Thomas & Sons Ltd, an iron foundry based in Dover that specialised in the manufacture and supply of fencing, pipes and manhole covers. Emden put his nephew, Vivian Elkington, in charge of the firm, which was renamed The Dover Engineering Works Ltd on September 3, 1909, and eventually became famous for the manufacture of iron gas and airtight inspection covers, still manufactured and supplied across the globe by the same company today, although under a different name (Gatic).

== Legacy ==
The Guide to British Theatres describes Emden's early work as "the epitome of architectural illiteracy" betraying his lack of formal training in architecture. He benefited from his collaborations and the Guide describes a "well behaved, precise quality to Emden's later work which properly reflects his social achievements in the world of affairs" Sadly, theatre and music-hall design was not accorded the same accolades accorded to civic and church architecture when they were built, it was not until the late 20th century that they were accorded any importance and many of Emden's surviving buildings have now been listed as being of architectural significance.

He formally retired in 1906, passing the practice to Emden, Egan and Co., a partnership formed from his four principal assistants; Stephen H. Egan, William S. Emden, A. J. Croughton and T. C. Overtone. They remained in offices in Lancaster Place, off the Strand and designed many suburban London cinemas and hotels, including the iconic "State Cinema" (1910) in Leytonstone. Most of these large cinemas have now succumbed, as music-hall did to them, to television and been modified to other uses, or demolished. Emden died in London in 1913.

== Theatres ==
His list of theatre designs include:

Theatre	Location	Build Date	Original Seating Capacity	Status	Notes
Globe Theatre	Newcastle Street	1870	1,800	Demolished 1902	
Theatre Royal	Barnsley	1877	800		
Terry's Theatre	Strand	1887	800	Demolished 1923	
Royal Court Theatre	Sloane Square	1888	642	Grade II	with assistant Bertie Crewe
Garrick Theatre	Charing Cross Road	1889	800	Grade II*	with Charles J. Phipps
City Theatre; Leno's Varieties	Sheffield	c1890		Burnt down 1893	
Tivoli Theatre of Varieties	The Strand	1890	1,500	Demolished 1916	Further alterations 1910
Trafalgar Theatre later, the Duke of York's	St Martin's Lane	1890	900	Grade II	
Palace Theatre	Cambridge Circus	1892	1,400	Grade II*	Conversion to variety theatre
Royalty Theatre	Soho	1895	657	Demolished 1953 war damaged	Alterations
Imperial Theatre	Tothill Street, Westminster	1898		Rebuilt 1901	Alterations
Lyceum Theatre	Ipswich	1891	1200	Closed and Demolished	
Empire Theatre	Swansea Oxford st	1900		Demolished 1960	For Oswald Stoll & Moss
