= John Fletcher Little =

Irish physician and Liberal Party politician

- Born: 1843; County Tipperary
- Died: 9 August 1914 (aged 70–71)
- Occupation: Physician

John Fletcher Little (1843 – 9 August 1914) was an Irish physician and Liberal Party politician.

== Career ==
Little was born in County Tipperary. He studied in Dublin and took the L.R.C.S. and L.R.C.P. in 1866. He practiced medicine at Woolton. Fletcher was influenced by Silas Weir Mitchell's physical methods of treatment such as massage and visited the United States.

Little studied at Cambridge and Charing Cross Hospital. He took the M.B. in 1888 and M.R.C.P. in 1899. He worked as a physician at the London Temperance Hospital and Mount Vernon Hospital. He was medical officer for Harrow. With Sir Jonathan Hutchinson he started the London post-graduate scheme which developed into the Medical Graduates' College and Polyclinic.

He was a liberal and contested Oxford in 1895. Little was inspired by James Salisbury's diet treatment and reported in 1886 that he had spent six weeks living on a diet of lean meat and hot water which made him lose a stone in weight.

== Personal life ==
Little had three sisters and five brothers. He was the brother of Reverend Robert Wentworth Little. Little was a former member of the London County Council. It was estimated that his estate was worth £19,904 in 1914.

== Selected publications ==
- Medical Rubbing (British Medical Journal, 1882)
- The Carnivorous Diet (British Medical Journal, 1886)
- Prevention Of Cancer (British Medical Journal, 1912)
- The Value of Open Spaces in Great Cities (The Hospital, 1913)
