= Evelyn Fox =

British mental health worker (1874–1955)

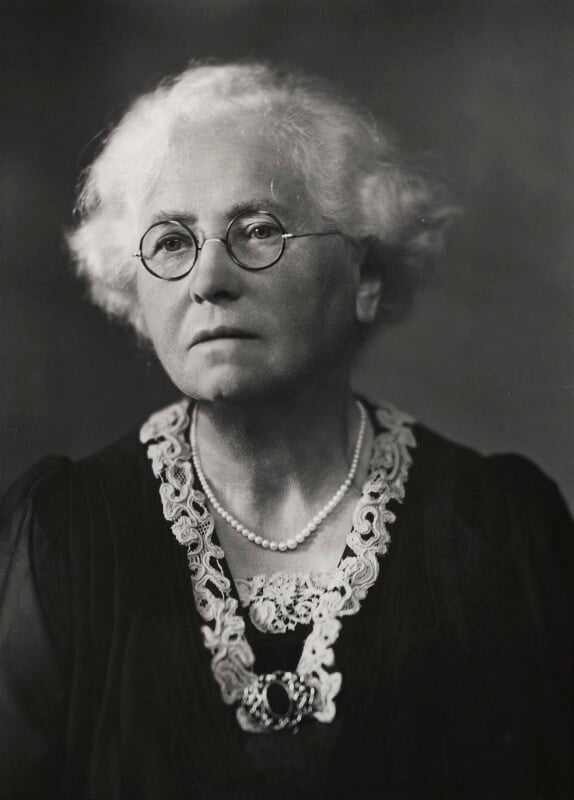
Fox in 1947

Dame Evelyn Emily Marian Fox DBE (1874–1955) was a noted British health worker, specializing in mental health and epilepsy. She studied history at Somerville College, Oxford.

Fox, who was General Secretary of the National Association for Mental Health (NAMH – now known as MIND) in the late 1940s, along with Tyler Fox (no relation), Medical Director of the Epilepsy Colony at Lingfield, Surrey and Irene Gairdner, a social science graduate from the London School of Economics, were the driving forces for the creation of the British Epilepsy Association (BEA).

== Legacy ==
Dame Evelyn Fox School, Blackburn was named in her honour. The school closed in 2000.
