= Edmund Boulnois =

British politician

- Boulnois in 1895.

Member of Parliament for Marylebone East
- In office 1889–1906
- Preceded by: Lord Charles Beresford
- Succeeded by: Lord Robert Cecil

Edmund Boulnois (17 June 1838 – 7 May 1911) was a British businessman and Conservative Party politician.

Edmund was the son of William Boulnois of St John's Wood, the proprietor of the Baker Street Bazaar, Marylebone, London . He was educated at King Edward's School, Bury St. Edmunds and St John's College, Cambridge. He graduated with a BA degree in 1862, going on to gain an MA in 1868. In 1863 he married Catherine Bennett of Great Marlow, Buckinghamshire.

He succeeded his father as owner of the Bazaar and was also chairman of the West Middlesex Waterworks Company, a director of the London Life Association and of the Westminster Electric Supply Corporation.

Boulnois was elected to the Marylebone Board of Guardians, of which he became the chairman. In 1880 he was appointed a justice of the peace for Middlesex. A member of the Conservative Party, at the 1886 general election he acted as election agent for Frederick Seager Hunt, member of parliament for Marylebone West.

The Local Government Act 1888 created a new London County Council, with the first elections held in January 1889. Boulnois was chosen by the Marylebone Constitutional Union to contest the electoral division of Marylebone West. He was elected as a member of the Conservative-backed Moderate Party, which formed the opposition group on the council.

In July 1889 the sitting Conservative member of parliament for Marylebone East, Lord Charles Beresford, resigned his seat on becoming captain of HMS Undaunted. Boulnois was chosen by the party to contest the resulting byelection. He held the seat with a majority of 493 votes, defeating the Liberal Party candidate, Granville George Leveson-Gower. Boulnois held the seat until the 1906 general election, when he retired from parliament.

When the Metropolitan Borough of St Marylebone was created in 1900, Boulnois was chosen as the borough's first mayor. He served two consecutive terms as mayor.

He visited Egypt in early 1901, and again in late 1902 for the opening of the Aswan Dam.

Boulnois maintained two residences: a town house in London's Portman Square and "Scotland", Farnham Royal, Buckinghamshire. He died at his Buckinghamshire home in May 1911, aged 72.

Parliament of the United Kingdom
Preceded by Lord Charles Beresford	Member of Parliament for Marylebone East; 1889 – 1906	Succeeded by Lord Robert Cecil
