= Cyril Jackson (educationist) =

British educationist

Sir Cyril Jackson

Sir Cyril Jackson KBE (6 February 1863 – 3 September 1924) was a British educationist, important in the development of education in Western Australia.

Jackson, the eldest son of Laurence Morris Jackson and Louisa Elizabeth Craven, was born in Dartmouth Park Road in Kentish Town. Educated at the Charterhouse School and New College, Oxford, Jackson graduated in 1885 with honours in Literae Humaniores.

He became the first Chairman of the West Guildford Roads Board (predecessor to the Town of Bassendean), the inaugural meeting of which was held in the billiard room of Jackson’s house on 12 July 1901. Official recognition of the new municipality followed a week later on 19 July 1901.

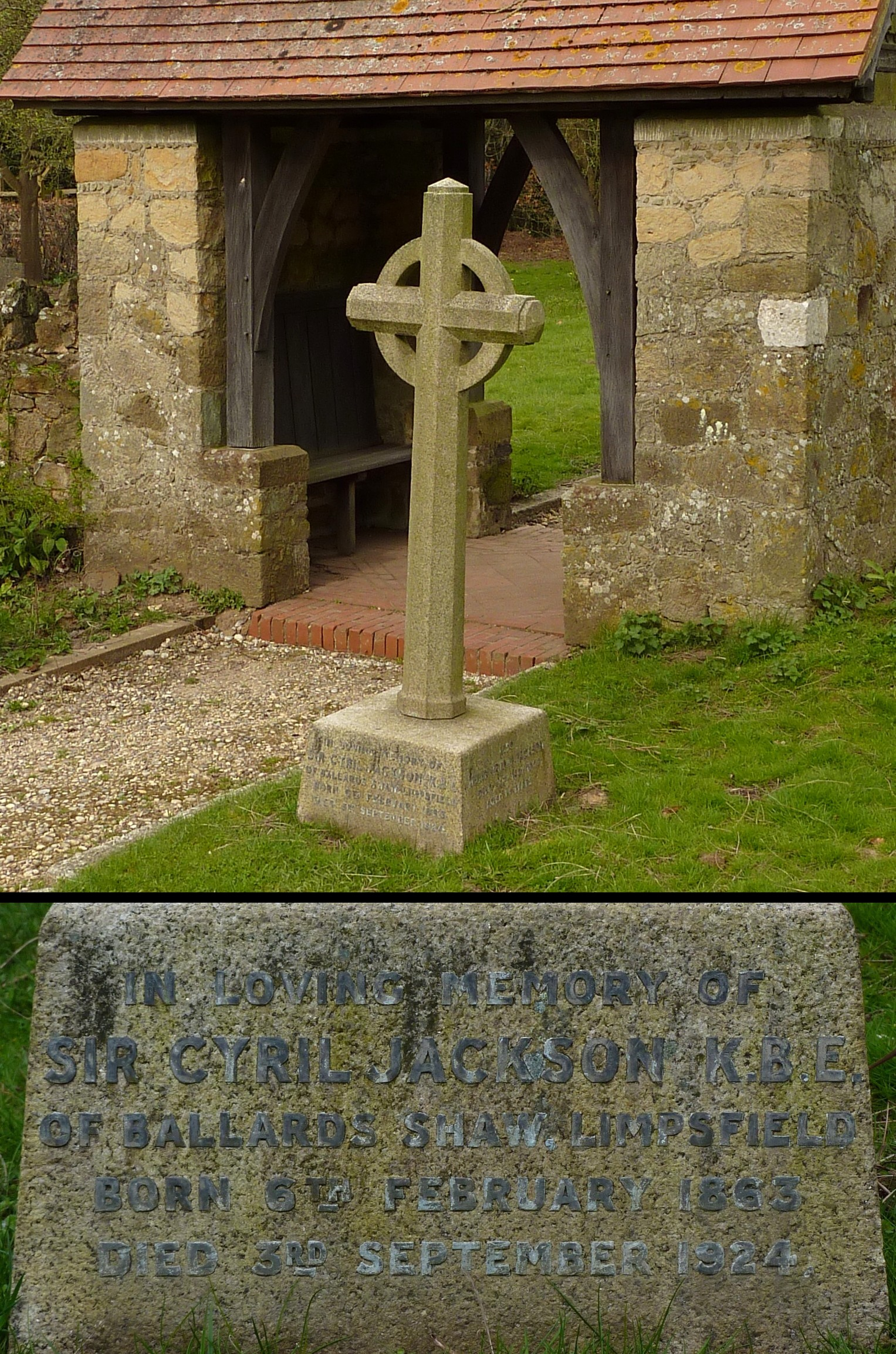
Cyril Jackson's grave at St Peter's Church in Limpsfield, Surrey, England.

Jackson was appointed a Knight Commander of the Most Excellent Order of the British Empire in 1917. He died on 3 September 1924.

Cyril Jackson Senior High School was created in Perth, Western Australia in 1961 and named in his honour.

Political offices
Preceded by Viscount Peel	Chairman of the London County Council; 1915 – 1916	Succeeded by Alfred Fowell Buxton
