= Elijah Hoole (architect) =

English architect (1837–1912)

Elijah Hoole (1837 – 27 March 1912) was an English architect of Methodist churches, settlement halls and social housing. In relation to the social housing, he worked closely with the social reformer Octavia Hill for over 40 years.

== Early life ==
Hoole was born in London in 1837 to Elijah Hoole, a Wesleyan Methodist missionary, and his wife, Elizabeth, the third daughter of the lock and safe manufacturer, Charles Chubb.

== Career ==
Hoole was a pupil of James Simpson (not to be confused with James Simpson (engineer)) in 1854, and was subsequently his assistant until he set up his own practice in 1863.

Hoole had a long working relationship with Octavia Hill: he was her "favourite" architect and worked for Hill for 40 years. Hoole employed a Ruskinian style and approach to Arts and Crafts design. In similar vein, he designed both the first university settlement, Toynbee Hall, and the only Methodist settlement, Bermondsey Settlement. He also designed Methodist churches in England, Canada and Belize.

== Selected works ==
With James Simpson:

- Wesleyan Methodist Chapel, Collingham, Notts, 1855.
- Wesley Methodist Chapel, York, 1855–56. Extant, no longer in Methodist use (now Assemblies of God use). Grade II* listed.
- Queen Street Methodist Chapel, Queen Street, Morley, 1860–61. Now Central Methodist Church, Morley. Grade II listed.

With James Wilson:

- Extensions to Kingswood School, Bath, 1882–83, and alterations to the gymnasium, 1891. Grade II listed.

On his own account:

- Sunbury Wesleyan Chapel, Staines Road East, Sunbury-on-Thames, 1865. Replaced by a modern Methodist church.
- Wesleyan Methodist Chapel, Honduras Bay, Belize City, British Honduras (now called Belize), 1865–66. Hoole's chapel replaced one destroyed by fire in 1863. It featured an unusual octagonal spire, rising above a tapering square tower with an arched external entrance. In turn, Hoole's chapel, known as Big Wesley, was destroyed in the 1931 British Honduras hurricane.

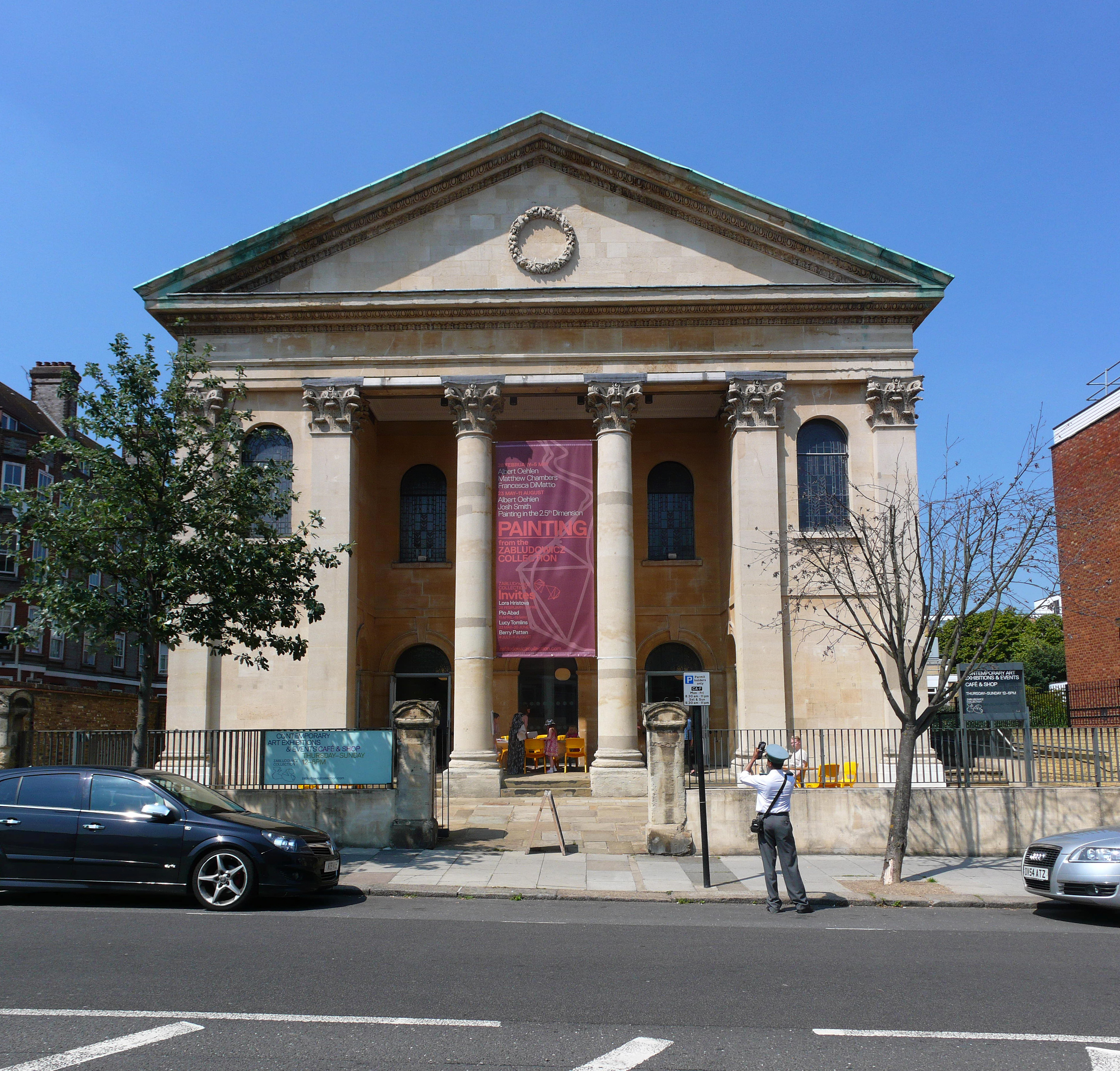
Zabludowicz Collection, formerly Wesleyan Methodist Chapel, Kentish Town

- Wesleyan Methodist Chapel, Prince of Wales Road, Kentish Town London, 1871. Extant no longer in methodist use; it housed the Zabludowicz Collection from 2007 to 2023. and has been occupied by Camden Arts Projects since 2025. Grade II listed, although in 2017 there was a planning application to demolish part of the structure
- Methodist Chapel, Naples, 1871.

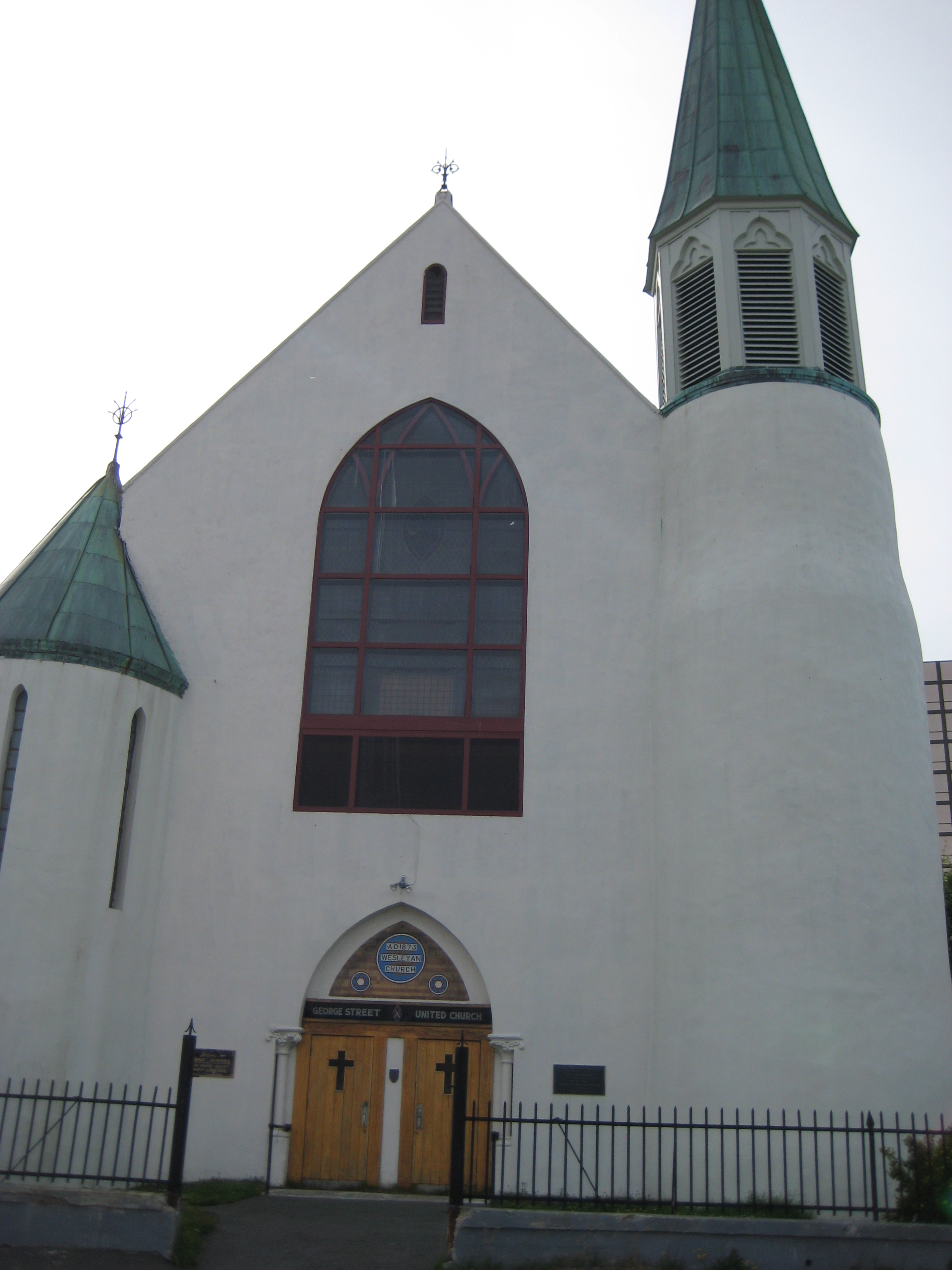
George Street United Church in St John's

- George Street Methodist Chapel, St John's, Newfoundland (now a province of Canada), 1873. Modified Gothic. Extant, now called George Street United Church.
- Industrial Dwellings, Bristol, 1875. These dwellings were built by the Bristol Industrial Dwellings Company Limited, founded by the philanthropist Susanna Winkworth.
- Larksfield, Crockham Hill, Westerham, Kent, 1877. Hoole designed Larksfield for Octavia Hill and her companion Harriot Yorke as their country residence. Grade II listed.
- Surrey Lodge Dwellings, Kennington Road and Lambeth Road, London, 1879–84. The dwellings were built on the site of Sir James Wyatt's former home, Surrey Lodge. Two of the occupants were the social reformer Emma Cons and her niece Lilian Baylis (see Old Vic, below). They were destroyed by bomb damage during WWII. The site is now the Waterloo Hub Hotel.
- The Old Vic Theatre, Waterloo Road, London SE1, 1880 and 1902. The Old Vic was built in 1816–18 and remodelled in 1871. The social reformer Emma Cons acquired the disreputable theatre, and, after Hoole remodelled it, opened it as the Royal Victoria Hall and Coffee Tavern. He remodelled it again in 1902, although the Old Vic (as it once again became known) has subsequently been altered a number of times since. Grade II* listed.
- Holly Park Wesleyan Chapel, Crouch Hill, London, 1881. The chapel replaced a tin tabernacle; in turn it was demolished in 1961 and replaced by a modern church in 1962.

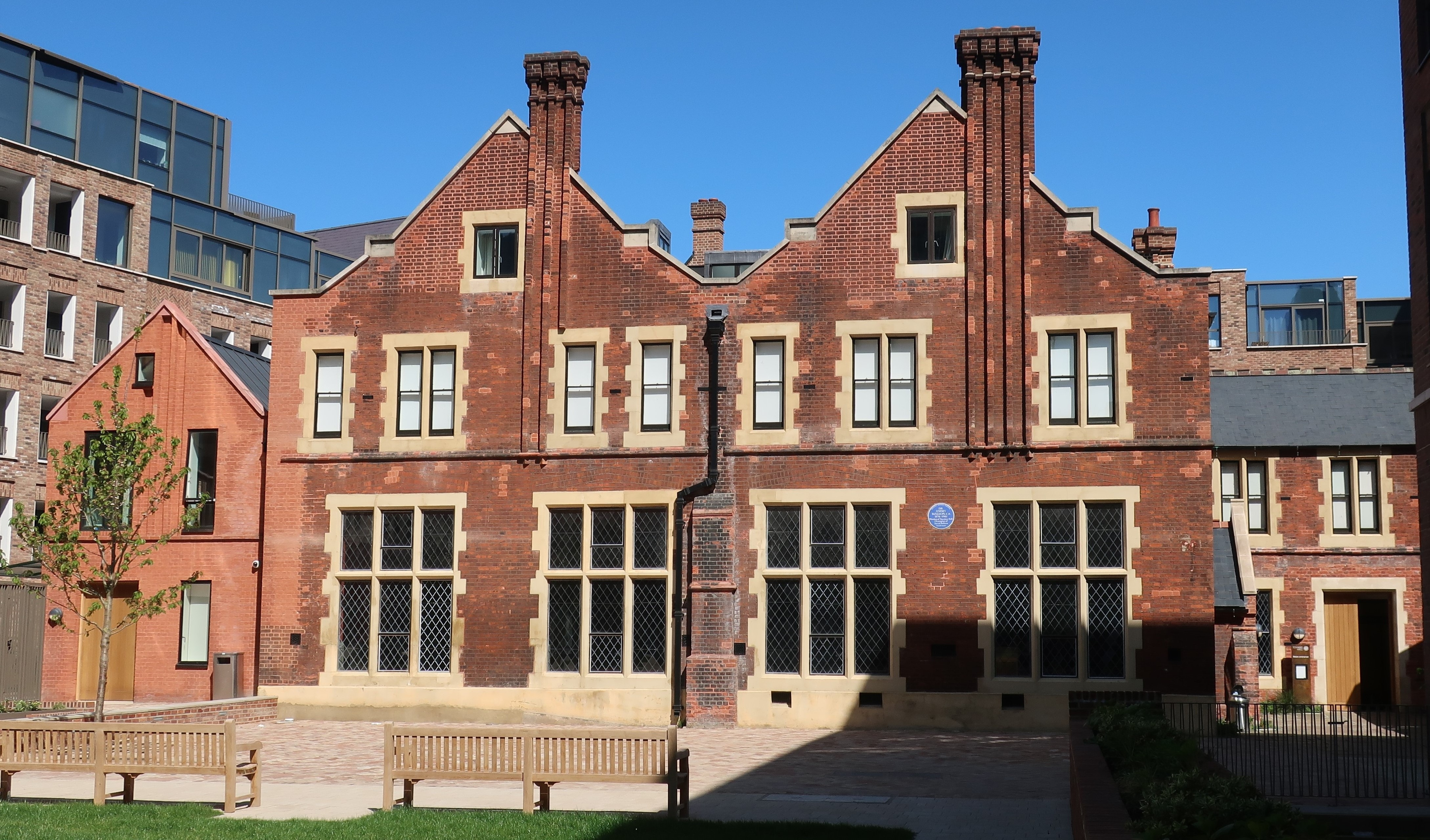
Toynbee Hall

- Toynbee Hall, Commercial Street, London, 1884. Hoole designed Toynbee Hall, the first of the university settlements, for the social reformers Samuel and Henrietta Barnett; the architectural style is Vicarage Gothic. It is Grade II listed. A related building was College East. All but one bay of the façade of College East was demolished when Attlee House was built in 1971; in turn that was demolished in 2016 and the façade now fronts its replacement, Gatsby Apartments.

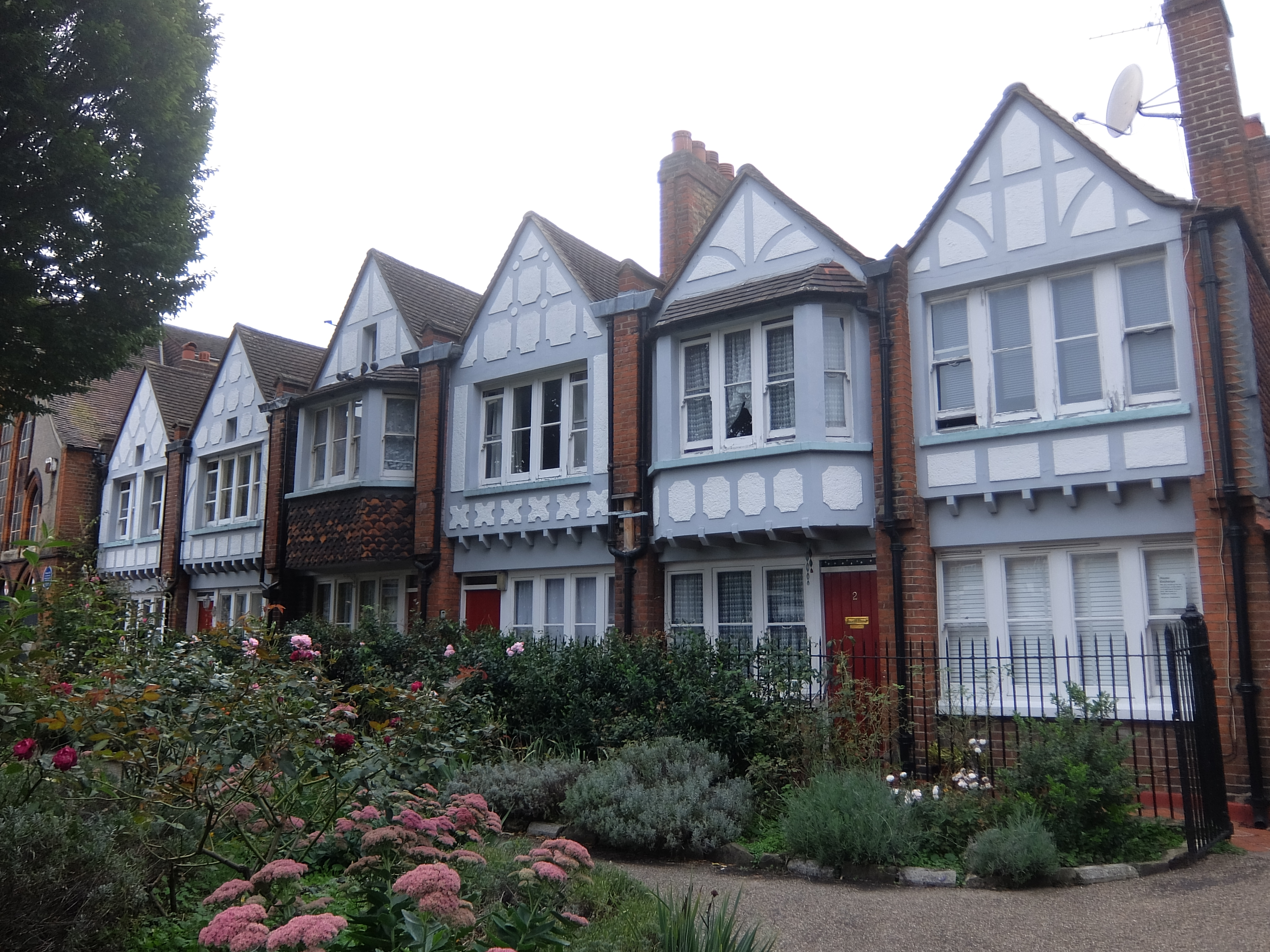
Redcross Cottages from Red Cross Garden

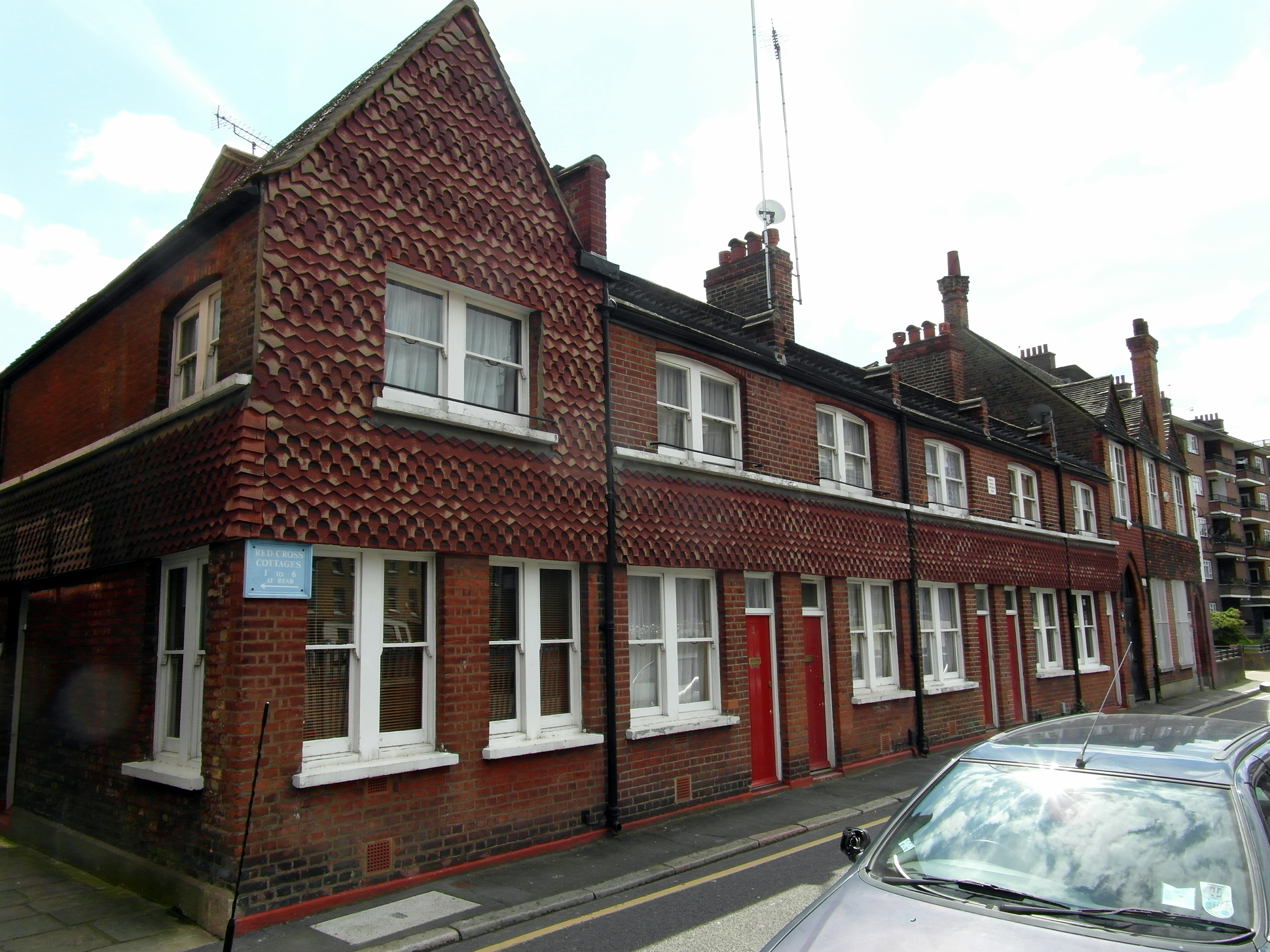
Whitecross Cottages on Ayres Street

- Redcross Cottages and Whitecross Cottages, Southwark, London, 1888–90. Social housing complex built adjacent to Octavia Hill's Red Cross Garden. First to be built, in 1888, were the Tudor revival row of houses facing the garden, known as Redcross Cottages. Whitecross Cottages were built in an Arts and Crafts style in 1890 behind Redcross Cottages on Ayres Street. Adjacent to Redcross Cottages is the community hall, then called Red Cross Hall, and now called Bishop's Hall, and in private ownership. In 1889 Hill and Hoole commissioned Walter Crane to decorate the interior with ten deeds of heroism in the daily life of ordinary people, of which three were executed and survive. Each of the two rows of cottages is Grade II listed, as is the hall.

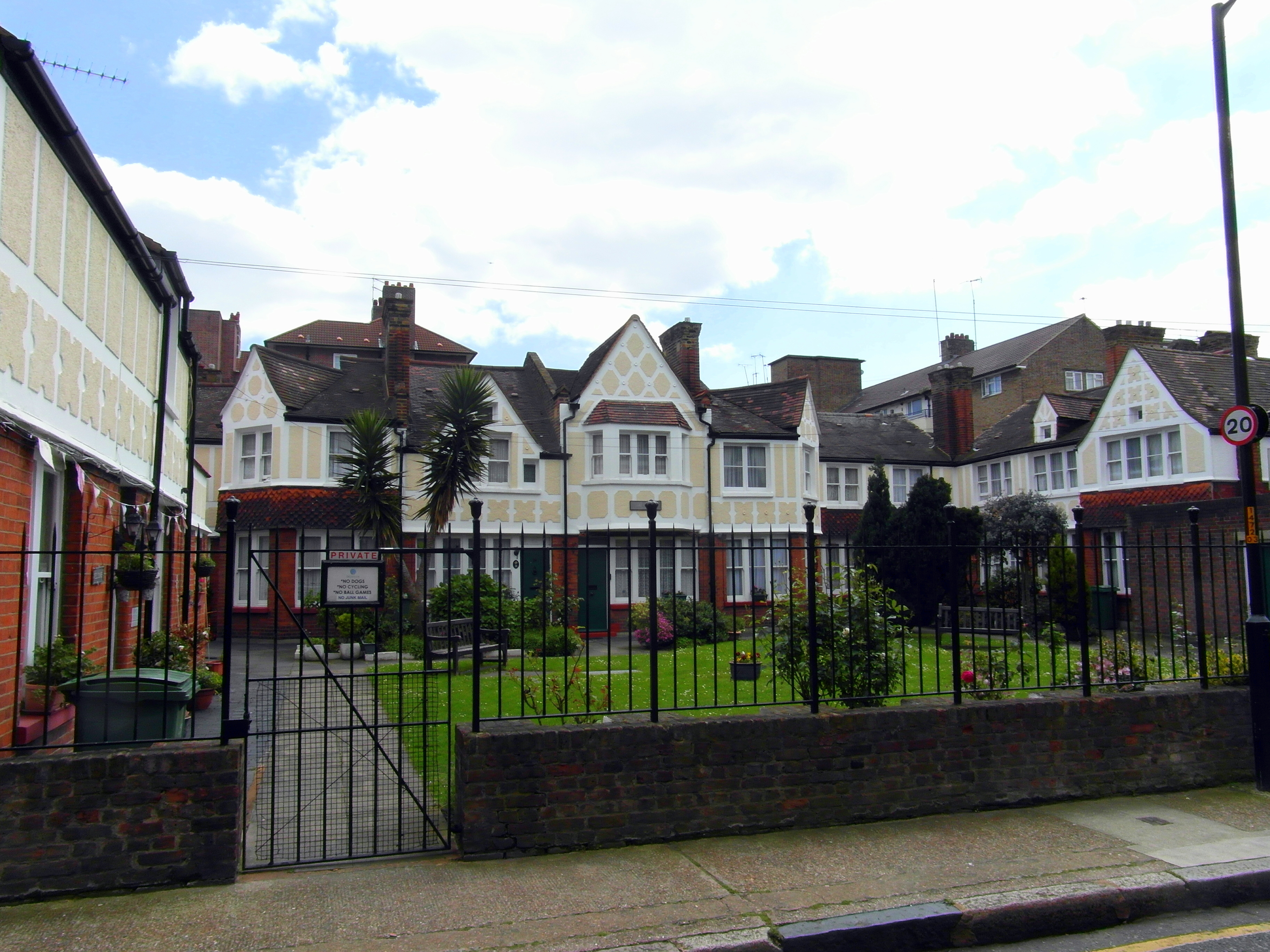
Gable Cottages on Sudrey Street

- Gable Cottages, Sudrey Street, Southwark, London, 1889. Arts and Crafts Tudor style cottages. Grade II listed.

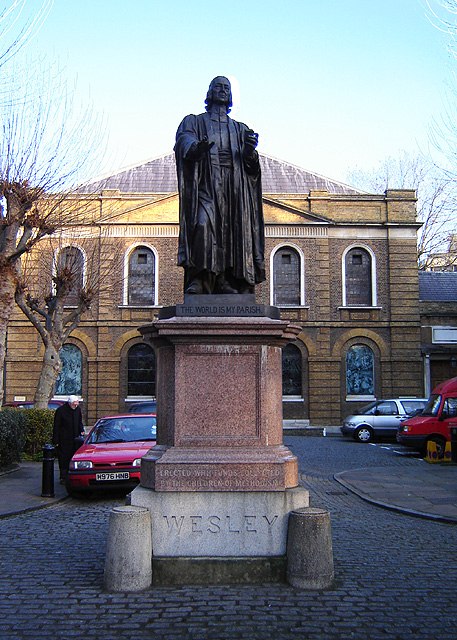
Statue of John Wesley by John Adams-Acton on a pedestal by Elijah Hoole

- Restoration of Wesley's Chapel, City Road, London, 1891. The chapel, known as "the Mother Church of World Methodism", dates from 1777–78, with a portico added in 1814–15. Hoole was responsible for its restoration in 1891, during which rusticated piers, quoins and cornice to the outer bays, and architraves to the upper windows were added. At the same time as the restoration took place, a statue of John Wesley was installed. The statue was by John Adams-Acton; Hoole was responsible for the 10 foot high granite pedestal. Grade I listed.
- 9A Gainsborough Gardens (originally Eirene Cottage), Hampstead, London, 1891. Vernacular revival detached house built for the historian and barrister Charles Edmund Maurice, who was also Octavia Hill's brother-in-law. Grade II listed.
- Bermondsey Settlement, Bermondsey, London, 1892. Bermondsey Settlement was the only Methodist settlement; it was founded by Hoole's nephew, the Rev John Scott Lidgett. The settlement closed in 1967 and was demolished in 1969.
- Gower Street Methodist Chapel, St John's, Newfoundland (now a province of Canada), 1892–96. Extant, now Gower Street United Church. The chapel, which replaced one destroyed by the Great Fire of 1892, was intended to rival the Catholic and Anglican cathedrals and is mostly of a Romanesque design.
- Ranston Street Cottages, Lisson Grove, Paddington, London, 1895. Built for Octavia Hill, and still owned by the Octavia Housing Trust. Originally called the St Botolph Cottages and Almond Cottages. Grade II listed (two listings). The cottages were built to replace the slums, which were so notoriously unpleasant that they were the location of the Eliza Armstrong scandal in 1885, when a 13 year old girl was bought for prostitution in order to expose the evils of white slavery.
- St James-the-Less, Bethnal Green, London, 1897. St James the Less was built in 1840–42, to a design by Lewis Vulliamy. In 1897 Hoole undertook some repairs and reseating. These were lost during wartime bomb damage in 1940 and the subsequent rebuilding by J. Antony Lewis in 1960–61. Grade II listed.
- Fletcher Memorial College and Chapel, Lausanne, Switzerland, unknown date.

== Personal life ==
Hoole married Judith Lidgett in 1868 at St John the Evangelist, Blackheath. His wife was an aunt of the founder of the Bermondsey Settlement, John Scott Lidgett. They had nine children, of whom two sons Elijah (born 1872) and George (born 1874) both practised for a time as architects. Hoole died in 1912, aged 74, and was buried on the western side of Highgate Cemetery. His grave (no.38653) no longer has a headstone.
