= Bankside Open Spaces Trust =

Bankside Open Spaces Trust (BOST) is a horticulture, gardening and management of urban open space charity, based in Bankside, the southern bank by the River Thames, Southwark, Central London, England. BOST works local communities and organisations in London, such as Tate Modern community garden, to improve, create and enjoy the parks, gardens, green spaces, and, passive and active recreation areas.

The charity supports a network of parks, community managed green spaces and open spaces groups to carry out consultation, fundraise and oversee improvements. This includes help with choosing new play equipment, bespoke garden design and developing new areas, making accessible improvements and re-landscaping.

BOST initiates and runs community gardening clubs, award small grants for local horticulture projects and organises hiring out parks and open spaces for celebratory public and private events. BOST has set up a community garden resource centre with a pond and encourages people to grow their own food - vegetables, herbs, fruit trees and bushes - through 'edible projects', utilising raised-bed gardening and planting. They also provide informal horticultural training, landscape maintenance, garden maintenance, grounds maintenance and gardening work experience in the local parks, gardens and open spaces.

== History ==
Founded in 2000, the charitable work of BOST is based in Red Cross Garden, London's first pocket park, and an 1887 Victorian creation of Octavia Hill, the English social reformer. Hill also championed providing green and open spaces to people, and helped to save London's Hampstead Heath and Parliament Hill Fields from being built on. He was one of the three founders of the National Trust. Two key early supporters of BOST (particularly in inspiring London-based companies to contribute to and support their local open spaces) were Vicky Lawrence, who was the first BOST Executive Director, having previously helped to set up the Community Chest Grant Scheme for local people in 1998, and Norman Powell, a Co-Founder & Trustee of BOST. The former MP Simon Hughes who represented Bermondsey and Old Southwark for 32 years commented in his preface to the launch of BOST's June 2002 publication "In My Backyard - Growing a sense of place in Bankside" that 'Life is increasingly pressured and a rush. To enjoy the city in all its infinite variety means that our open spaces need as many of us as possible to look after and support them'.

Located between Tower Bridge, Southwark, and Waterloo, Lambeth, districts of Central London, England, these areas have few parks and open spaces and BOST works to enhance and make sure that they meet the needs of local communities.

== Gardens & Open Spaces ==
Londoners, local workers and tourists use the parks and community gardens each day.

BOST spaces are open and free to explore and widely used for everyone and by people and organisations hosting outdoor events such as, community projects, fetes, festivals, parties, film hire, photo shoots, sports activities and tournaments, and corporate events. Bankside Open Spaces Trust (BOST) manages parks and gardens, conserving the spaces. BOST look after the following:

=== Red Cross Garden ===
Located just south from the famous farmers market at Borough Market, one of the largest and oldest wholesale and retail food market in Southwark, Central London, England. Red Cross Garden was laid out in 1887 and is a key element in what is considered to be one of Octavia Hill's finest environmental and social schemes. She wanted to create what she referred to as 'open air sitting rooms'. Three elements together improved the lives of those living in squalid, wretched Southwark at the time - The Garden, The Hall, The Cottages.

=== Waterloo Millennium Green ===
Across the road from The Old Vic theatre or a 1-minute walk from Waterloo station in London situated on the corner of The Cut and Waterloo Road. There are wildflowers, dragonflies hovering over the pond with seating and a separate cascading rock water feature.

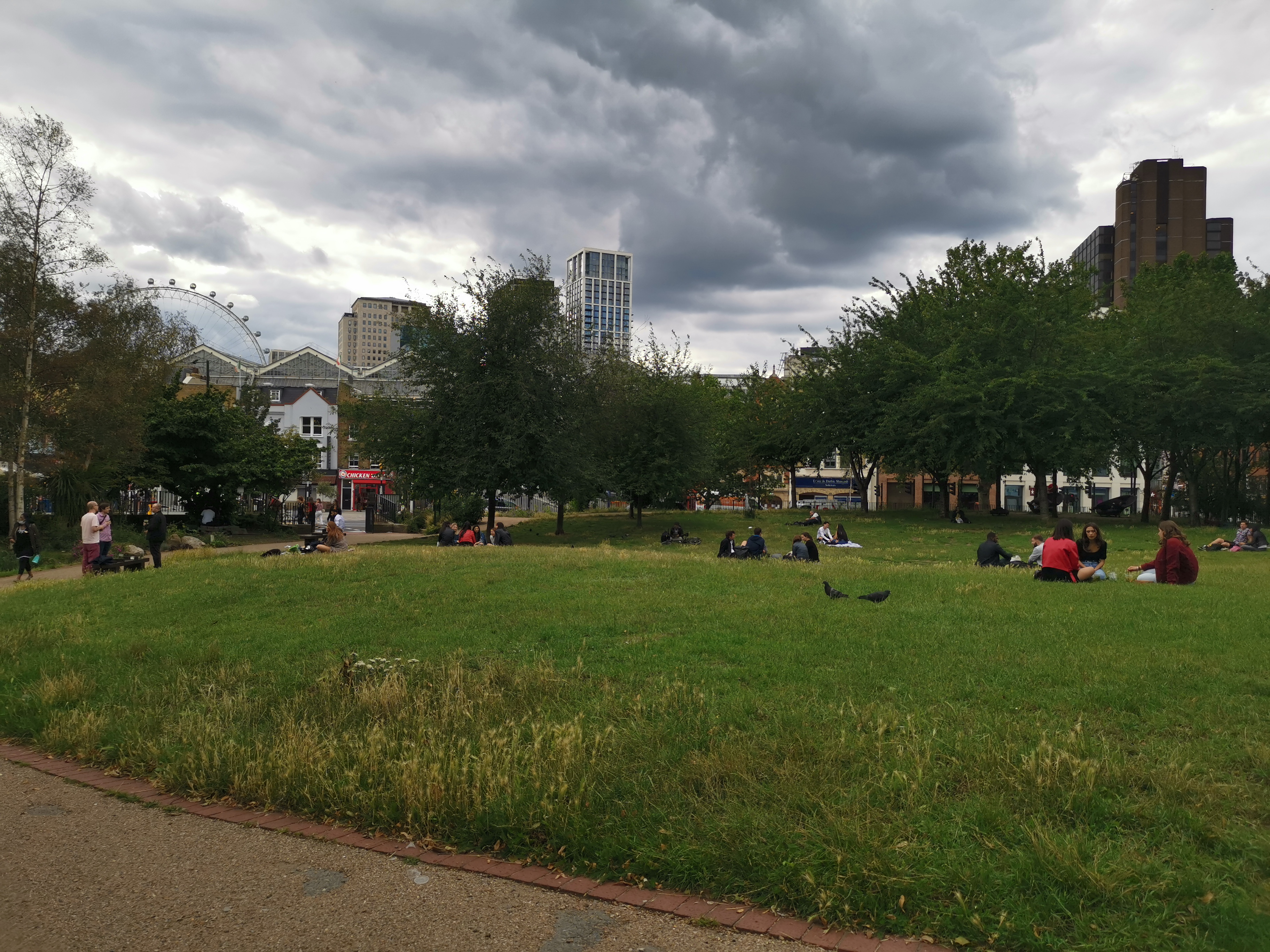
Waterloo Millennium Green

=== The Marlborough Sports Gardens ===
The Marlborough Sports Garden is located in Union Street off of Borough High Street in the London Borough of Southwark where also in the vicinity literary greats such as Chaucer, Shakespeare and Charles Dickens gained inspiration for their works. Historically the Duchess of Marlborough in 1919 decreed that 'Surplus land from an insanitary area between Borough High Street and Redcross Street should be used as a recreation ground'.

== Partners and funders ==
The organisation is supported by a number of local and national charitable foundations serving the region, and several of the major London Livery Companies. It has projects in cooperation with the Tate Modern and other London organisations.

- Bankside Urban Forest
- BTCV
- City Bridge Trust
- EDF Energy
- Friends of Hatfield Green
- Heritage Lottery Fund
- UK Home Office
- Living Spaces
- London Borough of Southwark
- Metropolitan Public Gardens Association
- Nationwide Foundation
- Royal Society for the Conservation of Nature
- Southwark's Biodiversity Action Partnership
- Worshipful Company of Goldsmiths Charities
- Worshipful Company of Mercers
- Waterloo Community Development Group
- Waterloo Quarter Business Alliance
- and others in Waterloo Open Spaces Partnership
