= Morry Davis =

Morris Harold Davis (7 November 1894 – 15 March 1985) was a British politician, who also served as President of the Federation of Synagogues.

== Biography ==
Born in St George's-in-the-East, in the East End of London, Davis served an apprenticeship as a tailor, then in 1921 became the manager of the Brown Bear pub, which was owned by his father. He joined the Labour Party, and in 1921 was elected as an alderman on Stepney Metropolitan Borough Council. He also stood for Whitechapel and St George's at the 1922 London County Council election, missing out on election by 87 votes, winning the seat easily in 1925.

Davis won an elected seat on Stepney Council at a by-election in 1924. Now a prominent local figure, he was appointed to four council committees within his first six months, and by 1928 he chaired the council's education, finance, markets, and valuation committees. That year, he made a popular decision to reduce the gap between market stalls, allowing more to be set up, despite this being in violation of national law. He also won a series of libel cases against newspapers which had incorrectly associated him with corrupt electoral practices, namely paying hackney carriages to take voters to the polling station.

Davis was active in the Federation of Synagogues, and became a leading figure in the opposition to its unpopular anti-socialist leader, Louis Montagu. Montagu was ousted in 1925, and Davis then began chairing meetings of the federation, also becoming treasurer of its associated burial society. In this role, he championed donations to the Jewish National Fund and the Keren Hayesod, the first major Jewish organisation in the UK to donate to Zionist causes. After a couple of years with no president, Davis narrowly won the office in 1928, and he used the office to centralise the organisation, support Zionist causes, and help Jewish refugees from Nazism. He succeeded in attracting more synagogues to affiliate, but his willingness to act outside the organisation's constitution and postpone elections to its council were controversial.

Davis became the leader of Stepney Council in 1935, building a coalition of working class Jewish and Irish Catholic voters. However, the Spanish Civil War proved challenging, with Davis supporting the Republicans, but many Catholic voters supporting the Nationalists. While opposed to fascism, Davis did not take part in the Battle of Cable Street, and even voted to permit the British Union of Fascists to hold meetings in Limehouse Town Hall.

Under Davis' leadership, concerns grew that Stepney Council was inefficient, and that Davis was turning a blind eye to corruption. He was dropped from the London County Council at the 1934 election, although he regained a seat in 1937, after his successor was imprisoned for theft. He continued a range of popular initiatives, including condemning the release of Oswald Mosley from prison, but was criticised for failing to construct air raid shelters, and in 1940 was stripped of his responsibility for civil defence.

In 1944, Davis travelled by train without a ticket. When caught, he gave a false name, and to support this, he persuaded a council official to forge an identity card in the name of "Harold Green". The ruse was unsuccessful, and he was sentenced to six months in prison. On release, he retired to Stamford Hill and led an isolated life, dying in 1985.

Civic offices
Preceded by Henry James Lazarus	Mayor of Stepney; 1930–1931	Succeeded by Miriam Moses
Non-profit organization positions
Preceded by Louis Montagu	President of the Federation of Synagogues; 1928–1944	Succeeded by Aaron Wright
