= Red Cross Garden, Southwark =

Park in Southwark, London

Coordinates: 51°30′11″N 0°05′41″W

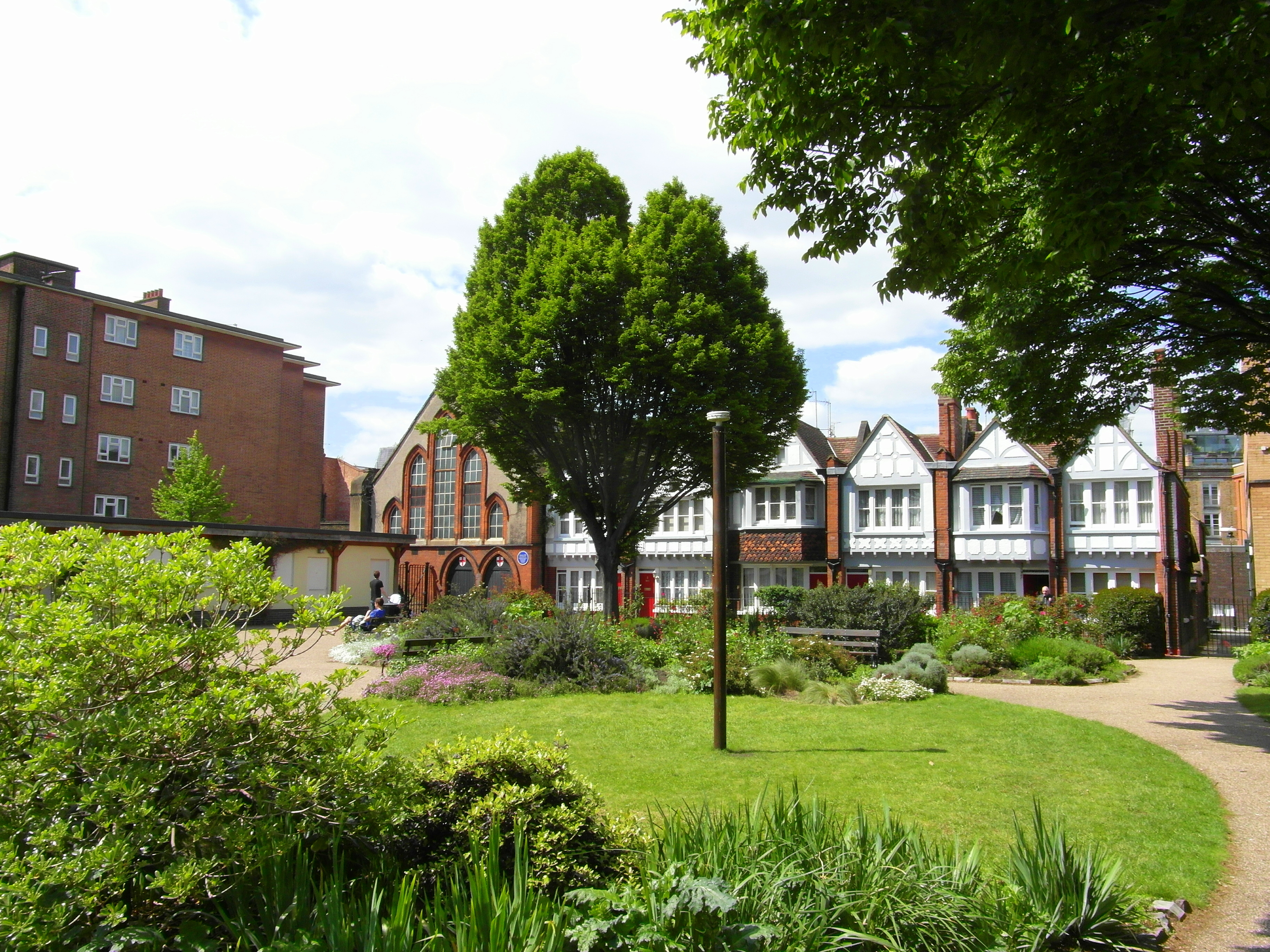
Red Cross Garden

Red Cross Garden is a small park in Southwark, London. It is located on Redcross Way, and named after the street, although the name of the garden is spelt with two words while the street is spelt with one. It is in the London Borough of Southwark. The garden and the associated cottages designed by Elijah Hoole form an early example of one of Octavia Hill’s social housing schemes.

== Origins ==
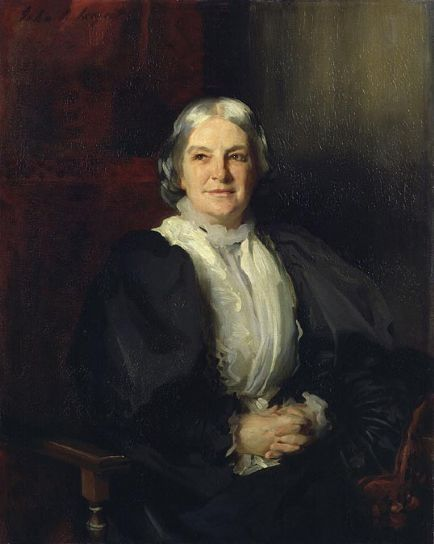
Octavia Hill by John Singer Sargent in the National Portrait Gallery, London

The social reformer Octavia Hill is best known for being a co-founder of the National Trust but was also an active campaigner for the provision of social housing, attendant community facilities and the availability of public open space. Red Cross Garden was her pioneer social housing scheme, built on the site of a former paper factory and hop warehouse. The garden itself was the first part of the development to be undertaken. It was funded by Julia, Countess of Ducie, and the Kyrle Society, and was laid out in 1887 by Emmeline Sieveking working with Fanny Wilkinson, the landscape gardener of the Metropolitan Public Gardens Association. It formally opened in 1888. The original layout consisted of curved lawns, flower beds and serpentine paths, with an ornamental pond and fountain, a bandstand, and a children’s play area. There were two plane trees.

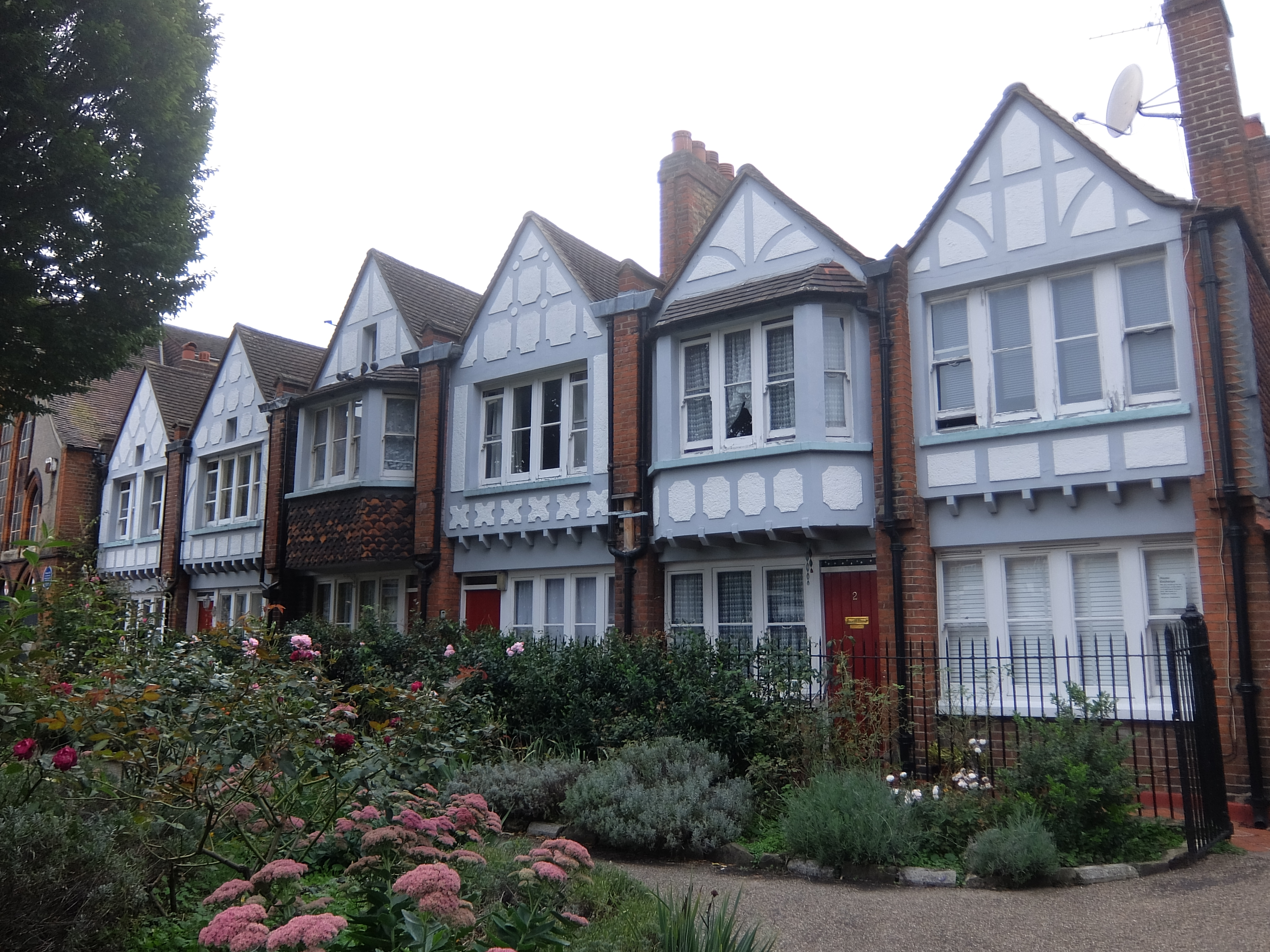
Redcross Cottages from Red Cross Garden

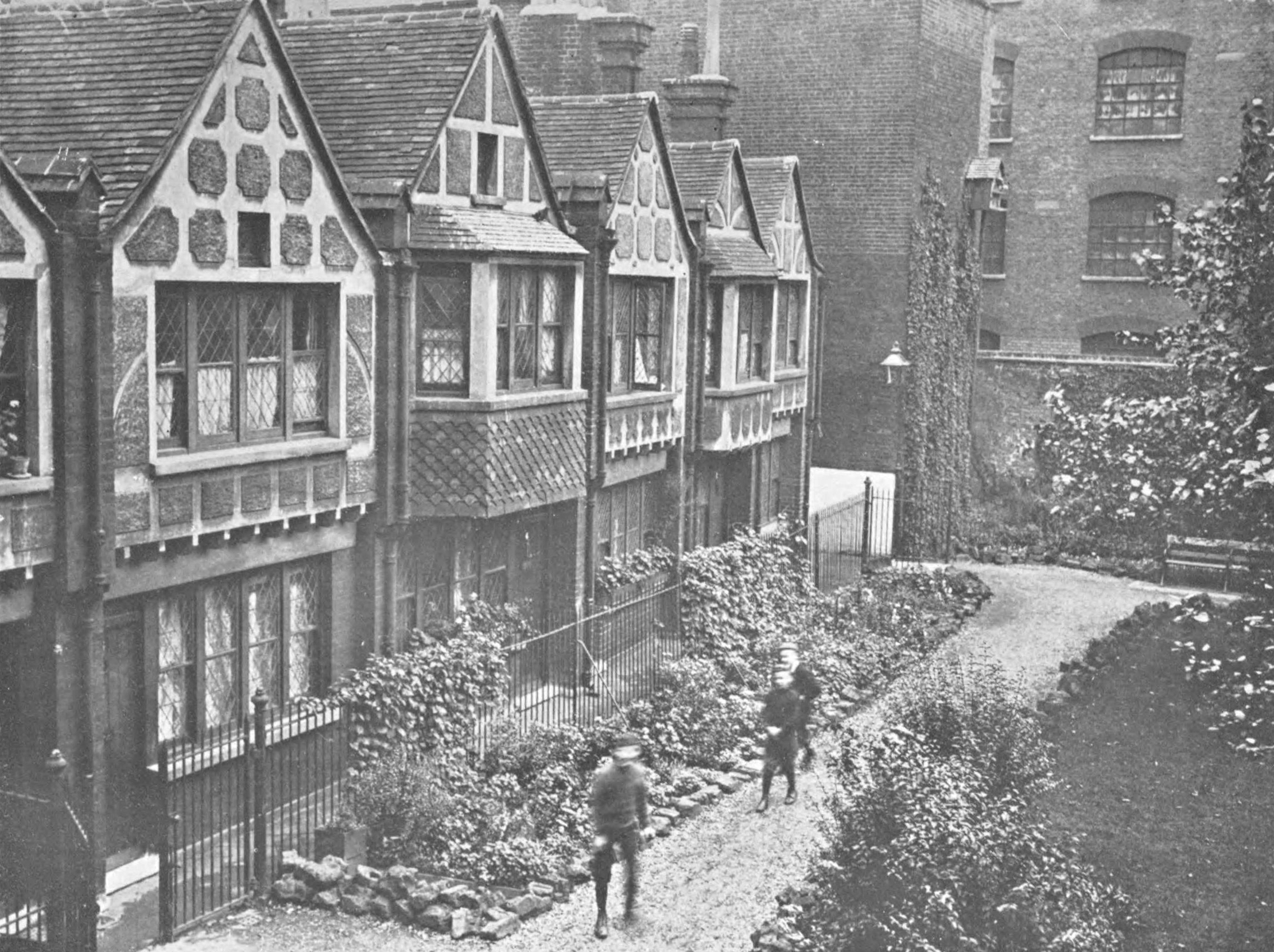
Redcross Cottages and Red Cross Garden in 1913

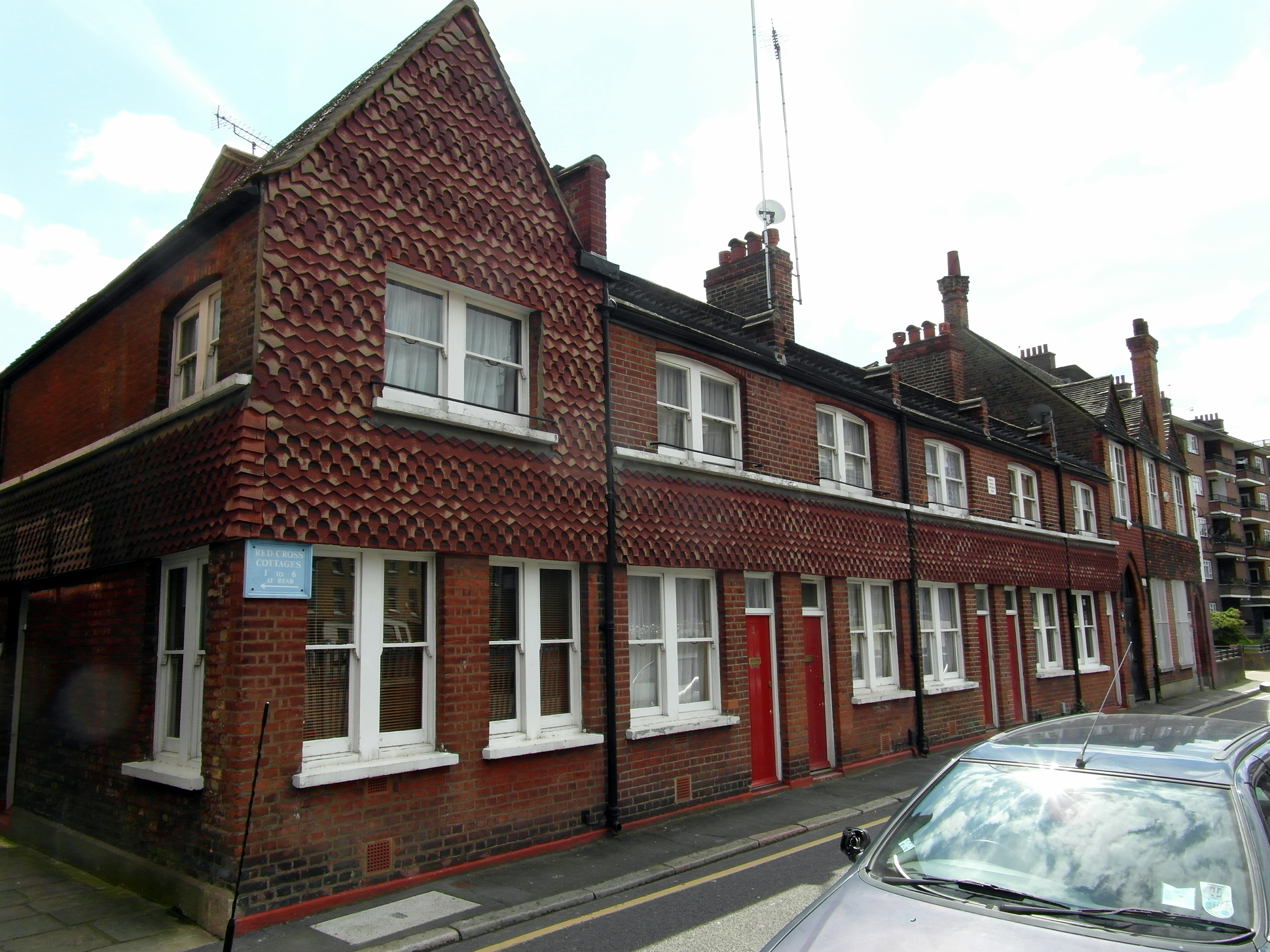
Whitecross Cottages on Ayres Street

The adjacent buildings were all designed by Elijah Hoole. First to be built, in 1888, were the Tudor revival row of houses facing the garden, known as Redcross Cottages. Whitecross Cottages were built in an Arts and Crafts style in 1890 behind Redcross Cottages on Ayres Street. Adjacent to Redcross Cottages is the community hall, originally called Red Cross Hall, and now called Bishop's Hall, and in private ownership. In 1889 Hill and Hoole commissioned Walter Crane to decorate the interior with ten deeds of heroism in the daily life of ordinary people, of which three were executed and survive.

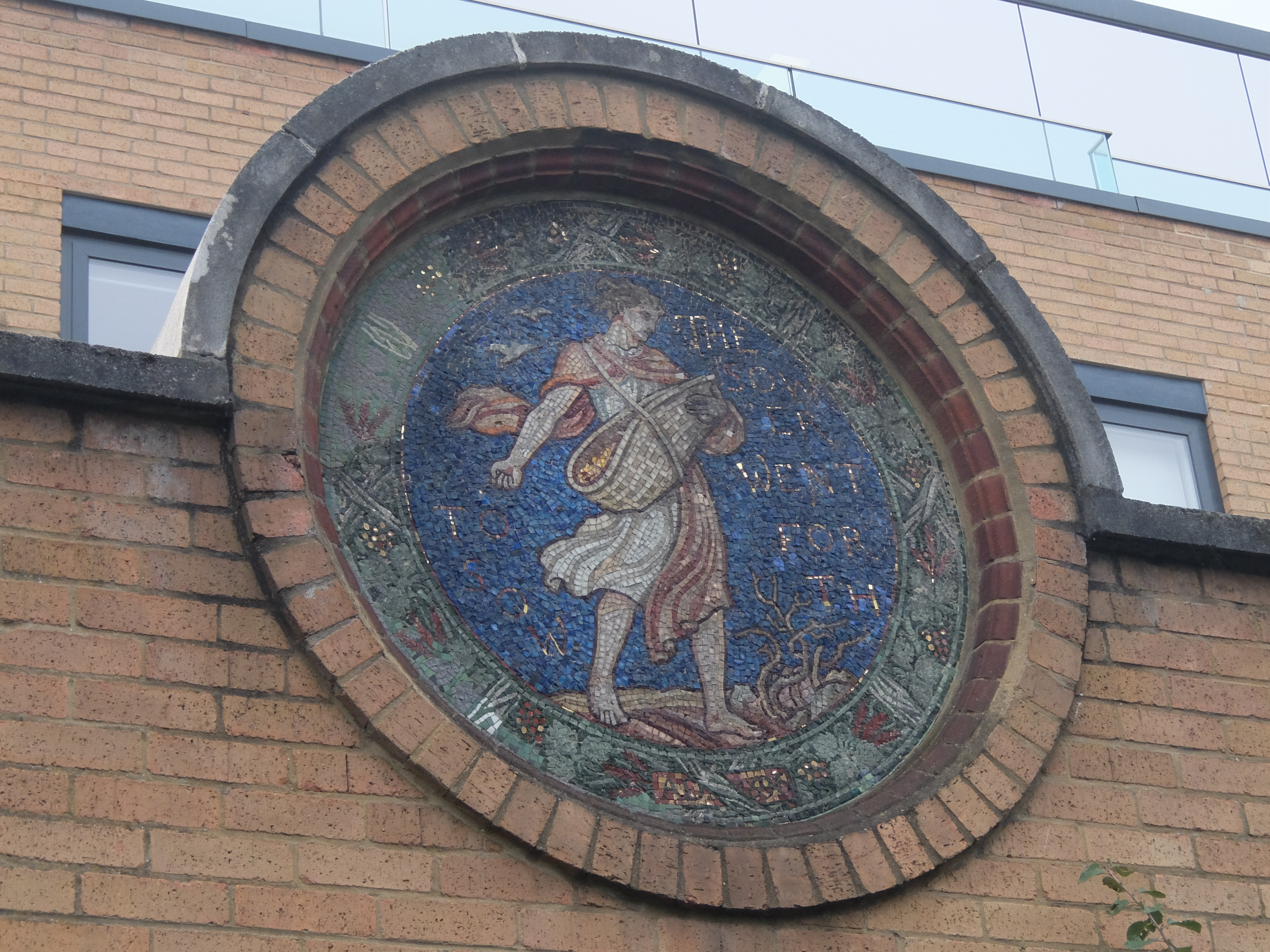
The Sower mosaic, by James Powell and Sons, on Octavia House

Two mosaics were donated by the Myatt's Fields philanthropist Julia Minet and installed by Hill in 1896. The mosaics were The Sower, by the glass-makers James Powell and Sons after a design by Louisa, Marchioness of Waterford, and The Good Shepherd, by Antonio Salviati. The Good Shepherd has since been lost, but The Sower survives, having been restored first in 1956 and again in 2005. It is now mounted on a modern building, Octavia House (occupied by the Royal College of Emergency Medicine), which is built on the former children's play area.

Each of the two rows of cottages is Grade II listed, as is the hall, and the mosaic on Octavia House (but not the building itself).

In 1928 the garden was still described as attractively laid out but all was lost during WWII, and in 1948 Sir Sydney Cockerell described a desolate flat space, newly asphalted. Some minor planting occurred, but until 2005 it was largely an area of grass with tarmac.

== Restoration ==
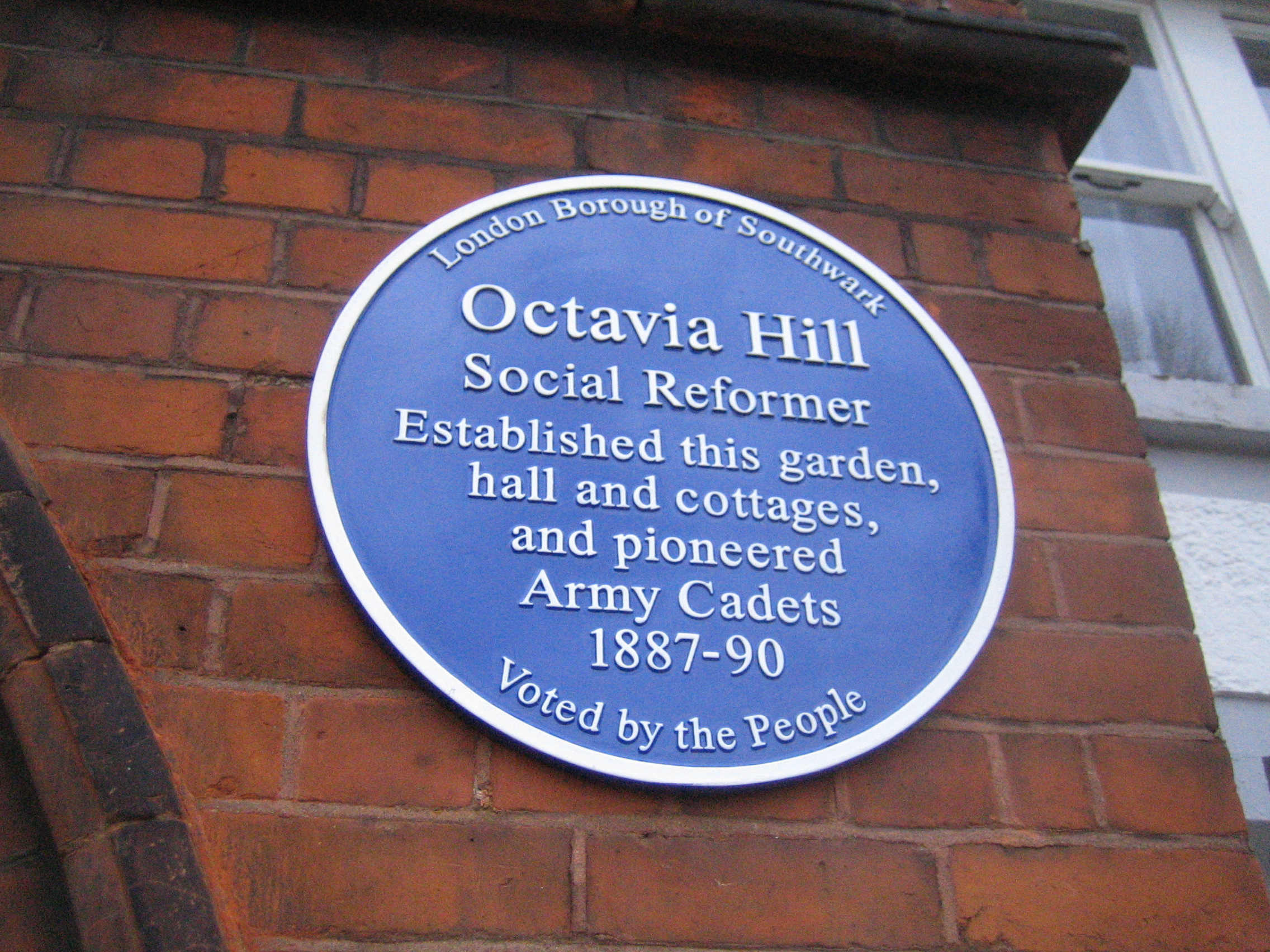
Octavia Hill blue plaque

The garden was restored to its original Victorian layout in 2005 by the Bankside Open Spaces Trust and formally reopened by the Princess Royal in 2006. A modern mosaic was also installed in 2005. In 2007 a London Borough of Southwark blue plaque to Hill was installed on the hall. In 2016 it was described by The Daily Telegraph as one of London’s best secret gardens.

The garden is available for hire for weddings.
