= Christopher John Kelly =

British politician and trade unionist

Christopher John Kelly (10 December 1888 – 1943) was a British politician and trade unionist, who served on London County Council, but was later convicted of theft.

Born in Lambeth, Kelly worked on the railways and became prominent in the National Union of Railwaymen (NUR). In his youth, he was a keen footballer, and captained the Northern United team when it won the Railway Challenge Cup three years in a row.

He was a supporter of the Labour Party and was elected to Poplar Borough Council in 1919, representing Bromley North East, holding the seat until 1928. Also in 1919, he was elected to the Metropolitan Water Board, while he served on the Poplar Board of Guardians for six years. He was a supporter of the Poplar Rates Rebellion in 1921, but unlike many of the local councillors, he was not imprisoned.

At the 1922 London County Council election, Kelly was elected in Whitechapel and St George's. He later claimed that, after the declaration, he had only 2d remaining, just sufficient to pay his tram fare home. He stood for Bethnal Green North East at the 1929 United Kingdom general election, and took second place, with 38.7% of the vote. At the 1935 United Kingdom general election, he stood in Norwich, but took only fourth place, with 17.8% of the vote.

After his defeat in Norwich, Kelly's political expenses were no longer covered by the NUR and Labour Party, but Kelly continued to speak on behalf of the party. This led him into financial difficulties, and in October 1936 he stole jewellery from luggage he was transporting across London. The passenger owning the luggage lived in Edinburgh and reported the theft to police there. When Kelly attended a Labour Party conference in Edinburgh later in the month, he attempted to sell some of the jewellery; this was identified by local police, and he was arrested. In court, he admitted to similar offences committed over a three-month period, and he was sentenced to three months in prison.
