= Bermondsey Settlement =

Coordinates: 51.499°N 0.065°W

The Bermondsey Settlement was a settlement house founded in Bermondsey, South-East London, by the Rev'd John Scott Lidgett. It was the only Methodist foundation among the settlements that appeared in the late 19th and early 20th century. Like other settlement houses it offered social, health and educational services to the poor of its neighbourhood. It was particularly concerned with educational matters (Lidgett was a prominent educationist) including music and dance. It is noted for the work of one of its residents, Grace Kimmins, in relation to children's play. Other notable residents included the radical nonconformist Hugh Price Hughes, Grace Kimmins' husband Charles William Kimmins, English socialist and pacifist Ada Salter, and doctor and political radical Alfred Salter.

The settlement opened in 1892. The architect of the main building was Elijah Hoole, who had also built Toynbee Hall some years earlier. It was closed in 1967 and the building was demolished two years later.
