= John Scott Lidgett =

Methodist theologian (1854–1953)

The Reverend John Scott Lidgett CH
- Lidgett in 1907

President of the Methodist Conference
- In office 1908–1909
- Preceded by: John Smith Simon
- Succeeded by: William Perkins
- In office 1932–1933
- Vice President: Sir Robert William Perks
- Preceded by: Dr Henry Maldwyn Hughes
- Succeeded by: Frederick Luke Wiseman

Personal details
- Born: 10 August 1854 Lewisham, England
- Died: 16 June 1953 (aged 98) Epsom, England
- Occupation: Methodist theologian

John Scott Lidgett, CH (10 August 1854 – 16 June 1953) was a British Wesleyan Methodist minister and educationist. He achieved prominence both as a theologian and reformer within British Methodism, stressing the importance of the church's engagement with the whole of society and human culture, and as an effective advocate for education within London. Lidgett was also a prominent leader of the Wesley Guild. He served as the first President of the Methodist Conference in 1932–33.

== Life ==
He was born in Lewisham, the son of John Jacob Lidgett, a shipowner, and Maria Elizabeth Scott. His maternal grandfather John Scott (1792–1868) was a prominent Wesleyan Methodist, a founder and first Principal of Westminster Training College.

Lidgett was educated at University College, London, entering in 1873, taking his BA in 1874 and his MA in 1875; he was awarded a DD by the University of Aberdeen on the strength of a book published in 1902, The Fatherhood of God.

In later life Lidgett was closely involved with the University of London, serving on its Senate from 1922 until he retired in 1946 at the age of 92. He served as deputy vice-chancellor and as vice-chancellor from 1930 to 1932. He was active in supporting the development of women's colleges and, through his support for the university's relations with teacher training colleges, was instrumental in the foundation of its Institute of Education.

Lidgett died in a nursing home at Epsom on 16 June 1953. He was buried at West Norwood Cemetery.

== Theology ==
By the standards of 19th-century British Methodism, Lidgett's theology was liberal; he rejected the penal substitution doctrine of the atonement, and wanted to move his denomination away from its inherited tendency to a narrow evangelical stance, towards a social gospel. He founded the Bermondsey Settlement, the only Methodist foundation among the 19th century settlements in the East End of London. Like the secular settlements such as Toynbee Hall, it aimed to bring into the neighbourhood middle-class activists who could provide social and educational facilities for the poor, rather than concentrating narrowly on evangelism like the Church's more traditional "Missions" located in poor areas of London.

Within the Church, Lidgett founded the modern Wesley Guild, a social organization aimed at young people but also offering activities to adults, which claimed over 150,000 members by 1900. He was President of the Wesleyan Methodist Conference (the ruling body of the denomination) in 1908–09. He was also an early supporter of the ecumenical movement and a key architect of British Methodist Union in 1932, and was the first President of the newly united church's conference. He remained in the active work of the ministry as chairman of the London South-West Methodist District until he was 94.

Lidgett was active in London politics for much of his career. He served as an alderman of the London County Council, and was leader of the Progressive Party on the council from 1918 to 1928. He was prominent on the LCC Education Committee. He was appointed a Member of the Order of the Companions of Honour in 1933.

== Family ==
Lidgett married Emmeline Davies in 1884. They had a son (John Cuthbert Lidgett, b.1885, killed in action 1918) and a daughter (Lettice Mary Lidgett, b.1887, m. Gerald H. Davy 1911, d.1980). Emmeline died in 1934.

== Published works ==
- The Spiritual Principle of the Atonement (the 1897 Fernley lecture)
- The Fatherhood of God (1902)
- The Christian Religion, its Meaning and Proof (1907)
- God in Christ Jesus (1915)
- Sonship and Salvation (1921)
- The Victorian Transformation of Theology (the 1934 Maurice lectures)
- My Guided Life (1936)
- The Idea of God and Social Ideals (1938)

== See also ==
- List of Vice-Chancellors of the University of London
- List of British university chancellors and vice-chancellors

== Bibliography ==
- Turberfield, A. F. (2002). John Scott Lidgett: Archbishop of British Methodism?. Peterborough: Epworth Press. ISBN 978-0-7162-0571-5.

Party political offices
Preceded by John Benn	Leader of the Progressive Party; 1918–1928	Succeeded by William Cowlishaw Johnson as leader of the Liberal Party on London County Council
Academic offices
Preceded by Sir Gregory Foster	Vice-Chancellor of the University of London; 1930-1932	Succeeded by John Leigh Smeathman Hatton
