= Whitechapel (London County Council constituency) =

London County Council constituency

- Former constituency for the London County Council

Former constituency
- Created: 1889
- Abolished: 1919
- Member(s): 2
- Replaced by: Whitechapel and St George's

Whitechapel was a constituency used for elections to the London County Council between 1889 and 1919. The seat shared boundaries with the UK Parliament constituency of the same name.

== Councillors ==
Year	Name	Party	Name	Party
1889	Stuart Samuel	Progressive	Charles Tarling	Progressive
1892	Thomas Catmur	Progressive	Charles Tarling	Progressive
1895	Thomas Catmur	Progressive	Morris Abrahams	Moderate
1897	Harry Levy-Lawson	Progressive	Morris Abrahams	Moderate
1898	Harry Levy-Lawson	Progressive	William Cowlishaw Johnson	Progressive
1904	Henry Herman Gordon	Independent	William Cowlishaw Johnson	Progressive
1907	Henry Herman Gordon	Progressive	William Cowlishaw Johnson	Progressive

== Election results ==
1889 London County Council election: Whitechapel
Party	Candidate	Votes	%	±%
Progressive	Stuart Samuel	1,523		
Progressive	Thomas Catmur	1,477		
Moderate	Morris Abrahams	1,205		
Independent	John Harris	854		
Progressive	Thomas Catmur	845		
Moderate	Henry Wren Henderson	512		
Progressive win (new seat)				
Progressive win (new seat)				

1892 London County Council election: Whitechapel
Party	Candidate	Votes	%	±%
Progressive	Charles Tarling	1,672		
Progressive	Thomas Catmur	1,666		
Moderate	John Hawkins	1,433		
Moderate	Elim Henry d'Avigdor	1,281		
Progressive hold		Swing		
Progressive hold		Swing		

1895 London County Council election: Whitechapel
Party	Candidate	Votes	%	±%
Moderate	Morris Abrahams	1,375		
Progressive	Thomas Catmur	1,165		
Moderate	Ernest Louis Meinertzhagen	1,124		
Progressive	William Cowlishaw Johnson	1,036		
Progressive	R. Ambrose	708		
Progressive	Charles Tarling	692		
Moderate gain from Progressive		Swing		
Progressive hold		Swing		

1898 London County Council election: Whitechapel
Party	Candidate	Votes	%	±%
Progressive	Harry Levy-Lawson	1,917		
Progressive	William Cowlishaw Johnson	1,768		
Moderate	L. Campbell-Johnson	1,322		
Progressive gain from Moderate		Swing		
Progressive hold		Swing		

1901 London County Council election: Whitechapel
Party	Candidate	Votes	%	±%
Progressive	Harry Levy-Lawson	1,785	32.9	+2.6
Progressive	William Cowlishaw Johnson	1,701	31.3	+3.4
Conservative	Donald Alexander Munro	1,053	19.4	−1.2
Conservative	Henry Wren Henderson	892	16.4	4.5
Progressive hold		Swing		
Progressive hold		Swing		

1904 London County Council election: Whitechapel
Party	Candidate	Votes	%	±%
Independent	Henry Herman Gordon	1,616		
Progressive	William Cowlishaw Johnson	1,326		
Progressive	George Lewis Bruce	1,163		
Conservative	E. C. Carter	910		
Conservative	G. B. B. Hobart	710		
Majority				
Progressive hold		Swing		
Independent gain from Progressive		Swing		

1907 London County Council election: Whitechapel
Party	Candidate	Votes	%	±%
Progressive	William Cowlishaw Johnson	1,756		
Independent	Henry Herman Gordon	1,627		
Municipal Reform	E. Hodsoll	1,211		
Municipal Reform	C. Wertheimer	980		
Independent Progressive	Elkin	772		
Majority				
Progressive hold		Swing		
Independent hold		Swing		

1910 London County Council election: Whitechapel
Party	Candidate	Votes	%	±%
Progressive	William Cowlishaw Johnson	1,954		
Progressive	Henry Herman Gordon	1,950		
Municipal Reform	W. Dully	825		
Municipal Reform	John Benjamin Lindenbaum	813		
Majority				
Progressive hold		Swing		
Progressive gain from Independent		Swing		

1913 London County Council election: Whitechapel
Party	Candidate	Votes	%	±%
Progressive	Henry Herman Gordon	1,746		
Progressive	William Cowlishaw Johnson	1,792		
Municipal Reform	E. G. Parry	1,008		
Municipal Reform	A. Ludski	916		
Majority		738		
Progressive hold		Swing		
Progressive hold		Swing		
