= Whitechapel and St George's (London County Council constituency) =

London County Council constituency

- Former constituency for the London County Council

Former constituency
- Created: 1919
- Abolished: 1949
- Member(s): 2
- Created from: St George and Whitechapel
- Replaced by: Stepney

Whitechapel and St George's was a constituency used for elections to the London County Council between 1919 and 1949. The seat shared boundaries with the UK Parliament constituency of the same name.

== Councillors ==
Year	Name	Party	Name	Party
1919	Henry Herman Gordon	Progressive	William Cowlishaw Johnson	Progressive
1922	Christopher John Kelly	Labour	William Cowlishaw Johnson	Progressive
1925	Christopher John Kelly	Labour	Morry Davis	Labour
1928	Jack Sullivan	Labour	Morry Davis	Labour
1931	Jack Oldfield	Labour	Morry Davis	Labour
1934	Jack Oldfield	Labour	Christopher John Kelly	Labour
1937	Jack Oldfield	Labour	Morry Davis	Labour
1945	Jack Oldfield	Labour	Richard Clements	Labour

== Election results ==
1919 London County Council election: Whitechapel and St George's
Party	Candidate	Votes	%	±%
Progressive	Henry Herman Gordon	Unopposed	n/a	n/a
Progressive	William Cowlishaw Johnson	Unopposed	n/a	n/a
Progressive hold		Swing		
Progressive hold		Swing		

1922 London County Council election: Whitechapel and St George's
Party	Candidate	Votes	%	±%
Labour	Christopher John Kelly	3,244	19.0	n/a
Progressive	William Cowlishaw Johnson	3,085	18.1	
Labour	Morry Davis	2,998	17.5	n/a
Progressive	J. J. Reidy	2,972	17.4	
Municipal Reform	Woolf Joel	2,557	15.0	n/a
Municipal Reform	Claude Herbert Grundy	2,227	13.0	n/a
Majority		87	0.6	
Labour gain from Progressive		Swing		
Progressive hold		Swing		

1925 London County Council election: Whitechapel and St George's
Party	Candidate	Votes	%	±%
Labour	Christopher John Kelly	4,231		
Labour	Morry Davis	4,187		
Progressive	William Cowlishaw Johnson	2,232		
Progressive	Ida Samuel	1,852		
Municipal Reform	E. E. Sturgess	623		
Municipal Reform	A. Ludlow	604		
Majority				
Labour gain from Progressive		Swing		
Labour hold		Swing		

1928 London County Council election: Whitechapel and St George's
Party	Candidate	Votes	%	±%
Labour	Morry Davis	5,327		
Labour	Jack Sullivan	5,324		
Municipal Reform	E. E. Sturgess	1,407		
Municipal Reform	Lindsay Richard Venn	1,387		
Liberal	Frank Milton	1,130		
Liberal	D. Braidman	1,057		
Independent	K. J. Gerber	219		
Majority				
Labour hold		Swing		
Labour hold		Swing		

1931 London County Council election: Whitechapel and St George's
Party	Candidate	Votes	%	±%
Labour	Morry Davis	3,566		
Labour	Jack Oldfield	3,503		
Independent	M. Moses	1,352		
Independent	W. J. Pincombe	1,169		
Communist	Sid Elias	380		
Communist	Ernie Pountney	374		
Majority				
Labour hold		Swing		
Labour hold		Swing		

1934 London County Council election: Whitechapel and St George's
Party	Candidate	Votes	%	±%
Labour	Morry Davis	5,788		
Labour	Jack Oldfield	5,770		
Liberal	L. Buxton	1,938		
Liberal	W. Jones	1,796		
Communist	J. Lynch	418		
Communist	John Gollan	389		
Majority				
Labour hold		Swing		
Labour hold		Swing		

1937 London County Council election: Whitechapel and St George's
Party	Candidate	Votes	%	±%
Labour	Jack Oldfield	8,830		
Labour	Morry Davis	8,720		
Municipal Reform	R. Jones	1,610		
Municipal Reform	M. Rose	1,478		
Majority				
Labour hold		Swing		
Labour hold		Swing		

1946 London County Council election: Whitechapel and St George's
Party	Candidate	Votes	%	±%
Labour	Jack Oldfield	3,470		
Labour	Richard Clements	3,427		
Communist	Michael Shapiro	2,116		
Communist	Bill Carver	2,060		
Majority				
Labour hold		Swing		
Labour hold		Swing		
