= William Cowlishaw Johnson =

British politician

William Cowlishaw Johnson (1862 – 8 November 1943) was a British politician.

Born in Kingsland, Johnson was elected at the 1898 London County Council election in Whitechapel for the Progressive Party. He also served on Stepney Metropolitan Borough Council, and as a magistrate chaired the Tower Hamlets Division. He chaired the committee of the People's Palace, and also served on the committees of Toynbee Hall and the Whitechapel Art Gallery.

At the 1925 London County Council election, Johnson lost his County Council seat, by then Whitechapel and St George's, but was instead appointed as an alderman. The Progressive Party was dissolved in 1926, and Johnson became recognised as the leader of the Liberal Party on the council. However, the stress of the position led to poor health, and he was soon replaced by Percy Harris. He left the council in 1931, retiring to Watford, where he died in 1943.
