= Parliamentary constituencies in London =

The region of Greater London, including the City of London, is divided into 75 parliamentary constituencies all of which are sub-classified as borough constituencies, affecting the type of electoral officer and level of expenses permitted. Since the general election of July 2024, 59 are represented by Labour MPs, 8 by Conservative MPs, 6 by Liberal Democrat MPs, 1 by Reform UK MPs, and 1 by an independent-turned-Your Party MP.

== Current constituencies ==
Parliamentary constituencies in London with 2024 results
Constituency	Electorate	Majority (Note: The majority is the number of votes the winning candidate receives more than their nearest rival.)	Member of Parliament	Nearest opposition	Map
Barking	79,825	11,054	Nesil Caliskan (Labour)	Clive Peacock (Reform UK)	
Battersea	72,767	12,039	Marsha de Cordova (Labour)	Tom Pridham (Conservative)	
Beckenham and Penge	77,194	12,905	Liam Conlon (Labour)	Hannah Gray (Conservative)	
Bermondsey and Old Southwark	69,473	7,787	Neil Coyle (Labour)	Rachel Bentley (Liberal Democrats)	
Bethnal Green and Stepney	81,922	1,689	Rushanara Ali (Labour)	Ajmal Masroor (independent)	
Bexleyheath and Crayford	70,297	2,114	Daniel Francis (Labour)	Mark Brooks (Conservative)	
Brent East	77,257	13,047	Dawn Butler (Labour)	Jamila Robertson (Conservative)	
Brent West	79,937	3,793	Barry Gardiner (Labour)	Sushil Rapatwar (Conservative)	
Brentford and Isleworth	79,283	9,824	Ruth Cadbury (Labour)	Laura Blumenthal (Conservative)	
Bromley and Biggin Hill	70,713	302	Peter Fortune (Conservative)	Oana Olaru-Holmes (Labour)	
Carshalton and Wallington	74,362	7,905	Bobby Dean (Liberal Democrats)	Elliot Colburn (Conservative)	
Chelsea and Fulham	78,468	152	Ben Coleman (Labour)	Greg Hands (Conservative)	
Chingford and Woodford Green	75,178	4,758	Sir Iain Duncan Smith (Conservative)	Shama Tatler (Labour)	
Chipping Barnet	78,038	2,914	Dan Tomlinson (Labour)	Theresa Villiers (Conservative)	
Cities of London and Westminster	73,369	2,708	Rachel Blake (Labour)	Tim Barnes (Conservative)	
Clapham and Brixton Hill	75,460	18,005	Bell Ribeiro-Addy (Labour)	Ben Curtis (Liberal Democrats)	
Croydon East	76,660	6,825	Natasha Irons (Labour)	Jason Cummings (Conservative)	
Croydon South	74,968	2,313	Chris Philp (Conservative)	Ben Taylor (Labour)	
Croydon West	77,942	14,226	Sarah Jones (Labour)	Simon Fox (Conservative)	
Dagenham and Rainham	76,478	7,173	Margaret Mullane (Labour)	Kevin Godfrey (Reform UK)	
Dulwich and West Norwood	74,265	18,789	Helen Hayes (Labour)	Pete Elliott (Green)	
Ealing Central and Acton	78,436	13,995	Rupa Huq (Labour)	James Windsor-Clive (Conservative)	
Ealing North	74,820	12,489	James Murray (Labour)	Maria Khan (Conservative)	
Ealing Southall	78,669	15,793	Deirdre Costigan (Labour)	Georgie Callé (Conservative)	
East Ham	79,086	12,863	Stephen Timms (Labour)	Tahir Mirza (independent)	
Edmonton and Winchmore Hill	75,792	12,632	Kate Osamor (Labour)	Zoe Huggins (Conservative)	
Eltham and Chislehurst	74,224	8,429	Clive Efford (Labour)	Charlie Davis (Conservative)	
Enfield North	78,770	12,736	Feryal Clark (Labour)	Chris Day (Conservative)	
Erith and Thamesmead	78,886	16,302	Abena Oppong-Asare (Labour)	Michael Pastor (Reform UK)	
Feltham and Heston	76,983	7,944	Seema Malhotra (Labour)	Reva Gudi (Conservative)	
Finchley and Golders Green	77,500	4,581	Sarah Sackman (Labour)	Alex Deane (Conservative)	
Greenwich and Woolwich	73,573	18,366	Matthew Pennycook (Labour)	Stacy Smith (Green)	
Hackney North and Stoke Newington	77,797	15,080	Diane Abbott (Labour)	Antoinette Fernandez (Green)	
Hackney South and Shoreditch	78,262	14,737	Meg Hillier (Labour)	Laura-Louise Fairley (Green)	
Hammersmith and Chiswick	75,860	15,290	Andy Slaughter (Labour)	Andrew Dinsmore (Conservative)	
Hampstead and Highgate	80,029	14,970	Tulip Siddiq (Labour)	Don Williams (Conservative)	
Harrow East	76,386	11,680	Bob Blackman (Conservative)	Primesh Patel (Labour)	
Harrow West	79,902	6,642	Gareth Thomas (Labour)	Abbas Merali (Conservative)	
Hayes and Harlington	74,404	12,031	John McDonnell (Labour)	Dylan Thomas (Conservative)	
Hendon	74,865	15	David Pinto-Duschinsky (Labour)	Ameet Jogia (Conservative)	
Holborn and St Pancras	71,300	3,364	Sagal Abdi-Wali (Labour)	Zack Polanski (Green)	
Hornchurch and Upminster	75,438	1,943	Julia Lopez (Conservative)	Nicholas Palmer (Reform UK)	
Hornsey and Friern Barnet	69,885	21,475	Catherine West (Labour)	Fabio Vollono (Green)	
Ilford North	77,835	528	Wes Streeting (Labour)	Leanne Mohamad (independent)	
Ilford South	80,993	6,896	Jas Athwal (Labour)	Noor Begum (independent)	
Islington North	72,582	7,247	Jeremy Corbyn (Your Party; re-elected as independent)	Praful Nargund (Labour)	
Islington South and Finsbury	74,122	15,455	Emily Thornberry (Labour)	Carne Ross (Green)	
Kensington and Bayswater	77,306	2,903	Joe Powell (Labour)	Felicity Buchan (Conservative)	
Kingston and Surbiton	77,340	17,235	Sir Ed Davey (Liberal Democrats)	Helen Edward (Conservative)	
Lewisham East	73,376	18,073	Janet Daby (Labour)	Mike Herron (Green)	
Lewisham North	74,204	15,782	Vicky Foxcroft (Labour)	Adam Pugh (Green)	
Lewisham West and East Dulwich	70,099	18,397	Ellie Reeves (Labour)	Callum Fowler (Green)	
Leyton and Wanstead	73,366	13,964	Calvin Bailey (Labour)	Charlotte Lafferty (Green)	
Mitcham and Morden	77,272	18,761	Siobhain McDonagh (Labour)	Ellie Cox (Conservative)	
Old Bexley and Sidcup	72,290	3,548	Louie French (Conservative)	Edward Jones (Labour)	
Orpington	71,203	5,118	Gareth Bacon (Conservative)	Ju Owens (Labour)	
Peckham	72,123	15,228	Miatta Fahnbulleh (Labour)	Claire Sheppard (Green)	
Poplar and Limehouse	84,116	12,560	Apsana Begum (Labour)	Nathalie Bienfait (Green)	
Putney	72,614	12,488	Fleur Anderson (Labour)	Lee Roberts (Conservative)	
Queen's Park and Maida Vale	75,558	14,913	Georgia Gould (Labour)	Vivien Lichtenstein (Green)	
Richmond Park	68,103	17,155	Sarah Olney (Liberal Democrats)	Sara Gezdari (Conservative)	
Romford	72,978	1,463	Andrew Rosindell (Reform UK (Note: Rosindell was elected as a Conservative but defected to Reform UK in January 2026))	Andrew Achilleos (Labour)	
Ruislip, Northwood and Pinner	71,683	7,581	David Simmonds (Conservative)	Tony Gill (Labour)	
Southgate and Wood Green	77,542	15,300	Bambos Charalambous (Labour)	Eric Sukumaran (Conservative)	
Stratford and Bow	80,560	11,634	Uma Kumaran (Labour)	Joe Hudson-Small (Green)	
Streatham and Croydon North	76,966	15,603	Steve Reed (Labour)	Scott Ainslie (Green)	
Sutton and Cheam	72,303	3,801	Luke Taylor (Liberal Democrats)	Tom Drummond (Conservative)	
Tooting	76,082	19,487	Rosena Allin-Khan (Labour)	Ethan Brooks (Conservative)	
Tottenham	75,906	15,434	David Lammy (Labour)	David Craig (Green)	
Twickenham	74,980	21,457	Munira Wilson (Liberal Democrats)	Jonathan Hulley (Conservative)	
Uxbridge and South Ruislip	74,746	587	Danny Beales (Labour)	Steve Tuckwell (Conservative)	
Vauxhall and Camberwell Green	69,658	15,112	Florence Eshalomi (Labour)	Catherine Dawkins (Green)	
Walthamstow	76,338	17,996	Stella Creasy (Labour)	Rosalinda Rowlands (Green)	
West Ham and Beckton	78,790	9,254	James Asser (Labour)	Sophia Naqvi (Newham Independents)	
Wimbledon	76,334	12,610	Paul Kohler (Liberal Democrats)	Danielle Dunfield-Prayer (Conservative)	

== Boundary changes ==
Following the abandonment of the Sixth Periodic Review (the 2018 review), the Boundary Commission for England formally launched the 2023 Review on 5 January 2021. The Commission calculated that the number of seats to be allocated to the London region would increase by 2 from 73 to 75. Initial proposals were published on 8 June 2021 and, following two periods of public consultation, revised proposals were published on 8 November 2022. The final proposals were published on 28 June 2023.

Under the proposals, an additional constituency named Stratford and Bow was created, covering parts of the boroughs of Newham and Tower Hamlets and straddling the River Lea and, in the south of the city, there would be a new constituency named Streatham and Croydon North, covering parts of the boroughs of Croydon and Lambeth. Elsewhere, changes to boundaries resulted in a number of name changes. Only Walthamstow, Islington North and Tooting remained entirely unchanged, with a further seven unchanged except to realign constituency boundaries with local government ward boundaries.

=== Abolished seats ===
- Beckenham
- Bethnal Green and Bow
- Brent Central
- Brent North
- Bromley and Chislehurst
- Camberwell and Peckham
- Croydon Central
- Croydon North
- Edmonton
- Eltham
- Enfield Southgate
- Hammersmith
- Hampstead and Kilburn
- Hornsey and Wood Green
- Kensington
- Lewisham Deptford
- Lewisham West and Penge
- Streatham
- Vauxhall
- West Ham
- Westminster North

=== New seats ===
- Beckenham and Penge
- Bethnal Green and Stepney
- Brent East
- Brent West
- Bromley and Biggin Hill
- Clapham and Brixton Hill
- Croydon East
- Croydon West
- Edmonton and Winchmore Hill
- Hammersmith and Chiswick
- Hampstead and Highgate
- Hornsey and Friern Barnet
- Kensington and Bayswater
- Peckham
- Queen's Park and Maida Vale
- Stratford and Bow
- Streatham and Croydon North
- Vauxhall and Camberwell Green
- West Ham and Beckton

== History ==
=== Inner London ===
==== Prior to 1832 ====
Prior to 1832, the metropolitan area of London was represented by the parliamentary boroughs of City of London (four MPs), Westminster and Southwark (two MPs each). The remainder of the metropolitan area was covered by the historical counties of Middlesex and Surrey.

==== 1832 to 1868 ====
The Reform Act 1832 gave representation in the London metropolitan area to seven parliamentary boroughs, known as the metropolitan boroughs, with the formation of four additional boroughs, each electing two MPs. In addition, Greenwich was formed as a separate borough from the counties of Kent and Surrey.

- City of London
- Finsbury
- Greenwich
- Lambeth
- Marylebone
- Southwark
- Tower Hamlets
- Westminster

==== 1868 to 1885 ====
The Reform Act 1867 expanded the metropolitan area to include the new borough of Chelsea, and Tower Hamlets was divided into the two boroughs of Hackney and Tower Hamlets.

- Chelsea
- City of London
- Finsbury
- Greenwich
- Hackney
- Lambeth
- Marylebone
- Southwark
- Tower Hamlets
- Westminster

==== 1885 to 1918 ====
The Redistribution of Seats Act 1885 extended the area of parliamentary boroughs to the Metropolitan Board of Works area. With the exception of the City of London, whose representation was reduced from four to two MPs, each borough, or division thereof, was represented by one MP. This act increased the number of MPs representing London from 22 to 59.

The County of London was created in 1889 in succession to the Metropolitan Board of Works. In 1900, the county was divided into 28 boroughs (plus the City of London) and the outer boundary was adjusted. However, the old constituency boundaries remained in place until 1918.

For representation by party, see sections 1885 to 1900 and 1900 to 1918.

- Battersea
- Bermondsey
- Bethnal Green North East
- Bethnal Green South West
- Bow and Bromley
- Brixton
- Camberwell North
- Chelsea
- City of London
- Clapham
- Deptford
- Dulwich
- Finsbury Central
- Finsbury East
- Fulham
- Greenwich
- Hackney Central
- Hackney North
- Hackney South
- Haggerston
- Hammersmith
- Hampstead
- Holborn
- Hoxton
- Islington East
- Islington North
- Islington South
- Islington West
- Kennington
- Kensington North
- Kensington South
- Lambeth North
- Lewisham
- Limehouse
- Marylebone East
- Marylebone West
- Mile End
- Newington West
- Norwood
- Paddington North
- Paddington South
- Peckham
- Poplar
- Rotherhithe
- St George
- St George, Hanover Square
- St Pancras East
- St Pancras North
- St Pancras South
- St Pancras West
- Southwark West
- Stepney
- Strand
- Walworth
- Wandsworth
- Westminster
- Whitechapel
- Woolwich

==== 1918 to 1950 ====
Under the Representation of the People Act 1918 the parliamentary boroughs corresponded to the metropolitan boroughs created in 1900, with each borough, or division thereof, being represented by one MP. The City of London continued to be represented by two MPs despite the very small size of its electorate. The number of MPs was increased from 59 to 62.

For representation by party, see sections 1918 to 1931 and 1931 to 1950.

- Balham and Tooting
- Battersea North
- Battersea South
- Bermondsey West
- Bethnal Green North East
- Bethnal Green South West
- Bow and Bromley
- Brixton
- Camberwell North
- Camberwell North West
- Chelsea
- City of London
- Clapham
- Deptford
- Dulwich
- Finsbury
- Fulham East
- Fulham West
- Greenwich
- Hackney Central
- Hackney North
- Hackney South
- Hammersmith North
- Hammersmith South
- Hampstead
- Holborn
- Islington East
- Islington North
- Islington South
- Islington West
- Kennington
- Kensington North
- Kensington South
- Lambeth North
- Lewisham East
- Lewisham West
- Limehouse
- Mile End
- Norwood
- Paddington North
- Paddington South
- Peckham
- Putney
- Rotherhithe
- St Marylebone
- St Pancras North
- St Pancras South East
- St Pancras South West
- Shoreditch
- South Poplar
- Southwark Central
- Southwark North
- Southwark South East
- Stoke Newington
- Streatham
- Wandsworth Central
- Westminster Abbey
- Westminster St George's
- Whitechapel and St George's
- Woolwich East
- Woolwich West

==== 1950 to 1974 ====
Under the Representation of the People Act 1948, which came into effect for the 1950 general election, the county of London was divided into 43 borough constituencies.

Under the First Periodic Review of Westminster constituencies, effective from the 1955 general election, there were limited changes in London, with a reduction of one constituency across the boroughs of Fulham and Hammersmith.

For representation by party, see section 1950 to 1974.

- Barons Court (from 1955)
- Battersea North
- Battersea South
- Bermondsey
- Bethnal Green
- Brixton
- Chelsea
- Cities of London and Westminster
- Clapham
- Deptford
- Dulwich
- Fulham (from 1955)
- Fulham East (1950–1955)
- Fulham West (1950–1955)
- Greenwich
- Hackney Central (1955 onwards)
- Hackney South (1950–1955)
- Hammersmith North
- Hammersmith South (1950–1955)
- Hampstead
- Holborn and St Pancras South
- Islington East
- Islington North
- Islington South West
- Kensington North
- Kensington South
- Lewisham North
- Lewisham South
- Lewisham West
- Norwood
- Paddington North
- Paddington South
- Peckham
- Poplar
- Putney
- St Marylebone
- St Pancras North
- Shoreditch and Finsbury
- Southwark
- Stepney
- Stoke Newington and Hackney North
- Streatham
- Vauxhall
- Wandsworth Central
- Woolwich East
- Woolwich West

=== Outer London ===
==== 1965 to 1974 ====
Despite Greater London being created in 1965, the old constituency boundaries remained in place until 1974, awaiting the implementation of the Second Periodic Review of Westminster constituencies. From 1965 to 1974, Outer London included the following constituencies or parts of constituencies.

Formerly in Essex:

- Barking
- Dagenham
- East Ham North
- East Ham South
- Epping (part)
- Hornchurch
- Ilford North
- Ilford South
- Leyton
- Romford
- Walthamstow East
- Walthamstow West
- Wanstead and Woodford
- West Ham North
- West Ham South

Formerly in Hertfordshire:

- Barnet (part)

Formerly in Kent:

- Beckenham
- Bexley
- Bromley
- Chislehurst
- Erith and Crayford
- Orpington

Formerly in Middlesex:

- Acton
- Brentford and Chiswick
- Ealing North
- Ealing South
- Edmonton
- Enfield East
- Enfield West (part)
- Feltham
- Finchley
- Harrow Central
- Harrow East
- Harrow West
- Hayes and Harlington
- Hendon North
- Hendon South
- Heston and Isleworth
- Hornsey
- Ruislip-Northwood
- Southall
- Southgate
- Tottenham
- Twickenham
- Uxbridge
- Wembley North
- Wembley South
- Willesden East
- Willesden West
- Wood Green

Formerly in Surrey:

- Carshalton (part)
- Croydon North East
- Croydon North West
- Croydon South
- East Surrey (part)
- Kingston-upon-Thames
- Merton and Morden
- Mitcham
- Richmond
- Surbiton
- Sutton and Cheam
- Wimbledon

=== Greater London ===
==== 1974 to 1983 ====
When Greater London was created in 1965 the existing constituencies crossed county boundaries. The constituency review reported in 1969, and was implemented for the February 1974 election. All 92 constituencies were contained within Greater London and each were within a single London borough, with the exception of the City of London and Westminster South. They were all borough constituencies. The constituencies were also used as electoral divisions for the Greater London Council from 1973 to 1986.

For representation by party, see sections North West, North East, South West and South East.

- Acton
- Barking
- Battersea North
- Battersea South
- Beckenham
- Bermondsey
- Bethnal Green and Bow
- Bexleyheath
- Brent East
- Brent North
- Brent South
- Brentford and Isleworth
- Carshalton
- Chelsea
- Chingford
- Chipping Barnet
- Chislehurst
- City of London and Westminster South
- Croydon Central
- Croydon North East
- Croydon North West
- Croydon South
- Dagenham
- Dulwich
- Ealing North
- Edmonton
- Enfield North
- Erith and Crayford
- Feltham and Heston
- Finchley
- Fulham
- Greenwich
- Hackney Central
- Hackney North and Stoke Newington
- Hackney South and Shoreditch
- Hammersmith North
- Hampstead
- Harrow Central
- Harrow East
- Harrow West
- Hayes and Harlington
- Hendon North
- Hendon South
- Holborn and St Pancras South
- Hornchurch
- Hornsey
- Ilford North
- Ilford South
- Islington Central
- Islington North
- Islington South and Finsbury
- Kensington
- Kingston upon Thames
- Lambeth Central
- Lewisham Deptford
- Lewisham East
- Lewisham West
- Leyton
- Mitcham and Morden
- Newham North East
- Newham North West
- Newham South
- Norwood
- Orpington
- Paddington
- Peckham
- Putney
- Ravensbourne
- Richmond upon Thames
- Romford
- Ruislip Northwood
- St Marylebone
- St Pancras North
- Sidcup
- Southall
- Southgate
- Stepney and Poplar
- Streatham
- Surbiton
- Sutton and Cheam
- Tooting
- Tottenham
- Twickenham
- Upminster
- Uxbridge
- Vauxhall
- Walthamstow
- Wanstead and Woodford
- Wimbledon
- Wood Green
- Woolwich East
- Woolwich West

==== 1983 to 1997 ====
The constituencies were redrawn for the 1983 election. All 84 constituencies were contained within Greater London and each were within a single London borough, with the exception of the City of London and Westminster South. They were all borough constituencies.

For representation by party, see sections North West, North East, South West and South East.

- Barking
- Battersea
- Beckenham
- Bethnal Green and Stepney
- Bexleyheath
- Bow and Poplar
- Brent East
- Brent North
- Brent South
- Brentford and Isleworth
- Carshalton and Wallington
- Chelsea
- Chingford
- Chipping Barnet
- Chislehurst
- City of London and Westminster South
- Croydon Central
- Croydon North East
- Croydon North West
- Croydon South
- Dagenham
- Dulwich
- Ealing Acton
- Ealing North
- Ealing Southall
- Edmonton
- Eltham
- Enfield North
- Enfield Southgate
- Erith and Crayford
- Feltham and Heston
- Finchley
- Fulham
- Greenwich
- Hackney North and Stoke Newington
- Hackney South and Shoreditch
- Hammersmith
- Hampstead and Highgate
- Harrow East
- Harrow West
- Hayes and Harlington
- Hendon North
- Hendon South
- Holborn and St Pancras
- Hornchurch
- Hornsey and Wood Green
- Ilford North
- Ilford South
- Islington North
- Islington South and Finsbury
- Kensington
- Kingston upon Thames
- Lewisham Deptford
- Lewisham East
- Lewisham West
- Leyton
- Mitcham and Morden
- Newham North East
- Newham North West
- Newham South
- Norwood
- Old Bexley and Sidcup
- Orpington
- Peckham
- Putney
- Ravensbourne
- Richmond and Barnes
- Romford
- Ruislip Northwood
- Southwark and Bermondsey
- Streatham
- Surbiton
- Sutton and Cheam
- Tooting
- Tottenham
- Twickenham
- Upminster
- Uxbridge
- Vauxhall
- Walthamstow
- Wanstead and Woodford
- Westminster North
- Wimbledon
- Woolwich

==== 1997 to 2010 ====
The constituencies were redrawn for the 1997 election. All 74 constituencies were contained within Greater London. Constituencies crossed borough boundaries between Bexley and Greenwich; Ealing, and Hammersmith and Fulham; Kensington and Chelsea, Westminster and the City of London; Kingston upon Thames and Richmond upon Thames; Lambeth and Southwark; Newham and Tower Hamlets; and Redbridge and Waltham Forest. They were all borough constituencies.

For representation by party, see sections North West, North East, South West and South East.

- Barking
- Battersea
- Beckenham
- Bethnal Green and Bow
- Bexleyheath and Crayford
- Brent East
- Brent North
- Brent South
- Brentford and Isleworth
- Bromley and Chislehurst
- Camberwell and Peckham
- Carshalton and Wallington
- Chingford and Woodford Green
- Chipping Barnet
- Cities of London and Westminster
- Croydon Central
- Croydon North
- Croydon South
- Dagenham
- Dulwich and West Norwood
- Ealing, Acton and Shepherd's Bush
- Ealing North
- Ealing, Southall
- East Ham
- Edmonton
- Eltham
- Enfield North
- Enfield, Southgate
- Erith and Thamesmead
- Feltham and Heston
- Finchley and Golders Green
- Greenwich and Woolwich
- Hackney North and Stoke Newington
- Hackney South and Shoreditch
- Hammersmith and Fulham
- Hampstead and Highgate
- Harrow East
- Harrow West
- Hayes and Harlington
- Hendon
- Holborn and St Pancras
- Hornchurch
- Hornsey and Wood Green
- Ilford North
- Ilford South
- Islington North
- Islington South and Finsbury
- Kensington and Chelsea
- Kingston and Surbiton
- Lewisham, Deptford
- Lewisham East
- Lewisham West
- Leyton and Wanstead
- Mitcham and Morden
- North Southwark and Bermondsey
- Old Bexley and Sidcup
- Orpington
- Poplar and Canning Town
- Putney
- Regent's Park and Kensington North
- Richmond Park
- Romford
- Ruislip-Northwood
- Streatham
- Sutton and Cheam
- Tooting
- Tottenham
- Twickenham
- Upminster
- Uxbridge
- Vauxhall
- Walthamstow
- West Ham
- Wimbledon

==== 2010 to 2024 ====
The constituencies were redrawn for the 2010 election. All 73 constituencies were contained within Greater London. Constituencies crossed borough boundaries between Barking and Dagenham, and Havering; Brent and Camden; Harrow and Hillingdon; Kensington and Chelsea, and Hammersmith and Fulham; Redbridge and Waltham Forest; Bexley and Greenwich; Bromley and Lewisham; Kingston upon Thames and Richmond upon Thames; Lambeth and Southwark; and Westminster and the City of London. They were all borough constituencies.

For representation by party, see sections North West, North East, South West and South East.

- Barking
- Battersea
- Beckenham
- Bermondsey and Old Southwark
- Bethnal Green and Bow
- Bexleyheath and Crayford
- Brent Central
- Brent North
- Brentford and Isleworth
- Bromley and Chislehurst
- Camberwell and Peckham
- Carshalton and Wallington
- Chelsea and Fulham
- Chingford and Woodford Green
- Chipping Barnet
- Cities of London and Westminster
- Croydon Central
- Croydon North
- Croydon South
- Dagenham and Rainham
- Dulwich and West Norwood
- Ealing Central and Acton
- Ealing North
- Ealing Southall
- East Ham
- Edmonton
- Eltham
- Enfield North
- Enfield Southgate
- Erith and Thamesmead
- Feltham and Heston
- Finchley and Golders Green
- Greenwich and Woolwich
- Hackney North and Stoke Newington
- Hackney South and Shoreditch
- Hammersmith
- Hampstead and Kilburn
- Harrow East
- Harrow West
- Hayes and Harlington
- Hendon
- Holborn and St Pancras
- Hornchurch and Upminster
- Hornsey and Wood Green
- Ilford North
- Ilford South
- Islington North
- Islington South and Finsbury
- Kensington
- Kingston and Surbiton
- Lewisham Deptford
- Lewisham East
- Lewisham West and Penge
- Leyton and Wanstead
- Mitcham and Morden
- Old Bexley and Sidcup
- Orpington
- Poplar and Limehouse
- Putney
- Richmond Park
- Romford
- Ruislip Northwood and Pinner
- Streatham
- Sutton and Cheam
- Tooting
- Tottenham
- Twickenham
- Uxbridge and South Ruislip
- Vauxhall
- Walthamstow
- West Ham
- Westminster North
- Wimbledon

== Historical representation by party ==
A cell marked → (with a different colour background to the preceding cell) indicates that the previous MP continued to sit under a new party name.

=== Inner London ===
==== 1885 to 1900 ====
Conservative Liberal Liberal-Labour Liberal Unionist

Constituency	1885	1886	87	88	89	90	91	92	1892	92	93	94	95	1895	95	96	97	98	99	00
Battersea	Morgan								Burns											
Bermondsey	Rogers	Lafone							Barrow					Lafone						
Bethnal Green NE	Howell													Bhownagree						
Bethnal Green SW	Pickersgill																			
Bow and Bromley	Robson	Colomb							Macdonald					Holland					Guthrie	
Brixton	Baggallay		Osborne													Hubbard				Mowbray
Camberwell North	Strong	Kelly							Bayley					Dalbiac						
Chelsea	Dilke	Whitmore																		
Clapham	Moulton	Gilliat							Thornton											
Deptford	Evelyn			Darling													Morton			
Dulwich	Howard		Maple																	
Finsbury Central	Spensley	Penton							Naoroji					Massey-Mainwaring						
Finsbury East	Bigwood	Rowlands												Richards						
Fulham	Fisher																			
Greenwich	Boord													Cecil						
Hackney Central	Hunter								Scoble											
Hackney North	Pelly							Bousfield												
Hackney South	Russell											Moulton		Robertson						
Haggerston	Cremer													Lowles						
Hammersmith	Goldsworthy																			
Hampstead	Holland			Hoare																
Holborn	Duncan			Bruce						Hall										Remnant
Hoxton	Stuart																			
Islington East	Ince	Lambert							Cohen											
Islington North	Bartley																			
Islington South	Spicer	Rollit																		
Islington West	Chamberlain	→							Lough											
Kennington	Gent-Davis				Beaufoy									Cook						
Kensington North	Lethbridge								Frye					Sharpe						
Kensington South	Borthwick														Percy					
Lambeth North	Fraser								Coldwells					Stanley						
Lewisham	Legge						Penn													
Limehouse	Norris								Wallace					Samuel						
City of London	Hubbard		Baring				H. Gibbs		A. Gibbs											
City of London	Fowler						Hanson													
Marylebone East	Beresford				Boulnois															
Marylebone West	Hunt													Farquhar				Scott		
Mile End	Charrington																			
Newington West	Cooke								Norton											
Norwood	Bristowe								Tritton											
Paddington North	Cohen		Aird																	
Paddington South	Churchill												Fardell							
Peckham	Baumann								Banbury											
Poplar	Green	Buxton																		
Constituency	1885	1886	87	88	89	90	91	92	1892	92	93	94	95	1895	95	96	97	98	99	00
Rotherhithe	Hamilton								Macdona											
St George, Hanover Sq	Percy		Goschen								→									
St George, Twr Hamlts	Ritchie								Benn					Marks						
St Pancras East	Gibb	Webster																	Wrightson	
St Pancras North	Bolton	Cochrane-Baillie				Bolton					→			Moon						
St Pancras South	Goldsmid	→														Jessel				
St Pancras West	Levy-Lawson								Graham											
Southwark West	Cohen			Causton																
Stepney	Durant	Isaacson																Steadman		
Strand	W. H. Smith						W. F. Smith													
Walworth	Isaacs								Saunders				Bailey							
Wandsworth	Kimber																			
Westminster	Burdett-Coutts																			
Whitechapel	Montagu																			
Woolwich	Hughes																			

==== 1900 to 1918 ====
Conservative Labour Liberal Liberal-Labour Liberal Unionist National Party

Constituency	1900	01	02	03	04	05	1906	06	07	08	09	Jan 1910	Dec 1910	11	12	13	14	15	16	17	18
Battersea	Burns																				
Bermondsey	Cust						Cooper				Dumphreys	Glanville									
Bethnal Green NE	Bhownaggree						Cornwall														
Bethnal Green SW	Ridley						Pickersgill							Masterman			M. Wilson				
Bow and Bromley	Guthrie						Brooke					Du Cros	Lansbury		Blair						
Brixton	Mowbray						Seaverns					Dalziel									
Camberwell North	Macnamara																				
Chelsea	Whitmore						Horniman					S. Hoare									
Clapham	Thornton											Faber									Greer
Deptford	Morton						Bowerman														
Dulwich	Maple			Harris				Bonar Law					Hall								
Finsbury Central	Massey-Mainwaring						Steadman					Archer-Shee									
Finsbury East	Richards					Baker															Cotton
Fulham	Fisher						Davies					Fisher									
Greenwich	H. Cecil						Jackson					I. H. Benn									
Hackney Central	Allhusen						Spicer														
Hackney North	Bousfield						Hart-Davies					Greene									
Hackney South	Robertson						Bottomley								Morison						
Haggerston	Cremer									Guinness		Chancellor									
Hammersmith	Bull																				
Hampstead	E. B. Hoare		Milvain			Fletcher															
Holborn	Remnant																				
Hoxton	Hay											Addison									
Islington East	Cohen						Radford													Smallwood	
Islington North	Bartley						Waterlow						Touche								
Islington South	Rollit						Wiles														
Constituency	1900	01	02	03	04	05	1906	06	07	08	09	Jan 1910	Dec 1910	11	12	13	14	15	16	17	18
Islington West	Lough																				
Kennington	Cook						S. Collins														
Kensington North	Sharpe						Stanger					Burgoyne								→	
Kensington South	Percy											Hamilton									
Lambeth North	Horner						Myer					Gastrell									
Lewisham	Penn			Coates																	
Limehouse	H. Samuel						Pearce														
City of London	Gibbs							Balfour													
City of London	Dimsdale						E. Clarke	Banbury													
Marylebone East	Boulnois						R. Cecil					Boyton									
Marylebone West	Scott																				
Mile End	Charrington					Levy-Lawson	B. Straus					Levy-Lawson			→				Brookes		
Newington West	Norton																		Gilbert		
Norwood	Tritton						Bowles					H. Samuel									
Paddington North	Aird						Money					Strauss									
Paddington South	Fardell											H. P. Harris									
Peckham	Banbury						C. G. Clarke			Gooch			Richardson								
Poplar	Buxton																Yeo				
Rotherhithe	Macdona						Carr-Gomm														
St George, Hanover Sq	Legge							Lyttelton							→	Henderson			Reid		Moore
St George, Twr Hamlts	Dewar						W. W. Benn														
St Pancras East	Wrightson						Lea					Martin									→
St Pancras North	Moon						Dickinson														
St Pancras South	Jessel						P. W. Wilson					Jessel			→						
St Pancras West	Graham						W. Collins						Cassel						Barnett		
Southwark West	Causton											Dunn	Strauss								
Constituency	1900	01	02	03	04	05	1906	06	07	08	09	Jan 1910	Dec 1910	11	12	13	14	15	16	17	18
Stepney	Evans-Gordon								L. Harris				Glyn-Jones								
Strand	Smith											Long									
Walworth	Bailey						O'Donnell					Dawes									
Wandsworth	Kimber															S. Samuel					
Westminster	Burdett-Coutts																				
Whitechapel	S. M. Samuel																		Kiley		
Woolwich	Hughes		Beresford	Crooks								Adam	Crooks								

==== 1918 to 1931 ====
Coalition Liberal (1918–22) / National Liberal (1922–23) Communist Conservative Empire Free Trade Crusade Independent Independent Conservative Labour Liberal National Labour

Constituency	1918	19	20	21	22	1922	23	1923	24	1924	25	26	27	27	29	1929	30	31
Balham and Tooting	Denison-Pender							Butt										
Chelsea	Hoare																	
Clapham	du Cros				Leigh													
Dulwich	Hall																	
Fulham East	Norris					Vaughan-Morgan												
Hampstead	Balfour																	
Holborn	Remnant														Bevan			
Lewisham East	Pownall																	
Lewisham West	Coates			Dawson														
Kensington South	Davison																	
Hackney North	Greene							Harris		Hudson								
Brixton	Dalziel							Laverack		Dalziel				Colman				
Fulham West	Cobb															Spero	Cobb	
Hammersmith South	Bull															Chater		
Islington North	Moore							Cowan								Young		
Kensington North	Burgoyne					Gates										West		
Battersea South	Curzon														Bennett			
Greenwich	Benn					Hume		Palmer		Hume						Palmer		
Islington East	Raper					Hudson		Carr		Tasker						Bentham		Manning
Camberwell North-West	McNamara							→		Campbell						Morgan		
Hackney Central	Woolcock					Lever		Franklin		Gower						Watkins		
Kennington	Purchase					Harrison		Williams		Harvey						Matters		
Hammersmith North	Foreman							Gardner		Ashmead-Bartlett		Gardner						
Finsbury	Archer-Shee							Gillett										→
Hackney South	Bottomley				Erskine-Bolst			Morrison		Garro-Jones						Morrison		
Islington South	Higham					Garland		Cluse										
Islington West	Elliott					Despencer-Robertson		Montague										
Bethnal Green South-West	Wilson					Harris												
Bow and Bromley	Blair					Lansbury												
Camberwell North	Knights				Ammon													
Battersea North	Morris					Saklatvala		Hogbin		Saklatvala						Sanders		
Bermondsey West	Glanville					Salter		Kedward		Salter								
Bethnal Green North-East	Cornwall					Edmonds		Windsor								Nathan		
Lambeth North	Briant															Strauss		
Deptford	Bowerman																	
City of London (Two members)	Balfour				Grenfell													
City of London (Two members)	Banbury								Bowater									
Peckham	Richardson					Hughes				Dalton						Beckett		
Poplar South	Yeo					March												
Shoreditch	Addison					Price		Thurtle										
Southwark Central	Gilbert							→		Day								
Southwark North	Strauss							Haden-Guest					→	Strauss		Isaacs		
Southwark South East	Dawes			Naylor		Alexander		Naylor										
Stepney Limehouse	Pearce					Attlee												
Stepney Mile End	Preston							Scurr										
Stoke Newington	Jones							Spero		Jones								
Westminster St George's	Long			Erskine				→								Worthington-Evans		Cooper
Whitechapel and St George's	Kiley					Mathew	Gosling										Hall	
Norwood	Samuel					Greaves-Lord												
Paddington North	Perring															Bracken		
Paddington South	Harris					King											Taylor	
Putney	Samuel																	
Rotherhithe	Lort-Williams							Smith										
St Marylebone	Scott					Hogg									Rodd			
St Pancras North	Lorden							Marley		Fraser						Marley		
St Pancras South East	Hopkins							Romeril		Hopkins						Romeril		
St Pancras South West	Barnett															Carter		
Streatham	Lane-Mitchell																	
Wandsworth Central	Norton-Griffiths									Jackson						Church		→
Westminster Abbey	Burdett-Coutts			J. Nicholson					O. Nicholson									
Woolwich East	Crooks			Gee		Snell												Hicks
Woolwich West	Wood																	

==== 1931 to 1950 ====
Communist Conservative Independent Labour Independent Liberal Labour Labour Independent Group Liberal National Government National Labour National Liberal (1931–68)

Constituency	1931	32	33	34	35	1935	36	37	38	39	40	41	42	43	44	1945	45	46	47	48	49
Balham and Tooting	Butt						Doland									Adams					
Battersea North	Marsden					Sanders					Douglas							Jay			
Battersea South	Selley															Ganley					
Bermondsey West	Salter															Sargood					
Bethnal Green North-East	Nathan		→	→		Chater															
Bethnal Green South-West	Harris															Holman					
Bow and Bromley	Lansbury										Key										
Brixton	Colman															Lipton					
Camberwell North	Bateman					Ammon									Manning						
Camberwell North-West	Cassels					Guest										Corbet					
Chelsea	Hoare														Sidney	Noble					
Clapham	Leigh															Battley					
Deptford	Hanley					Green										Wilmot					
Dulwich	Hall	Smith														Vernon					
Finsbury	Gillett					Saville Woods										Platts-Mills				→	→
Fulham East	Vaughan-Morgan		Wilmot			Astor										Stewart					
Fulham West	Cobb								Summerskill												
Greenwich	Hume															Reeves					
Hackney Central	Lockwood					Watkins										Hynd					
Hackney North	Hudson															Goodrich					
Hackney South	Graves					Morrison										Butler					
Hammersmith North	Pickford			West		Pritt					→										→
Hammersmith South	Cooke															Adams					Williams
Hampstead	Balfour											Challen									
Holborn	Bevan					Tasker										Aitken					
Islington East	Cazalet															Fletcher					
Islington North	Goodman							Haden-Guest													
Islington South	Howard					Cluse															
Islington West	Donner					Montague													Evans		
Kennington	Harvey									Wilmot						Gibson					
Kensington North	Duncan															Rogers					
Constituency	1931	32	33	34	35	1935	36	37	38	39	40	41	42	43	44	1945	45	46	47	48	49
Kensington South	Davison																Law				
Lambeth North	Briant			Strauss						→	→										
Lewisham East	Pownall															Morrison					
Lewisham West	Dawson								Brooke							Skeffington					
City of London (Two members)	Grenfell				Anderson						Duncan										
City of London (Two members)	Bowater								Broadbridge								Assheton				
Norwood	Greaves-Lord				Sandys											Chamberlain					
Paddington North	Bracken															Mason-Macfarlane		Field			
Paddington South	Taylor																				
Peckham	Beatty						Silkin														
Poplar South	Adams												Guy								
Putney	S. Samuel				M. Samuel								Linstead								
Rotherhithe	Runge					Smith												Mellish			
St Marylebone	Rodd	Cunningham-Reid														Wakefield					
St Pancras North	Fraser							Grant-Ferris								House					Robinson
St Pancras South East	Beit															Jeger					
St Pancras South West	Mitcheson															Davies					
Shoreditch	Summersby					Thurtle															
Southwark Central	Horobin					Day					Martin									Jenkins	
Southwark North	Strauss									Isaacs											
Southwark South East	Powell					Naylor															
Stepney Limehouse	Attlee																				
Stepney Mile End	O'Donovan					Frankel										Piratin					
Stoke Newington	Jones															Weitzman					
Streatham	Lane-Mitchell									Robertson											
Wandsworth Central	Jackson							Nathan			Bevin										
Westminster Abbey	Nicholson	Herbert								Webbe											
Westminster St George's	Cooper															Howard					
Whitechapel and St George's	Janner					Hall							Edwards								
Woolwich East	Hicks																				
Woolwich West	Wood													Beech		Berry					
Constituency	1931	32	33	34	35	1935	36	37	38	39	40	41	42	43	44	1945	45	46	47	48	49

==== 1950 to 1974 ====
Conservative Labour Speaker

Constituency	1950	51	1951	53	54	1955	57	58	1959	59	63	1964	65	1966	68	69	1970	71	72
Battersea North	Jay																		
Battersea South	Ganley		Partridge									Perry							
Bermondsey	Mellish																		
Bethnal Green	Holman													Hilton					
Brixton	Lipton																		
Chelsea	Noble								Litchfield					Worsley					
Clapham	Gibson								Glyn			McKay					Shelton		
Deptford	Cooper		Plummer								J. Silkin								
Dulwich	Vernon		Jenkins									S. Silkin							
Fulham East / Fulham (1955)	Stewart																		
Fulham West	Summerskill					—N/a													
Greenwich	Reeves								Marsh									Barnett	
Hackney North and Stoke Newington	Weitzman																		
Hackney South / Hackney Central (1955)	Butler																Clinton-Davis		
Hammersmith North	Tomney																		
Hammersmith South / Barons Court (1955)	Williams								Carr			Richard							
Hampstead	Brooke													Whitaker			Finsberg		
Holborn and St Pancras South	S. Jeger			L. Jeger					Johnson-Smith			L. Jeger							
Islington East	Fletcher																Grant		
Islington North	Hughes		Fienburgh					Reynolds								O'Halloran			
Islington South West	Evans																George Cunningham		
Kensington North	Rogers																Douglas-Mann		
Kensington South	Spens								Roots						Rhys-Williams				
Lewisham North	Hudson						MacDermot		Chataway					Moyle					
Lewisham South	Morrison								Johnson										
Lewisham West	Price											McNair-Wilson		Dickens			Gummer		
Cities of London and Westminster	Webbe								Hylton-Foster	→			Smith				Tugendhat		
Norwood	Smyth													Fraser					
Paddington North	Field			Parkin												Latham			
Paddington South	de Chair		Allan											Scott					
Peckham	Corbet																		
Poplar	Key											Mikardo							
Putney	Linstead											Jenkins							
St Marylebone	Wakefield										Hogg						Baker		
St Pancras North	Robinson																Stallard		
Shoreditch and Finsbury	Thurtle				Collins			Cliffe				Brown							
Southwark	Isaacs								Gunter										Lamborn
Stepney	Edwards											Shore							
Streatham	Sandys																		
Vauxhall	Strauss																		
Wandsworth Central	Adams					Hughes-Young						Kerr							
Woolwich East	Bevin	Mayhew																	
Woolwich West	Steward								Turner			Hamling							

=== Greater London ===
==== North West London ====
The boroughs of Hillingdon, Harrow, Brent, Ealing, Barnet, Camden, Hammersmith & Fulham, Kensington & Chelsea and Westminster, and the City of London.

===== 1974 to 1997 =====
Conservative Labour Social Democratic Speaker

Constituency	Feb 74	Oct 74	77	1979	81	1983	86	1987	88	1992
Acton / Ealing Acton (1983)	Young									
Brent East	Freeson							Livingstone		
Brent North	Boyson									
Brent South	Pavitt							Pavitt		
Chelsea	Worsley	Scott								
Chipping Barnet	Maudling			Chapman						
St Marylebone	Baker									
Paddington / Westminster North (1983)	Latham			Wheeler						
City of London and Westminster South	Tugendhat		Brooke							
Ealing North	Molloy			Greenway						
Finchley	Thatcher									Booth
Fulham	Stewart			Stevens			Raynsford	Stevens		
Hammersmith North / Hammersmith (1983)	Tomney			Soley						
Hampstead / Hampstead and Highgate (1983)	Finsberg									Jackson
Harrow East	Dykes									
Harrow Central	Grant									
Harrow West	Page							Hughes		
Hayes and Harlington	Sandelson				→	Dicks				
Hendon North	Gorst									
Hendon South	Thomas							Marshall		
St Pancras North	Stallard									
Holborn & St Pancras South / Holborn & St Pancras (1983)	Jeger			Dobson						
Kensington	Rhys-Williams								Fishburn	
Ruislip and Northwood	Crowder			Wilkinson						
Southall / Ealing Southall (1983)	Bidwell									Khabra
Uxbridge	Shersby									
Constituency	Feb 74	Oct 74	77	1979	81	1983	86	1987	88	1992

===== 1997 to 2024 =====
Conservative Independent Labour Liberal Democrats

Constituency	1997	97	99	00	2001	03	2005	07	2010	2015	2017	2019	22	23
Brent E (1997–2010) / Brent C (2010–24)	Livingstone			→	Daisley	Teather				Butler				
Brent North	Gardiner													
Brent South	Boateng						Butler							
Chipping Barnet	Chapman						Villiers							
Cities of London & Westminster	Brooke				Field							Aiken		
Ealing, Acton & Shepherd's Bush / Ealing C & Acton (2010–24)	Soley						Slaughter		Bray	Huq			→	→
Ealing North	Pound											Murray		
Ealing Southall	Khabra							Sharma						
Finchley and Golders Green	Vis								Freer					
Hammersmith									Slaughter					
Hammersmith & Fulham / Chelsea & Fulham (2010–24)	Coleman						Hands							
Hampstead & Highgate (1997–2010) / H & Kilburn (2010–24)	Jackson									Siddiq				
Harrow East	McNulty								Blackman					
Harrow West	Thomas													
Hayes and Harlington	McDonnell													
Hendon	Dismore								Offord					
Holborn and St Pancras	Dobson									Starmer				
Kensington & Chelsea / Kensington (2010–24)	Clark		Portillo				Rifkind			Borwick	Coad	Buchan		
Regent's Park & Kensington N / Westminster N (2010–24)	Buck													
Ruislip and Northwood / Ruislip, Northwood and Pinner (2010–24)	Wilkinson						Hurd					Simmonds		
Uxbridge / Uxbridge and South Ruislip (2010–24)	Shersby	Randall								Johnson				Tuckwell
Constituency	1997	97	99	00	2001	03	2005	07	2010	2015	2017	2019	22	23

===== 2024 to present =====
Conservative Labour

Constituency	2024	26
Brent East	Butler	
Brent West	Gardiner	
Chipping Barnet	Tomlinson	
Chelsea & Fulham	Coleman	
Cities of London & Westminster	Blake	
Ealing Central & Acton	Huq	
Ealing North	Murray	
Ealing Southall	Costigan	
Finchley and Golders Green	Sackman	
Hammersmith & Chiswick	Slaughter	
Hampstead & Highgate	Siddiq	
Harrow East	Blackman	
Harrow West	Thomas	
Hayes and Harlington	McDonnell	
Hendon	Pinto-Duschinsky	
Holborn and St Pancras	Starmer	Abdi-Wali
Kensington & Bayswater	Powell	
Queen's Park & Maida Vale	Gould	
Ruislip, Northwood and Pinner	Simmonds	
Uxbridge and South Ruislip	Beales	
Constituency	2024	26

==== North East London ====
The boroughs of Barking & Dagenham, Enfield, Hackney, Haringey, Havering, Islington, Newham, Redbridge, Tower Hamlets and Waltham Forest.

===== 1974 to 1997 =====
Conservative Independent Labour Labour Social Democratic

Constituency	Feb 74	74	Oct 74	77	78	1979	81	82	83	1983	84	1987	1992	94
Barking	Richardson													
Dagenham	Parker									Gould				Church
Hornchurch	Lee Williams					Squire								
Romford	Neubert													
Upminster	Loveridge													
Chingford	Tebbit												Duncan Smith	
Ilford North	Iremonger		Miller		Bendall									
Ilford South	Shaw					Thorne							Gapes	
Leyton	Magee							→		Cohen				
Wanstead and Woodford	Jenkin											Arbuthnot		
Walthamstow	Deakins											Summerson	Gerrard	
Bethnal Green & Bow / B'nal Green & Stepney (1983)	Mikardo									Shore				
Newham North East	Prentice			→		Leighton								Timms
Newham North West	Lewis									Banks				
Newham South	Jones	Spearing												
Stepney & Poplar / Bow & Poplar (1983)	Shore									Mikardo		Gordon		
Hackney North and Stoke Newington	Weitzman					Roberts						Abbott		
Hackney Central	Davis													
Hackney S & Shoreditch	Brown						→			Sedgemore				
Islington North	O'Halloran						→		→	Corbyn				
Islington Central	Grant						→							
Islington South & Finsbury	Cunningham							→		Chris Smith				
Edmonton	Graham									Twinn				
Enfield North	Davies					Eggar								
Southgate / Enfield Southgate (1983)	Berry										Portillo			
Hornsey / Hornsey & Wood Green (1983)	Rossi												Roche	
Wood Green	Butler					Race								
Tottenham	Atkinson											Grant		
Constituency	Feb 74	74	Oct 74	77	78	1979	81	82	83	1983	84	1987	1992	94

===== 1997 to 2024 =====
Change UK Conservative Independent Labour Liberal Democrats Respect

Constituency	1997	00	2001	2005	2010	2015	2017	19	2019	20	23	24	
Barking	Hodge												
Dagenham / Dagenham & Rainham (2010)	Church		Cruddas										
Hornchurch	Cryer			Brokenshire									
Upminster / Hornchurch and Upminster (2010)	Darvill		Watkinson				Lopez						
Romford	Gordon		Rosindell										
Chingford and Woodford Green	Duncan Smith												
Ilford North	Perham			Scott		Streeting							
Ilford South	Gapes							→	Tarry				
Leyton and Wanstead	Cohen				Cryer								
Walthamstow	Gerrard				Creasy								
Bethnal Green & Bow	King			Galloway	Ali								
East Ham	Timms												
Poplar & Canning Town / P & Limehouse (2010)	Fitzpatrick								Begum				
West Ham	Banks			Brown									
Hackney North and Stoke Newington	Abbott										→		→
Hackney South & Shoreditch	Sedgemore			Hillier									
Islington North	Corbyn									→			
Islington South & Finsbury	Smith			Thornberry									
Enfield North	Ryan				de Bois	Ryan		→	Clark				
Enfield Southgate	Twigg			Burrowes			Charalambous				→	→	
Edmonton	Love					Osamor						→	→
Hornsey & Wood Green	Roche			Featherstone		West							
Tottenham	Grant	Lammy											
Constituency	1997	00	2001	2005	2010	2015	2017	19	2019	20	23	24	

===== 2024 to present =====
Conservative Independent Labour Reform UK Your Party

Constituency	2024	25	26
Barking	Caliskan		
Dagenham & Rainham	Mullane		
Hornchurch and Upminster	Lopez		
Romford	Rosindell		→
Chingford and Woodford Green	Duncan Smith		
Ilford North	Streeting		
Ilford South	Athwal		
Leyton and Wanstead	Bailey		
Walthamstow	Creasy		
Bethnal Green & Stepney	Ali		
Stratford and Bow	Kumaran		
East Ham	Timms		
Poplar & Limehouse	Begum		
West Ham & Beckton	Asser		
Hackney North and Stoke Newington	Abbott	→	
Hackney South & Shoreditch	Hillier		
Islington North	Corbyn		→
Islington South & Finsbury	Thornberry		
Enfield North	Clark		
Southgate & Wood Green	Charalambous		
Edmonton & Winchmore Hill	Osamor		
Hornsey & Friern Barnet	West		
Tottenham	Lammy		
Constituency	2024	25	26

==== South West London ====
The boroughs of Croydon, Hounslow, Kingston, Merton, Richmond, Sutton and Wandsworth.

===== 1974 to 1997 =====
Conservative Labour Liberal Social Democratic Speaker

Constituency	Feb 74	Oct 74	76	1979	81	82	1983	83	1987	1992
Battersea North / Battersea ('83)	Jay						Dubs		Bowis	
Battersea South	Perry			Dubs						
Brentford & Isleworth	Hayhoe									Deva
Carshalton	Carr		Forman							
Croydon Central	Moore									Beresford
Croydon North East	Weatherill							Weatherill		Congdon
Croydon North West	Taylor				Pitt		Malins			Wicks
Croydon South	Clark									Ottaway
Feltham and Heston	R. Kerr						Ground			Keen
Kingston upon Thames	Lamont									
Mitcham / Mitcham and Morden ('83)	Douglas-Mann				→	Rumbold				
Putney	Jenkins			Mellor						
Richmond / Richmond & Barnes ('83)	Royle						Hanley			
Surbiton	Fisher						Tracey			
Sutton and Cheam	Macfarlane									Maitland
Tooting	Cox									
Twickenham	Jessel									
Wimbledon	Havers								Goodson-Wickes	

===== 1997 to 2024 =====
Conservative Independent Labour Liberal Democrats

Constituency	1997	2001	2005	07	2010	11	12	2015	16	2017	19	2019
Battersea	Linton				Ellison					de Cordova		
Brentford and Isleworth	Keen				Macleod			Cadbury				
Carshalton and Wallington	Brake											Colburn
Croydon Central	Davies		Pelling	→	Barwell					Jones		
Croydon North	Wicks						Reed					
Croydon South	Ottaway							Philp				
Feltham and Hestonc	Keen					Malhotra						
Kingston & Surbiton	Davey							Berry		Davey		
Mitcham and Morden	McDonagh											
Richmond Park	Tonge		Kramer		Goldsmith				Olney	Goldsmith		Olney
Putney	Colman		Greening								→	Anderson
Sutton and Cheam	Burstow							Scully				
Tooting	Cox		Khan						Allin-Khan			
Twickenham	Cable							Mathias		Cable		Wilson
Wimbledon	Casale		Hammond									

===== 2024 to present =====
Conservative Labour Liberal Democrats

Constituency	2024
Battersea	de Cordova
Brentford and Isleworth	Cadbury
Carshalton and Wallington	Dean
Croydon East	Irons
Croydon West	Jones
Croydon South	Philp
Feltham and Heston	Malhotra
Kingston & Surbiton	Davey
Mitcham and Morden	McDonagh
Richmond Park	Olney
Putney	Anderson
Sutton and Cheam	Taylor
Tooting	Allin-Khan
Twickenham	Wilson
Wimbledon	Kohler

==== South East London ====
The boroughs of Bexley, Bromley, Greenwich, Lambeth, Lewisham and Southwark.

===== 1974 to 1997 =====
Conservative Labour Liberal Social Democratic (1983–88) Continuing Social Democratic (1988–90) Independent Social Democrat

Constituency	Feb 74	74	Oct 74	75	78	1979	81	82	83	1983	87	1987	88	89	90	1992
Beckenham	Goodhart															Merchant
Bermondsey / Southwark & Bermondsey (1983)	Mellish								Hughes				→			
Bexleyheath	Townsend															
Chislehurst	Sims															
Dulwich	S. Silkin									Bowden						Jowell
Erith and Crayford	Wellbeloved						→			Evennett						
Greenwich	Barnett										Barnes		→		→	Raynsford
Lambeth Central	Lipton				Tilley											
Lewisham Deptford	J. Silkin											Ruddock				
Lewisham East	Moyle									Moynihan						Prentice
Lewisham West	Price									Maples						Dowd
Norwood	Fraser															
Orpington	Stanbrook															Horam
Peckham	Lamborn							Harman								
Ravensbourne	Hunt															
Sidcup / Old Bexley and Sidcup (1983)	Heath															
Streatham	Shelton															Hill
Vauxhall	Strauss					Holland								Hoey		
Woolwich East / Woolwich (1983)	Mayhew	→	Cartwright				→						→		→	Austin
Woolwich West / Eltham (1983)	Hamling			Bottomley												

===== 1997 to 2024 =====
Change UK Conservative Independent Labour Liberal Liberal Democrats

Constituency	1997	97	2001	2005	06	08	2010	2015	2017	18	19		2019	21	22	23	24
Beckenham	Merchant	Lait					Stewart									→	→
Bexleyheath & Crayford	Beard			Evennett													
Bromley & Chislehurst	Forth				Neill												
Camberwell and Peckham	Harman																
Dulwich and West Norwood	Jowell							Hayes									
Eltham	Efford																
Erith & Thamesmead	Austin						Pearce						Oppong-Asare				
Greenwich and Woolwich	Raynsford							Pennycook									
Lewisham Deptford	Ruddock							Foxcroft									
Lewisham East	Prentice						Alexander			Daby							
Lewisham West / LW & Penge (2010–24)	Dowd								Reeves								
North Southwark & Bermondsey / Berm & Old Swk (2010–24)	Hughes							Coyle							→	→	
Old Bexley and Sidcup	Heath		Conway			→	Brokenshire							French			
Orpington	Horam						Johnson						Bacon				
Streatham	Hill						Umunna				→	→	Ribeiro-Addy				
Vauxhall	Hoey												Eshalomi				

===== 2024 to present =====
Conservative Labour Liberal Democrats

Constituency	2024
Beckenham & Penge	Conlon
Bermondsey & Old Southwark	Coyle
Bexleyheath & Crayford	Francis
Bromley & Biggin Hill	Fortune
Clapham and Brixton Hill	Ribeiro-Addy
Dulwich and West Norwood	Hayes
Eltham & Chislehurst	Efford
Erith & Thamesmead	Oppong-Asare
Greenwich and Woolwich	Pennycook
Lewisham North	Foxcroft
Lewisham East	Daby
Lewisham West & East Dulwich	Reeves
Peckham	Fahnbulleh
Old Bexley and Sidcup	French
Orpington	Bacon
Streatham & Croydon North	Reed
Vauxhall & Camberwell Green	Eshalomi

== 2024 results ==
Results map of the 2024 election

The number of votes cast for each political party who fielded candidates in constituencies in the London region in the 2024 general election were as follows:

Party	Vote	%	Change from 2019	Seats	Change from 2019 (actual)	Change from 2019 (notional)
Labour	1,432,622	43.0	▼5.2	59	▲10	▲7
Conservative	685,082	20.5	▼11.5	9	▼12	▼11
Liberal Democrats	367,424	11.0	▼3.9	6	▲3	▲3
Green	335,479	10.1	▲7.0	0	0	0
Reform UK	289,459	8.7	▲7.3	0	0	0
Others	223,916	6.7	▲6.2	1	▲1	▲1
Total	3,333,982	100.0		75	▲2	

== Results history ==
Primary data source: House of Commons research briefing – General election results from 1918 to 2019

=== Percentage votes ===
London votes %

Key:

- CON – Conservative Party, including National Liberal Party up to 1966
- LAB – Labour Party, including Labour and Co-operative Party
- LIB – Liberal Party up to 1979; SDP–Liberal Alliance 1983 & 1987; Liberal Democrats from 1992
- UKIP – UK Independence Party 2010 to 2017 (included in Other up to 2005 and from 2019)
- REF – Reform UK (2019 – Brexit Party)
- GRN – Green Party of England and Wales (included in Other up to 2005)

=== Seats ===
London seats

Key:

- CON – Conservative Party, including National Liberal Party up to 1966
- LAB – Labour Party, including Labour and Co-operative Party
- LIB – Liberal Party up to 1979; SDP–Liberal Alliance 1983 & 1987; Liberal Democrats from 1992
- OTH – 1945 – (1) Communist Party; (2) Independent Labour (Denis Pritt); 2005 – Respect (George Galloway); 2024 – Independent (Jeremy Corbyn)

=== Maps ===
==== Inner London ====
1885

1886

1892

1895

1900

1906

Jan 1910

Dec 1910
1918

1922

1923

1924

1929

1931

1935

1945
1950

1951

1955

1959

1964

1966

1970

==== Greater London ====
Feb 1974

Oct 1974

1979

1983

1987

1992

1997

2001

2005

2010

2015

2017

2019

2024

These are maps of the results of the last 14 general elections in London.

- Red represents seats won by MPs from the Labour Party.
- Blue represents seats won by MPs from the Conservative Party.
- Amber represents seats won by MPs from the Liberal Democrats.
- Green (in 2005) represents the seat won by the sole MP from the Respect Party, George Galloway.
- Yellow (in 1983 and 1987) represents the seat won by the sole MP from the Liberal Party, Simon Hughes, who continued to be an MP of the Liberal Democrats.
- Purple represents the two seats won by MPs from the Social Democratic Party. They were John Cartwright (formerly Labour), and Rosie Barnes.
- Grey (in 2024) represents seats won by an independent politician (Jeremy Corbyn).

== See also ==
- Constituencies of the Parliament of the United Kingdom
- List of electoral divisions in Greater London
- List of electoral wards in Greater London
- London Assembly constituencies
