= Willoughby Dickinson, 1st Baron Dickinson =

British politician (1859–1943)

The Right Honourable The Lord Dickinson KBE, PC
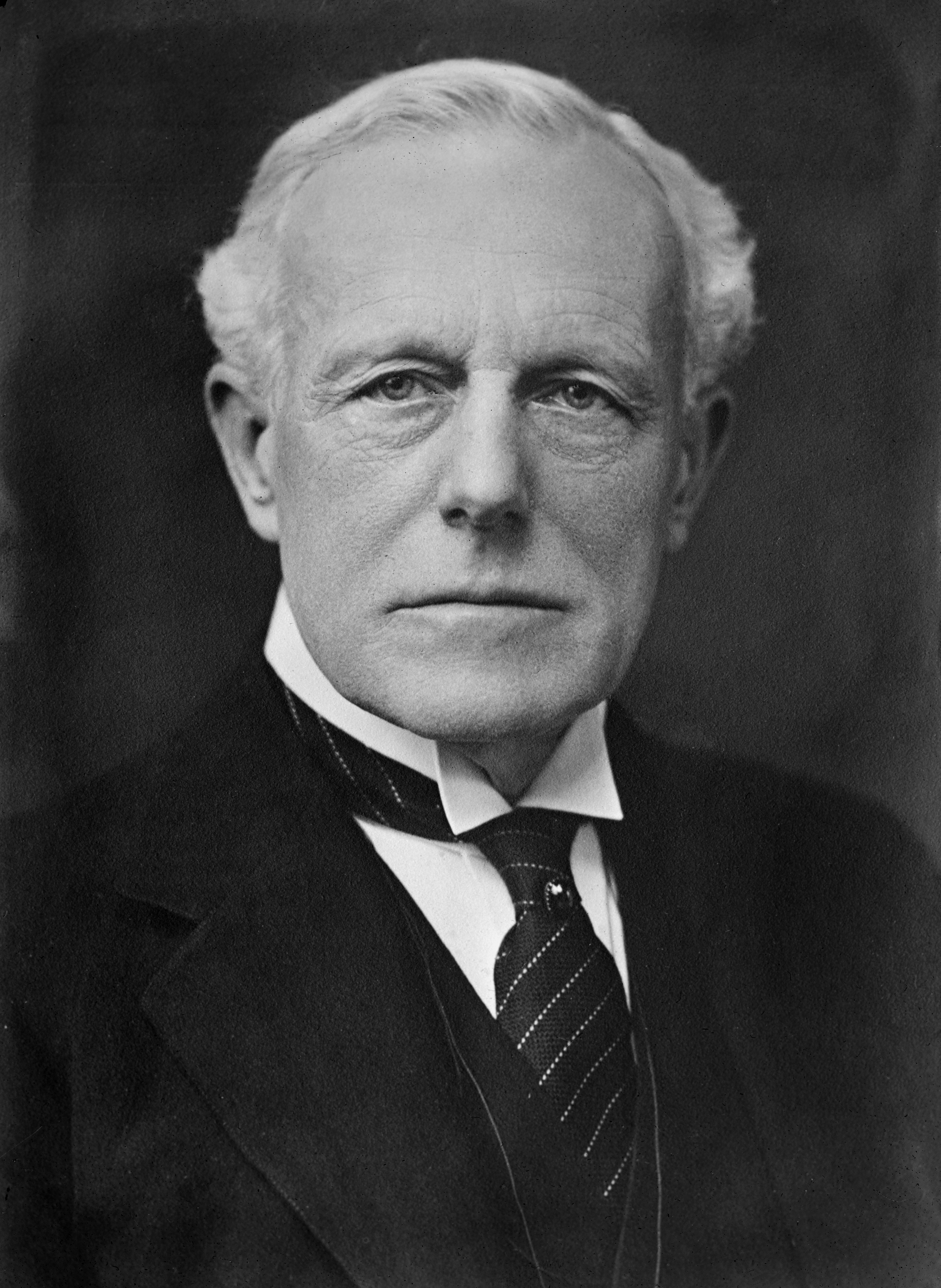
- Sir Willoughby Dickinson

Member of Parliament for St Pancras North
- In office 1906–1918
- Preceded by: Edward Robert Pacy Moon
- Succeeded by: John William Lorden

Personal details
- Born: 9 April 1859
- Died: 31 May 1943 (aged 84)
- Party: Liberal Party
- Spouse: Elizabeth Meade (m. 1891)
- Children: 3
- Parent: Sebastian Stewart Dickinson (father)
- Relatives: Frances Joan Dickinson (daughter)
- Education: Eton College; Trinity College, Cambridge

Willoughby Hyett Dickinson, 1st Baron Dickinson, KBE, PC (9 April 1859 – 31 May 1943), was a British Liberal Party politician. He was Member of Parliament for St. Pancras North from 1906 to 1918. He was an influential proponent of establishing a League of Nations after the First World War.

== Background ==
Dickinson was the son of Sebastian Stewart Dickinson, Member of Parliament for Stroud. He was educated at Eton College and Trinity College, Cambridge. He married Elizabeth, daughter of General Sir Richard John Meade, in 1891. They had three children, one of whom was Frances Joan Dickinson, Baroness Northchurch. On 18 January 1930 he was raised to the peerage as Baron Dickinson, of Painswick in the County of Gloucester. Lord Dickinson died in May 1943, aged 84, and was succeeded in the barony by his grandson Richard, his only son the Hon. Richard Sebastian Willoughby Dickinson having predeceased him. Willoughby Dickinson's sister, Frances May, an anaesthetist, was the first wife of surgeon Sir James Berry.

== Political career ==
Dickinson in 1906

He served as vice-chairman of the recently formed London County Council from 1892 to 1896 and then its chairman from March 1900 to March 1901. From 1896 until 1918, he was chair of the London Liberal Federation. He was an assiduous supporter of women's suffrage, promoting a number of measures in Parliament to get the vote for women. Dickinson was made a Privy Counsellor in 1914. He did not stand for parliament again. He was later secretary-general of the World Alliance for International Friendship, and from 1931 chairman of its International Council. In 1930, he joined the Labour Party, but the following year he was part of the National Labour Organisation split.

=== Electoral record ===
General election 1900: St Pancras North
Party	Candidate	Votes	%	±%
Conservative	Edward Robert Pacy Moon	3,056	56.6	+4.9
Liberal	Willoughby Dickinson	2,345	43.4	−4.4
Majority		711	13.2	+9.3
Turnout		5,401	71.2	−4.4
Registered electors		7,582		
Conservative hold		Swing	+4.7	

General election 1906: St Pancras North
Party	Candidate	Votes	%	±%
Liberal	Willoughby Dickinson	4,094	60.8	+17.4
Conservative	Edward Robert Pacy Moon	2,643	39.2	−17.4
Majority		1,451	21.6	n/a
Turnout		6,737	84.0	+12.8
Registered electors		8,021		
Liberal gain from Conservative		Swing	+17.4	

General election January 1910 St Pancras North
Party	Candidate	Votes	%	±%
Liberal	Willoughby Dickinson	4,970	58.0	−2.8
Conservative	H A Pakenham	3,603	42.0	+2.8
Majority		1,367	16.0	−5.6
Turnout		8,573	85.9	+1.9
Registered electors		9,977		
Liberal hold		Swing	−2.8	

General election December 1910 St Pancras North
Party	Candidate	Votes	%	±%
Liberal	Willoughby Dickinson	4,407	57.7	−0.3
Conservative	Arthur Moon	3,230	42.3	+0.3
Majority		1,177	15.4	−0.6
Turnout		7,637	76.5	−9.4
Registered electors		9,977		
Liberal hold		Swing	−0.3	

General election 1918: St Pancras North
Party		Candidate	Votes	%	±%
C	Unionist	John William Lorden	7,260	41.4	−0.9
	Liberal	Willoughby Dickinson	5,596	32.0	−25.7
	Labour	John Gilbert Dale	4,651	26.6	n/a
Majority			1,664	9.4	n/a
Turnout			33,747	51.9	−24.6
	Unionist gain from Liberal		Swing	+12.4	
C indicates candidate endorsed by the coalition government.

General election 1922: St Pancras North
Party	Candidate	Votes	%	±%
Unionist	John William Lorden	9,156	37.7	−3.7
Labour	John Gilbert Dale	8,165	33.6	+7.0
Liberal	Willoughby Dickinson	6,979	28.7	−3.3
Majority		991	4.1	−5.3
Turnout			66.0	+14.1
Unionist hold		Swing	−5.3	

== Arms ==
Coat of arms of Willoughby Dickinson, 1st Baron Dickinson
Crest Issuant from clouds a dexter cubit arm erect the hand holding an olive branch fructed all Proper. Escutcheon Or a bend cottised between two lions passant Gules. Supporters Dexter a falcon Proper collared and lined Or sinister a dove holding in the beak an olive branch both Proper. Motto Seek Agreement

Political offices
Preceded by Lord Welby	Chairman of the London County Council; 1900–1901	Succeeded by Andrew Mitchell Torrance
Parliament of the United Kingdom
Preceded by Edward Robert Pacy Moon	Member of Parliament for St Pancras North; 1906–1918	Succeeded by John William Lorden
Peerage of the United Kingdom
New creation	Baron Dickinson; 1930–1943	Succeeded by Richard Clavering Hyett Dickinson
