= 1983 Dissolution Honours =

British government recognitions

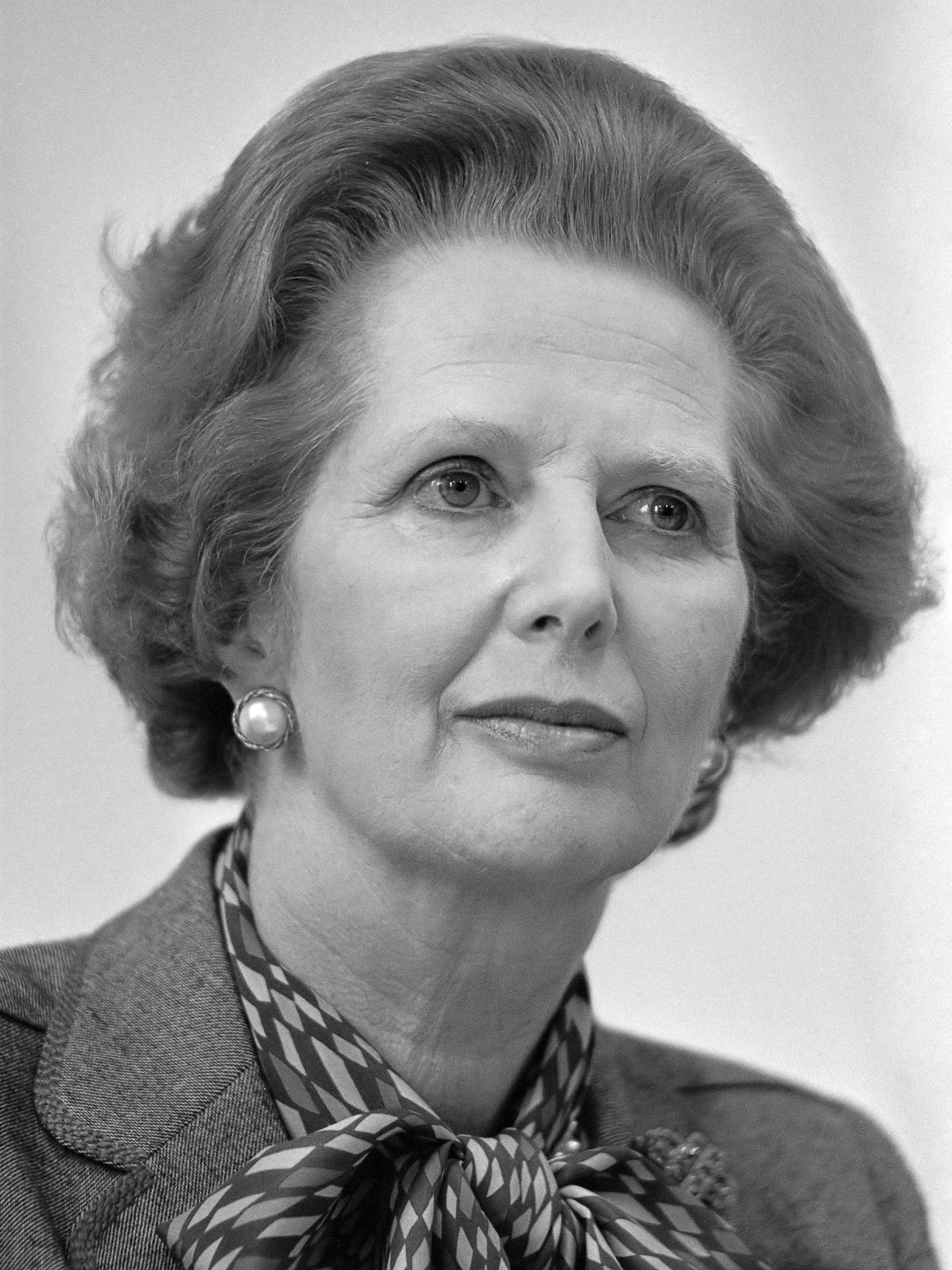
Prime Minister Margaret Thatcher pictured in 1983

The 1983 Dissolution Honours List was gazetted on 21 July 1983 following the advice of the Prime Minister, Margaret Thatcher.

The recipients are shown below as they were styled before their new honour.

== Life Peers ==
=== Conservative ===
- The Right Honourable Sir John Benedict Eden Bt, Member of Parliament for the West Division of Bournemouth 1954–83. Minister of Posts and Telecommunications 1972–74. Minister of State, Department of Trade and Industry 1970–72.
- John Bruce-Gardyne, Member of Parliament for South Angus 1964–74; Knutsford 1979–83. Economic Secretary to the Treasury 1981–83.
- Sir Donald Kaberry Bt TD DL, Member of Parliament for the North West Division of Leeds 1950–83. Parliamentary Secretary, Board of Trade 1955. Assistant Government Whip 1951–55.
- The Right Honourable Sir Angus Edward Upton Maude TD, Member of Parliament for South Ealing 1950–58; Stratford-on-Avon 1963–83. Paymaster General 1979–81.
- The Right Honourable John Wynne William Peyton, Member of Parliament for the Yeovil Division of Somerset 1951–1983. Minister of Transport Industries 1970–74. Minister of Transport 1970.
- Sir Anthony Henry Fanshawe Royle KCMG, Member of Parliament for Richmond-upon-Thames 1959–83. Parliamentary Under Secretary of State, Foreign and Commonwealth Office 1970–74.
- The Right Honourable Sir Derek Colclough Walker-Smith Bt TD QC, Member of Parliament for the East Division of Hertfordshire 1950–83. Minister of Health 1957–60. Minister of State, Board of Trade, 1957. Economic Secretary to the Treasury 1956–57.

=== Labour ===
- The Right Honourable Joel Barnett, Member of Parliament for the Heywood and Royton Division of Lancashire 1964–83. Chief Secretary to the Treasury 1974–79.
- Neil George Carmichael, Member of Parliament for the Woodside Division of Glasgow 1962–74; Kelvingrove Division of Glasgow 1974–83. Parliamentary Under-Secretary of State, Department of Industry 1975–76. Parliamentary Under-Secretary of State, Department of the Environment 1974–75. Parliamentary Secretary, Ministry of Technology 1969–70. Parliamentary Under-Secretary of State, Ministry of Transport 1967–69.
- Joseph Jabez Dean, Member of Parliament for Leeds West 1974–83. Assistant Government Whip 1978–79.
- The Right Honourable David Hedley Ennals, Member of Parliament for Dover 1964–70; Norwich North 1974–83. Secretary of State for Social Services 1976–79. Minister of State, Foreign and Commonwealth Office 1974–76. Minister of State, Department of Health and Social Security 1968–70.
- Thomas Edward Graham, Member of Parliament for the Enfield Division of Edmonton 1974–83. Lord Commissioner, H.M. Treasury 1976–79.
- Albert William Stallard, Member of Parliament for St Pancras North 1970–74; Camden, St Pancras North 1974–83. Lord Commissioner, H.M. Treasury 1978–79. Assistant Government Whip 1976–78.
- David Leonard Stoddart, Member of Parliament for Swindon 1970–83. Lord Commissioner, H.M. Treasury 1976–77. Assistant Government Whip 1975–76.
- The Right Honourable Sir James Harold Wilson KG OBE, Member of Parliament for Ormskirk 1945–50; Huyton Division of Lancashire 1950–83. Prime Minister and First Lord of the Treasury 1964–70; 1974–76. Leader of the Opposition 1963–64; 1970–74. President of the Board of Trade 1947–51.

=== Other ===
- Gerard Fitt, Member of Parliament for the West Division of Belfast 1966–83. Leader, Social Democratic and Labour Party in Northern Ireland 1970–79. Independent Socialist 1979–83.
- The Right Honourable Joseph Grimond TD, Member of Parliament for Orkney and Shetland 1950–83. Leader of the Parliamentary Liberal Party 1956–67 and 1976.

== Privy Counsellor ==
- James Henry Molyneaux MP, Member of Parliament for the South Division of Antrim 1970–83; Lagan Valley 1983–. Leader Ulster Unionist Party 1979–.

== Knight Bachelor ==
- The Honourable Anthony George Berry MP, Member of Parliament for the Southgate Division of Enfield since 1964. Treasurer, H.M. Household (Deputy Chief Whip) 1983–. Comptroller, H.M. Household 1981–83. Vice-Chamberlain, H.M. Household 1979–81.
- Stephen Lewis Edmonstone Hastings MC, Member of Parliament for Mid-Bedfordshire 1960–83.
- Hugh Alexis Louis Rossi MP, Member of Parliament for Hornsey 1966–74; Hornsey Division of Haringey 1974–83; Hornsey and Wood Green 1983–. Minister of State, Department of Health and Social Security 1981–83. Minister of State, Northern Ireland Office 1979–81.

== Order of St Michael and St George ==
=== Knight Commander of the Order of St Michael and St George (KCMG) ===
- The Right Honourable Humphrey Edward Gregory Atkins MP, Member of Parliament for Merton and Morden 1955–70; Spelthorne Division of Surrey since 1970. Lord Privy Seal 1981–82. Secretary of State for Northern Ireland 1979–81. Opposition Chief Whip 1974–79. Government Chief Whip 1973–74.
- The Right Honourable Peter Allan Renshaw Blaker MP, Member of Parliament for the South Division of Blackpool since 1964. Minister of State, Ministry of Defence 1981–83. Minister of State, Foreign and Commonwealth Office 1979–81. Parliamentary Under Secretary of State, Ministry of Defence 1972–74.
