= Thomas Henry Bolton =

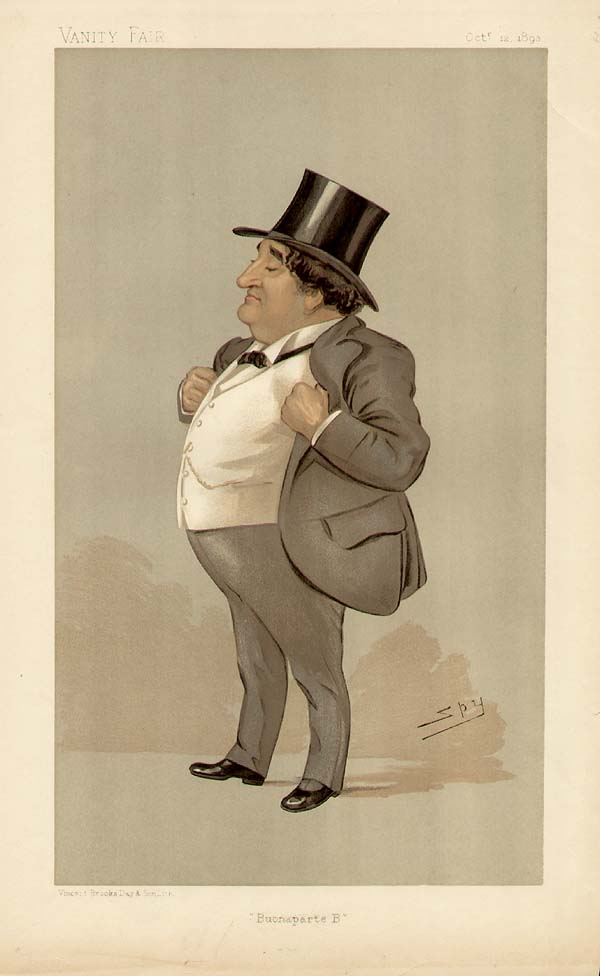
"Buonaparte B". Caricature by Spy published in Vanity Fair in 1893.

Thomas Henry Bolton (February 1841 – 24 September 1916) was an English solicitor and a Liberal and Liberal Unionist Party politician who sat in the House of Commons between 1885 and 1895.

Bolton was born at Clerkenwell, the son of Thomas Bolton. He was admitted a solicitor 1869 and became a partner in the firm of Bolton & Mote, of Gray's Inn, London.

Bolton was elected at the 1885 general election as Member of Parliament (MP) for St Pancras North, but lost the seat in the 1886 general election. He regained the seat in a by election in 1890 after his successor succeeded to the peerage, and was re-elected in 1892. Shortly after he defected to the Liberal Unionists. Bolton did not stand again at the 1895 general election.

Bolton lived at South Binns, Heathfield, Sussex, and died at the age of 75.

Bolton married Elizabeth Ann Wegg in 1861.

Parliament of the United Kingdom
New constituency See Marylebone constituency	Member of Parliament for St Pancras North; 1885 – 1886	Succeeded by Charles Cochrane-Baillie
Preceded by Charles Cochrane-Baillie	Member of Parliament for St Pancras North; 1890 – 1895	Succeeded by Edward Robert Pacy Moon
