= James Marley =

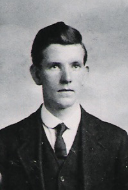
- James Marley, circa 1917

Member of Parliament for St Pancras (North)

Personal details
- Born: 6 May 1893 Shotts, Lanarkshire
- Died: 11 April 1954 Bromley, Kent
- Party: Labour

James Marley (6 May 1893 – 11 April 1954) was a schoolmaster and a Labour politician who sat in the House of Commons between December 1923 and October 1924 and, again, between May 1929 and October 1931. He was both the seventh and ninth MP for St Pancras (North).

At the 1923 general election held on 6 December, Marley won his first seat in Parliament with a majority of 2,872 votes; unseating the sitting Unionist MP, John William Lorden. in what resulted in the first minority Labour government. It was a short-lived victory for him and, in a hung parliament, his seat was taken, at the 1924 general election by Conservative, Ian Fraser (later Baron Fraser of Lonsdale). He remained in politics, however, and was re-elected to the St Pancras North seat once again in May 1929, and retained the seat until 27 October 1931, when he fell prey again to a hung parliament, the seat being regained by Ian Fraser of the Conservative Party.

== Biography ==
James was the son of William Marley (1869–1948) and Margaret Shannon (1874–1922). He was born in Shotts, Lanarkshire, Scotland and moved to London in 1917 to take up a teaching post at St Dominic's Boys' School in Hampstead (1917–19). During this time, he met and married his wife Alice Louise Pilgrim (1880–1945) the daughter of William Pilgrim, (1845–1922) an Inspector for the Society for the Prevention of Cruelty to Animals and a former policeman for the London Metropolitan Police. The marriage between James Marley and Alice Louise Pilgrim took place in Shotts, Lanarkshire on 16 May 1920. Marley died in Bromley, Kent in April 1954, aged 60.

Marley worked at the following schools in Scotland and London:

- 1915–1916 St Francis Xavier's School, Carfin, Motherwell, Scotland
- 1917–1919 St Dominic's Boys' School, Hampstead, London
- 1919 :::::: St Peter's Italian R.C. School, Herbal Hill, Holborn, London
- 1919–1923 St Dominic's Boys' School, Hampstead, London
- 1925–1929 St Francis Boys' School, North Kensington, London

== Education ==
- St Aloysius College, Glasgow
- St Mungo's Academy, Glasgow
- St Mary's Training College, Hammersmith (now in Twickenham)
- London School of Economics, University of London

== Gandhi's visit to the UK ==
In September 1931, Marley was amongst those who welcomed Mohandas Karamchand Gandhi at Folkestone when he visited the United Kingdom for the second Round Table conference.

== Robeson Affair ==
In April 1929, the African-American concert singer Paul Robeson was refused entry to a London hotel. He wrote to Marley complaining about his treatment and the letter was made public, causing uproar in the UK and the US. The matter led to a debate in Parliament later that year (October 1929) into racial discrimination by English hotels.

Parliament of the United Kingdom
Preceded by John Lorden	Member of Parliament for St Pancras North; 1923–1924	Succeeded by Ian Fraser
Preceded by Ian Fraser	Member of Parliament for St Pancras North; 1929–1931	Succeeded by Ian Fraser
