= Baron Lamington =

Extinct barony in the Peerage of the United Kingdom

Barony of Lamington
- Blazon: Arms: Quarterly: 1st and 4th azure, nine estoiles, three, three, two, and one or (Baillie); 2nd and 3rd argent, a chevron gules between three boars’ heads erased azure; on a chief wavy of the third, a sphinx couchant of the field (Cochrane).; Crests: 1st: issuant out of a naval coronet or, a dexter arm embowed azure, cuffed argent, holding in the hand a flagstaff proper, thereon hoisted the flag of a Rear-Adm. of the white; i.e. argent, a cross gules thereon the words “St. Domingo” in letters of gold; 2nd: A boar’s head erased proper; 3rd a horse passant argent..; Supporters: On either side a boar proper, gorged with a collar or, pendent therefrom an escutcheon of the arms of Baillie, as in the arms.
- Creation date: 26 April 1880
- Created by: Queen Victoria
- Peerage: Peerage of the United Kingdom
- First holder: Alexander Dundas Ross Cochrane-Wishart-Baillie, 1st Baron Lamington
- Last holder: Victor Alexander Brisbane William Cochrane-Baillie, 3rd Baron Lamington
- Status: extinct
- Motto: QUID CLARIS ASTRIS (What is brighter than the stars ?)

Baron Lamington, of Lamington in the County of Lanark, was a title in the Peerage of the United Kingdom. It was created in 1880 for Alexander Baillie-Cochrane, a long-standing Conservative Member of Parliament and old friend of Benjamin Disraeli. He was the son of Admiral of the Fleet Sir Thomas John Cochrane, son of Admiral the Honourable Sir Alexander Cochrane, sixth son of Thomas Cochrane, 8th Earl of Dundonald (see the Earl of Dundonald for earlier history of the Cochrane family). Lord Lamington was succeeded by his son, the second Baron. He represented St Pancras North in the House of Commons and served as Governor of Queensland and of Bombay. On his death the title passed to his son, the third Baron. He was childless and on his death in 1951 the barony became extinct. The Lamington cake is said to be named after the second baron.

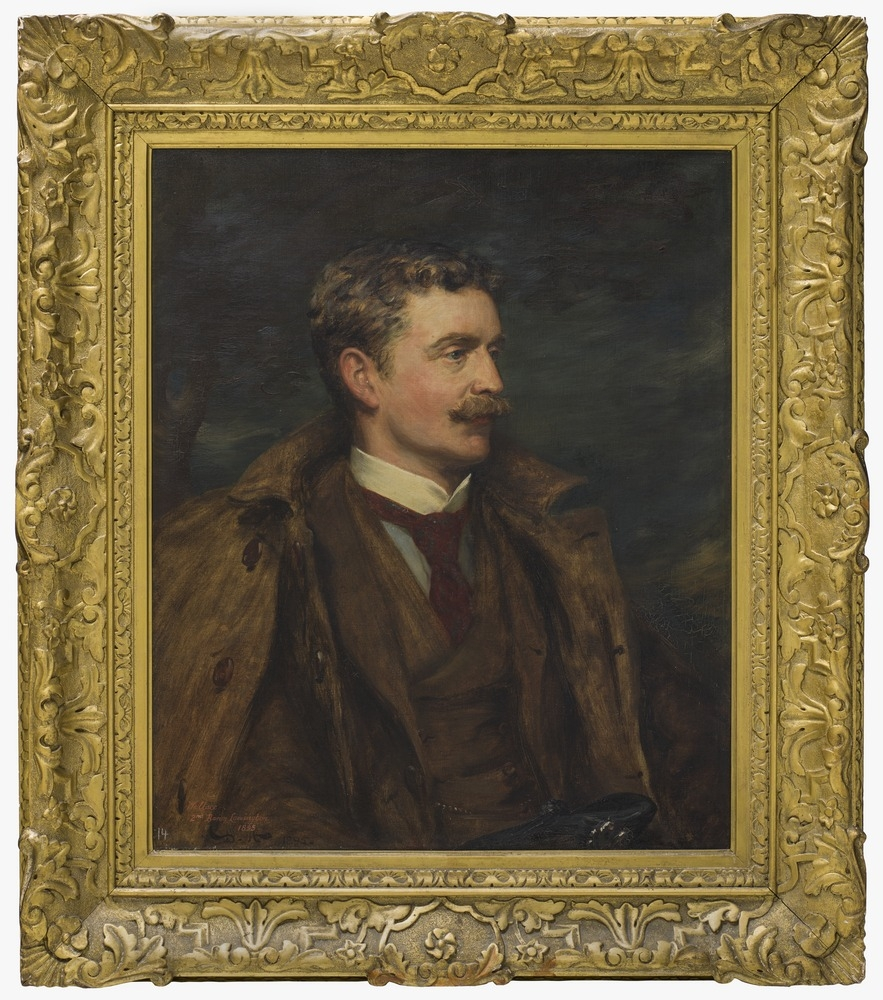
Framed oil painting by Robert Duddingstone Herdman, depicting Charles Wallace Alexander Napier Cochrane-Baillie, 2nd Baron Lamington, Governor of Queensland, 1896-1901. Via State Library of Queensland.

== Barons Lamington (1880) ==
- Alexander Dundas Ross Cochrane-Wishart-Baillie, 1st Baron Lamington (1816–1890)
- Charles Wallace Alexander Napier Ross Baillie-Cochrane, 2nd Baron Lamington (1860–1940)
- Victor Alexander Brisbane William Cochrane-Baillie, 3rd Baron Lamington (1896–1951)

== See also ==
- Earl of Dundonald
- Baron Cochrane of Cults
