= 1937 St Pancras North by-election =

UK Parliamentary by-election

The 1937 St Pancras North by-election was held on 4 February 1937. The by-election was held due to the resignation of the incumbent Conservative MP, Ian Fraser. It was won by the Conservative candidate Robert Grant-Ferris.

St Pancras North by-election, 1937
Party	Candidate	Votes	%	±%
Conservative	Robert Grant-Ferris	11,744	50.6	−3.1
Labour	Henry Montague Tibbles	11,476	49.4	+7.1
Majority		268	1.2	−10.2
Turnout		23,220	50.9	−13.4
Conservative hold		Swing		
