= Charles Cochrane-Baillie, 2nd Baron Lamington =

English politician and governor (1860–1940)

The Right Honourable The Lord Lamington GCMG GCIE FRSGS
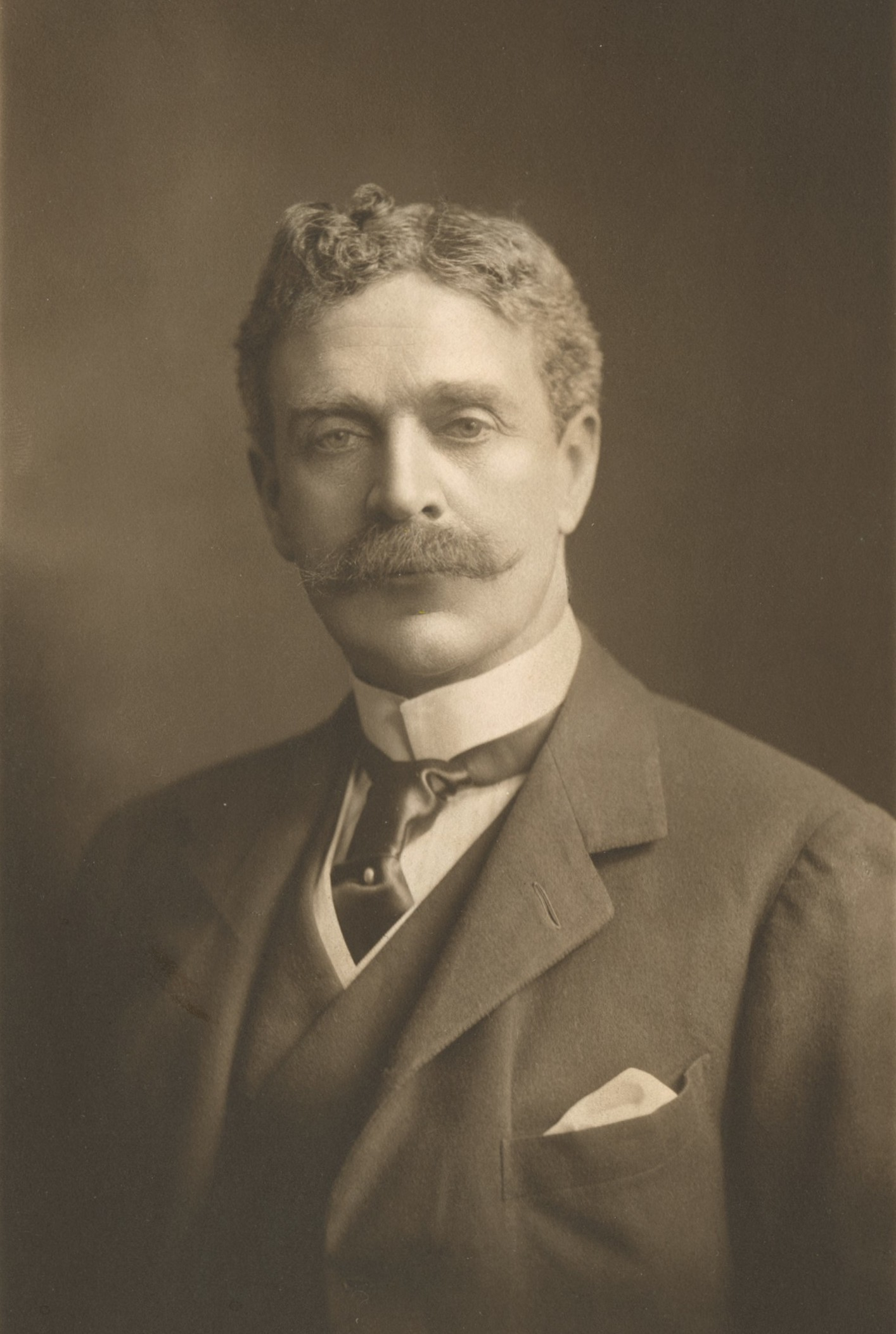

14th Governor of Bombay
- In office 12 December 1903 – 27 July 1907
- Monarch: Edward VII
- Preceded by: The Lord Northcote
- Succeeded by: John Muir-Mackenzie

8th Governor of Queensland
- In office 9 April 1896 – 19 December 1901
- Monarchs: Victoria; Edward VII
- Premier: Hugh Nelson; Thomas Joseph Byrnes; James Dickson; Anderson Dawson; Robert Philp
- Preceded by: Henry Wylie Norman
- Succeeded by: Herbert Chermside

Member of Parliament for St Pancras North
- In office July 1886 – 1890
- Preceded by: Thomas Henry Bolton
- Succeeded by: Thomas Henry Bolton

Personal details
- Born: Charles Wallace Alexander Napier Cochrane-Baillie; 31 July 1860 London, Middlesex, England
- Died: 16 September 1940 (aged 80) Lamington, Lanarkshire, Scotland
- Party: Conservative
- Other political affiliations: Conservative and Liberal Unionist
- Spouse: Mary Houghton Hozier (m. 1895)
- Children: 2
- Parent: 1st Baron Lamington (father)
- Education: Eton College
- Alma mater: Christ Church, Oxford

Charles Wallace Alexander Napier Cochrane-Baillie, 2nd Baron Lamington, GCMG, GCIE, FRSGS (29 July 1860 – 16 September 1940), was a British politician and colonial administrator who served as Governor of Queensland from 1896 to 1901, and Governor of Bombay from 1903 to 1907.

== Early life ==
Born in London, England, he was the only son of Alexander Baillie-Cochrane, 1st Baron Lamington. Charles was educated at Eton College and Christ Church, Oxford, where he graduated with a Bachelor of Arts in 1883. In 1885, he became assistant private secretary to the prime minister of the United Kingdom, Lord Salisbury.

== Political career ==
Cochrane-Baillie was narrowly defeated in the 1885 election for the borough constituency of St Pancras North, but he won the subsequent election in July 1886, taking his seat in the British House of Commons for the Conservative Party.

Upon the death of his father in 1890, he succeeded as the 2nd Baron Lamington.

On 13 June 1895, he married Mary Houghton Hozier at St Michael's Church, Pimlico; they had two children, a son and a daughter.

In 1890, the British government sent Lord Lamington to travel between Tonkin in Vietnam and Siam, with a view to annexing at least the Xishuangbanna district and possibly the whole Yunnan province of China in an attempt to limit French colonisation of the area. (Note: Lord Lamington read a paper on his visit to the Shan States on the Siam border. The paper dealt with his journey from Chieng Mai, in the Laos country, to Mung Phoong, in the Sibsong Pana ... A railway to the plain of Chieng Sen was, on Mr. Holt Hallett's showing, sure to be constructed some day, and then the prolongation of it into the rich district of the Sibsong Pana and Yunnan would rest in the hands of the British.)

== Governorships ==
Cochrane-Baillie was in the Royal Company of Archers, as King's body guard for Scotland. In October 1895, Lamington was selected to replace Sir Henry Norman as Governor of Queensland. His tenure as Governor was from 9 April 1896 to 19 December 1901. He was a very politically conservative governor, and expressed a concern that the Federation of Australia which took place during his tenure would lead to unrestrained socialism. He also worked with the first Premier of Queensland, Sir Samuel Griffith, to ensure that the role of state governors was not diminished after Federation.

Apart from six months leave in England when he was appointed a Knight Grand Cross of the Order of St Michael and St George, Lamington served as governor for five years until 19 December 1901. In 1903 he was made a Knight Grand Commander of the Order of the Indian Empire, and appointed as Governor of Bombay (until his resignation in July 1907), where the royal prerogative he exercised was far more powerful than it had been in Australia. He is also noted as being sympathetic, after having met 'Abdu’l-Bahá, to the Baháʼí Faith.

== Later life ==
Lamington was appointed captain of the Lanarkshire Yeomanry on 26 March 1902.

In spring 1919, he served as Commissioner of the British Relief Unit in Syria, prior to its allocation as a French mandate.

On 13 March 1940, he was one of four victims of a shooting at the Caxton Hall in London by Indian nationalist Udham Singh. Former lieutenant-governor of India, Michael O'Dwyer was killed instantly. O'Dwyer's predecessor in the role, Louis Dane, suffered a broken arm. Cochrane-Baillie and Lawrence Dundas, the former secretary of state for India, were slightly injured.

Lamington died at his family home, Lamington House, in Lanarkshire, Scotland, on 16 September 1940, aged 80.

== Other roles and ranks (undated) ==
- President of the East India Association
- President of the National Indian Association
- President of the Middle East Association
- President of the Indigent Moslems Burial Fund
- President of the British Red Crescent Society
- President of 'other organisations concerned with Eastern welfare and culture'
- President of the Persia Society (forerunner of the Iran Society) (--1912--)
- Vice President of the Royal Central Asian Society
- Vice-President of the Royal Geographical Society of London
- Chairman of the Committee of the Royal Normal College and Academy of Music for the Blind (--1913--)
- A Vice-President of the Trinity College of Music, London (--1913--)
- Lieutenant-Colonel of the 6th Battalion, The Scottish Rifles (Cameronians)
- Captain of the Royal Company of Archers (King's Bodyguard for Scotland)
- Lieutenant-Colonel of the Lanarkshire Yeomanry

== Personal life ==
Lord Lamington married Mary Houghton Hozier, the youngest daughter of William Hozier, 1st Baron Newlands, on 13 June 1895. They had two children, a son Victor Alexander Brisbane William Cochrane-Baillie (1896–1951, godson of Queen Victoria and in 1940 became the 3rd Baron Lamington) and a daughter Grisell Annabella Gem Cochrane-Baillie (1898–1985).

Lady Lamington's diary, her 'little pamphlet of memories', held by the State Library of Queensland, paints a detailed portrait of their life as public figures in the colonies.

== Legacy ==
Lord Lamington is best known in Australia for allegedly giving his name to the lamington, a popular Australian cake consisting of a cube of sponge cake dipped in a thin chocolate icing and rolled in desiccated coconut. The stories of the creation of the lamington vary widely, although in most versions Lamington's chef Armand Galland at Queensland's Government House devises the cake either by accident or due to a shortage of ingredients. Lamington is also reported to have referred to the cakes as "those bloody poofy woolly biscuits".

In May 2009, Australia Post commemorated Lord and Lady Lamington on a postage stamp as part of a series celebrating Australian deserts.

The Lamington Plateau and National Park in Queensland, Lamington Bridge in Maryborough, Queensland, Mount Lamington (a volcano in Papua New Guinea), and Lamington Road in Mumbai Lamington High School in Hubli were also named after him.

The Lady Lamington Hospital for Women and Lady Lamington Nurses Home are now part of Royal Brisbane Hospital Nurses' Homes.

Parliament of the United Kingdom
Preceded by Thomas Henry Bolton	Member of Parliament for St Pancras North; 1886–1890	Succeeded by Thomas Henry Bolton
Government offices
Preceded by Sir Henry Norman	Governor of Queensland; 1896–1901	Succeeded by Sir Herbert Chermside
Preceded by The Lord Northcote	Governor of Bombay; 1903–1907	Succeeded by Sir George Clarke
Peerage of the United Kingdom
Preceded by Alexander Baillie-Cochrane	Baron Lamington; 1890–1940	Succeeded by Victor Cochrane-Baillie
