= Ian Fraser, Baron Fraser of Lonsdale =

British Conservative Party politician

The Right Honourable The Lord Fraser of Lonsdale CH CBE

Member of the House of Lords Lord Temporal
- In office 1 August 1958 – 19 December 1974; Life Peerage

Member of Parliament for Morecambe & Lonsdale
- In office 24 February 1950 – 1 August 1958
- Preceded by: Office created
- Succeeded by: Basil de Ferranti

Member of Parliament for Lonsdale
- In office 13 April 1940 – 3 February 1950
- Preceded by: Lord Balniel
- Succeeded by: Office abolished

Personal details
- Born: 30 August 1897
- Died: 19 December 1974 (aged 77)
- Party: Conservative
- Education: Royal Military Academy Sandhurst

William Jocelyn Ian Fraser, Baron Fraser of Lonsdale, CH, CBE (30 August 1897 – 19 December 1974) was a British Conservative Party politician, a Governor of the BBC, a successful businessman and the first person to be awarded a life peerage under the Life Peerages Act 1958.

Fraser was blinded in World War I and became Chairman of St Dunstan's, a charity for blind servicemen.

== Early life and war injury ==
Fraser was the son of William Percy Fraser, a businessman of South Africa, who played a role in the development of Johannesburg. He was born in Eastbourne, England but spent his early years in South Africa. He returned to England and was educated at St Cyprian's School Eastbourne and Marlborough College. He went to the Royal Military College, Sandhurst, at the start of World War I and in the spring of 1916, he was sent out to join the army in France where he was a captain in the King's Shropshire Light Infantry. At the Battle of the Somme on 23 July 1916, a German bullet blinded him. He was sent back to England to the Officers Ward of the London General Hospital and when the bandages were finally removed it was found that he had lost the sight of both his eyes.

Sir Arthur Pearson, the chairman of St Dunstan's (now Blind Veterans UK), the independent charity for blind servicemen and women, wrote Fraser a letter explaining how he had gone blind in middle life and how he had made the best of it. Pearson told how he had established St Dunstan's to train war-blinded men and invited Fraser to go there. The letter was delivered to Fraser by Irene "Chips" Mace whom he later married. He accepted the invitation and when Sir Arthur Pearson died after an accident in his bathroom, Fraser, aged twenty-four, was chosen to succeed him as chairman, a position he held for 52 years. He wrote his autobiography "Whereas I was Blind" at the beginning of World War II as encouragement in anticipation of soldiers being blinded once again.

== Political life and BBC ==
Fraser became Member of Parliament (MP) for St. Pancras North by a narrow majority at the 1924 general election. After losing the seat in the 1929 general election, he regained it in 1931. In 1934, he received a knighthood in recognition of the effort that he had put into developing St Dunstans, and two years later he was appointed a Governor of the BBC. Being on the committee of the BBC, he was no longer allowed to remain a Member of Parliament and resigned his seat. However, in 1940, an Act of Parliament was introduced which allowed certain people to be members of parliament and to hold office in the BBC in the public interest during the war. Fraser was elected for Lonsdale in 1940, and held the seat until 1958.

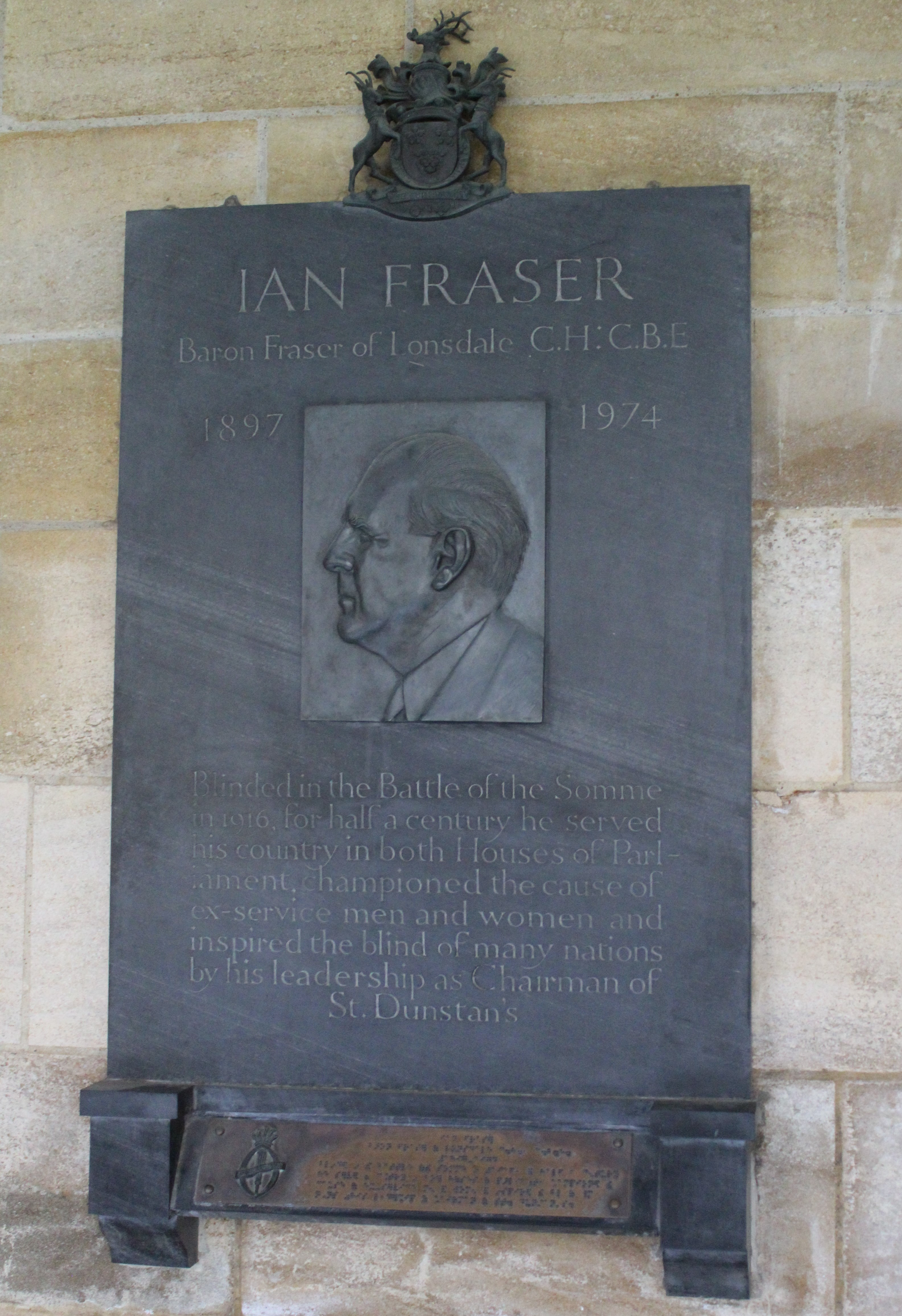
Fraser's memorial, Westminster Abbey

== Business activity ==
Fraser also held many positions on the Boards of other companies. From 1936, he had been on the advisory council of the company Frasers Limited, which had been set up by two uncles trading in Southern Africa. This advisory council was made up of members of the Frasers family, living in England, to whom the Board of Frasers had to report from time to time. He was elected to the Board of Frasers Ltd in 1954 and became chairman after the sudden death of Douglas Fraser in 1956. He would spend two to three months every year at Fraser House in Wepener.

== Honours and personal ==
Fraser was appointed a Commander of the Order of the British Empire (CBE) in 1923, knighted in 1934, he was appointed a Member of the Order of the Companions of Honour in 1953 and in 1958 became the first life peer created under the Life Peerages Act 1958 which had been introduced by Harold Macmillan. He took the title of Baron Fraser of Lonsdale, of Regent's Park in the County of London on 1 August 1958. He died in Marylebone aged 77. Lady Fraser died in 1978.

Lord Redcliffe-Maud said at the service of Thanksgiving held in Westminster Abbey on Tuesday 4 February 1975.

"I will lift up mine eyes unto the hills. Therefore, indeed we would if we have eyes to lift. However, the achievement of Ian Fraser's life can be summed up like this; he lifted up the loss of his eyes, in bounden duty and service, day by day for nearly 60 years of his 77 years of life. That living sacrifice was accepted and made creative of great good. It has put new heart into tens of thousands of the sightless (and the sighted) that came within its influence, and nothing will stop the good work now. It would never be the same as if Lord Fraser had not lived and learnt the mystery of the road of Suffering".

Lord Fraser has a memorial in the west cloister of Westminster Abbey.

Fraser married Irene Mace (or "Chips" as he called her), the woman who had delivered Pearson's letter, and who he said at the time wore the smoothest and most beautiful kid gloves that he had ever felt. He dedicated the book he wrote in 1961 to her, saying that she had more influence over the affairs of St Dunstans that any other woman, possibly more than any other person.

Coat of arms of Ian Fraser, Baron Fraser of Lonsdale
| Crest A stag's head erased Gold gorged with an antique crown Gules in the mouth a red corn poppy slipped and leaved Proper. Escutcheon Azure in chief two fraises and in base a lion's face Argent. Supporters On either side a springbok Proper gorged with an antique crown Gules and charged on the shoulder with a torch enflamed of the last. Motto Je Suis Prest (I Am Ready) |

== Publications ==
- Whereas I was Blind:Autobiography Hodder 1942
- My Story of St Dunstan's Harrap 1961

Parliament of the United Kingdom
| Preceded by James Marley | Member of Parliament for St. Pancras North; 1924 – 1929 | Succeeded by James Marley |
| Preceded by James Marley | Member of Parliament for St. Pancras North; 1931 – 1937 | Succeeded by Robert Grant-Ferris |
| Preceded by Lord Balniel | Member of Parliament for Lonsdale; 1940 – 1950 | Constituency abolished |
| New constituency | Member of Parliament for Morecambe and Lonsdale; 1950 – 1958 | Succeeded by Basil de Ferranti |
Honorary titles
| New title | Senior life peer 1958–1974 | Succeeded by The Lord Geddes of Epsom |
