= Jock Stallard =

British politician (1921–2008)

The Right Honourable The Lord Stallard
- Jock Stallard

Member of Parliament for St Pancras North
- In office 18 June 1970 – 13 May 1983
- Preceded by: Kenneth Robinson
- Succeeded by: Constituency abolished

Member of the House of Lords
- Lord Temporal
- Life peerage 7 September 1983 – 29 March 2008

Personal details
- Born: Albert William Stallard; 5 November 1921 Hamilton, Scotland
- Died: 29 March 2008 (aged 86) London, England
- Party: Labour
- Spouse: Julia (Sheila) Murphy (m. 1944; died 2004)
- Children: 2
- Education: Hamilton Academy

Albert William "Jock" Stallard, Baron Stallard (5 November 1921 – 29 March 2008) was a British Labour politician. He served as a councillor in St Pancras and Camden, and then as a Member of Parliament (MP). He retired from the House of Commons at the 1983 general election and became a life peer in the 1983 Dissolution Honours.

== Early life ==
Stallard was born in Hamilton, Lanarkshire, the son of Frederick Stallard, a postman and driver from Tottenham. His family had moved to Scotland before his birth, and he retained the nickname "Jock" in later life. He was educated at Low Waters Public School, winning a place to continue his education at Hamilton Academy. His family returned to London in 1937, and he left school aged 16 to become an apprentice in precision engineering. He was a socialist, becoming a shop steward for the Amalgamated Union of Engineering Workers. He found himself working in a reserved occupation during the Second World War.

He was elected to St Pancras Council in 1953. Along with other councillors from St Pancras led by John Lawrence, he was expelled from the Labour Party for flying the red flag from the town hall on May Day 1958, in protest at the exacerbation of endemic Rachmanism by the relaxation of rent controls under the Rent Acts in the post-war years. He left the council in 1959, but rejoined the party and became an alderman in 1962. He served as a member of Camden London Borough Council from its formation in 1964 as the successor to St Pancras Council until he became an MP in 1970.

== Parliamentary career ==
Stallard was Member of Parliament for St Pancras North from 1970 until the constituency was abolished in boundary changes at the 1983 general election. In both the February 1974 and October 1974 general elections, his Conservative Party opponent was future Prime Minister John Major, who was making his debut as a parliamentary candidate.

When the Labour party returned to government in 1974, Stallard became a Parliamentary Private Secretary (PPS) to Edward Bishop, Minister of State at the Ministry of Agriculture, Fisheries and Food, and, from October, PPS to Reg Freeson, minister of housing and construction in the Department of the Environment. He became a government whip in early 1976, when James Callaghan replaced Harold Wilson. The whips were essential at that period, with a minority government only able to pass legislation thanks to the Lib–Lab pact. Stallard was promoted to become a Lord Commissioner of the Treasury in 1978, but resigned in January 1979 when the Prime Minister, Callaghan, promoted a Bill which would increase the representation of Northern Ireland in the House of Commons from 12 seats to 17.

After being passed over for selection for a re-drawn seat of Holborn and St Pancras in the 1983 general election in favour of Frank Dobson, the younger Labour candidate from Holborn and St Pancras South, the other half of the merged constituency, Stallard was appointed to the House of Lords. He was created a life peer as Baron Stallard, of St Pancras in the London Borough of Camden, on 7 September 1983.

In the House of Lords, he opposed compulsory sex education in schools, the 1990 Embryology bill and along with many peers of his generation, felt homophobia was not just acceptable but enshrined in the teachings of his religion. A devout Roman Catholic, during debates in the Lords on the equalisation of the age of consent in 2000, he compared homosexuality to child abuse and attacked the Blair government for threatening to impose the will of the House of Commons on the Lords by way of the Parliament Acts 1911 and 1949: "[T]he one thing I cannot come to terms with is the concept that homosexuality must be equated with heterosexuality and that homosexual couples must be equated with married couples."

== Personal life and death ==
Stallard married Julia (Sheila) Murphy in 1944, in St Pancras, London. His wife was Irish, originally from County Kerry, and the couple had a son, Richard, in 1945 and a daughter, Brenda, in 1949. He was a self-taught pianist, enjoyed jazz music and performed at sing-songs in several Camden pubs.

Stallard attended the House of Lords everyday until his wife's death in 2004. Following a long illness, Stallard died in a nursing home in north London on 29 March 2008, aged 86. A Requiem Mass was held in Our Lady of Hal Catholic Church in Camden Town, north London, attended by Members of the House of Lords, MPs, representatives from local government, including Lord Tony Clark who gave the first reading, and Lord Graham of Edmonton and Roger Robinson who read tributes at the end of the Mass.

== Notes ==
Parliament of the United Kingdom
Preceded by Kenneth Robinson	Member of Parliament for St Pancras North; 1970–1983	Constituency abolished
