= John Gilbert Dale =

John Gilbert Dale (1869 – 6 March 1926) was a British scientist who also became a prominent trade union and political activist.

Born in Hanley, Staffordshire, Dales studied at Victoria College in Congleton. Developing a research interest in epilepsy, he also became a fellow of the Royal Geographical Society and a fellow of the Zoological Society of London.

Dale became active in the Labour Party and stood for Kennington at the 1910 London County Council election, receiving 900 votes, and again in 1913, when he managed only 7.9% of the vote. He also stood for Parliament in St Pancras North at the 1918 United Kingdom general election, taking 26.6% of the votes cast. He stood again in the 1922 United Kingdom general election, when he improved to 33.6% and second place.

A supporter of the British police strikes in 1918 and 1919, Dale was a founder of the National Union of Police and Prison Officers (NUPPO), but this was soon banned by the government. Dale instead devoted his time to the Prison Officers' Federation, a surviving, legal, affiliate of NUPPO, serving as its president.

Dale remained politically active, contesting Walthamstow East at the 1923 and 1924 United Kingdom general elections, taking just over a third of the vote and second place on each occasion.
