= Robert Grant-Ferris, Baron Harvington =

British Conservative Party politician

Baron Harvington AE PC

Deputy Speaker of the House of Commons Chairman of Ways and Means
- In office 2 July 1970 – 28 February 1974
- Speaker: Horace King; Selwyn Lloyd
- Preceded by: Sydney Irving
- Succeeded by: George Thomas

Member of Parliament for Nantwich
- In office 26 May 1955 – 28 February 1974
- Preceded by: Constituency created
- Succeeded by: John Cockcroft

Member of Parliament for St Pancras North
- In office 4 February 1937 – 26 July 1945
- Preceded by: Ian Fraser
- Succeeded by: George House

Personal details
- Born: Robert Grant Ferris; 30 December 1907
- Died: 1 January 1997 (aged 89)
- Party: Conservative
- Spouse: Florence Brennan de Vine
- Children: 2
- Parent: Ellen Ryan Ferris (mother)
- Education: Douai School

Military service
- Branch/service: RAF
- Awards: Air Efficiency Award

Robert Grant Grant-Ferris, Baron Harvington, AE PC (30 December 1907 – 1 January 1997) was a British Conservative Party politician and RAF officer.

== Early life and career ==
Born Robert Grant Ferris, he was the son of Mrs Ellen Ryan Ferris (1870–1955), who is known to have purchased and given Harvington Hall to the Archdiocese of Birmingham in 1923. Grant-Ferris was a staunch supporter of fellow devout Roman Catholic Francisco Franco during the Spanish Civil War.

He was educated at Douai School and served in the RAF during the War, receiving the Air Efficiency Award in 1942.

He changed his name from Ferris to Grant-Ferris by deed poll in August 1942.

== Political career ==
He was member of parliament (MP) for St Pancras North from 1937 to 1945, and for Nantwich from 1955 until his retirement at the February 1974 general election. He served as Chairman of Ways and Means and Deputy Speaker from 1970 to 1974. Ferris's maiden speech to Parliament was in March 1937, in a debate on the Air Ministry estimates, in which he spoke as a member of the Royal Auxiliary Air Force.

Robert Grant-Ferris was knighted in 1969, and sworn to the Privy Council in 1971. On 24 June 1974 he was given a life peerage as Baron Harvington, of Nantwich in Cheshire.

== Personal life ==
In 1930, he married Florence Brennan de Vine (died 30 December 1996), with whom he had a daughter and a son.

His son Fr Piers Grant-Ferris (b. 9 April 1933) pleaded guilty at Leeds Crown Court to indecently assaulting 15 boys while teaching at Gilling Castle, North Yorkshire, the preparatory school for nearby Ampleforth College, between 1966 and 1975.

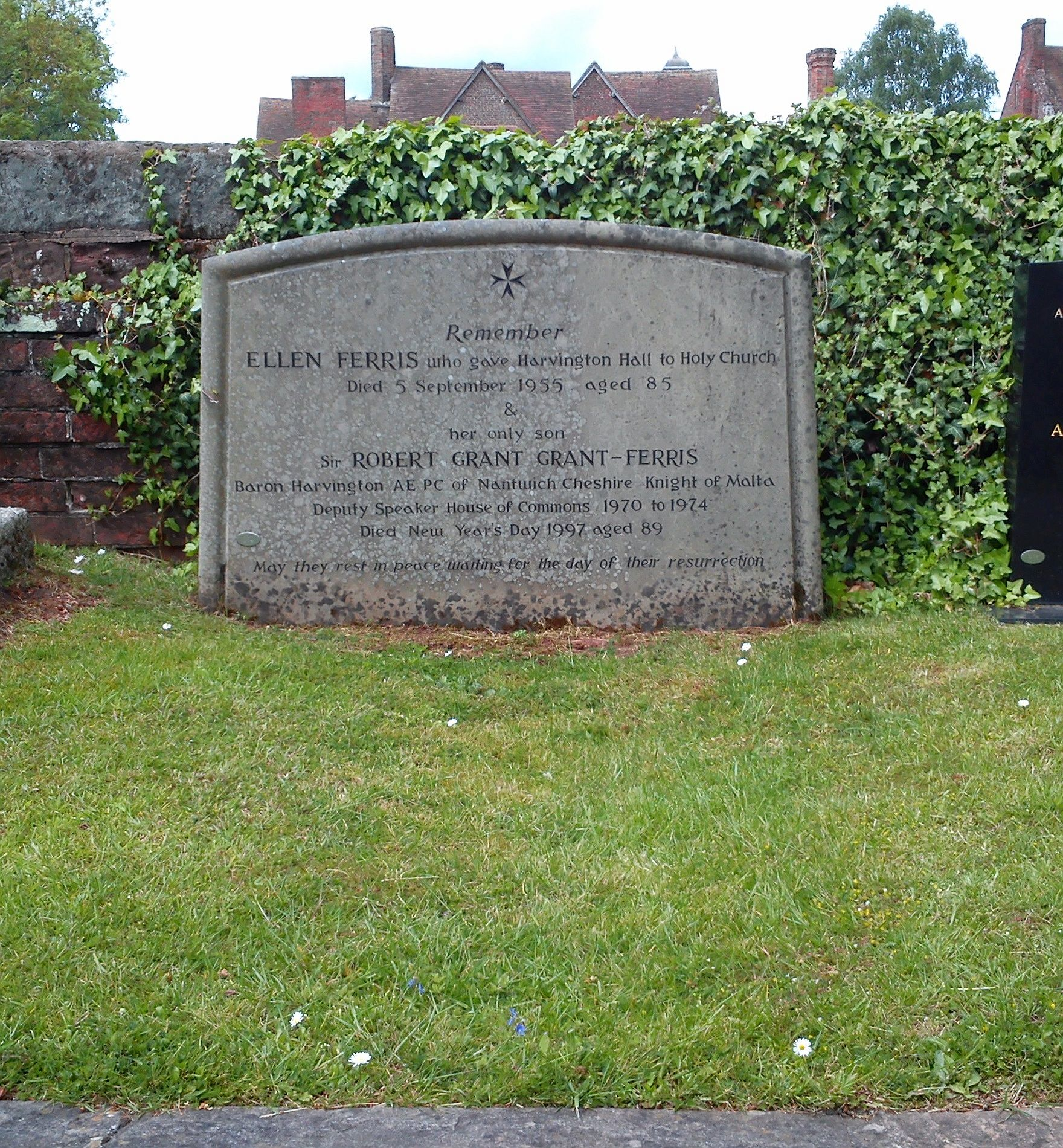
Harvington near Chaddesley Corbett: St Mary's Catholic Church, grave of Lord Harvington and his mother in the churchyard. The roof of Harvington Hall is visible in the background.

He died on New Years Day 1997, two days after the death of his wife Florence on his 89th birthday.

Coat of arms of Robert Grant-Ferris, Baron Harvington
Crest A Comb fesswise Argent between two Hazel Branches fruited proper Escutcheon Gules three Antique Crowns Or within an Orle of eight Horseshoes Argent Supporters Dexter: a Knight Grand Cross of Magistral Grace of the Sovereign and Military Order of Malta in Choir Dress proper; Sinister: a representation of a Pilot of the Royal Air Force in Service Dress circa 1942 also proper about his neck a Scarf Gules spotted Argent Motto I Never Give Up

Parliament of the United Kingdom
Preceded by Ian Fraser	Member of Parliament for St Pancras North; 1937–1945	Succeeded by George House
New constituency	Member of Parliament for Nantwich; 1955–February 1974	Succeeded by John Cockcroft
