= St Pancras North (UK Parliament constituency) =

Parliamentary constituency in the United Kingdom, 1885–1983

- Former borough constituency for the House of Commons
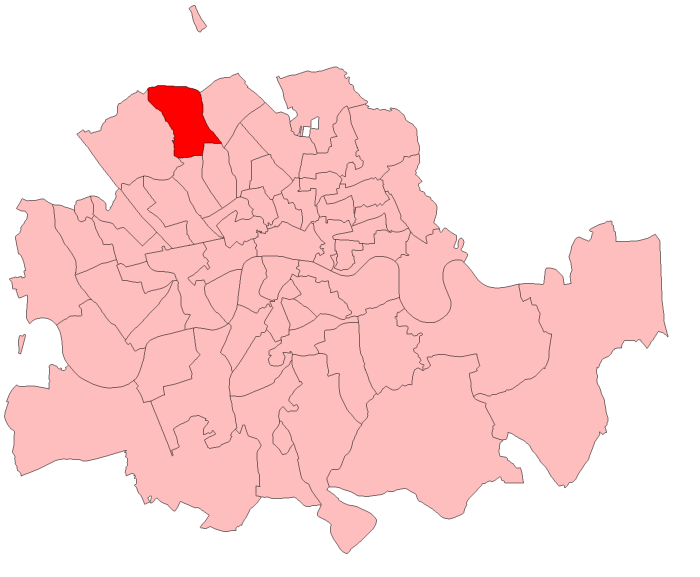
- St Pancras North in London 1885–1918

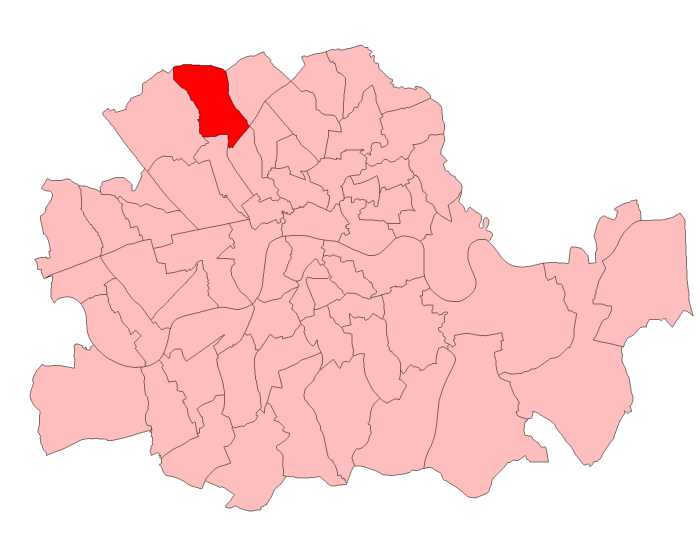
- St Pancras North in London 1918–1950

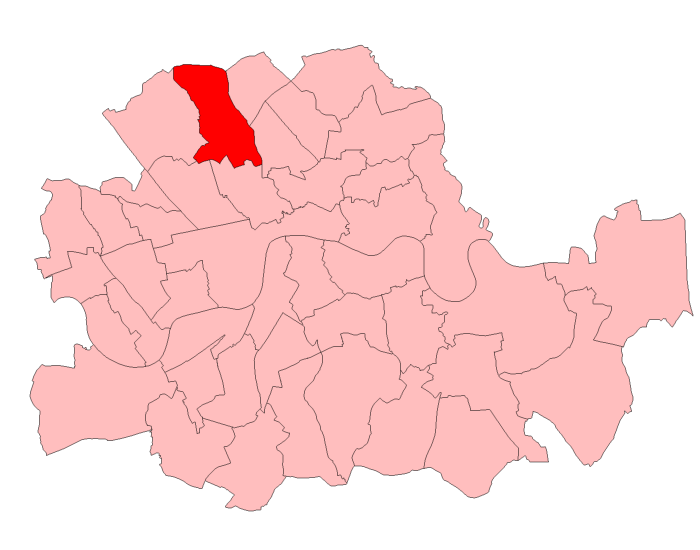
- St Pancras North in London 1950–1974
- County: County of London

1885–1983
- Seats: One
- Created from: Marylebone
- Replaced by: Holborn & St Pancras and Hampstead & Highgate

St. Pancras North was a borough constituency represented in the House of Commons of the Parliament of the United Kingdom. It elected one Member of Parliament (MP) by the first-past-the-post system of election. It was created in 1885 and abolished in 1983 with the area becoming part of the new constituency of Holborn and St Pancras.

== Boundaries ==
A map showing the wards of St Pancras Metropolitan Borough as they appeared in 1916.

1918–1950: The Metropolitan Borough of St Pancras wards of one and two, and the part of ward number three lying to the north and west of a line running along the middle of Camden Road from a point where that road is intersected by the eastern boundary of the metropolitan borough to the point where that road crosses the Regent's Canal and thence westward along the middle of that canal to the western boundary of Ward number three.

1950–1974: The Metropolitan Borough of St Pancras wards of one, two, three and four.

1974–1983: The London Borough of Camden wards of Camden, Chalk Farm, Gospel Oak, Grafton, Highgate, and St John's.

== Members of Parliament ==
Election	Member	Party	Notes
1885	Thomas Henry Bolton	Liberal	
1886	Charles Cochrane-Baillie	Conservative	later Baron Lamington
1890 by-election	Thomas Henry Bolton	Liberal	Bolton was re-elected in 1892 as a Liberal, but later joined the Liberal Unionists
1893?	Thomas Henry Bolton	Liberal Unionist Party	Bolton was re-elected in 1892 as a Liberal, but later joined the Liberal Unionists
1895	Edward Robert Pacy Moon	Conservative	
1906	Willoughby Dickinson	Liberal	later 1st Baron Dickinson
1918	John Lorden	Coalition Conservative	
1922	John Lorden	Conservative	
1923	James Marley	Labour	
1924	Ian Fraser	Conservative Party	
1929	James Marley	Labour	
1931	Ian Fraser	Conservative Party	later Baron Fraser of Lonsdale
1937 by-election	Robert Grant-Ferris	Conservative Party	later Baron Harvington
1945	George House	Labour	
1949 by-election	Kenneth Robinson	Labour	Minister of Health 1964–1968
1970	Albert Stallard	Labour	
1983	constituency abolished: see Holborn & St Pancras		

== Election results ==
=== Elections in the 1880s ===
General election 1885: St Pancras North
Party	Candidate	Votes	%	±%
Liberal	Thomas Henry Bolton	2,380	55.4	
Conservative	Charles Cochrane-Baillie	1,915	44.6	
Majority		465	10.8	
Turnout		4,295	78.8	
Registered electors		5,450		
Liberal win (new seat)				

General election 1886: St Pancras North
Party	Candidate	Votes	%	±%
Conservative	Charles Cochrane-Baillie	2,074	53.4	+8.8
Liberal	Thomas Henry Bolton	1,813	46.6	−8.8
Majority		261	6.8	N/A
Turnout		3,887	71.3	−7.5
Registered electors		5,450		
Conservative gain from Liberal		Swing	+8.8	

=== Elections in the 1890s ===
Cochrane-Baillie was elevated to the peerage as Lord Lamington.

By-election 1890: St Pancras North
Party	Candidate	Votes	%	±%
Liberal	Thomas Henry Bolton	2,657	50.7	+4.1
Conservative	Henry Robert Graham	2,549	48.7	−4.7
Independent	John Leighton	29	0.6	New
Majority		108	2.0	N/A
Turnout		5,235	82.7	+11.4
Registered electors		6,332		
Liberal gain from Conservative		Swing	+4.4	

General election 1892: St Pancras North
Party	Candidate	Votes	%	±%
Liberal	Thomas Henry Bolton	2,643	50.2	+3.6
Conservative	Edward Robert Pacy Moon	2,583	49.1	−4.3
Independent	John Leighton	35	0.7	N/A
Majority		60	1.1	N/A
Turnout		5,261	77.6	+6.3
Registered electors		6,784		
Liberal gain from Conservative		Swing	+4.0	

General election 1895: St Pancras North
Party	Candidate	Votes	%	±%
Conservative	Edward Robert Pacy Moon	2,834	51.7	+2.6
Liberal	Herbert Raphael	2,623	47.8	−2.4
Independent	John Leighton	29	0.5	−0.2
Majority		211	3.9	N/A
Turnout		5,486	75.6	−2.0
Registered electors		7,256		
Conservative gain from Liberal		Swing	+2.5	

=== Elections in the 1900s ===
General election 1900: St Pancras North
Party	Candidate	Votes	%	±%
Conservative	Edward Robert Pacy Moon	3,056	56.6	+4.9
Liberal	Willoughby Dickinson	2,345	43.4	−4.4
Majority		711	13.2	+9.3
Turnout		5,401	71.2	−4.4
Registered electors		7,582		
Conservative hold		Swing	+4.7	

W.H. Dickinson

General election 1906: St Pancras North
Party	Candidate	Votes	%	±%
Liberal	Willoughby Dickinson	4,094	60.8	+17.4
Conservative	Edward Robert Pacy Moon	2,643	39.2	−17.4
Majority		1,451	21.6	N/A
Turnout		6,737	84.0	+12.8
Registered electors		8,021		
Liberal gain from Conservative		Swing	+17.4	

=== Elections in the 1910s ===
General election January 1910: St Pancras North
Party	Candidate	Votes	%	±%
Liberal	Willoughby Dickinson	4,970	58.0	−2.8
Conservative	Hercules Pakenham	3,603	42.0	+2.8
Majority		1,367	16.0	−5.6
Turnout		8,573	85.9	+1.9
Registered electors		9,977		
Liberal hold		Swing	−2.8	

General election December 1910: St Pancras North
Party	Candidate	Votes	%	±%
Liberal	Willoughby Dickinson	4,407	57.7	−0.3
Conservative	Arthur Moon	3,230	42.3	+0.3
Majority		1,177	15.4	−0.6
Turnout		7,637	76.5	−9.4
Registered electors		9,977		
Liberal hold		Swing	-0.3	

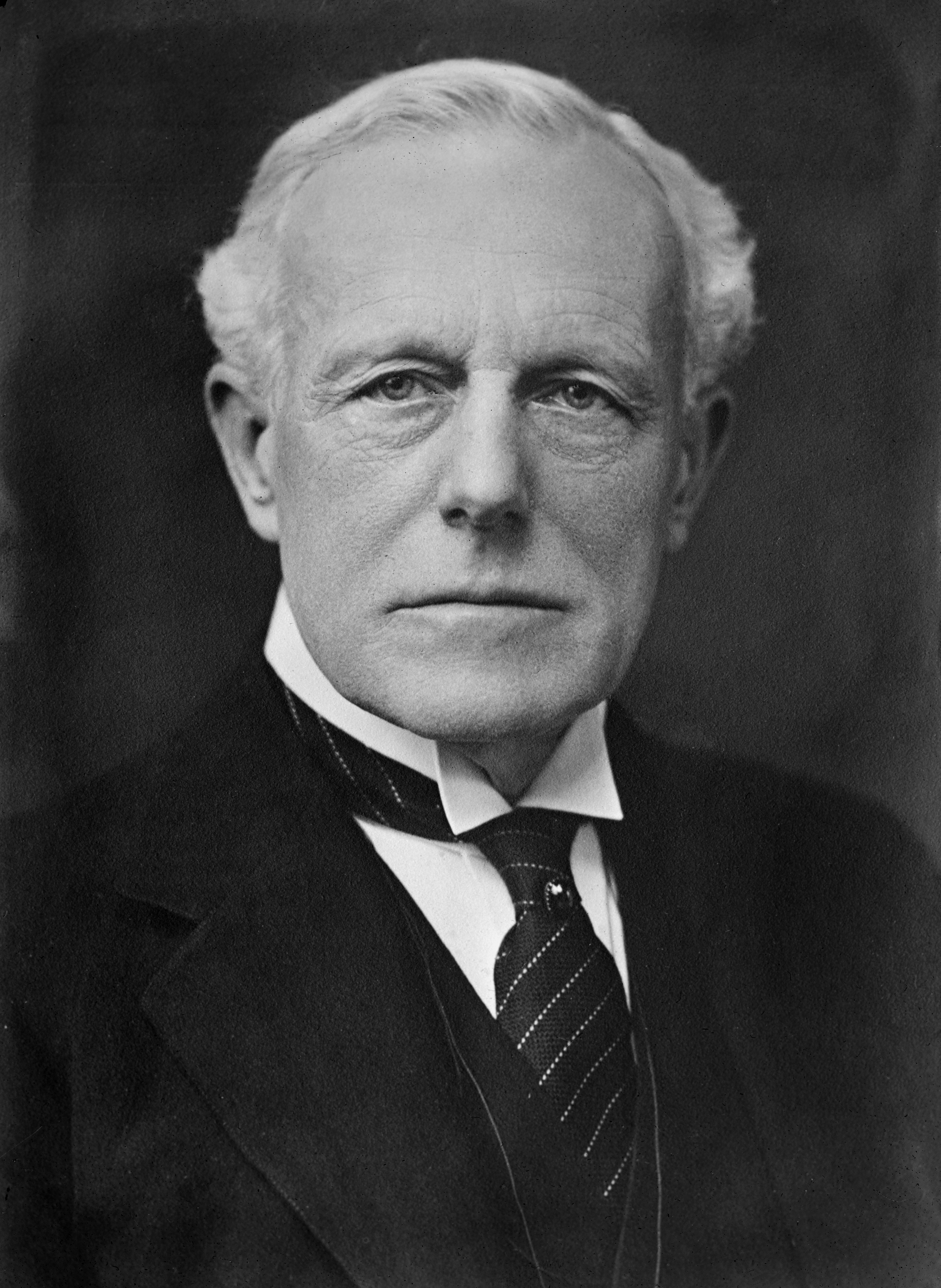
W.H. Dickinson

General election 1918: St Pancras North
Party		Candidate	Votes	%	±%
C	Unionist	John Lorden	7,260	41.4	−0.9
	Liberal	Willoughby Dickinson	5,596	32.0	−25.7
	Labour	John Gilbert Dale	4,651	26.6	New
Majority			1,664	9.4	N/A
Turnout			17,507	51.9	−24.6
	Unionist gain from Liberal		Swing	+12.4	
C indicates candidate endorsed by the coalition government.

=== Elections in the 1920s ===
General election 1922: St Pancras North
Party	Candidate	Votes	%	±%
Unionist	John Lorden	9,156	37.7	−3.7
Labour	John Gilbert Dale	8,165	33.6	+7.0
Liberal	Willoughby Dickinson	6,979	28.7	−3.3
Majority		991	4.1	−5.3
Turnout		24,300	66.0	+14.1
Unionist hold		Swing		

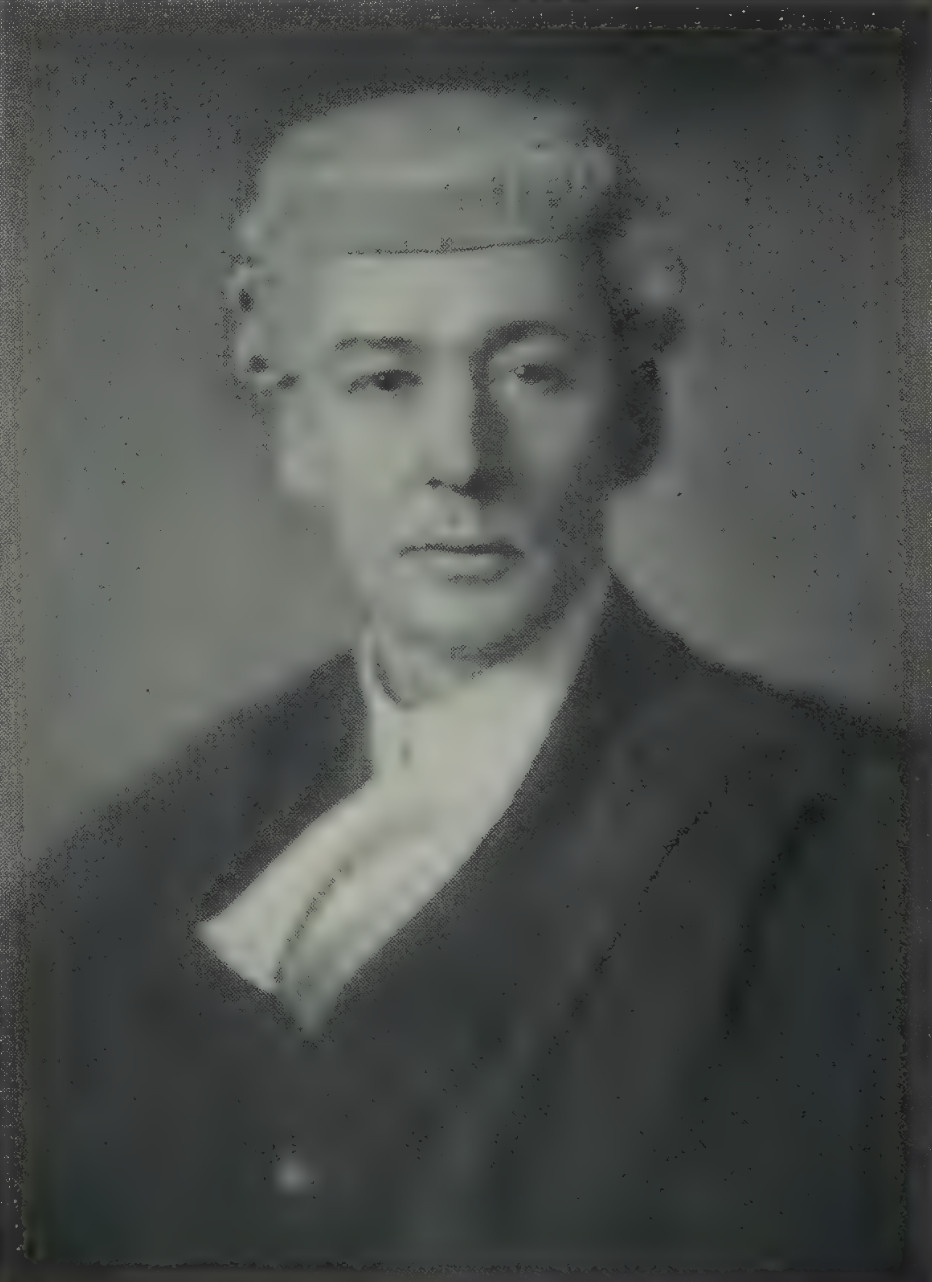
Henry Roome

General election 1923: St Pancras North
Party	Candidate	Votes	%	±%
Labour	James Marley	10,931	43.0	+9.4
Unionist	John Lorden	8,085	31.9	−5.8
Liberal	Henry Delacombe Roome	6,363	25.1	−3.6
Majority		2,846	11.1	N/A
Turnout		25,379	68.2	+2.2
Labour gain from Unionist		Swing	+7.6	

General election 1924: St Pancras North
Party	Candidate	Votes	%	±%
Unionist	Ian Fraser	13,964	46.7	+14.8
Labour	James Marley	13,171	44.1	+1.1
Liberal	Henry Delacombe Roome	2,748	9.2	−15.9
Majority		793	2.6	N/A
Turnout		29,883	79.2	+11.0
Unionist gain from Labour		Swing		

General election 1929: St Pancras North
Party	Candidate	Votes	%	±%
Labour	James Marley	17,458	48.5	+4.4
Unionist	Ian Fraser	14,343	39.9	−6.8
Liberal	Frederick L. Coysh	4,177	11.6	+2.4
Majority		3,115	8.6	N/A
Turnout		35,978	76.0	−3.2
Labour gain from Unionist		Swing	+5.6	

=== Elections in the 1930s ===
General election 1931: St Pancras North
Party	Candidate	Votes	%	±%
Conservative	Ian Fraser	22,490	63.9	+24.0
Labour	James Marley	12,257	34.8	−13.7
Communist	W G Shepherd	456	1.3	New
Majority		10,233	29.1	N/A
Turnout		35,203	73.4	−2.6
Conservative gain from Labour		Swing		

General election 1935: St Pancras North
Party	Candidate	Votes	%	±%
Conservative	Ian Fraser	16,888	53.7	−10.2
Labour	Henry Montague Tibbles	13,287	42.3	+7.5
Liberal	William Otterburn Hall	1,259	4.0	New
Majority		3,601	11.4	−17.7
Turnout		31,434	68.3	−5.1
Conservative hold		Swing		

By-election 1937: St Pancras North
Party	Candidate	Votes	%	±%
Conservative	Robert Grant-Ferris	11,744	50.6	−3.1
Labour	Henry Montague Tibbles	11,476	49.4	+7.1
Majority		268	1.2	−10.2
Turnout		23,220	50.9	−13.4
Conservative hold		Swing		

=== Elections in the 1940s ===
General election 1945: St Pancras North
Party	Candidate	Votes	%	±%
Labour	George House	16,738	63.8	+21.5
Conservative	Robert Grant-Ferris	9,108	34.7	−19.0
Independent	John B. Gilmour	403	1.5	New
Majority		7,630	29.1	N/A
Turnout		26,249	71.0	+2.7
Labour gain from Conservative		Swing		

By-election 1949: St Pancras North
Party	Candidate	Votes	%	±%
Labour	Kenneth Robinson	16,185	57.5	−6.3
Conservative	Neil Shields	11,118	39.5	+4.8
Communist	John Mahon	854	3.0	New
Majority		5,067	18.0	−11.1
Turnout		28,157	65.1	−5.9
Labour hold		Swing		

=== Elections in the 1950s ===
General election 1950: St Pancras North
Party	Candidate	Votes	%	±%
Labour	Kenneth Robinson	29,163	55.75	
Conservative	John Harvey	19,028	36.38	
Liberal	Peter Maurice Charles Whitton	3,148	6.02	New
Communist	Tom Ahern	967	1.85	
Majority		10,135	19.37	
Turnout		52,306	79.64	
Labour hold		Swing		

General election 1951: St Pancras North
Party	Candidate	Votes	%	±%
Labour	Kenneth Robinson	31,191	60.50	
Conservative	Charles A. B. Borrett	20,362	39.50	
Majority		10,829	21.00	
Turnout		51,553	78.30	
Labour hold		Swing		

General election 1955: St Pancras North
Party	Candidate	Votes	%	±%
Labour	Kenneth Robinson	24,670	56.63	
Conservative	Anthony Royle	17,588	40.38	
Communist	John Nicolson	1,303	2.99	New
Majority		7,082	16.25	
Turnout		43,561	69.43	
Labour hold		Swing		

General election 1959: St Pancras North
Party	Candidate	Votes	%	±%
Labour	Kenneth Robinson	22,256	54.12	
Conservative	David Mitchell	15,949	38.79	
National Labour	William Webster	1,685	4.10	New
Communist	John Nicolson	1,230	2.99	
Majority		6,307	15.33	
Turnout		41,120	69.47	
Labour hold		Swing		

=== Elections in the 1960s ===
General election 1964: St Pancras North
Party	Candidate	Votes	%	±%
Labour	Kenneth Robinson	20,516	61.04	
Conservative	Kenneth Warren	11,954	35.57	
Communist	John Nicolson	1,140	3.39	
Majority		8,562	25.47	
Turnout		33,610		
Labour hold		Swing		

General election 1966: St Pancras North
Party	Candidate	Votes	%	±%
Labour	Kenneth Robinson	20,951	64.18	
Conservative	James Moorhouse	10,440	31.98	
Communist	John Nicolson	1,253	3.84	
Majority		10,511	32.20	
Turnout		32,644		
Labour hold		Swing		

=== Elections in the 1970s ===
General election 1970: St Pancras North
Party	Candidate	Votes	%	±%
Labour	Albert Stallard	16,497	59.31	
Conservative	James Moorhouse	10,648	38.28	
Communist	Gordon McLennan	670	2.41	
Majority		5,849	21.03	
Turnout		27,815	62.21	
Labour hold		Swing		

General election February 1974: St Pancras North
Party	Candidate	Votes	%	±%
Labour	Albert Stallard	14,761	52.76	
Conservative	John Major	7,926	28.33	
Liberal	Paul J Medlicott	4,825	17.25	New
Communist	Gordon McLennan	466	1.67	
Majority		6,835	24.43	
Turnout		27,978	67.53	
Labour hold		Swing		

General election October 1974: St Pancras North
Party	Candidate	Votes	%	±%
Labour	Albert Stallard	14,155	58.53	
Conservative	John Major	6,602	27.30	
Liberal	Paul J Medlicott	3,428	14.17	
Majority		7,553	31.23	
Turnout		24,185	58.10	
Labour hold		Swing	+3.4	

General election 1979: St Pancras North
Party	Candidate	Votes	%	±%
Labour	Albert Stallard	14,556	54.23	
Conservative	Peter Kirwan	9,110	33.94	
Liberal	Malcolm Valentine	2,654	9.89	
National Front	Stephen Andrews	360	1.34	New
Workers Revolutionary	Granville Jones	159	0.59	New
Majority		5,446	20.29	
Turnout		26,839	63.74	
Labour hold		Swing		
