= Edward Moon (MP) =

British barrister and Conservative MP

Edward Robert Pacy Moon (1858 – 11 September 1949) was a British barrister and Conservative MP for St Pancras North.

He won the seat from the Liberals in 1895, held it in 1900, but lost it back to them in the 1906 landslide.

He was educated at Winchester College and Oxford University, and qualified as a barrister.

He married Frideswide, daughter of Sir Arthur Kekewich.

== Sources ==
- Craig, F.W.S. British Parliamentary Election Results 1885-1918
- Whitaker's Almanack, 1896 to 1910 editions
- Leigh Rayment's Historical List of MPs^{[usurped]}
