= John Lorden =

Sir John William Lorden JP was Conservative MP for St Pancras North.

He won the seat from the Liberals in 1918, held it in 1922, but lost it to Labour in 1923.

He was previously a member of the London County Council for Wandsworth, from 1910 to 1913, for the Municipal Reform Party.

== Sources ==
- Craig, FWS, ed. (1974). British Parliamentary Election Results: 1885–1918 London: Macmillan Press. p. 42. ISBN 9781349022984.
- Whitaker's Almanack, 1919 to 1924 editions
