= Grille Incident =

Grill Incident Suffrage Protest at the Palace of Westminster

- Part of British Women's Suffrage Movement
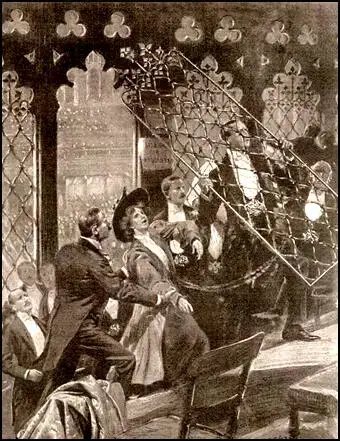
- Illustration of the Grille Incident, London Illustrated News
- Date: 28 October 1908
- Location: Ladies Gallery, House of Commons, Palace of Westminster
- Also known as: The Disorder in the Galleries
- Target: British Members of Parliament
- Organised by: Women's Freedom League
- Participants: Muriel Matters, Helen Fox, Violet Tillard, and others
- Property damage: Gallery Grille Removed
- Arrests: 15 (14 women, 1 man)
- Charges: Public disorder
- Sentence: Fines and/or Imprisonment at Holloway Prison
- Hansard report: Official Hansard Report
- Website: UK Parliament Site

The Grille Incident was a non-violent British Women's Suffrage Movement protest event that took place on Wednesday 28 October 1908 in the Ladies' Gallery of the British Parliament's House of Commons at the Palace of Westminster. The protest was organised and orchestrated by members of the Women's Freedom League and was accompanied by concurrent protests by Women's Freedom League members outside the parliament's Saint Stephens entrance.

== Background ==
On the evening of 28 October 1908, several members of the Women's Freedom League entered the parliament, with the assistance of Member of Parliament Stephen Collins and made their way to the Ladies' gallery of the House of Commons.

During debate of the Licensing Bill 1908 by Member of Parliament, James Remnant, proceedings were interrupted when, as the official Hansard record shows, his speech became inaudible ...on account of a disturbance in the Ladies' Gallery, where two ladies had chained themselves to the grille, with women attempting to address the House in support of their campaign for Women's suffrage.

Two women Muriel Matters and Helen Fox, chained themselves to the grille and commenced shouting slogans including "Votes for Women" and "Why don't you do justice to the unemployed!". At the same time, another woman Violet Tillard lowered a suffragette proclamation banner down the side of the gallery balcony into the House, while others threw handbills (or pamphlets) onto the floor of the chamber and onto members.

The debate was halted, and the House was adjourned. At the same time, the Serjeant at Arms and House Attendants, with the assistance of the Metropolitan Police, attempted to remove the protestors. Attendants had found it impossible to remove the chains that were holding Matters and Fox to the grille, and the grille's bolts had to be unscrewed. The entire grille was removed before Matters and Fox could be led away from the gallery to committee room 15, with one report suggesting Matters. Fox each had a big section of the grille, several feet in length, still attached to the women.

The House then resumed business, with the Speaker, James Lowther addressing the House saying, "the decencies of the House having been violated and the privileges granted by this House having been grossly abused", and that he 'reluctantly' ordered both the Strangers' Gallery and Ladies' Gallery closed until further notice and Matters, Fox, Tillard and others were arrested by the Metropolitan Police and taken to the Westminster Police station.

== Accompanied campaigns ==
On the same evening as the Grille Incident, outside the Parliament's Saint Stephen's Entrance, the Women's Freedom League members conducted simultaneous protests with the purpose of raising further public attention to the struggle of women.

== Perpetrators and aftermath ==
As part of the Grille Incident and accompanying protests outside the Parliament, fourteen members of the Women's Freedom League were arrested:

In addition to the women, one man, Arnold Cutler, was also arrested outside the parliament after he was reported by the Metropolitan Police for acting in a threatening attitude by removing his belt, standing in the middle of the road and shouting "shame!" and "Let (sic) the ladies alone!" at police.

The women and Cutler appeared before the Westminster Police Court on 29 October 1909 (the day after the incident), where they were each sentenced to a range of penalties, which ranged from fines to imprisonment. These sentences were:

1. Muriel Matters, Fined £5 (Not paid, chose imprisonment)
2. Margeurite Henderson, Fined £5 (Not paid, chose imprisonment)
3. Alison Neilans
4. Marion Leighfield, Fined £5 (Paid)
5. Dorothy Maloney, Fined £5
6. Dorothy Spencer, Fined £5
7. Violet Tillard, Fined £5 (Not paid, chose imprisonment)
8. Edith Bremmer, Fined £5 (Not paid, chose imprisonment)
9. Emily Duval, Fined £5 (Paid)
10. Barbara Duval, Released without penalty
11. Belinda Wells, Fined £5 (Not paid, chose imprisonment)
12. Mary Manning, Fined £5 (Not paid, chose imprisonment)
13. Miriam Holmes, Fined £5 (Not paid, chose imprisonment)
14. Janet MacCullum, Fined £5 (Not paid, chose imprisonment)
15. Arnold Cutler, Fined £20 (Paid)

Alison Neilans entered a counter charge of assault against a constable. Neiland was remanded on bail to appear before the courts at a later date, whilst the other women who chose not to pay their fines were committed to a month's imprisonment, and were immediately transported to Holloway Prison in a Black Maria police van, with the exception of Holmes, who was granted the ability to make her own way to the prison on the grounds of ill health.

Emily Duval was arrested, together with her teenage daughter Barbara. Emily paid her fine, and her 17-year-old daughter, Barbara, was released without penalty, on the condition that she would not participate in any further protests until she met the age of majority, which was 21 at the time.

== Legacy ==
In 1935, the Grille Protest was dramatised in the British black and white film 'Royal Cavalcade'. The drama is a pastiche of notable events from the previous twenty-five years that was commissioned to commemorate the Silver Jubilee of King George V.

Muriel's 1939 BBC Interview
Matters discusses her life and the women's franchise campaign

In 1939, Muriel Matters gave a rare interview to BBC Radio, which contained a detailed account of her suffrage efforts, including the Grille Incident.

In 2008, as part of the Grille Incident centenary celebrations and given incident participant, Muriel Matters was an Australian born suffragist, South Australia, local member of parliament, Frances Bedford MP arranged for one of the original Ladies' Gallery Grilles to be loaned to the Parliament of South Australia, where is hangs in the lobby or the parliament.

In 2011, the United Nations Educational, Scientific and Cultural Organisation placed the proclamation banner lowered into the House by Tillard, along with other suffrage items, onto the UNESCO World Heritage Register.

The Grille Incident story was a prominent feature during the United Kingdom's 2017 celebration of 100 years of women achieving the vote.

Although not noted in the official Hansard record of proceedings in the House of Commons, Matters' pronouncements were, technically, the first speech by a woman in the British Parliament.

== See also ==
- Women's suffrage in the United Kingdom
- Women's Freedom League
- Muriel Matters
- Violet Tillard
