= Balloon Raid =

Women's suffrage protest in London in 1909

- Part of British Women's Suffrage Movement
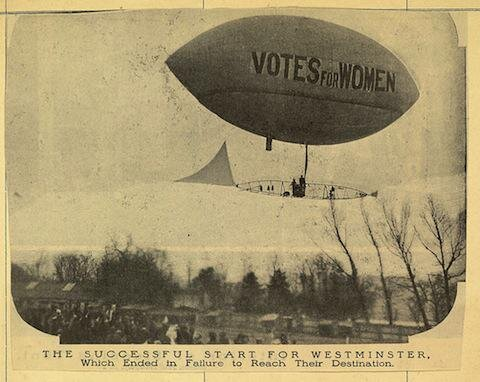
- Photograph of the Balloon Over London (1909)
- Date: 16 February 1909
- Location: Cricklewood, London (Start); Croydon, Surrey (End)
- Also known as: Balloon Incident; Airship Flight; Balloon Raid on Parliament
- Target: King Edward VII; State Opening of Parliament; Members of Parliament
- Organised by: Women's Freedom League
- Participants: Muriel Matters; Percival G. Spencer (Captain); Other WFL Members
- Website: Muriel Matters Society

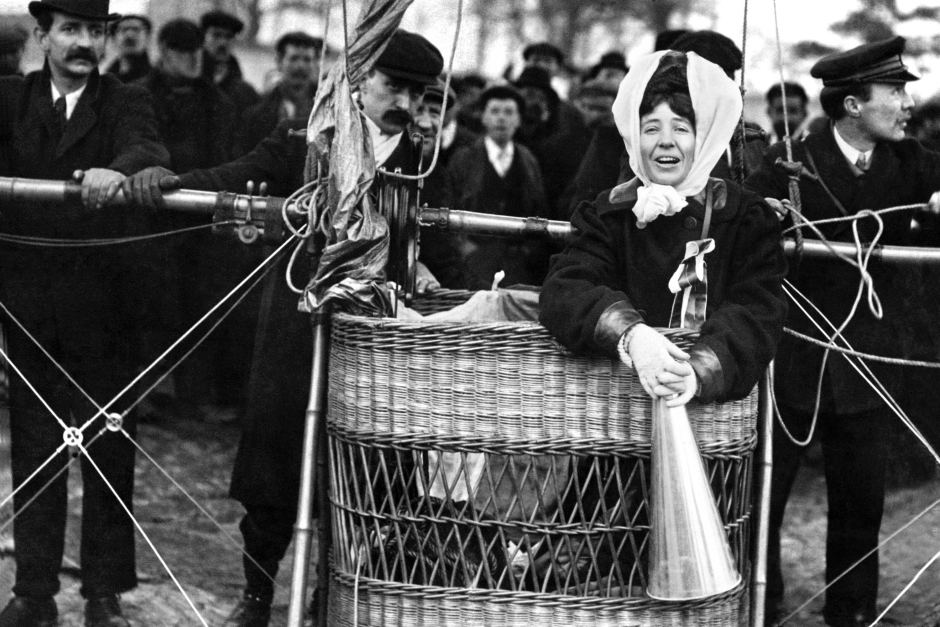
Muriel Matters in the didigible

The Balloon Raid was a non-violent British Women's Suffrage Movement protest event that took place over the skies of London on Tuesday 16 February 1909 during King Edward VII's royal procession from Buckingham Palace to the Palace of Westminster for the official State Opening of Parliament.

== Background ==
The protest sought to follow the royal procession of King Edward and his wife Alexandra of Denmark from their home at Buckingham Palace to the Houses of Parliament in the afternoon of Tuesday 16 February 1909, designed to gain attention and to promote the Women's Suffrage movement in the United Kingdom. Chief organiser, Muriel Matters and the Women's Freedom League decided to hire a small dirigible (airship) designed, built and owned by Spencer Family, with the intent to shower the King, bystanders on the route of the procession and the Houses of Parliament with Women's Freedom League Handbills (also known as pamphlets). In a 1957 television interview with the BBC, Matters explained why she had decided to undertake the protest via the air, saying:

We had applied for permission to distribute our leaflets along the route of the King's procession, and that permit was refused, so that we had to have recourse to some other technique.

The Women's Freedom League chartered, from Captain Spencer, an airship upon which he had been working with a small dirigible, and this enabled me to take up 100 weight or more of leaflets which were distributed along the route of the King's procession.

— Muriel Matters, BBC 'First Hand' (14 May 1957)

The balloon was captained by one of two disputed Spencer brothers, Percival or Herbert, using their Type 3 Balloon, with the flight plan to takeoff from Hendon Fields in North London, and make its way to the area over the Palace and the Parliament. However, the adverse weather and wind conditions, coupled with the rudimentary motor powering that the airship was equipped with meant the planned flight path route was doomed to fail, with the flight making its way over the London skies and while close to the Parliament, Matters and Spencer did not quite made complete the planned route, instead hugging the outskirts of Central London.

The balloon took off from Hendon Fields at about 2:10pm, with one photo showing a significant crowd was assembled to see the historic takeoff. Photographs, newspaper reports and first-hand recollections recall the balloon being emblazoned on one side with the words 'Votes for Women' and the other side with the words 'Women's Freedom League'. The balloon tookoff and rose to a height of about 3,500 feet (1,100 m) (or 915 meters).

Matters had taken on board a 'hundredweight', representing about 112 pounds (51 kg) of Handbills promoting the Women's Freedom League and the suffrage cause, and scattered them over London during the flight. Members of the Women's Freedom League, including Edith How-Martyn and Elsie Craig, were reported to have followed Matters and the balloon across London in their car. The balloon finally landed at about 4pm in shrubland adjacent to farming land in the small town of Coulsdon, just outside of Croydon in Surrey.

Matters, Spencer and their balloon campaign made headlines across the world and are regularly featured in historic ballooning and aviation literature to this day, including by Richard Branson in his 2010 Autobiography.

=== Route ===
The Balloon flew over London, down to Surrey, over the course of a few hours, with newspaper reports at the time indicating the balloon flew over a range of outer London suburbs, including:

- Hendon Fields (Start, 2:15pm)
- Brondesbury
- Wormwood Scrubs
- Shepherd's Bush
- Kensington
- Westminster
- Victoria
- Tooting
- Streatham
- Croydon
- Coulsdon (End, 4pm)

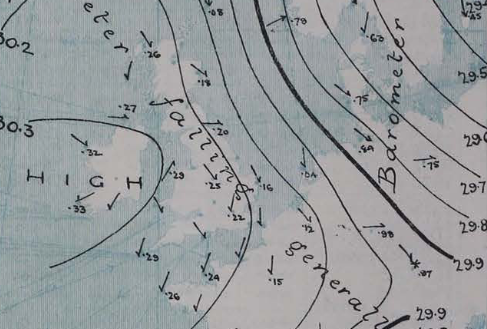
London Weather Map at 7am on 16 February 1909

The balloon's target was the Palace of Westminster, and whilst the balloon flew close, it missed its target due to adverse conditions, particularly high winds at the time.

== Muriel Matters and the Women's Freedom League ==
=== Muriel Matters ===
Muriel's 1939 BBC Interview
Matters discusses her life and the women's franchise campaign on BBC Radio Times programme 'Scrapbook for 1909' (7 February 1939)

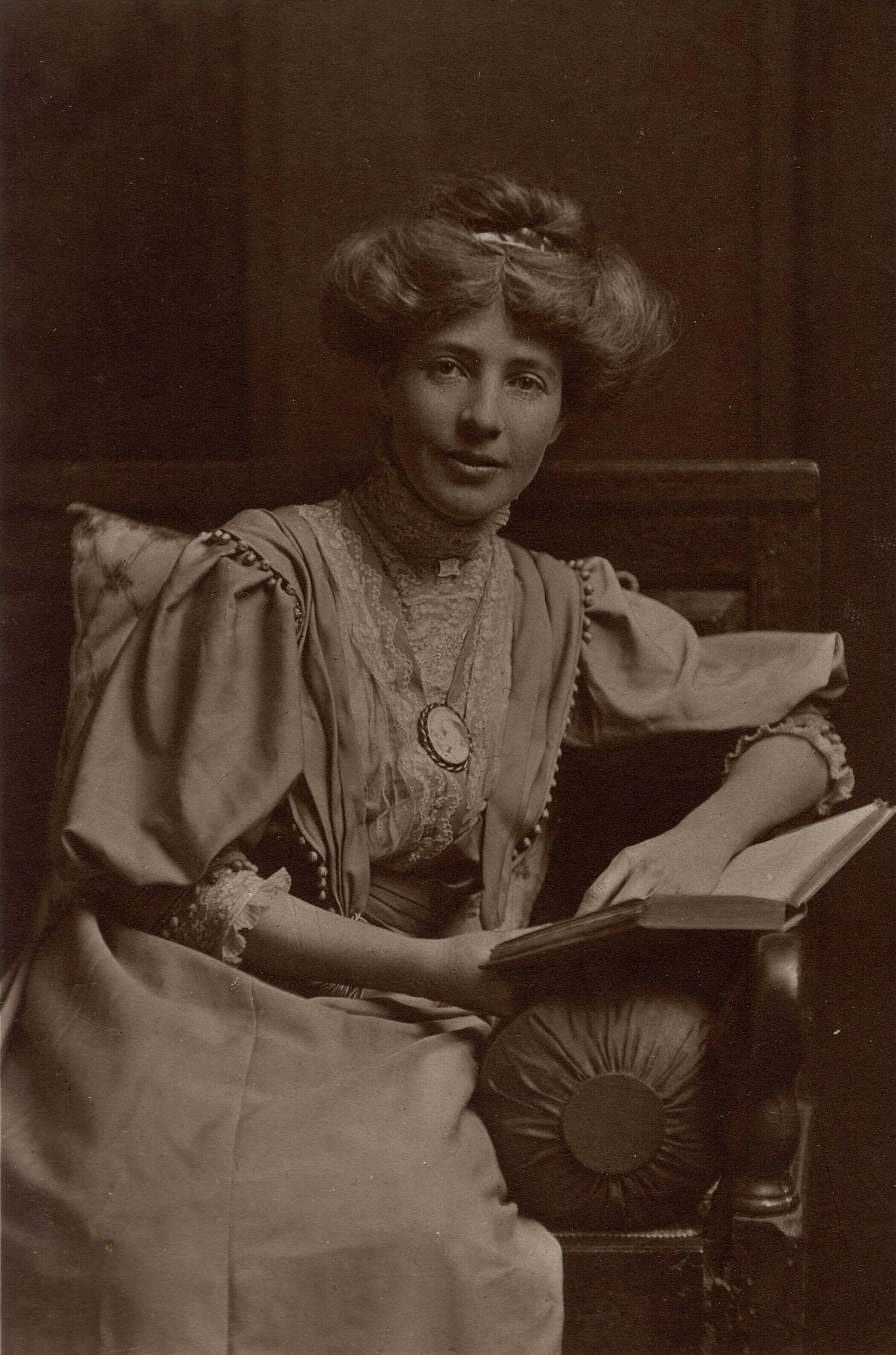
Muriel Matters in 1910

The Balloon Raid's principal participant was Australian-born suffragist Muriel Matters. Matters is best known for her work on behalf of the Women's Freedom League at the height of the militant struggle to enfranchise women in the United Kingdom.

In 1939, in a rare interview with the BBC, Matters recounted the events of the Balloon Raid, saying:

I went to Hendon and met Mr Henry Spencer, who had his airship already near the Welsh heart. It was quite a little airship, 80 feet long and written in large letters on the guest bed were three words ‘Votes for Women’. Below this was suspended and extremely fragile rigging or framework carrying the engine and the basket, like those used for a balloon.

We loaded up about a hundredweight of leaflets. Then I climbed into the basket. Mr Spencer joined me, and we rose into the air, travelling towards Cricklewood.

We ascended to over 3000 feet. It was very cold, but I got some exercise throwing the leaflets overboard. Mr Spencer occasionally clambered out along the framework to make some adjustment. He was rather like a spider walking across its web for the rigging was quite open, with nothing between him and the earth, and suddenly, I realised that if he fell off, I hadn't the first idea how to manoeuvre the airship. Not that I bothered much about that. I was far too busy making a trail of leaflets across London.

But sad to say, we were blown off our course. We missed the Houses of Parliament, but we landed at Croydon in Surrey, near the top branches of a tree. However, the flight achieved all we wanted. It got our movement a great deal of publicity, as you can imagine.

For in those days, the sight of an airship was enough to make people run for miles.

— Muriel Matters, BBC Interview (1939)

=== Women's Freedom League ===
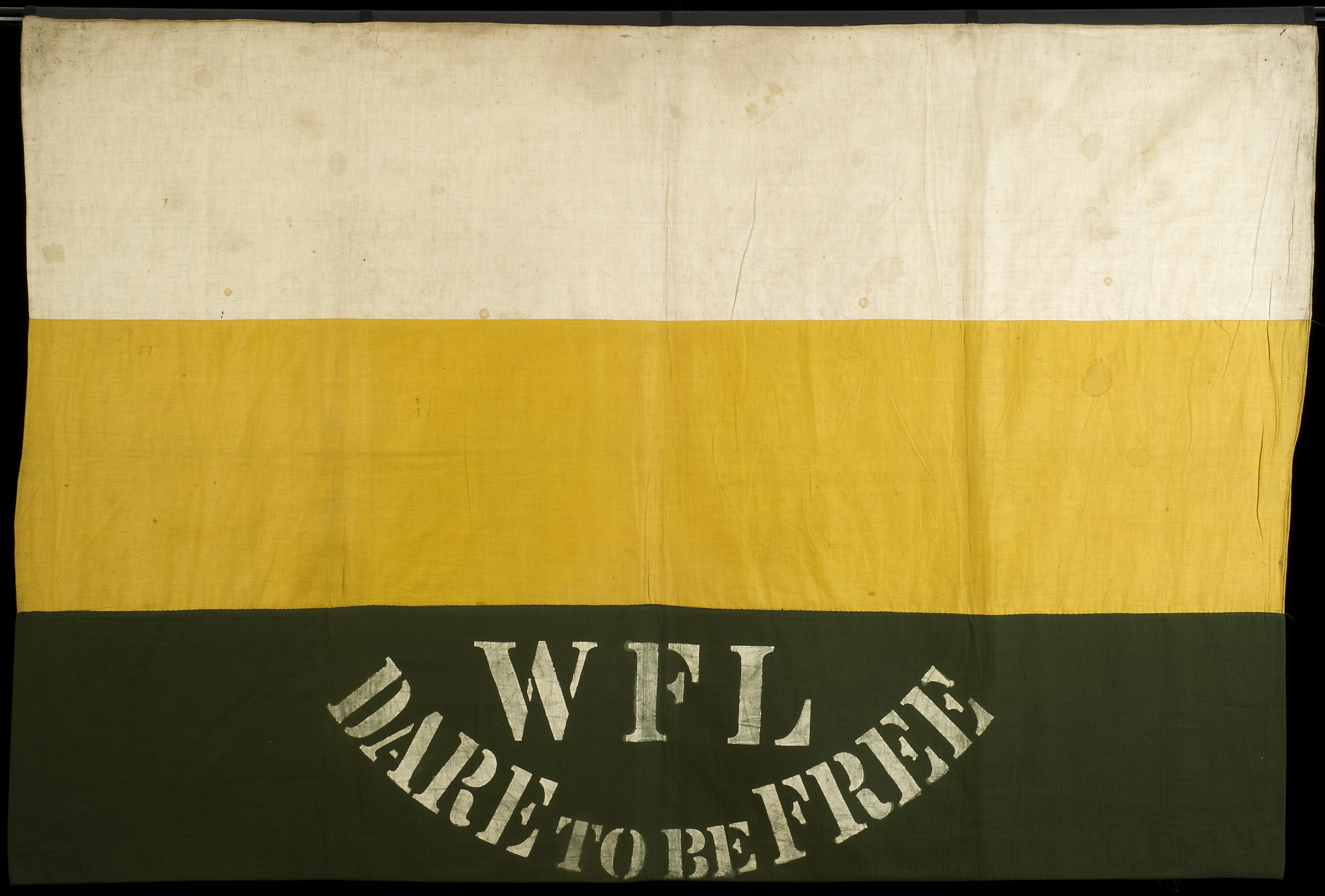
Women's Freedom League Banner

The Women's Freedom League was an organisation in the United Kingdom from 1907 to 1961 which campaigned for women's suffrage, pacifism and sexual equality. It was founded by former members of the Women's Social and Political Union after the Pankhursts decided to rule without democratic support from their members.

The Women's Freedom League had successfully facilitated a number of protest events prior to the Balloon Raid, including the Grille Incident which took place in October 1908, again with Muriel Matters as one of the principal organisers and participants.

== Airship and Mr Spencer ==
There are conflicting reports on whether the Captain of the Balloon Raid's airship was Percival G. Spencer or his brother Herbert Spencer, both from the famous Spencer Family who were designers of early airships from their family factory in London's outer suburb of Highbury.

Regardless of whether the ship was captained by Percival or Herbert, the family and their airship played a crucial role in the success of the protest.

== Legacy ==
Muriel's 1939 BBC Interview
Matters discusses her life and the women's franchise campaign

In 1939, Muriel Matters gave a rare interview to BBC Radio, which contained a detailed account of her suffrage efforts, including the Grille Incident.

In 1949, the Balloon Raid was parodied and dramatised in the British black and white film Kind Hearts and Coronets. This clip shows the scene where ‘Louis’ is looking out of his flat window and then uses a bow and arrow to shoot down the balloon from which the suffragette, Lady Agatha D’Ascoyne is dropping leaflets over London. This is the only known dramatisation of Muriel's Balloon Raid.

In 2010, Sir Richard Branson mentions Muriel Matters' efforts in the Balloon Raid in his book Reach for the Skies: Ballooning, Birdmen and Blasting into Space.

== See also ==
- Women's suffrage in the United Kingdom
- Women's Freedom League
- Muriel Matters
- Percival G. Spencer
- Spencer Airships
