= Muriel Matters =

Australian-born suffragist, lecturer, journalist, educator, actress and elocutionist

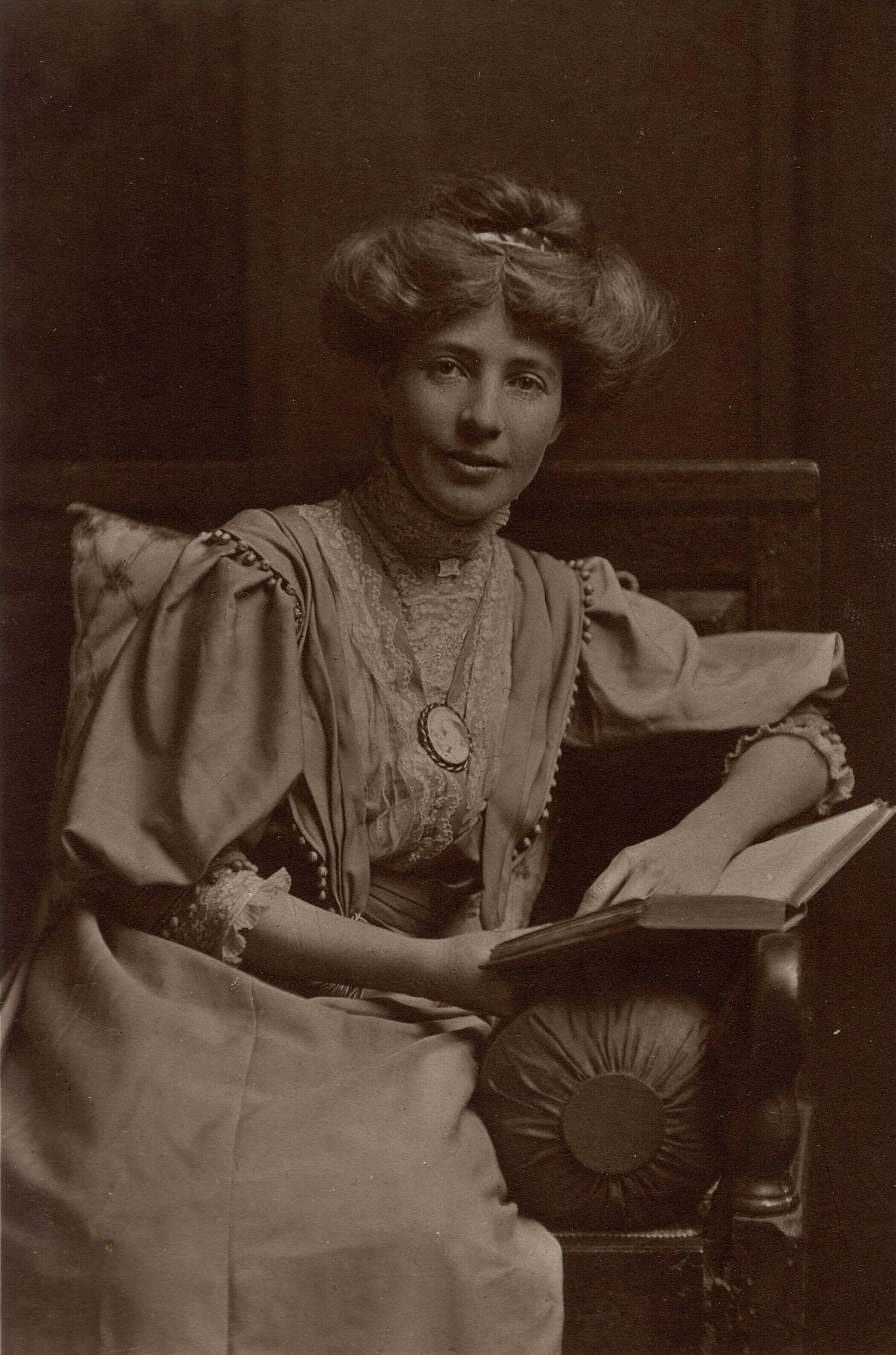
- Muriel Matters c. 1910
- Born: Muriel Lilah Matters; 12 November 1877; Bowden, Province of South Australia
- Died: 17 November 1969 (aged 92); Hastings, East Sussex, United Kingdom
- Burial place: Hastings Cemetery
- Other names: Muriel Porter; Muriel Matters-Porter; Muriel Mathers
- Citizenship: Australia, British Subject; United States (from 1915)
- Education: University of Adelaide
- Occupations: Actor, educator, writer, suffragist
- Organization: Women's Freedom League
- Known for: Grille Incident (1908); Balloon Raid (1909)
- Political party: Labour Party
- Criminal charges: Public Order Offences (1908)
- Criminal penalty: Imprisonment 1 month, HM Prison Holloway
- Spouse: William Porter (m. 1914; died 1949)
- Relatives: Leonard Matters (Brother)
- Website: murielmatterssociety.com.au

Signature
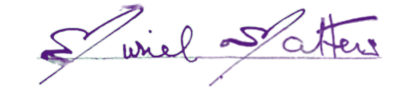

Muriel's 1939 BBC Interview
Matters discusses her life and the women's franchise campaign

Muriel Lilah Matters (12 November 1877 – 17 November 1969) also known as Muriel Mathers, Muriel Porter or Muriel Matters-Porter, was an Australian-born British political activist, suffragist, educator, actress and elocutionist who immigrated from Australia to the United Kingdom in 1905 and remained until her death in 1969. Matters is best known for her work on behalf of the Women's Freedom League at the height of the militant struggle to enfranchise women in the United Kingdom.

== Early life ==
Muriel Matters was born in the inner Adelaide suburb of Bowden in the then Province of South Australia (now known as the State of South Australia), the third of seven children, including brother Leonard Matters, to Methodist parents, Emma Alma Warburton and John Leonard Matters. Matters' father, John Leonard Matters was an agricultural agent, merchant, cabinetmaker and a Councillor on the Port Augusta Council which saw the family living in many locations in South Australia, including Port Augusta and a number of Adelaide suburbs, before the family immigrated to Perth in Western Australia in the early 1900s.

=== Education and early influences ===
In 1894, the Parliament of South Australia passed world first legislation granting South Australian women the right to vote and stand for parliament on the same terms as men in the Province, meaning Matters was eligible to vote from 1898, unlike her contemporaries in other parts of British Empire, including other Australian Colonies or the United Kingdom, likely infliencing her later activity in the British suffrage movement. According to former South Australian Member of Parliament, Frances Bedford, at the age of 14, while attending elocution classes as a child, Matters' was introduced to the works of two 19th-century literary figures, American poet Walt Whitman and the Norwegian playwright Henrik Ibsen, author of A Doll's House, with both figures heavily influencing Matters' political ideology.

Matters studied music at the University of Adelaide, obtaining first and second-class examination results in subjects including, Theory of Music, Pianoforte.

=== Early career ===
In the late 1890s, Matters began a career as an actor, musician and conductor in concert recitals with the Robert Brough Company, with concerts in a number of Australian capital cities, including Adelaide, Sydney and Melbourne. In 1901, Matters returned to a permanent base in Adelaide to teaching elocution and regularly performed for audiences at numerous halls and salons across South Australia.

In 1904, Matters followed her parents and other family members who had relocated to Perth in Western Australia, where she continued her acting and was encouraged by friends in the industry to further her career in London.

== Move to London ==
In August 1905, Matters departed Albany in Western Australia following the advice of friends and colleagues who had encouraged her to pursue a career in London. Matters arrived in London on 6 October 1905 via the SS Persic passenger liner.

== Conversion to the suffrage cause ==
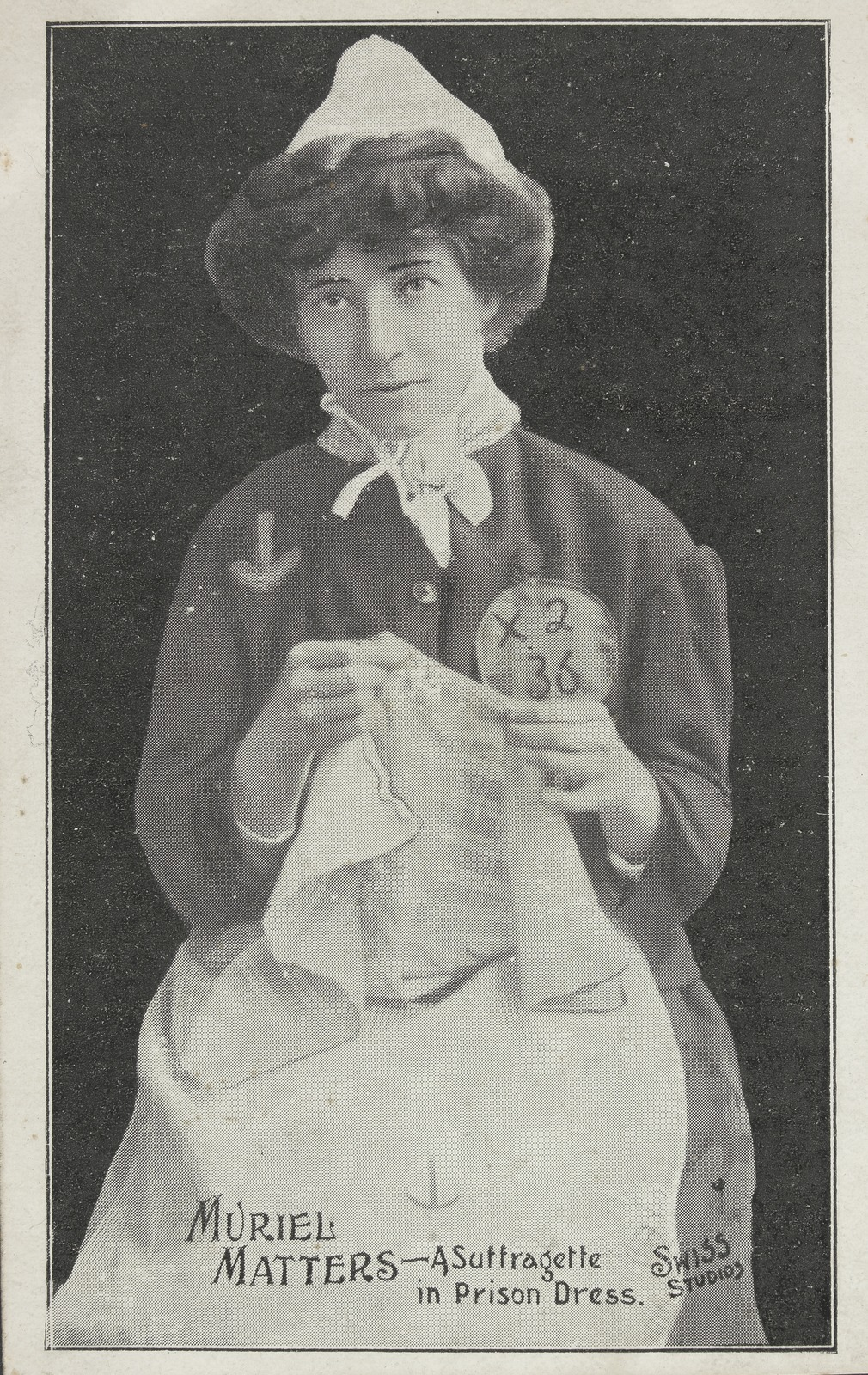
Muriel Matters - a suffragette in prison dress

When Matters arrived in London, she began giving recitals intermittently and eventually performed at the Bechstein Hall (now the Wigmore Hall). However, recital work in London was difficult to acquire due to a surplus of performers, and Matters undertook occasional work as a journalist for income. She is known to have interviewed George Bernard Shaw and the exiled anarchist Prince Peter Kropotkin. Matters eventually performed at the home of Kropotkin and, after her recital, he challenged her to use her skills for something more useful stating that, "Art is not an end of life, but a means." Matters agreed with his assessment and soon became involved with the Women's Freedom League (WFL).

Matters wrote that her encounter with Kropotkin "proved to be the lifetime in a moment lived – my entire mental outlook was changed." The WFL was led by Charlotte Despard and was set up to be more democratic than the Pankhurst-led Women's Social and Political Union (WSPU) suffragettes. Matters accompanied Maud Arncliffe Sennet to an event at which Milicent Fawcett was debating the support for women's militancy. Sennett wrote in the press that Matters had not been forced into silence.

In an interview in 1957 by the BBC, Matters was asked how she became involved in the suffrage movement, saying:

"We had had the parliamentary vote in Australia since 1893, and coming to this country (the United Kingdom), one was surprised to know that it necessitated this great struggle, this conflict, not only with the political powers, but with the people of the country.

So that when I heard one Sunday afternoon in Hyde Park, this appeal being made by women of my own age and generation for this simple elementary measure of justice.

It was that a challenge which I felt I must answer!"

— Muriel Matters, BBC 'First Hand' (14 May 1957)

== Work with the Women's Freedom League ==
=== Caravan tour of 1908 ===
In early May through to mid-October 1908, Matters was "Organiser in Charge" of the first "Votes for Women" caravan that toured the south-east counties of England. The caravan tour began in Oxshott and passed through Surrey, Sussex, East Anglia and Kent. The purpose of the tour was to speak about women's enfranchisement and to establish new WFL branches in the regions. Despite the occasional heckler, Matters and the others involved, such as Charlotte Despard and Amy Hicks, were successful in achieving those aims and established several branches. In Tunbridge Wells, Matters met a young Quaker named Violet Tillard who remained a close acquaintance until Tillard's death in 1922, due to typhus contracted while helping people in famine-ravaged Russia.

=== Grille incident ===
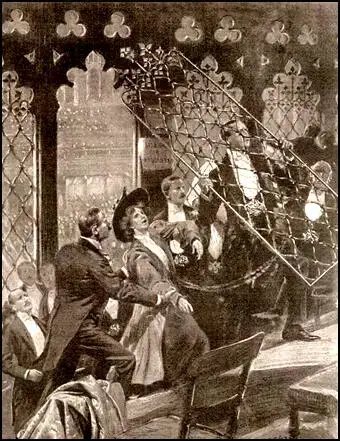
The London Illustrated News illustration of the grille incident, 7 November 1908

The Grille Incident occurred on the night of 28 October 1908, the WFL conducted simultaneous protests at the British Houses of Parliament. It was held outside St Stephen's Entrance, the Old Prison Yard and in the House of Commons. The purpose was to raise attention to the struggle of women and to remove the "grille", a piece of ironwork placed in the Ladies' Gallery that obscured their view of parliamentary proceedings. Matters was at the heart of the protest over that symbol of women's oppression. She and an associate, Helen Fox, both chained themselves to the grille of the Ladies' Gallery and Matters began loudly proclaiming the benefits of enfranchisement directly to the elected MPs.

Although not noted in Hansard, the official record of proceedings in the House of Commons, Matters' pronouncements were, technically, the first speech by a woman in the British Parliament.

Meanwhile, Violet Tillard lowered a proclamation to the politicians below using pieces of string, and a man from the Stranger's Gallery threw handbills onto the floor of Parliament. The police soon seized all the people involved but could not separate Matters and Fox from the grille. Eventually the grille was removed with the women attached and, after being taken to a nearby committee room, a blacksmith was fetched to detach the women from the ironwork. Not charged over the incident, Matters and the other women involved were soon released near St Stephen's Entrance, where they rejoined other members of the WFL who were still protesting. It was there that Matters was arrested on a "trumped-up charge of obstruction", trying to rush the Parliament's lobby.

The following day, 14 women (including Matters) and one man were tried at the Westminster Police Court. Matters was found guilty of wilfully obstructing London Police and was sentenced to one month imprisonment to be served at Holloway Gaol. Emily Duval was arrested, together with her teenage daughter Barbara. They had both been with Matters when she chained herself to the grille. Emily paid her fine, and 17 year old Barbara Duval was released after she said that she would not get involved in any further protests until she was 21 (i.e. an adult).

=== Airship flight ===
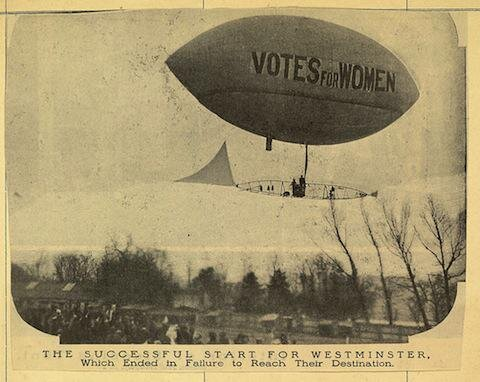
The Votes For Women dirigible lifting off

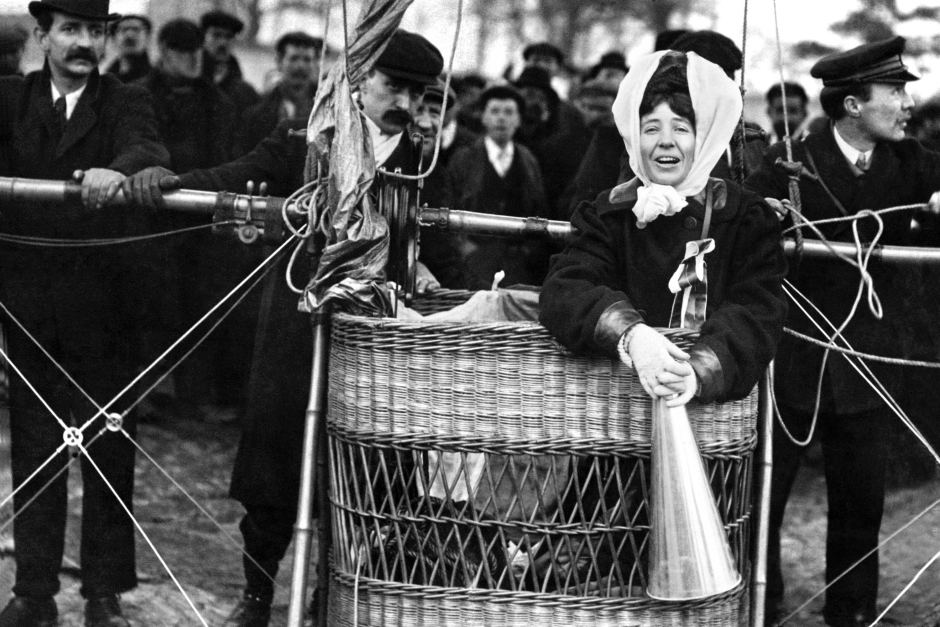
Muriel Matters in the didigible

The Balloon Raid airship flight took place on Tuesday 16 February 1909, during the royal procession of King Edward VII's official opened Parliament for the coming year. As a part of the occasion, there was a procession to the Houses of Parliament led by the King. To gain attention and to promote the suffrage cause, Matters decided to hire a small dirigible (airship) owned by Percival G. Spencer, intending to shower the King and the Houses of Parliament with WFL pamphlets. However, due to adverse wind conditions and the rudimentary motor powering the airship, she never made it to the Palace of Westminster. Instead, Matters, beginning at Hendon airfields, hugged the outskirts of London flying over Wormwood Scrubs, Kensington, Tooting and finally landing in Coulsdon with the trip lasting an hour and a half in total.

With the airship emblazoned with "Votes for Women" on one side and "Women's Freedom League" on the other, it rose to a height of 3,500 feet (1,100 m). Matters scattered 56 pounds (25 kg) of handbills promoting the WFL's cause and leading members of the league, Edith How-Martyn and Elsie Craig, pursued her by car. Her flight made headlines around the world.

== 1910: First lecture tour of Australia ==
Before sailing to Australia, Matters and fellow suffragette Violet Tillard, helped the Women's Freedom League campaign in Liverpool from January to April 1910, and she spoke with Amy Sanderson and Emma Sproson at a mass gathering in Trafalgar Square in April. From May to July 1910, Matters gave lectures focused on her experiences in Britain agitating for change. In the four-month tour, she spoke in Perth (Literary Hall), Adelaide (Town Hall), Melbourne (Princess Theatre) and Sydney (King's Hall). Giving three talks in each city she advocated for prison reform, equal pay for equal work and for the vote to be granted to the women of Great Britain. Accompanied by Violet Tillard on the tour, Matters presented the audience with illustrations related to the movement and donned a facsimile of her prison dress. From the newspaper reports surrounding her visit it is evident that she played to sizeable audiences and that her performances were littered with laughter and applause.

At the conclusion of the lecture tour, Matters helped Vida Goldstein secure an Australian Senate resolution that outlined the country's positive experiences with women's suffrage. The resolution was passed and sent to Prime Minister Asquith in Britain.

== Work in East London ==
Within a year of Matters' return from her native country, she became involved with the "Mothers Arms" project in East London led by Sylvia Pankhurst. Matters and other concerned women worked with poor children and mothers residing in the slums of Lambeth, London. With the help of others, she educated impoverished children in the Montessori method, although she was not formally qualified at that point, in addition to feeding and clothing them. During 1913, Matters ensured that the male dominated National Federation of Mineworkers came to support women's suffrage.

== Work in Scotland ==
During 1913, Matters spent much time campaigning for the suffrage cause in Scotland. For example, in January, she spoke in the Livingstone Hall in Edinburgh on the subject of the Representation Of The People (Women) Bill which had been introduced to parliament. In April, Matters spoke at a number of suffrage meetings in East Fife. In Newhaven, the meeting was chaired by Alice Low, who also spoke at meetings alongside Matters in Armadale and Bathgate (West Lothian) later that year during a local by-election. A letter from Matters in The Scotsman, published in April, denounced forcible feeding and the Cat and Mouse Act, which were being imposed on suffragettes.

Matters was presented with a most unusual souvenir after a meeting in Perth, Tayside in May. Among the missiles thrown at her was a hambone, which was later inscribed "N.U.W.S.S., Perth 20-6-13" and presented to her. Dr Elsie Inglis presided over a meeting in Edinburgh in November 1913, at which Matters was the speaker. In December, Matters spoke in Nairn on the subject of "women in social and political evolution". She made a number of other appearances in Scotland in the first six months of 1914, for instance, in Musselburgh in June when she dealt "most effectively" with the subject of women's suffrage.

== Objection to the First World War ==
In June 1915, a year after the outbreak of World War I, Matters declared her opposition to the war in an address entitled "The False Mysticism of War". In essence, she argued that war was not a successful problem-solving mechanism and that justifications for war were based on false pretences. She expressed her displeasure at Christianity being used as a justification of war, because the origins of the faith made no appeal to armed force. For Matters, those advocating war in government along theological lines could not be trusted: "For their god is in their own consciousness, a magnified edition of themselves." Furthermore, she provided a rebuttal of the militaristic arguments presented in the book War and the World's Life by Colonel Frederic Natusch Maude. Matters also questioned the importance of nationality – the rise of which was a central factor in the outbreak of the war she was denouncing. With the newspapers of the day filled with honour rolls of dead soldiers and advertisements to purchase war bonds, her arguments were in conflict with a society engaged in total war. The address was later reproduced in the form of a pamphlet by the anti-war Peace Committee of the Society of Friends (Quakers) and sold for a small fee. Her brother, Charles Adams Matters, died at the Battle of Lone Pine in August 1915.

== Montessori method ==
In 1916, Matters spent a year in Barcelona attending the Italian educator Maria Montessori's international course, which focused on new education strategies for children, looking at the whole child's development: physical, social, emotional and cognitive. Spain's neutrality during the Great War allowed Matters to go there to study the child-centred approach to learning taught by Montessori, which fitted her view that education should be a universal right. On her return to England she resumed work with the poor children of East London and, on occasion, was invited to lecture education students in England and Scotland on the merits of the Montessori method.

== 1922: Second lecture tour of Australia ==
In 1922, Matters undertook a second lecture tour of Australia but this time her primary concern was to advocate Montessori's ideas to the educators of her native country. Giving lectures in Perth, Sydney, Adelaide and Melbourne, her tour was closely followed by the Australian press.

== Candidate for Hastings ==
After returning to the UK, Matters was selected to run as the Labour Party candidate for the seat of Hastings in the general election of 1924. Her opponent was the incumbent Conservative candidate, Lord Eustace Percy. She ran on a largely socialist platform, advocating a fairer distribution of wealth, work for the unemployed and furthering the equality of the sexes. During the election, her younger brother, Leonard Matters, joined her on the campaign. Leonard's experience as a writer and journalist would have been invaluable in negotiating the hostile Hastings press (Leonard himself was later elected as the member for Kennington in 1929). Despite the Matters’ best efforts, Muriel was unsuccessful, receiving 28.6% of the vote. Lord Eustace Percy was returned with an increased majority of 9,135 which echoed the Conservative gains across the country.

Hastings remained a safe Conservative seat and was not claimed by a Labour Party candidate until 1997.

== Family and Personal life ==
In September 1913, Matters became engaged to William Arnold Porter (1871-1949). Porter was born in Philadelphia and moved to Wilmington, Delaware, where he trained and worked as a dental assistant with dentist, F.C. Smith at the Wilmington Dental Office on Market Street.

In the early 1900s, Porter immigrated to the United Kingdom, where he worked as a Dental Assistant in Leicester, before marrying his first wife, Mabel Buchanan, from Wilmington in 1903 and continuing to work in Leicester. In 1910, Dr Porter moved to London and began working as a Dentist. In 1912, Porter divorced his first wife and in 1914 married Matters. Porter was a founder and past president of the American Dental Society of London. Porter died in 1949 at the age of 79.

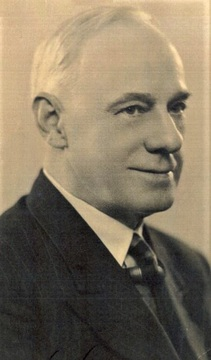
Muriel's brother, Leonard Matters

Matters was also the sister to journalist, former British Member of Parliament and author of The Mystery of Jack the Ripper Leonard Matters, who also acted as election agent for Muriel Matters' 1924 election campaign in Hastings.

== Later life and death ==
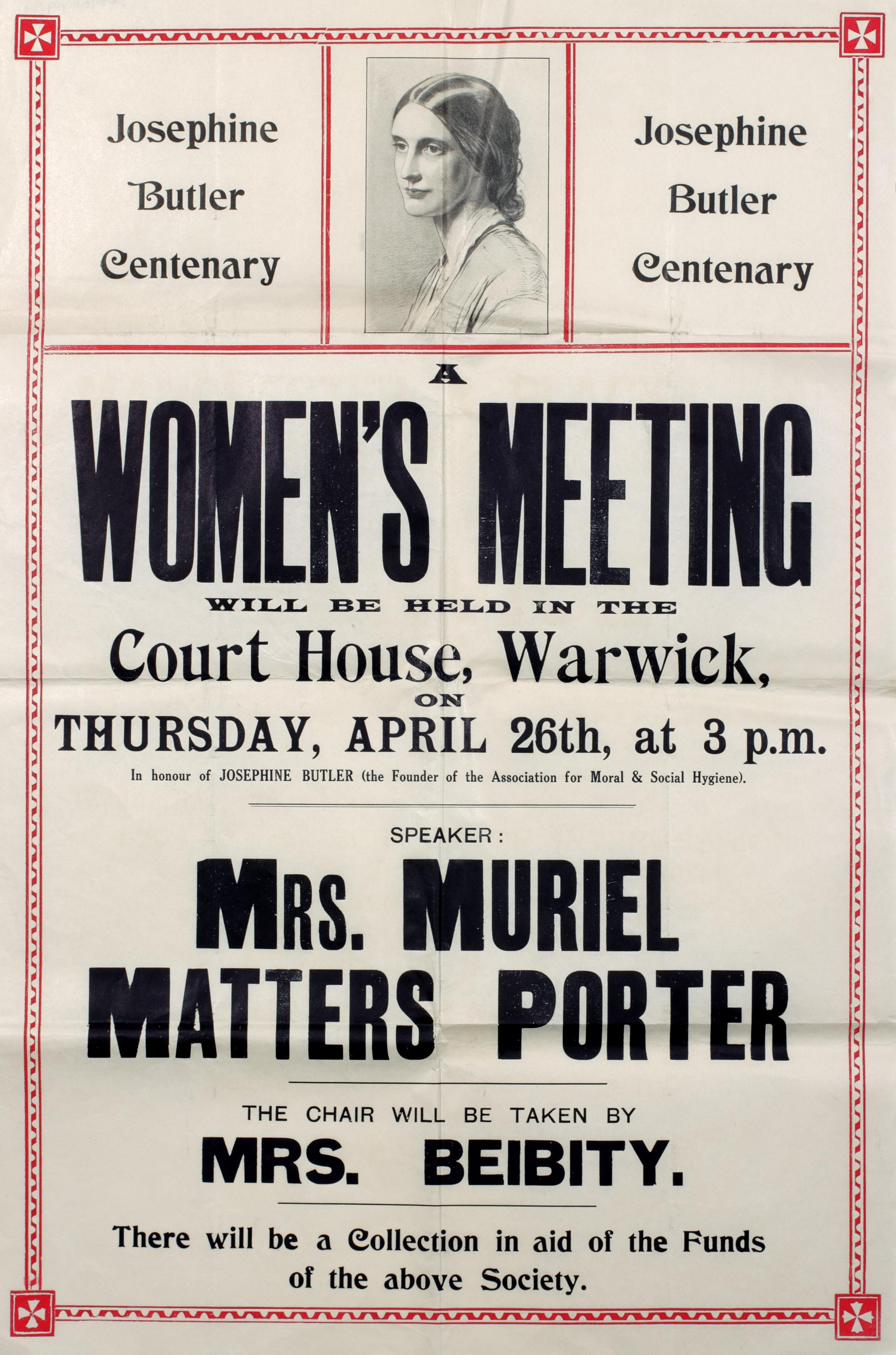
Speaking in 1928 to voters

In the years after the election, Matters settled in Hastings with her husband. In 1928, a fifty-one-year-old Matters finally saw the achievement of what she and other women of Great Britain were seeking, equal suffrage for women and men (partial suffrage had been granted to women in 1918). In her later years, Matters often wrote letters to the editor of newspapers, frequented the local library and was heavily involved in the Hastings community. Controversial to the end, she was locally reported as seen "skinny dipping" at Pelham Beach.

Widowed in 1949, Matters died 21 years later, on 17 November 1969, aged 92, at the St Leonards on Sea nursing home. Her ashes were scattered in the Hastings Cemetery.

== Legacy ==
Following her death, Matters was not given the same recognition in Australia as she had been in the United Kingdom.

=== Muriel Matters Society ===
In 2009, following the re-discovery of Muriel's work, Frances Bedford, at the time a member of the Parliament of South Australia, led a group of people who set up the non-profit organisation, the Muriel Matters Society with the mission of researching the history, career and life’s work of Matters and encouraging the adoption of Matters' principles for social justice, equality, women’s participation, education for all, industrial fairness and world peace.

In 2010, the Society commissioned the play Why Muriel Matters, which was performed in the Adelaide Town Hall in June of that year and coinciding with the 100th anniversary of Matters' 1910 appearance at the same venue. In 2013, the Society commissioned a docu-drama, Muriel Matters! at IMDb, which was a feature presentation at the Adelaide Film Festival and broadcast on ABC TV.

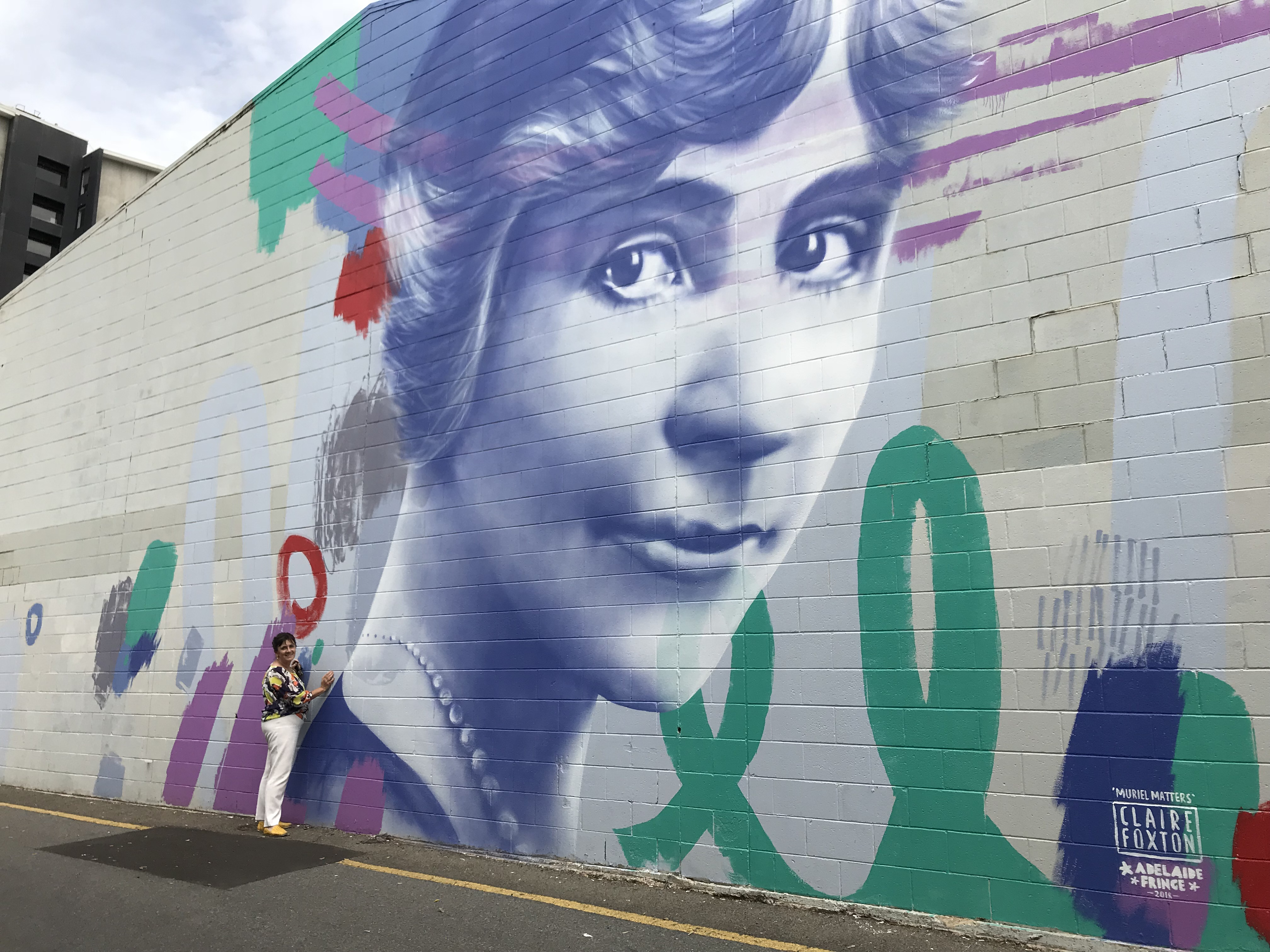
Frances Bedford with the Muriel Matters Mural in Bowden (2018)

In 2018, a mural of Matters was commissioned by the Society, and unveiled in the Adelaide suburb of Bowden where Matters was born.

In 2021, the then Speaker of the Parliament of South Australia, Dan Cregan MP and then Minister for Education, John Gardner MP instituted the Muriel Matters Award for South Australian secondary school students who show self-initiative and commitment to making a difference in the community.

In 2022, the Hastings Borough Council in the United Kingdom renamed their council offices, Muriel Matters House to commemorate the life and work of Matters, who was also a long-term resident in the area. The Society also presented the Council with a maquette or model of Matters, to be displayed in the newly named council offices; and a blue plaque was placed on the former Hastings home on Matters, at 7 Pelham Crescent in Hastings 9100395672 Muriel Matters on OpenStreetMap.

== See also ==
- Grille Incident
- Balloon Raid
- Women's suffrage in the United Kingdom
- Women's Freedom League
- Leonard Matters

== Bibliography ==
- Wainwright, Robert; Australian Broadcasting Corporation (2017), Miss Muriel Matters, Sydney, NSW HarperCollinsPublishers Australia Pty Limited, ISBN 978-0-7333-3373-6
- Wright, Clare (2018). You Daughters of Freedom: The Australians Who Won the Vote and Inspired the World. Melbourne: Text Publishing. ISBN 9781925603934.
