= 1933 Fulham East by-election =

UK by-election

The 1933 Fulham East by-election, in Fulham, on 25 October 1933 was held after Conservative Member of Parliament (MP) Kenyon Vaughan-Morgan died. The election was surprisingly won by John Charles Wilmot of Labour.

The seat itself is wrongly regarded as a 'safe' Conservative seat because it returned a Conservative at most previous elections. However, it was marginal in most of those occasions except the remarkable circumstances of 1931 and Labour's electoral destruction.

The election was seen as a test of the developing mood of pacifism in the country at the time, so much so that it became known as the 'Peace by-election'. The heavy defeat for the National Government candidate, a strong supporter of rearmament, helped, along with the Peace Ballot of 1935, to bring about a rethink in the government's agenda.

== Result ==
Fulham by-election, 1933
Party	Candidate	Votes	%	±%
Labour	John Wilmot	17,790	57.9	+31.8
Conservative	William Waldron	12,950	42.1	−26.6
Majority		4,840	15.8	N/A
Turnout		30,740	59.5	−7.6
Labour gain from Conservative		Swing	+29.2	

== Previous result ==
General election 1931: Fulham East
Party	Candidate	Votes	%	±%
Conservative	Kenyon Vaughan-Morgan	23,438	68.7	+14.4
Labour	H J Maynard	8,917	26.1	−13.3
Liberal	J H Greenwood	1,788	5.2	−11.1
Majority		14,521	42.6	+37.7
Turnout		34,143	66.1	−0.5
Conservative hold		Swing		

== Aftermath ==
A correspondent in The Glasgow Herald described the result as "an unpleasant surprise", noting that while it was not expected that Waldron would obtain "a large majority, there was a confident hope that he at least would win through. Certainly a Labour majority of 4840 was not in the picture." The same author considered various factors as lying behind the result including apathy of Conservative and Liberal voters, and Germany's withdrawal from the League of Nations and the World Disarmament Conference causing a "War scare" which Wilmot's supporters exploited to win votes, particularly from female voters.

Ultimately Wilmot would fail to be re-elected for the seat at the next general election, with the Conservative William Astor gaining the seat with a majority of just over 1,000 votes.
