= George Harvey (British politician) =

British politician (1868–1939)

Sir George Harvey (20 November 1868 – 27 March 1939) was a British Conservative Party politician who served as the member of parliament (MP) for the Kennington division of Lambeth from 1924 to 1929, and from 1931 until his death.

Harvey was born in Throxenby, Scarborough, the son of John Harvey, a staff sergeant in the Yorkshire Militia from Armagh, Ireland, and Fanny Humphrey Harvey. George came to London as a young boy to seek his fortune, spending his first night in Kennington.

Harvey won the Kennington seat at the 1924 general election, defeating the sitting Labour MP T. S. B. Williams. He was unseated at the 1929 general election by the Labour candidate Leonard Matters, an Australian journalist, but ousted Matters in 1931 with a majority of 28.6% of the votes. He was re-elected in 1935, and held the seat until 1939, when he died suddenly in West Kingston, near Angmering-on-Sea, aged 70.

He was knighted in the king's 1936 Birthday Honours for "political and public services".

Sir George Harvey was elected chairman of the Royal Infant Orphanage on 12 October 1937. He succeeded John Wilson Hope CBE who had been chairman of the RIO since 1917.

In 1894, he married Sarah Kenward, and had a son and a daughter. Their son, Captain Percival George Arthur Harvey, contested Peckham as a Conservative Party candidate at the by-election in May 1936.

Parliament of the United Kingdom
Preceded by Thomas Williams	Member of Parliament for Kennington; 1924 – 1929	Succeeded by Leonard Matters
Preceded by Leonard Matters	Member of Parliament for Kennington; 1931 – 1939	Succeeded by John Wilmot
