= Violet Tillard =

British suffragette and nurse

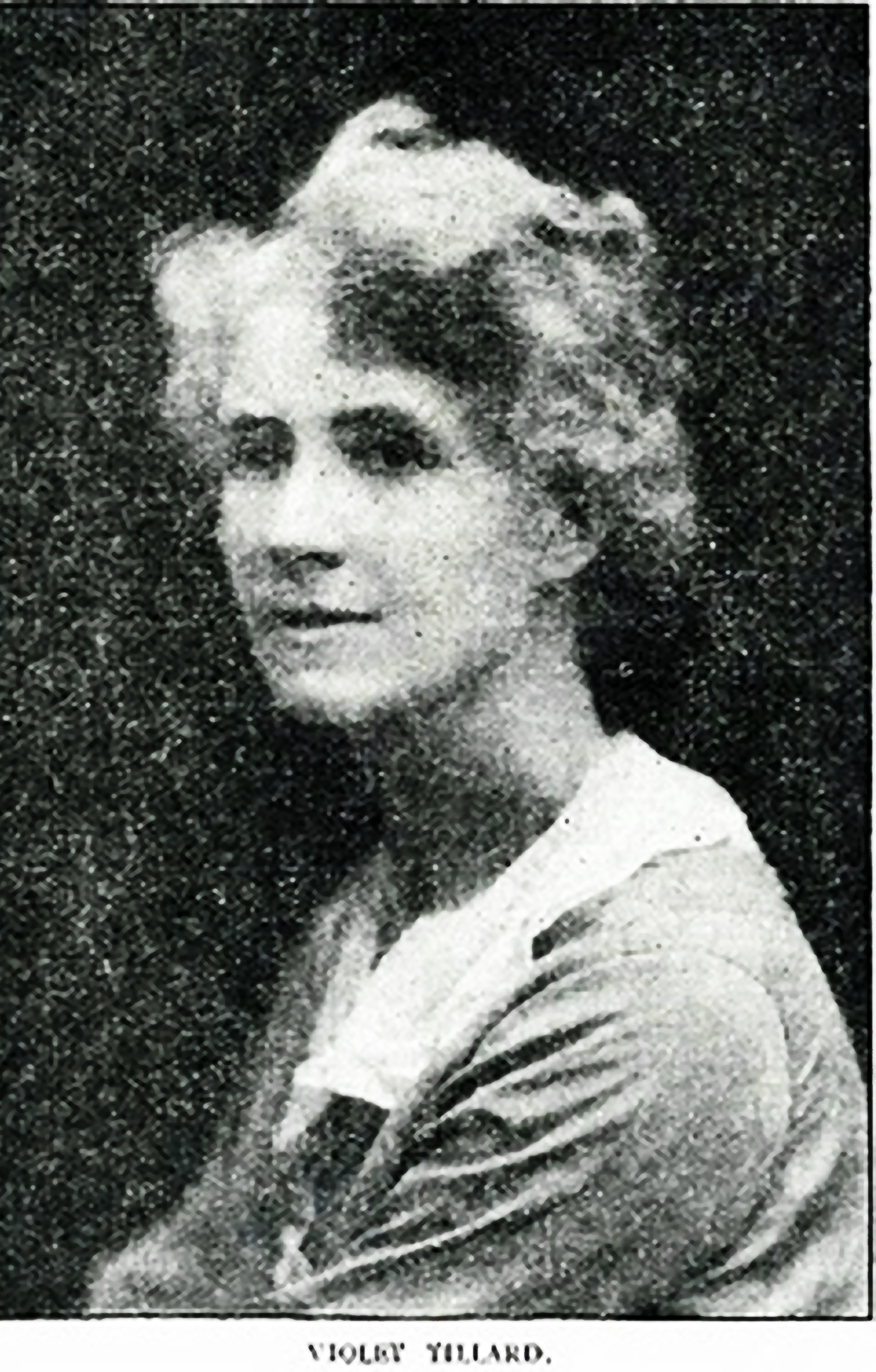
- Tillard in 1920
- Born: Violet Ellen Anstey Tillard; 29 December 1874; Salem, Madras Presidency, British Raj
- Died: 19 February 1922 (aged 47); Buzuluk, Russian SFSR
- Cause of death: Typhus
- Burial place: Lost unmarked grave, Russia
- Other name: Nelly Tillard
- Citizenship: United Kingdom
- Occupations: Nurse, relief worker, suffragist
- Organization: Women's Freedom League
- Known for: Grille Incident (1908)
- Criminal charges: Public Order Offences (1908); Offences against the DORA Act (1918)
- Criminal penalty: Imprisonment 1 month (1908); Imprisonment 61 days (1918)
- Parents: George Henry Tillard (father); Louisa Fanny Anstey (mother)
- Relatives: Lilian Irene Tillard (sister)

Violet Ellen Anstey Tillard (29 December 1874 – 19 February 1922) also known as Nelly Tillard was a British suffragette, nurse, pacifist, supporter of conscientious objectors, international famine relief worker and devout Quaker.

== Early life ==
Tillard was born in British India in 1874 to Lieutenant-Colonel George Henry Tillard a former Indian Military Forces Officer, and his wife Louisa Fanny. She was known as "Till" to friends and family. She trained as a nurse at the Poplar and Great Ormond Street hospitals in London.

== Work with the Women's Freedom League ==
=== Caravan tour ===
Tillard became involved with the Women's Freedom League (WFL) in 1908 and soon rose to the position of Assistant Organising Secretary. From May to mid-October of that year she helped establish branches of the League on a caravan tour of the southeast counties of England, such as in Norwich. The 'Votes For Women' caravan tour passed through Kent, East Anglia, Surrey and Sussex. It was on this tour that Tillard met Muriel Matters who was to remain a lifelong companion. Matters would later write of her friend's courage, sympathy, generosity and selflessness, stating that Tillard, "set one a standard to live by".

=== Role in the Grille Protest ===
The Grille Incident took place on 28 October 1908, when the Women's Freedom League organised a large demonstration to take place at the Palace of Westminster. It was an organised protest that took place at similar times throughout the Palace of Westminster – outside St Stephen's Entrance, the Old Prison Yard and in the House of Commons. The purpose of the protest was to draw attention to the struggle of women and remove the 'Grille', a piece of ironwork placed in the Ladies' Gallery that obscured their view of parliamentary proceedings.

Violet's role was in the latter part of the demonstration – to remove the offensive grille from the Ladies' Gallery. Tillard was joined in the House of Commons with her close friend Muriel Matters, Helen Fox and two male supporters in the Strangers' Gallery. Fox and Matters both chained themselves directly to the Grille and Matters began addressing the MPs directly, while the males in the Strangers' Gallery showered the house with handbills. Tillard's role was to force a WFL proclamation through the Grille and lower it on to the floor of the House using string. All four protagonists were set upon by attendants but were later released that night without charge. After they were permitted to leave Matters and Tillard immediately rejoined the protest outside St Stephen's portals but were subsequently arrested for attempting to break the police lines.

The pair and eleven other members of the Women's Freedom League spent the following month in Holloway Gaol. Matters later recounted that, despite the ugly prison garb, "Till managed to look so graceful. How Cheerful she was, how philosophic when many were either 'edgy' [or] 'weepy with strain, or rebellion."

=== Violet's sister and the Women's Freedom League ===
Violet's sister, Irene Tillard, was also involved with the Women's Freedom League. She is known to have helped on the caravan tour of 1908, and in August 1909 was arrested with eight other members of the WFL (including Charlotte Despard) for picketing outside 10 Downing Street, London. The picket prevented the Prime Minister, H. H. Asquith, entering his residence and the group were later sentenced to serve seven days imprisonment or pay fines of 40 shillings. As was the suffragist tradition they intended not to pay the fine and serve their imprisonment. However, as paying the fine did not require the consent of the incarcerated, the group's fines were anonymously paid against their will.

== Work between 1910 and the outbreak of war ==
From May to early August 1910 Tillard accompanied Muriel Matters to Australia where her friend gave lectures focusing on her experiences in Britain agitating for change.

When the 1911 census was taken, Tillard was living with Matters and Margaret Jewson in Lambeth and they participated in the suffragette census boycott. Tillard wrote on the household census form: “No Vote No Census. Should women become persons in the eye of the law this session - full information will be forwarded.”

She is also known to have been in Dublin from 1912 to 1914, supporting the striking Dublin Transport Workers which was in the period in which the Dublin Lockout occurred.

== Conscientious objection to the First World War ==
During the First World War Tillard was energised into helping conscientious objectors. She was appointed Co-Treasurer of the No-Conscription Fellowship's Maintenance Committee. However, on 23 May 1918 Tillard found herself once again in court for her agitations. She was on trial for refusing to disclose to police the name of the person who printed the March edition of the No-Conscription Fellowship News. Tillard was found guilty under the Defence of the Realm Act and was sentenced to 61 days imprisonment to be served once again at Holloway.

== Famine relief worker in post-war Germany and Russia ==
In 1919 Tillard travelled to war-torn Germany to help people recover from the effects of the war. She went with a Quaker mission organised by Joan Fry and in December of that year Tillard formally applied to become a member of the Religious Society of Friends. Whilst in defeated Germany she was confronted with immense misery and helped some students in Berlin survive the hardship. She provided relief in Germany as a nurse until October 1921 where she was transferred to famine-ravaged Buzuluk in Russia to help organise the relief work. There she found famine on a grand scale with an estimated five million dead at the conclusion of the food shortage. Confronted with mass impoverishment she wrote:

"One feels horrible to live in such good conditions when the people are literally starving at our doors – a boy of sixteen lies dead a few yards away... It isn't so harrowing to see them lying dead. They suffer no more. It is the doomed shadows one sees around the streets and in the homes that are most horrible."

Tillard continued her tireless work with the Religious Society of Friends to help curb the suffering of the masses.

== Death ==
Whilst in Russia Tillard's skills as a nurse were temporarily called upon in the Pavlovka District near her current post in Buzuluk. There, three fellow relief workers had fallen ill with typhus and it was her job to nurse them back to health. She was successful in accomplishing her objective but soon contracted the same disease. Tillard died of typhus on 19 February 1922.

Tillard's death was to feature briefly in the writings of Leon Trotsky who praised her work during the famine:

"In our bloodstained and at the same time heroic epoch, there are people who, regardless of their class position, are guided exclusively by the promptings of humanity and inner nobility. I read a brief obituary of this Anglo-Saxon woman, Violet Tillard; a delicate, frail creature, she worked here, at Buzuluk, under the most frightful conditions, fell at her post, and was buried there.... Probably she was no different from those others who also fell at their posts, serving their fellow human beings.... Here we count six such graves... These graves are a kind of augury of those future, new relations between people which will be based upon solidarity and will not be shadowed by self-seeking. When the Russian people become a little richer they will erect (we are profoundly sure of this) a great monument to these fallen heroes, the forerunners of a better human morality, for which we, too, are fighting".

== Legacy ==
In 2023, to mark the centenary of the Volga famine (1921–1922), an art competition named after Violet Tillard was held.[6]
