= Robert Gent-Davis =

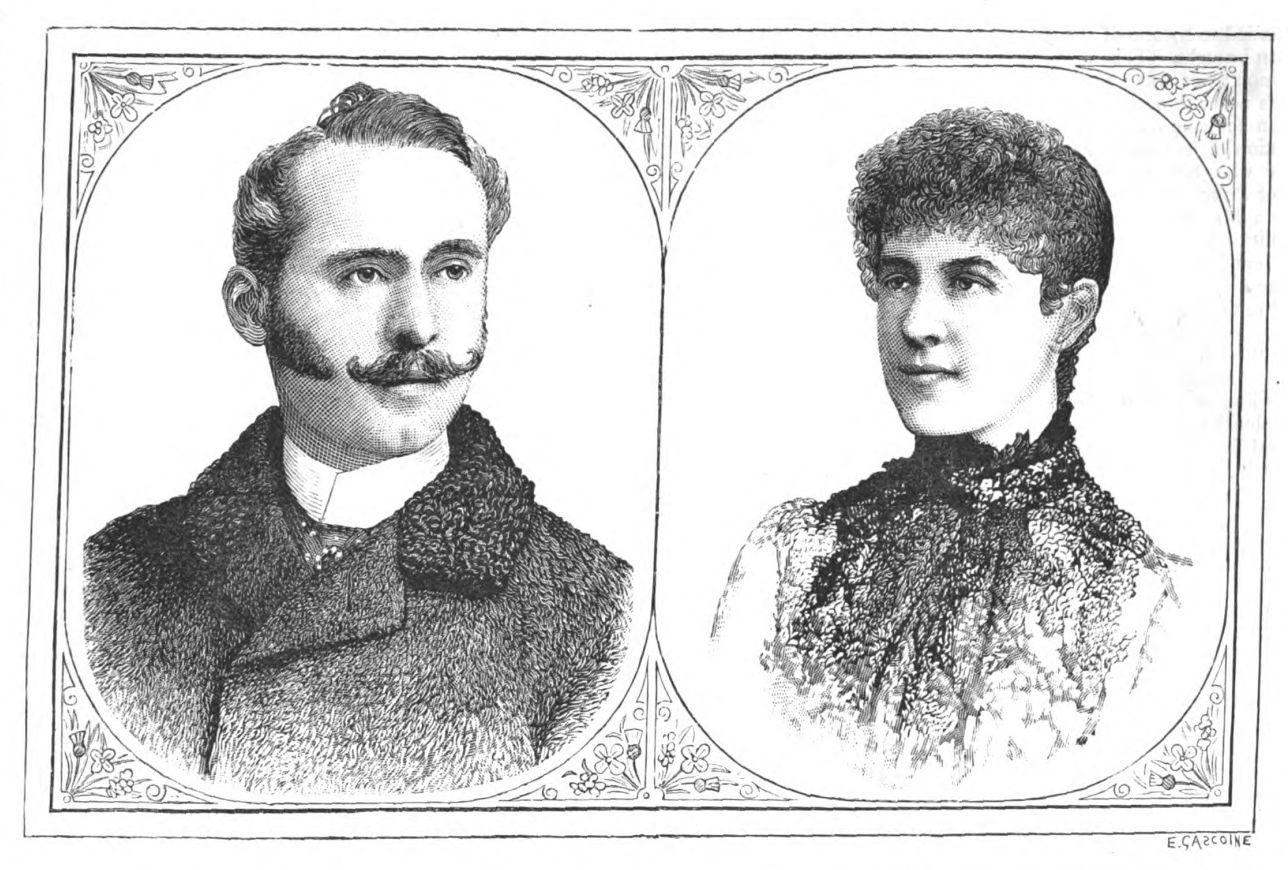
Mr and Mrs Gent-Davis, 1886.

Robert Gent-Davis (1 July 1857 – 1903) was an English businessman and Conservative politician.

Davis was born at Pimlico, the son of Robert Davis and his wife née Gent. He was educated privately and became a distillers chemist. He became head of the firm of Sparks, White, & Co Distillers' Chemists of Smithfield. He became the owner of a newspaper, the South London Standard, which was to support his electoral campaign.

Gent-Davis was elected Member of Parliament for Kennington in 1885. In 1886, he was accused of corrupt electoral practices for expenses in connection with the purchase of the newspaper and voter registration but the judge ruled in his favour. However, in November 1888 he was sent to prison for contempt of court when he failed to pay into Court a large sum of money in trust which he had appropriated for his own use. He was forced to resign his seat.

In 1880, he married Blanche Ellen Dixon, daughter of William Dixon of the Admiralty. Gent-Davis died in the Fulham district at the age of 45 in the 2nd quarter of 1903.

Parliament of the United Kingdom
New constituency Lambeth	Member of Parliament for Kennington; 1885 – 1889	Succeeded by Mark Hanbury Beaufoy
