= Mark Beaufoy =

English astronomer and physicist

Colonel Mark Beaufoy FRS (4 March 1764 – 4 May 1827) was an English astronomer and physicist, mountaineer, explorer and British Army officer. His father, Mark Beaufoy (1718–1782), who was originally from Evesham, established a vinegar factory in Lambeth, London.

He was the first-known English climber to make an ascent of a high mountain in the Alps. In 1787, he made an ascent (the fourth) of Mont Blanc. This mountain was an attraction to his fellow countrymen, such as J. D. Forbes (1809–1868), A. T. Malkin (1803–1888), John Ball (1818–1889) and Sir Alfred Wills (1828–1912). He describes his ascent of Mont Blanc:

At last, however, but with a sort of apathy which scarcely admitted the sense of joy, we reached the summit of the mountain; when six of my guides, and with them my servant, threw themselves on their faces and were immediately asleep. I envied them their repose; but my anxiety to obtain a good observation for the latitude, subdued my wishes for indulgence.

He devoted much of his life to naval experiments at the Greenland Dock with James Scott and Captain John Luard of the "Society for the Improvement in Naval Architecture". He published the results of his work in one of the leading scientific journals of the day, The Annals of Philosophy. In 1815 he described a recording tide meter, and in the same article went on to describe the power of the wind on square sails and the resistance to motion both in air and water of different shapes. The paper moved from ship sails to considering the best angle for windmill sails to be set. He supplied Astronomical and Magnetic observations from Hackney Wick (51°32‘40“N, 6.82“W) for many issues. Charles Hutton's 1815 list of England's most notable private observatories included Colonel Beaufoy's.

In 1816 Beaufoy published another extensive article based on his experimental work. On the Stability of Vessels was based on 23 different hull forms tested for their resistance to rolling. The article includes an illustration of his apparatus showing a hull form being subjected to a controlled heeling force with a plumb bob and scale to measure the inclination. The various tables of results show the metacentre. The dichotomy between resistance to rolling and sea keeping is discussed.

A volume Nautical and Hydraulic Experiments with Numerous Scientific Miscellanies was published posthumously by his son Henry in 1834 (one volume only, called Volume I). Beaufoy also made astronomical observations and advocated other ideas like rifles in the militia and schemes for reaching the North Pole. This volume challenged the existing orthodoxy that the resistance to motion of a vessel was in proportion to her displacement. Chapman had challenged this earlier (1775), but Beaufoy's work was taken up by Isambard Kingdom Brunel as the "square-cube" law. Simply put, if a vessel is doubled in size the resistance to motion quadruples, but the size of engines and the carrying capacity (fuel, cargo) increase eight-fold.

He married his cousin Margaretta Beaufoy (died 1800) in a 1784 "runaway" marriage, after which they had a "long sojurn" in Switzerland. They had three sons (Henry, Mark and George) and a daughter; Margaretta took the infant girl Henriette to watch Mark ascend Mont Blanc. She assisted him with mathematical and astronomical calculations.

Beaufoy was commissioned Captain of the Hackney Volunteer Company in 1794 and Colonel of the 1st Regiment of Tower Hamlets Militia in 1797. However, in October 1813 he was court-martialled for the "vexatious and frivolous" disciplining of a junior officer and was relieved of his command in January 1814.

His grandson, Mark Hanbury Beaufoy, was an English vinegar manufacturer and politician. The family firm is now called British Vinegars Limited.

== Bibliography ==
- Beaufoy, Mark (October 1815), Thomson, Thomas (ed.), "Description of an Instrument to measure and register the Rise and Fall of the Tide throughout the whole Flow and Ebb", Annals of Philosophy, vol. VI, no. XXXIV, London: Robert Baldwin, pp 273 – 281
- Beaufoy, Mark (March 1816), Thomson, Thomas (ed.), "On the Stability of Vessels", Annals of Philosophy, vol. VII, no. XXXIX, London: Robert Baldwin, pp 184 – 204
- Beaufoy, Mark (1834), Beaufoy, Henry (ed.), Nautical and Hydraulic Experiments, with numerous Scientific Miscellanies, vol. I, South Lambeth, Surrey, UK: Privately published by the editor Only the first of a planned three volumes was published
- Clerke, Agnes Mar (1885). "Beaufoy, Mark" . In Stephen, Leslie (ed.). Dictionary of National Biography. Vol. 04. London: Smith, Elder & Co.
- Garrison, Ervan G. (1998), History of Engineering and Technology: Artful Methods (2nd ed.), CRC Press, ISBN 9780849398100
- Hutton, Charles (1815), "English observatories (private)", A Philosophical and Mathematical Dictionary, vol. 2, p. 129
- Kerr, Barbara (1974), The Dispossessed: An Aspect of Victorian Social History, London: John Baker, ISBN 0-212-97008-9 discusses the related Thornhill & Beaufoy families and the social changes in Victorian England following the industrial revolution.
- McConnell, Anita (January 2008) [2004]. "Beaufoy, Mark (1764–1827)". Oxford Dictionary of National Biography (online ed.). Oxford University Press. (Subscription, Wikipedia Library access or UK public library membership required.)
- Major, Joanne; Murden, Sarah (27 November 2017), A Georgian heroine: the intriguing life of Rachel Charlotte Williams Biggs, Pen & Sword History, ISBN 9781473863460
