= Thomas Williams (Kennington MP) =

British politician (1877–1927)

Lieutenant-Colonel Thomas Samuel Beauchamp Williams (1877 – 7 July 1927) was a British physician of the Indian Medical Service, and a Labour Party politician. He was the member of parliament (MP) for the Kennington division of Lambeth from 1923 to 1924.

== Biography ==
In 1902, he passed out from the Army Medical School, Punjab, and gained the rank of Lieutenant in the Indian Medical Service. He reached the rank of Lieutenant-Colonel, a brevet promotion in the Indian Medical Service in 1917, serving through the First World War. In 1922, he criticised the hospitals policy of the British Medical Association from the Labour Party point of view.

Williams first stood for Parliament at the 1922 general election in Bridgwater division of Somerset, where came a poor third with only 6.7% of the votes. At the 1923 general election he stood in Kennington, a Conservative-held seat which he won with a majority of 2.4% of the votes. However, he was defeated at the next general, election in October 1924 by the Conservative candidate George Harvey, and polled a poor third at the June 1925 by-election in Eastbourne, after which he did not stand again.

Parliament of the United Kingdom
Preceded by Francis Capel Harrison	Member of Parliament for Kennington; 1923 – 1924	Succeeded by George Harvey
