= Alice Lucas (politician) =

British parliamentary candidate

Alice Theresa Lucas
- Born: Alice Theresa Stern; 6 May 1853; Marylebone, London
- Died: 3 May 1924 (aged 70); St James's, London
- Known for: The UK's first Conservative Party woman candidate

Alice Theresa Lucas (née Stern (6 May 1853 – 3 May 1924) was a British parliamentary candidate in the 1918 General Election. She was the first woman candidate for the Conservative Party.

== Life ==
Alice Theresa Stern was born in Marylebone in 1853 to a Jewish family. Her father was David de Stern in the Portuguese nobility and a co-founder of the investment banking company Stern Brothers. Her mother was Sophia Goldsmid, daughter of Aaron Asher Goldsmid, brother of Sir Isaac Goldsmid.

She married Colonel Francis Alfred Lucas in 1887. He was a businessman who took to politics and was a member of Parliament. They lived at Stornaway House in Cleveland Row in St James's, London from 1898.

In 1918 her husband died in the flu pandemic when he was the prospective Conservative candidate for Kennington. She was selected to replace him, and the election in that constituency was delayed for six days to allow time for her to be nominated. This was the first British general election where some women were allowed to vote and Alice Lucas became the first ever woman to be a Conservative Party candidate in a general election. She took 32.2 per cent of the vote and came second to the Liberal candidate Henry Purchase, who had been endorsed by David Lloyd George's coalition government. If she had have been elected she would have been the first woman member of parliament in Great Britain. She did much better than her husband had when contesting this seat but it has been commented that "there is nothing like bereavement, injury or childbirth to commend a candidate to the British electorate".

Lucas died at home in Stornaway House in 1924, aged 70.
