= John Wilmot, 1st Baron Wilmot of Selmeston =

British Labour Party politician (1893–1964)

The Right Honourable The Lord Wilmot of Selmeston PC
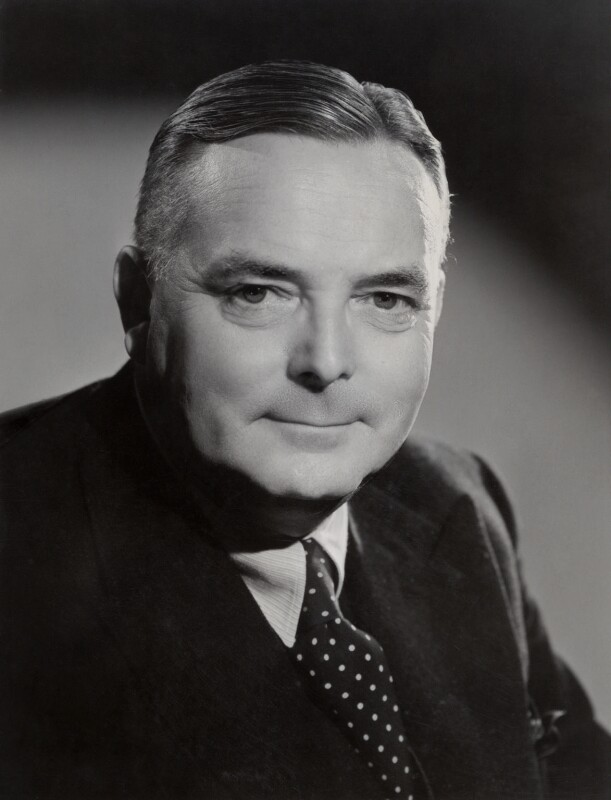

Minister of Aircraft Production
- In office 4 August 1945 – 1 April 1946
- Prime Minister: Clement Attlee
- Preceded by: Ernest Brown
- Succeeded by: Office abolished

Minister of Supply
- In office 3 August 1945 – 7 October 1947
- Prime Minister: Clement Attlee
- Preceded by: Andrew Duncan
- Succeeded by: George Strauss

Member of Parliament for Deptford
- In office 25 July 1945 – 30 January 1950
- Preceded by: Walter Green
- Succeeded by: Jack Cooper

Member of Parliament for Kennington
- In office 24 May 1939 – 5 July 1945
- Preceded by: George Harvey
- Succeeded by: Charles Gibson

Member of Parliament for Fulham East
- In office 23 October 1933 – 14 November 1935
- Preceded by: Kenyon Vaughan-Morgan
- Succeeded by: William Astor

Personal details
- Born: John Charles Wilmot; 2 April 1893 London, England
- Died: 22 July 1964 (aged 71) London, England
- Party: Labour
- Education: King's College London

John Charles Wilmot, 1st Baron Wilmot of Selmeston PC (2 April 1893 – 22 July 1964) was a British Labour Party politician. He served under Clement Attlee as Minister of Aircraft Production from 1945 to 1946 and as Minister of Supply from 1945 to 1947.

== Early life ==
Wilmot was born in Woolwich in 1893. He was educated at Hither Green central school, and went on to pursue evening classes at Chelsea Polytechnic and at King's College London. He worked in banking and served in the Royal Naval Air Service during World War I.

== Political career ==
1951 television interview

Wilmot was a member of the Independent Labour Party and the Fabian Society from age sixteen, and was a founder of the Lewisham Labour Party in 1919. After three previous failed attempts, he was elected as Member of Parliament (MP) for Fulham East at a by-election in 1933, but lost his seat at the 1935 general election. His victory in the Conservative-held seat at the by-election was something of a surprise. A correspondent reporting the result in The Glasgow Herald described his victory as "an unpleasant surprise", noting that while it was not expected that his Conservative opponent would hold the seat with "a large majority, there was a confident hope that he at least would win through. Certainly a Labour majority of 4840 was not in the picture." The same report argued various factors as bringing about his victory including apathy of Conservative and Liberal voters compared to the strong support he received from Labour electors. The report also argued that Germany's withdrawal from the League of Nations and the World Disarmament Conference had caused a "War scare" which Wilmot's supporters fully exploited to win votes, particularly from female voters in the constituency.

Wilmot was elected as an alderman of London County Council in November 1937, remaining a member until 1945. He returned to the House of Commons at another by-election, in 1939 as MP for Kennington. Wilmot was re-elected to Parliament at the 1945 election for the Deptford constituency, and served in Clement Attlee's post-war government as Minister of Aircraft Production from 1945 to 1946, when that office was abolished, and as Minister of Supply from 1945 to 1947. He was admitted to the Privy Council in 1945. He retired from the House of Commons at the 1950 general election and was raised to the peerage as Baron Wilmot of Selmeston, of Selmeston in the County of Sussex, on 30 January 1950.

== Personal life ==
Wilmot married Elsa Slate in 1928. He died at St George's Hospital on 22 July 1964, aged 71.

Parliament of the United Kingdom
Preceded by Sir Kenyon Vaughan-Morgan	Member of Parliament for Fulham East; 1933–1935	Succeeded by Hon. William Astor
Preceded by Sir George Harvey	Member of Parliament for Kennington; 1939–1945	Succeeded by Charles Gibson
Preceded by Walter Green	Member of Parliament for Deptford; 1945–1950	Succeeded by Jack Cooper
Political offices
Preceded by Ernest Brown	Minister of Aircraft Production; 1945–1946	Office abolished
Preceded by Andrew Duncan	Minister of Supply; 1945–1947	Succeeded by George Strauss
Peerage of the United Kingdom
New creation	Baron Wilmot of Selmeston; 1950–1964	Extinct
