= Henry Norris (businessman) =

English businessman, politician and football club director (1865–1934)

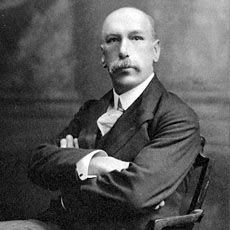

Member of Parliament for Fulham East
- In office 14 December 1918 – 26 October 1922
- Preceded by: Constituency established
- Succeeded by: Kenyon Vaughan-Morgan

Personal details
- Born: Henry George Norris; 23 July 1865 Kennington, London, England
- Died: 30 July 1934 (aged 69) Barnes, Surrey, England
- Party: Conservative
- Occupation: Property developer, businessman, politician
- Known for: Chairmanship of Arsenal and Fulham football clubs

Sir Henry George Norris (23 July 1865 – 30 July 1934) was an English businessman, politician and football club director, most famous for his chairmanship of both Fulham and Arsenal.

== Business and political career ==
Born in Kennington, to a working-class family but educated privately, Norris left school at 14 to join a solicitor's firm, leaving 18 years later to pursue a career in property development trade, partnering W.G. Allen in the firm Allen & Norris. He made his fortune building houses in south and west London — Fulham in particular. He was commissioned into the 2nd Tower Hamlets Rifle Volunteers in 1896, but resigned the following year. He was later Mayor of the Metropolitan Borough of Fulham from 1909 to 1919, a member of the London County Council from 1916 to 1919, and served as Conservative Member of Parliament (MP) for Fulham East from 1918 to 1922, retiring after falling out with his party on the issue of tariff reform.

During World War I Norris had worked heavily as a military recruitment officer for the British Army. He served in the 3rd Middlesex Artillery Volunteers and in the 1917 Birthday Honours he was knighted and given the honorary rank of colonel for services to his country. He was also a prominent Freemason, rising to become Grand Deacon of the United Grand Lodge of England, and a well-known local philanthropist with close connections to the Church of England; he counted the Archbishop of Canterbury, Randall Thomas Davidson as a personal friend.

== Chairmanship of Fulham FC ==
A keen football fan, Norris first became a director of Fulham, during which time the Cottagers were elected to the Football League. While chairman of Fulham, between 1903 and 1908, Norris had an indirect role in the foundation of nearby Chelsea Football Club. He was offered the chance to move Fulham to Stamford Bridge, which businessman Gus Mears had recently acquired, but Norris baulked at the £1500 per annum rent, so Mears subsequently created his own team to occupy the ground.

== Chairmanship of Arsenal FC ==
In 1910, Norris and William Hall bought shares of the ailing Woolwich Arsenal (after the club had gone into voluntary liquidation) while still retaining their positions on the Fulham board; Norris became club chairman two years later. With Arsenal's low attendances and poor financial performance, Norris tried to create a London superclub by merging the two clubs, but this was blocked by the Football League. Undeterred, he turned his attention to moving Arsenal to a new stadium; he eventually settled on a site in Highbury, north London, on the site of the recreation ground of St John's College of Divinity; his close relationship with Randall Davidson helped, and the archbishop personally signed the ground's title deed. The Arsenal Stadium opened in 1913, and the club dropped the Woolwich from its name the following year.

Norris's most infamous contribution to Arsenal's history was his role in the club's promotion from the Second Division to the First in 1919. Arsenal were elected to the top flight despite finishing 6th (later amended to 5th place in 1975 after an error in the calculation of goal average was discovered) the previous season (1914–15, as competition had been suspended for most of World War I). This promotion came at the expense of other clubs, most notably Arsenal's arch-rivals Tottenham Hotspur. It has been alleged that Norris bribed or in some way unduly influenced the voting members of the Football League, in particular the league president and chairman of Liverpool, John McKenna; at a Special General Meeting of the Football League on 10 March 1919. Many sources claim that McKenna made a speech recommending Arsenal's promotion ahead of Spurs thanks to the former's longer spell in the League (Arsenal joined in 1893, Spurs in 1908), although Wolves – who finished in 4th ahead of Arsenal – had been members of the league since its inception in 1888.

Norris made one other lasting contribution to Arsenal's history. In 1925, after acrimoniously firing manager Leslie Knighton, Norris hired Huddersfield Town's Herbert Chapman as his replacement. After Norris's departure, Chapman fulfilled the chairman's ambition and turned Arsenal into the dominant side in English football in the 1930s, although later Norris cited Knighton's sacking as the only decision he ever regretted.

== Retirement ==
He largely left public life after his enforced departure from football. He died in 1934 at his home in Barnes a week after his 69th birthday, of a heart attack.

Parliament of the United Kingdom
Preceded by Constituency established	Member of Parliament for Fulham East; 1918–1922	Succeeded by Kenyon Vaughan-Morgan
Civic offices
Preceded by Robert Harris	Mayor of Fulham; 1909–1919	Succeeded by Robert Mark Gentry
