= Leonard Matters =

Australian politician in the United Kingdom

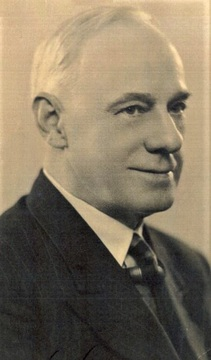

Member of Parliament for Kennington
- In office 30 May 1929 – 26 Oct 1931
- Preceded by: George Harvey
- Succeeded by: George Harvey

Personal details
- Born: 26 June 1881 Adelaide, Province of South Australia
- Died: 31 October 1951 (aged 70) Hertfordshire, United Kingdom
- Party: Labour
- Spouse: Emilie Mary Nettle (m. 1911; died 1939) Romana Kryszek (m. 1939)
- Relations: Muriel Matters (sister)
- Children: 2
- Profession: Journalist, politician

Military service
- Allegiance: Australia, British Empire
- Branch/service: Australian and Colonial Military Forces
- Years of service: 1901-1902
- Rank: Trooper
- Unit: 5th South Australian Imperial Bushmen
- Battles/wars: Boer War

Leonard Warburton Matters (26 June 1881 – 31 October 1951) was an Australian journalist who became a Labour Party politician in the United Kingdom.

== Personal life ==
He was born a British subject in Adelaide, in the Province of South Australia to parents John Leonard Matters and Emma Alma Matters (née Warburton). He is the brother to Australian-British suffragist Muriel Matters. Matters was married twice.

In 1911 Matters married Emilie Mary Domela (formerly Nettle), the widow of Ferdinand Jacobus Domela Nieuwenhuis Jr, who was the son of prominent Dutch Socialist Ferdinand Domela Nieuwenhuis; Emilie was a published author in her own right under the name 'Egeria', with her most prominent work being her 1913 work Australasians who count in London and who counts in Western Australia. Following the death of his first wife, Emilie in 1939, Matters married Romana Kryszek a Polish national who had been living in London.

Matters had two children with his first wife Emilie:

- Daughter: Mary Lenore Dunseith (née Matters)
- Step-Daughter: Emilie 'Topsy' Johanna Herbert (née Domela).

== Career ==
Matters pursued career as a journalist and writer, holding posts around the world, before finally settling in the United Kingdom. Matters wrote booklength works about the development of the Arctic trade routes in Siberia and Jack the Ripper. Matters was also part of the India League delegation sent to India to document aspects of colonial rule. These findings were later published in The Condition of India.

In 1926, Matters proposed in a magazine article that the notorious serial killer Jack the Ripper was an eminent doctor, whose son had died from syphilis caught from a prostitute. According to Matters, the doctor, given the pseudonym "Dr Stanley", committed the murders in revenge and then fled to Argentina. Matters claimed he had discovered an account of Stanley's deathbed confession in a South American newspaper. He expanded his ideas into a book, The Mystery of Jack the Ripper, in 1929.

The book was marketed as a serious study, but it contains obvious factual errors and the documents it supposedly uses as references have never been found. True crime writer Edmund Pearson, who was Matters' contemporary, said scathingly, "The deathbed confession bears about the same relation to the facts of criminology as the exploits of Peter Rabbit and Jerry Muskrat do to zoology." Ripper expert and former policeman Donald Rumbelow thought the theory was "almost certainly invented", and Stephen Knight, who wrote Jack the Ripper: The Final Solution, thought it was "based on unsupported and palpably false statements". Nevertheless, The Mystery of Jack the Ripper was the first full-length book on the Ripper, and it inspired further fictional works such as the theatre play Murder Most Foul and the film Jack the Ripper.

== Military service ==
On 28 January 1901, Matters enlisted in the Australian and Colonial Military Forces in the 5th South Australian Imperial Bushmen at the rank of Trooper.

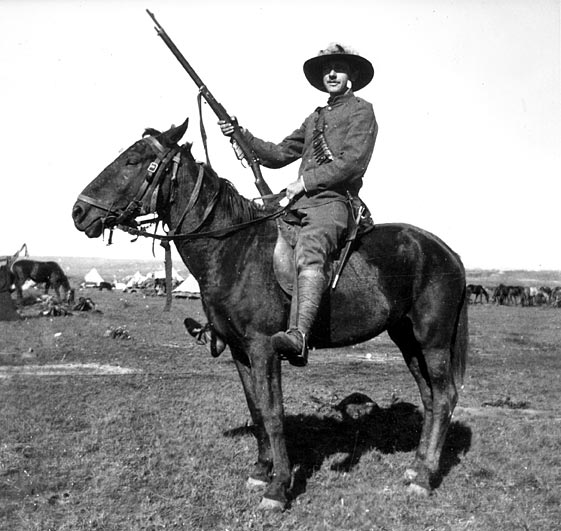
Leonard Matters in South Africa during the Boer War

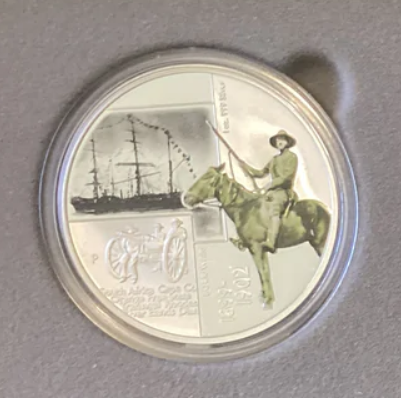
Matters Image used on the 2003 Australian's at War Coin Series

The image of Matters on horseback while on active duty was reproduced in a commemorative medallion produced by the Perth Mint in 2003 for their ‘Australians at War’ series.

== Political career ==
Matters early life and career influenced his alignment with the political plight of the working classes. During the 1924 UK General Election, he was the Labour Party campaign manager for the constituency of Hastings, where his sister Muriel Matters was running as the candidate.

In the 1929 general election, Matters was elected to the United Kingdom House of Commons as the Labour Party member of parliament (MP) for Kennington in London. Matters held the seat for two years, until his defeat at the 1931 general election, and a second unsuccessfully attempt at the 1935.

== See also ==
- Muriel Matters

Parliament of the United Kingdom
Preceded by George Harvey	Member of Parliament for Kennington; 1929–1931	Succeeded by George Harvey
