= Mark Hanbury Beaufoy =

English vinegar manufacturer and politician

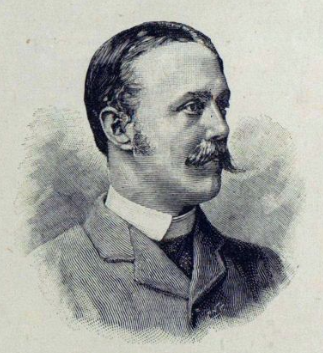
- Died: 10 November 1922
- Occupation: Politician

Mark Hanbury Beaufoy JP (21 September 1854 – 10 November 1922) was an English vinegar manufacturer and Liberal member of parliament. He wrote A Father's Advice, a famous piece of verse about gun safety.

== Background and early life ==
The son of Lieutenant Commander George Beaufoy RN (1796–1864), and the grandson of Colonel Mark Beaufoy FRS (1764–1827), Beaufoy, born in South Lambeth, London was educated at Eton and Trinity Hall, Cambridge. The Beaufoys had been vinegar makers since the 1740s, when Colonel Mark Beaufoy's father, another Mark Beaufoy (1718–1782) who was originally from Evesham, established a vinegar plant at Cuper's Gardens, on a site which later formed part of Waterloo Bridge. Despite being his father's youngest son, George Beaufoy succeeded to the vinegar works in 1851, when he retired from the Navy. The next year he married Anne Harvey, with whom he had three children. George Beaufoy died in 1864, leaving his business in trust for Beaufoy, his only son, who was then ten. By the time the business came into Beaufoy's hands, it was at number 87, South Lambeth Road, South Lambeth, having moved there in 1810.

The name Hanbury came into the Beaufoy family in 1743, when the Mark Beaufoy who founded the family firm married Elizabeth Hanbury, daughter of Capel Hanbury (died 1740) of Bristol and Pontymoile and of his wife Elizabeth Newton, an heiress.

In 1930, Gwendolyn Beaufoy published Leaves from a Beech Tree, a history of the Beaufoy family.

== Career ==
Beaufoy supported the introduction of the eight-hour day for all employees and introduced it in his own vinegar works at Lambeth. In 1881, he chaired a meeting which founded the Church of England Central Society for Providing Homes for Waifs and Strays, later renamed the Church of England Children's Society, and now known as The Children's Society. The object of the new organisation was "to rescue and care for children who are orphaned, homeless, cruelly treated or in moral danger, and to relieve over-burdened homes".

A Liberal in politics, Beaufoy was elected as member of parliament for the Kennington division of the Metropolitan Borough of Lambeth at a by-election on 15 March 1889 and was re-elected at the general election of 1892, holding the seat until 1895. He was also a Justice of the Peace.

Beaufoy continued his family's support of the City of London School. He also founded the Beaufoy Institute in Black Prince Road, Lambeth (later taken over by the London County Council), to replace a 'ragged school' established by the Beaufoys before 1870. A stone plaque on the Beaufoy Institute reads: "This principal stone was laid by Mildred Scott Beaufoy wife of Mark Hanbury Beaufoy, Chairman of Governors, 21 February 1907. F. A. Powell Architect, Sculpt Nixon".

== Football ==
In his youth Beaufoy was an amateur association football player, usually in position of outside right. He had played for Eton College and Cambridge University (although not as a 'Blue' in matches against Oxford).

After university he played for the Old Etonians F.C., his most distinguished match being the 1879 FA Cup Final at Kennington Oval when the Old Etonians beat Clapham Rovers 1–0. At different times he ironically played for Clapham Rovers outside of the FA Cup ties when both clubs were rival competitors.

He played in county matches for Surrey.

== Shooting ==
Beaufoy began to shoot at the age of twenty and became an enthusiast for game shooting, preferring quality of game to quantity. He had his own shoot at Coombe House, near Shaftesbury, in the border country of Wiltshire and Dorset, consisting of about fifteen hundred acres, plus another five hundred which he rented. The land was ideal for pheasant shooting. Beaufoy also ran a second shoot at Ashmore in Dorset.

Throughout the English-speaking world, shooting people are familiar with Beaufoy's verses on gun safety called A Father's Advice. These begin:

"If a sportsman true you'd be
Listen carefully to me:
Never, never, let your gun
Pointed be at anyone..."

Beaufoy had written the verses by Christmas, 1902, when they were given to his fifteen-year-old eldest son, Henry Mark Beaufoy, together with his first gun, a 28-bore. A hundred copies of the verses were printed and given to friends. A Father's Advice quickly became well known in shooting circles, but it was not always credited to Beaufoy.

The verses appeared in many different publications, sometimes with Beaufoy's permission, more often without it. Gun-makers began to send A Father's Advice out with their cartridges, and a gamekeeper offered the verses to a Sussex magazine, claiming to have written them. It was sometimes said they were by an officer killed in the Boer war, and in a letter to The Sporting Times they were attributed to the Reverend J. L. Browne, an Eastbourne headmaster. Browne replied to say they were not his, and in November 1910 Beaufoy himself wrote in to say he was the author, adding "Perhaps they have not been wholly useless – if so, I am amply rewarded".

The verses were highly thought of on the royal shooting estate at Sandringham, and A. S. Gaye translated them into Latin.

== Kennel Club ==
As a young man, Beaufoy kept mastiffs and bloodhounds and between 1920 and his death in 1922 he served as chairman of The Kennel Club.

== Marriage and children ==
In 1884, Beaufoy married Mildred Scott Tait, daughter of Robert Tait. They had one daughter, Margaret Hilda (born 1885) and three sons, Henry Mark (1887), George Maurice (1893), and Robert Harvey (1895). Henry Mark Beaufoy, later of Hill House, Steeple Aston in Oxfordshire, became High Sheriff of Oxfordshire in 1944. The youngest son, Robert, lost his left arm during the First World War, but continued with his shooting, going on to become a good one-armed shot. The middle son, George Maurice Beaufoy, was killed on 10 May 1941 when a bomb fell on the family vinegar yard in Lambeth during the Second World War. He was the last of the Beaufoys to manage the business.

== Honours (civic) ==
- High Sheriff of Wiltshire, 1900

The Beaufoy Institute in London is named after him.

== Honours (sports) ==
Old Etonians F.C.

1879 F.A. Cup Final (winner).

== Notes and references ==
The Dispossessed: An Aspect of Victorian Social History by Barbara Kerr (1974, John Baker, London) ISBN 0-212-97008-9 discusses the related Thornhill & Beaufoy families and the social changes in Victorian England following the industrial revolution.

Parliament of the United Kingdom
Preceded by Robert Gent-Davis	Member of Parliament for Kennington; 1889 – 1895	Succeeded by Sir Frederick Cook, Bt.
