= Francis Capel Harrison =

British politician (1863–1938)

Francis Capel Harrison CSI (21 June 1863 – 10 September 1938) was a British civil servant and Conservative Party politician.

The second son of Edward Francis Harrison of the Indian Civil Service (ICS), he was educated at Rugby School and Balliol College, Oxford. He entered the ICS in 1884, initially serving in the Executive in Bengal, after five years he moved to the financial department in Calcutta. He rose to be Comptroller, Auditor-General, and Head Commissioner of Paper Currency. He was made a Companion of the Star of India in 1909. He retired and returned to the United Kingdom in 1911.

He entered politics in 1916 when he was co-opted onto the London County Council to fill a Municipal Reform Party vacancy on the aldermanic bench in place of Cyril Jackson, who had resigned. He served until 1922. The Municipal Reformers were the majority party on the council, closely allied to the national Conservative Party. Harrison was appointed chairman of the council's finance committee, but resigned the position in March 1922 as he disagreed with his party over "the matter of economy". He condemned the council for what he called "excessive expenditure on housing and in other directions". Following his resignation he authored an article in The Times calling for the government to make deep cuts in spending.

At the 1922 general election he was elected as Conservative Party Member of Parliament for Lambeth, Kennington. He was also supported by the Anti-Waste League. He stood down from parliament when a further general election was held in 1923.

One of 12 children, Harrison's siblings included the inventor and industrialist Herbert C. Harrison. He never married and died at his home, "White Hall", Syderstone, Norfolk, in 1938, aged 75.

Parliament of the United Kingdom
Preceded by Henry Purchase	Member of Parliament for Kennington; 1922–1923	Succeeded by Thomas Williams
