= Fulham East =

Parliamentary constituency in the United Kingdom, 1918–1955

- Former borough constituency for the House of Commons
- County: Metropolitan Borough of Fulham (in the County of London)

1918–1955
- Seats: One
- Created from: Fulham
- Replaced by: Fulham

Fulham East was a borough constituency in the Metropolitan Borough of Fulham in London. It was represented in the House of Commons of the Parliament of the United Kingdom from 1918 to 1955. Elections were held using the first-past-the-post voting system.

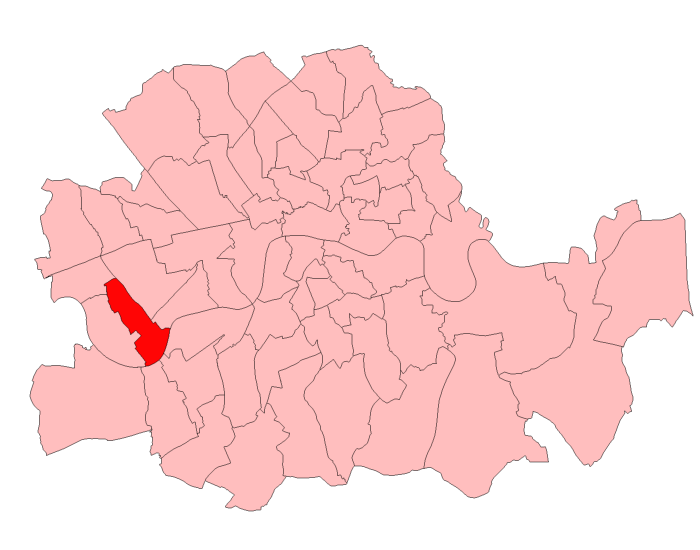
Fulham East in the County of London, boundaries 1918-50

A map showing the wards of Fulham Metropolitan Borough as they appeared in 1916.

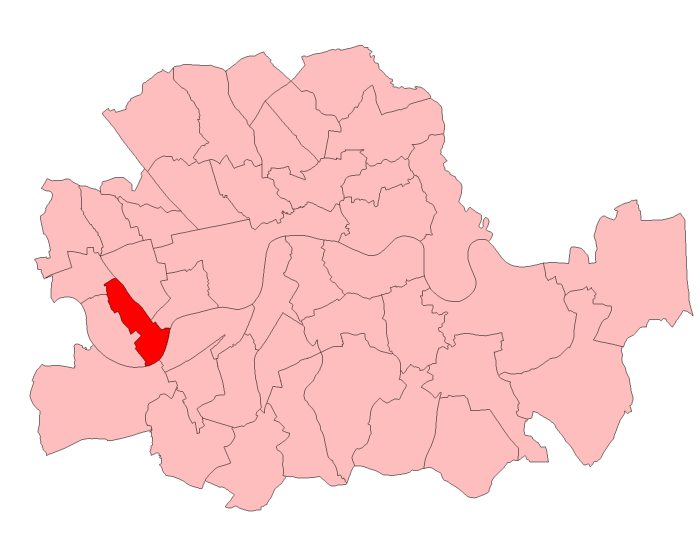
Fulham East in the County of London, boundaries 1950-55

At the 1918 general election the previous Fulham constituency was divided into two constituencies, Fulham East and Fulham West; the two halves were re-united for the 1955 general election. At the 1997 general election, the Fulham constituency was replaced by Hammersmith and Fulham.

== Boundaries ==
The Metropolitan Borough of Fulham wards of Barons Court, Lillie, Sands End, and Walham.

== Members of Parliament ==
Election	Member	Party
1918	Henry Norris	Unionist
1922	Kenyon Vaughan-Morgan	Unionist
1933 b-e	John Wilmot	Labour
1935	William Astor	Conservative
1945	Michael Stewart	Labour
1955	constituency abolished: see Fulham	

== Election results ==
=== Election in the 1910s ===
General election 1918: Fulham East
Party		Candidate	Votes	%	±%
C	Unionist	Henry Norris	10,242	69.4	
	Independent Labour	David Cook	2,883	19.5	
	Liberal	Frederick L. Coysh	1,644	11.1	
Majority			7,359	49.9	
Turnout			14,769	40.8	
Registered electors			36,228		
	Unionist win (new seat)				
C indicates candidate endorsed by the coalition government.

=== Election in the 1920s ===
General election 1922: Fulham East
Party	Candidate	Votes	%	±%
Unionist	Kenyon Vaughan-Morgan	13,282	61.5	−7.9
Labour	John Palmer	5,393	25.0	New
Liberal	Maurice Gordon Liverman	2,907	13.5	+2.4
Majority		7,889	36.5	−13.4
Turnout		21,582	58.0	+17.2
Registered electors		37,180		
Unionist hold		Swing	−5.2	

General election 1923: Fulham East
Party	Candidate	Votes	%	±%
Unionist	Kenyon Vaughan-Morgan	9,757	43.9	−17.6
Labour	John Palmer	7,683	34.5	+9.5
Liberal	Robert Crawford Hawkin	4,817	21.6	+8.1
Majority		2,074	9.4	−27.1
Turnout		22,257	58.0	0.0
Registered electors		38,403		
Unionist hold		Swing	−13.6	

General election 1924: Fulham East
Party	Candidate	Votes	%	±%
Unionist	Kenyon Vaughan-Morgan	16,657	61.6	+17.7
Labour	John Palmer	10,403	38.4	+3.9
Majority		6,254	23.2	+13.8
Turnout		27,060	69.1	+11.1
Registered electors		39,151		
Unionist hold		Swing	+6.9	

General election 1929: Fulham East
Party	Candidate	Votes	%	±%
Unionist	Kenyon Vaughan-Morgan	15,130	44.3	−17.3
Labour	John Palmer	13,425	39.4	+1.0
Liberal	John Henry Greenwood	5,551	16.3	New
Majority		1,705	4.9	−18.3
Turnout		34,106	66.8	−2.3
Registered electors		51,066		
Unionist hold		Swing	−9.2	

=== Election in the 1930s ===
General election 1931: Fulham East
Party	Candidate	Votes	%	±%
Conservative	Kenyon Vaughan-Morgan	23,438	68.7	+14.4
Labour	John Maynard	8,917	26.1	−13.3
Liberal	John Henry Greenwood	1,788	5.2	−11.1
Majority		14,521	42.6	+37.7
Turnout		34,143	66.1	−0.5
Conservative hold		Swing		

1933 Fulham East by-election
Party	Candidate	Votes	%	±%
Labour	John Wilmot	17,790	57.9	+31.8
Conservative	William James Waldron	12,950	42.1	−26.6
Majority		4,840	15.8	N/A
Turnout		30,740	59.5	−7.6
Labour gain from Conservative		Swing	+29.2	

General election 1935: Fulham East
Party	Candidate	Votes	%	±%
Conservative	William Astor	18,743	51.4	−16.3
Labour	John Wilmot	17,689	48.6	+22.5
Majority		1,054	2.8	N/A
Turnout		37,433	71.9	+5.8
Conservative gain from Labour		Swing		

=== Election in the 1940s ===
General election 1945: Fulham East
Party	Candidate	Votes	%	±%
Labour	Michael Stewart	15,662	55.4	+6.8
Conservative	William Astor	10,309	36.4	−15.0
Liberal	Philip Montague Syrett	2,315	8.2	New
Majority		5,353	19.0	N/A
Turnout		28,286		
Labour gain from Conservative		Swing		

=== Elections in the 1950s ===
General election 1950: Fulham East
Party	Candidate	Votes	%	±%
Labour	Michael Stewart	18,998	50.1	−5.3
Conservative	Vyvyan Adams	16,233	42.9	+6.5
Liberal	Frank Victor Jacoby	2,214	5.9	−2.3
Communist	Roy Ellwood Elsmere	399	1.1	New
Majority		2,765	7.2	−11.8
Turnout		37,764	84.2	
Labour hold		Swing		

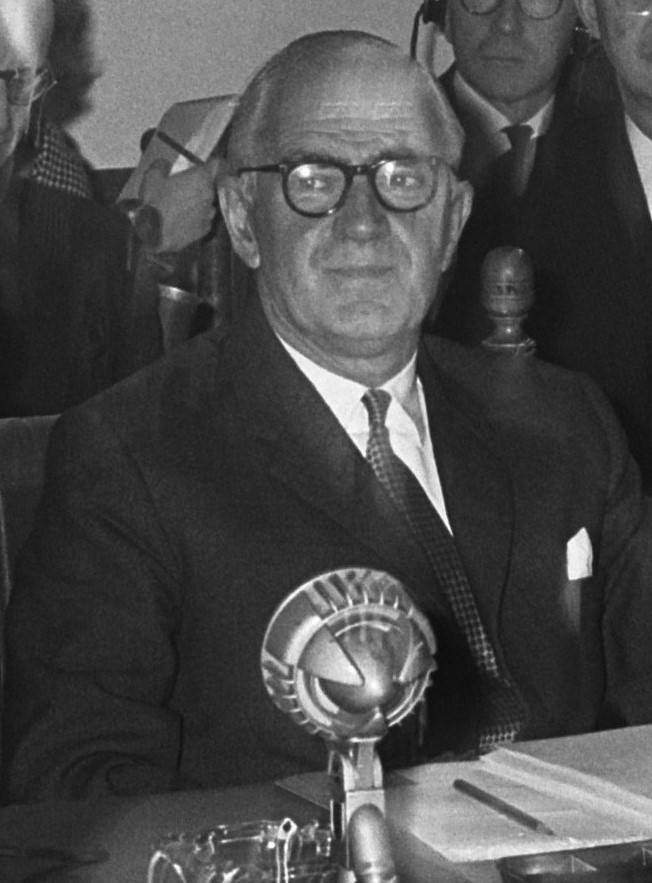
Michael Stewart

General election 1951: Fulham East
Party	Candidate	Votes	%	±%
Labour	Michael Stewart	20,279	53.2	+3.1
Conservative	John Hall	17,806	46.8	+3.9
Majority		2,473	6.4	−0.8
Turnout		38,085	84.5	+0.3
Labour hold		Swing		
