= Henry Purchase =

British politician

Member of Parliament for Kennington
- In office 14 December 1918 – 26 October 1922
- Preceded by: Sir Stephen Collins
- Succeeded by: Francis Capel Harrison

Personal details
- Born: 1873
- Died: 14 September 1945 (aged 71–72)
- Party: Liberal
- Spouse: Kathleen Roberts (m. 1902; died 1910)

Henry George Purchase (1873 – 14 September 1945) was an English barrister and Liberal politician.

== Family and education ==
Henry George Purchase was the son of George and Victoria Purchase of Weymouth in Dorset He was educated at King's College, London where he received the law degree, LL.B. In 1902, he married Kathleen Roberts the daughter of a Justice of the Peace from Hollybrook in County Cork. His wife died in 1910 and they do not appear to have had any children.

== Career ==
Following his university degree, Purchase took further law examinations and in 1913 he was called to the bar at the Middle Temple. He then joined the Northern Circuit, localised at Liverpool and later acquired the degree of Doctor of Law from London University.

During the Great War Purchase performed various public tasks. In 1915, he was sent on a special mission to France for the purpose of organising a British and American hospital at Neuilly. In 1917 he took a post in the enforcement branch of the Ministry of Food in London and was shortly afterwards made an assistant director of the Ministry.

== Politics ==
=== 1918 ===
Sir Stephen Collins, the Liberal MP for Kennington in Lambeth since 1906 decided not to contest the seat at the 1918 general election, perhaps because at the age of 71 he felt it was time to stand down. This left a vacancy and Purchase was selected to fight the seat for the Liberals. Purchase stood as a supporter of the Coalition government of David Lloyd George. Purchase had the advantage of the Coalition coupon over the Unionist, Colonel Francis Alfred Lucas, the former MP for Lowestoft who had fought the seat in the general elections of January and December 1910. However Lucas died before polling day, invalidating the poll and the election in Kennington had to be run as a separate event about a fortnight after all other polling on 20 December 1918.

Purchase faced two opponents, for the Unionists, Alice Theresa Lucas who as hospital chairperson and the widow of Col. Lucas was chosen thus giving the Conservative Party its first woman candidate in a Parliamentary election. Mr William Glennie fought the seat for the Labour Party. Purchase had the 'coupon' and he had a telegram of support from Lloyd George. Despite the novelty of Mrs Lucas' candidacy, the election seems to have been a lacklustre affair. The Times newspaper reported on polling day that '....very little interest is being taken in the contest and a visitor to the constituency would have difficulty in knowing that an election is in progress.'

Purchase held the seat for the Liberals and the Coalition with a majority of 1,132 votes and 42% of the poll, Mrs Lucas polled 32% and Glennie came third with 25%. Although this was a good majority compared with the 55 votes by which Sir Stephen Collins had defeated Colonel Lucas in December 1910, it was perhaps closer than some commentators anticipated, given the landslide for the Coalition which had taken place overall. One historian has written of Mrs Lucas' result that she was 'probably the first woman to discover that there is nothing like bereavement, injury or childbirth to commend a candidate to the British electorate.'

=== Government office ===
Following his attachment as Assistant Director to the Ministry of Food in 1918, in its Enforcement Branch, Purchase was appointed Parliamentary Private Secretary to the Chairman of the National Insurance Joint Committee in 1919. He also served as Hon. Secretary to Coastwise Traffic Parliamentary Committee and was a member of the Ecclesiastical Committee of the Lords and Commons.

=== 1922-1935 ===
Purchase defended his seat at the 1922 general election as a Lloyd George National Liberal against Labour and Conservative opponents. In a reversal of fortune from 1918, Purchase found himself at the bottom of the poll with just 16.6% of the votes cast. The seat was won for the Tories by Francis Capel Harrison with a majority of 2,411 votes.

Purchase made regular attempts to get back into the House of Commons. He stood as Liberal candidate in Kidderminster in 1923 and in the same seat in 1924. He then contested Leicester South in 1929, Gainsborough in 1931 and finally Blackpool in 1935 - all without success.

=== Other appointments ===
In 1899, Purchase had been appointed as one of the Hon Secretaries to the Tercentenary Celebration of the birth of Oliver Cromwell. As well as commemorating the anniversary of Cromwell's birth at an event in the City Temple on 25 April 1899, and arranging for the erection of a statue of Cromwell in the grounds of the Houses of Parliament, the Tercentenary Committee also set up a fund for various charitable projects including improvements to Huntingdon Grammar School where Cromwell was educated. But donations were also made to other good causes. In November 1899, the former Liberal prime minister, Lord Rosebery was the leading speaker at a commemorative meeting which raised money for the Prince of Wales's Hospital Fund.

The following year Purchase became an Assistant Secretary of the New Reform Club, a club founded in 1900 as a social rallying point for what was then called ‘advanced Liberal organisations’ (that is those supporting radical policies such as those embodied in the Newcastle Programme), although it harked back to more traditional Liberal approaches in its desire to bring about ‘peace, retrenchment and reform’ in the footsteps of the plans for the original Reform Club. Robert Reid MP was the Club's first president. Purchase operated as Secretary from the Club's premises in St Ermine's Mansions in Westminster.

Purchase also furthered his political ambitions by becoming the Secretary to the Committee of London Liberal MPs in which capacity he served from 1918–1922 and in 1930 he was a member of the Bar delegation to Canada and the United States.

== Publications ==
In 1931, Purchase produced a legal text book, The Law relating to Documents of Title to Goods, published by Sweet & Maxwell Ltd.

Parliament of the United Kingdom
Preceded by Sir Stephen Collins	Member of Parliament for Kennington; 1918–1922	Succeeded by Francis Capel Harrison
