= Kennington (UK Parliament constituency) =

Parliamentary constituency in the United Kingdom, 1885–1950

- Former borough constituency for the House of Commons

1885–1950
- Seats: one
- Created from: Lambeth
- Replaced by: Vauxhall and Brixton

Kennington was a borough constituency centred on the Kennington district of South London. It returned one Member of Parliament (MP) to the House of Commons of the Parliament of the United Kingdom.

The constituency was created for the 1885 general election, and abolished for the 1950 general election.

In 1918 Alice Theresa Lucas became the first woman to stand as a Conservative Party candidate. She took 32.2% of the vote and came second to the Liberal candidate Henry Purchase. She would have been the first woman MP if she had been elected.

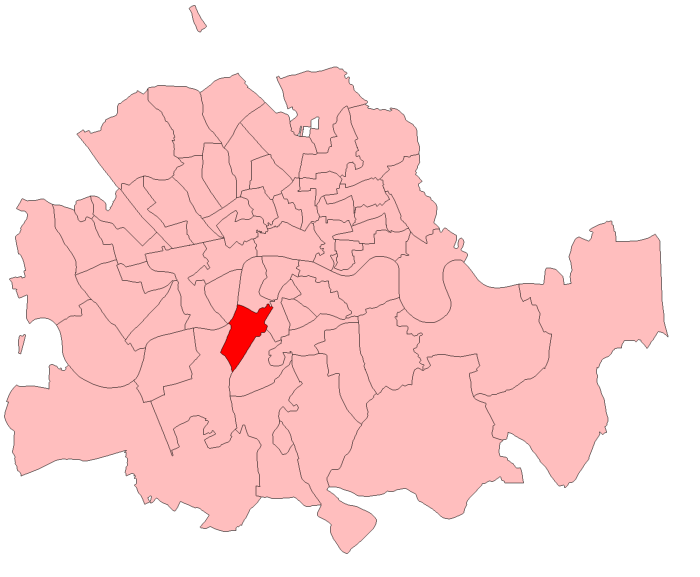
Kennington in London 1885–1918

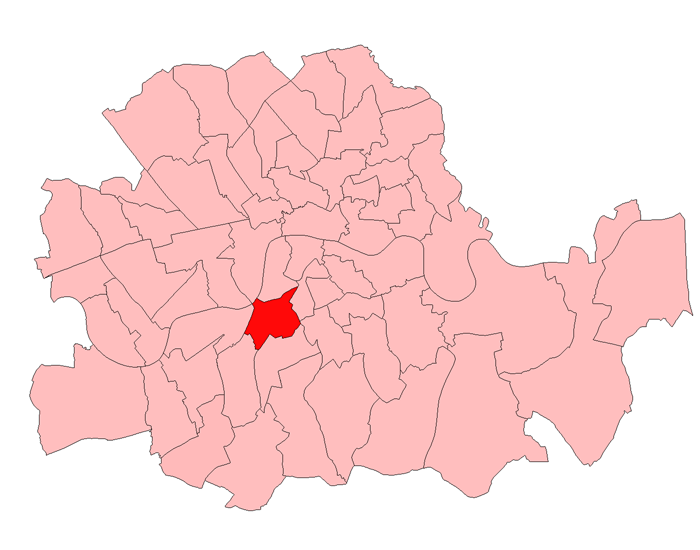
Kennington in London 1918–50

== Members of Parliament ==
Election	Member	Party
1885	Robert Gent-Davis	Conservative
1889	Mark Hanbury Beaufoy	Liberal
1895	Sir Frederick Cook	Conservative
1906	Sir Stephen Collins	Liberal
1918	Henry Purchase	Coalition Liberal
1922	Francis Capel Harrison	Conservative
1923	Thomas Williams	Labour
1924	George Harvey	Unionist
1929	Leonard Matters	Labour
1931	Sir George Harvey	Conservative
1939	John Wilmot	Labour
1945	Charles Gibson	Labour
1950	constituency abolished	

== Election results ==
=== Elections in the 1940s ===
General election 1945: Lambeth, Kennington
Party	Candidate	Votes	%	±%
Labour	Charles Gibson	12,910	70.2	+10.1
Conservative	S.H. Stanley	5,471	29.8	−10.1
Majority		7,439	40.4	+20.2
Turnout		18,381	62.2	+11.6
Labour gain from Conservative		Swing		

=== Elections in the 1930s ===
1939 Kennington by-election: Lambeth, Kennington
Party	Candidate	Votes	%	±%
Labour	John Wilmot	10,715	60.1	+11.2
Conservative	A. Kennedy	7,119	39.9	−11.2
Majority		3,596	20.2	N/A
Turnout		17,834	40.6	−15.1
Labour gain from Conservative		Swing		

General election 1935: Lambeth, Kennington
Party	Candidate	Votes	%	±%
Conservative	George Harvey	12,401	51.1	−13.2
Labour	Leonard Matters	11,856	48.9	+13.2
Majority		545	2.2	−26.4
Turnout		24,257	55.7	−5.6
Conservative hold		Swing		

General election 1931: Lambeth, Kennington
Party	Candidate	Votes	%	±%
Conservative	George Harvey	18,371	64.3	+20.0
Labour	Leonard Matters	10,188	35.7	−20.0
Majority		8,183	28.6	N/A
Turnout		28,559	61.3	+1.2
Conservative gain from Labour		Swing		

=== Elections in the 1920s ===
General election 1929: Kennington
Party	Candidate	Votes	%	±%
Labour	Leonard Matters	15,477	55.7	+12.0
Unionist	George Harvey	12,328	44.3	−12.0
Majority		3,149	11.4	N/A
Turnout		27,805	60.1	−10.2
Registered electors		46,290		
Labour gain from Unionist		Swing	+12.0	

General election 1924: Lambeth, Kennington
Party	Candidate	Votes	%	±%
Unionist	George Harvey	14,898	56.3	+19.5
Labour	Thomas Williams	11,572	43.7	+4.5
Majority		3,326	12.6	N/A
Turnout		26,470	70.3	+12.7
Registered electors		37,629		
Unionist gain from Labour		Swing	+7.5	

Jacobsen

General election 1923: Kennington
Party	Candidate	Votes	%	±%
Labour	Thomas Williams	8,292	39.2	+3.1
Unionist	Reginald Blair	7,782	36.8	−10.5
Liberal	Thomas Owen Jacobsen	5,075	24.0	+7.4
Majority		510	2.4	N/A
Turnout		21,149	57.6	−0.8
Registered electors		36,729		
Labour gain from Unionist		Swing	+6.8	

Gosling

General election 1922: Kennington
Party	Candidate	Votes	%	±%
Unionist	Francis Harrison	10,081	47.3	+15.1
Labour	Harry Gosling	7,670	36.1	+10.7
National Liberal	Henry Purchase	3,522	16.6	−25.8
Majority		2,411	11.2	N/A
Turnout		21,273	58.4	+28.7
Registered electors		36,451		
Unionist gain from Liberal		Swing	+20.5	

=== Elections in the 1910s ===
Purchase

General election 1918: Kennington
Party		Candidate	Votes	%	±%
C	Liberal	Henry Purchase	4,705	42.4	−5.2
	Unionist	Alice Lucas	3,573	32.2	−14.7
	Labour	William Glennie	2,817	25.4	New
Majority			1,132	10.2	+9.5
Turnout			11,095	29.7	−44.5
Registered electors			37,322		
	Liberal hold		Swing	+4.8	
C indicates candidate endorsed by the coalition government.

Collins

General election December 1910: Lambeth, Kennington
Party	Candidate	Votes	%	±%
Liberal	Stephen Collins	3,565	47.6	−4.7
Conservative	Francis Lucas	3,510	46.9	−0.8
Independent Labour	Victor Grayson	408	5.5	New
Majority		55	0.7	−3.9
Turnout		7,483	74.2	−6.2
Registered electors		10,088		
Liberal hold		Swing	−2.0	

General election January 1910: Lambeth, Kennington
Party	Candidate	Votes	%	±%
Liberal	Stephen Collins	4,246	52.3	−8.0
Conservative	Francis Lucas	3,865	47.7	+8.0
Majority		381	4.6	−16.0
Turnout		8,111	80.4	+6.3
Registered electors		10,088		
Liberal hold		Swing	-8.0	

=== Elections in the 1900s ===
Collins

General election 1906: Lambeth, Kennington
Party	Candidate	Votes	%	±%
Liberal	Stephen Collins	4,639	60.3	+24.8
Conservative	Frederick Cook	3,054	39.7	−24.8
Majority		1,585	20.6	N/A
Turnout		7,693	74.1	+11.8
Registered electors		10,382		
Liberal gain from Conservative		Swing	+24.8	

General election 1900: Lambeth, Kennington
Party	Candidate	Votes	%	±%
Conservative	Frederick Cook	4,195	64.5	+12.7
Liberal	Walter Essex	2,309	35.5	−2.6
Majority		1,886	29.0	+15.3
Turnout		6,504	62.3	−9.5
Registered electors		10,432		
Conservative hold		Swing	+7.7	

=== Elections in the 1890s ===
General election 1895: Lambeth, Kennington
Party	Candidate	Votes	%	±%
Conservative	Frederick Cook	3,764	51.8	+6.1
Liberal	Mark Beaufoy	2,769	38.1	−16.2
Independent Liberal	William Wightman	730	10.1	New
Majority		995	13.7	N/A
Turnout		7,263	71.8	−4.3
Registered electors		10,117		
Conservative gain from Liberal		Swing	+11.2	

General election 1892: Lambeth, Kennington
Party	Candidate	Votes	%	±%
Liberal	Mark Beaufoy	3,860	54.3	+7.9
Conservative	Ferdinand Begg	3,253	45.7	−7.9
Majority		607	8.6	N/A
Turnout		7,113	76.1	+3.8
Registered electors		9,348		
Liberal gain from Conservative		Swing	+7.9	

=== Elections in the 1880s ===
By-election, 15 Mar 1889: Kennington
Party	Candidate	Votes	%	±%
Liberal	Mark Hanbury Beaufoy	4,069	54.2	+7.8
Conservative	Philip Beresford-Hope	3,439	45.8	−7.8
Majority		630	8.4	N/A
Turnout		7,508	84.2	+11.9
Registered electors		8,920		
Liberal gain from Conservative		Swing	+7.8	

General election 1886: Lambeth, Kennington
Party	Candidate	Votes	%	±%
Conservative	Robert Gent-Davis	3,222	53.6	+1.0
Liberal	Mark Hanbury Beaufoy	2,792	46.4	−0.5
Majority		430	7.2	+1.5
Turnout		6,014	72.3	−4.4
Registered electors		8,313		
Conservative hold		Swing	+0.8	

General election 1885: Lambeth, Kennington
Party	Candidate	Votes	%	±%
Conservative	Robert Gent-Davis	3,351	52.6	
Liberal	John O'Connor Power	2,991	46.9	
Social Democratic Federation	John Fielding	32	0.5	
Majority		360	5.7	
Turnout		6,374	76.7	
Registered electors		8,313		
Conservative win (new seat)				
