= Kenyon Vaughan-Morgan =

British politician

Vaughan-Morgan in 1923

Lieutenant-Colonel Sir Kenyon Pascoe Vaughan-Morgan OBE (27 October 1873 – 21 August 1933) was a British military officer and politician, who served as the Conservative Member of Parliament for Fulham East from 1922 until his death.

Vaughan-Morgan was educated at Charterhouse School, and then studied abroad in France and Germany. He joined the family firm, the Morgan Crucible Company in Battersea, and rose to become director and vice-chairman. He married Muriel Collett in 1897; the two had three children.

Following the outbreak of the First World War, Vaughan-Morgan was commissioned in the Royal Army Service Corps in 1915, with a temporary commission as a lieutenant dating from 13 January 1915. He became a member of the General Staff at the War Office in 1917, and retired in 1919 as a lieutenant-colonel. Following the war, he became the honorary colonel of the 64th Field Brigade RA in the Territorial Army.

In the 1922 United Kingdom general election he was elected to the House of Commons for Fulham East as a Conservative. He held the seat until his death in 1933 aged 59, when it was taken by Labour in a dramatic swing against the Government.

Vaughan-Morgan was active in civic affairs in London, and was a deputy lieutenant for the county in 1928. He was also chair of the London Municipal Society, a governor of St Thomas' and St Barts' hospitals, and a commissioner for income tax.

Vaughan-Morgan's son John Vaughan-Morgan also entered politics, serving as a Conservative MP and later peer. One uncle, Sir Walter Morgan, was Lord Mayor of London, and another, Octavius Vaughan Morgan, was a Liberal MP for Battersea.

Parliament of the United Kingdom
Preceded by Henry Norris	Member of Parliament for Fulham East; 1922–1933	Succeeded by John Wilmot
