= 1939 Kennington by-election =

UK by-election

The 1939 Kennington by-election was a parliamentary by-election held on 24 May 1939 for the British House of Commons constituency of Kennington. The Labour Party gained the seat from the Conservative Party.

== Result ==
Kennington by-election, 1939
Party	Candidate	Votes	%	±%
Labour	John Wilmot	10,715	60.1	+11.2
Conservative	A. Kennedy	7,119	39.9	−11.2
Majority		3,596	20.2	N/A
Turnout		17,834	40.6	−15.1
Labour gain from Conservative		Swing		

== Aftermath ==
In the 1945 general election,

General election, 5 July 1945
Party	Candidate	Votes	%	±%
Labour	Charles Gibson	12,910	70.2	+10.1
Conservative	S. H. Stanley	5,471	29.8	−10.1
Majority		7,439	40.4	+20.2
Turnout		18,381	62.2	+11.6
Labour gain from Conservative		Swing		
