= Illegal handbill =

Sometimes followed by another word, such as poster or posting, an illegal handbill is one that violates laws or codes regarding use of a public place to advertise.

A handbill includes any sign, notice, placard, poster, paper, advertising circular, sticker, card, leaflet, or other similar item calculated to attract the attention of the public.

== Examples of restrictions ==
Although the precise wording may vary from place to place, an example of applicable regulations is:

- "No person shall post, affix, ... attach ... upon any street lamp, street sign, ... utility poll ...

== Enforcement ==
- Fines
- Combatting posters for upcoming events by marking them CANCELLED
- have government workers tear them down
- Business loss

== Legal alternative ==
- Permitting posting on a limited basis, e.g. bulletin boards provides another outlet for the distribution of the information.
- Unity - "Workshop to Create Single Handbill"

== See also ==
- Guerrilla marketing
- Martin v. City of Struthers
