= Stephen Collins (politician) =

Stephen Collins (published in the Illustrated London News)

Sir Stephen Collins (9 October 1847 – 12 March 1925) was a British Liberal Party politician.

The son of William Collins of Swanage, Dorset, Collins moved to London where he became involved in local politics and was a leading member of the temperance movement. He was twice married: in 1872 to Frances Ann Webber, and following her death to Jane Russell of Marsworth, Hertfordshire in 1901.

== Politics ==
A member of the Wandsworth District Board he was subsequently elected to represent Kennington on the London County Council and became an alderman on Lambeth Borough Council.

In 1906 he was elected as Liberal MP for Kennington. He held the seat until 1918. He received a knighthood in the 1913 Birthday Honours.

== Temperance activities ==
Collins was a member of the Congregationalist Church and a life-long abstainer from alcohol. He was involved in various temperance organisations including the National Temperance League, the Good Templars, the Rechabites and the Band of Hope.

He died at his home, Elm House, Tring, Hertfordshire.

Parliament of the United Kingdom
Preceded by Sir Frederick Cook	Member of Parliament for Lambeth, Kennington; 1906–1918	Succeeded by Henry Purchase
