= Nathan (surname) =

Nathan is a surname. It is derived from the Hebrew verb נתן meaning gave (standard Hebrew Natan, Yiddish Nussen or Nosson, Tiberian Hebrew Nāṯān). The meaning of the name in Jewish culture could be rendered "he has given" or "he will give".

== People with this surname ==
- Abie Nathan (1927–2008), Israeli humanist and peace activist
- Barnett Nathan (1793–1856), English impresario and entertainer
- Baron Nathan, a title in the Peerage of the United Kingdom, created in 1940
  - Harry Nathan, 1st Baron Nathan (1889–1963)
  - Roger Nathan, 2nd Baron Nathan (1922–2007)
  - Rupert Nathan, 3rd Baron Nathan (born 1957)
- Clemens Nathan (1933–2015), British humanitarian
- DeDee Nathan (born 1968), American heptathlete
- Elias Salomon Nathan (1807–1862), German writer and physician
- Ernesto Nathan (1848–1921), English-Italian politician and mayor of Rome (1907–1913)
- George Nathan (1895–1937), British volunteer and battalion commander in the International Brigades
- George Jean Nathan (1888 – 1958) American critic and editor
- Henry Nathan Jr. (1842–1914), Canadian politician
- Isaac Nathan ben Kalonymus (14th-15th century), French philosopher and rabbi
- Isaac Nathan (c. 1792–1864), English-Australian musician
- Janet Nathan (1938–2020), British visual artist
- Jerrold Nathan Reginald Jerrold-Nathan (1889–1979), Australian painter
- Joe Nathan (born 1974), American baseball player
- John Nathan (born 1940), American professor of Japanese
- Juanita Nathan, Canadian politician
- Manfred Nathan (1875–1945) South African lawyer, judge, and writer.
- Matthew Nathan (1862–1939), governor of Hong Kong (1904–1907)
- Maud Nathan (1862–1946), American social worker, labor activist and suffragist
- Micah Nathan (born 1973), American author
- Michelle Vicki Nathan (born 1950), birth name of the British actress Vicki Michelle
- Pareaute Nathan, New Zealand Māori educator and weaver
- P.S. Nathan (1891–1976), Indian natural history specimen dealer
- Robert Nathan (1894–1985), American novelist and poet
- Robert Nathan (intelligence officer) (1868–1921), British intelligence official active in India and the United States
- Robert R. Nathan (1908–2001), American economist
- Robert Stuart Nathan (born 1948), American television writer and producer
- Sara Nathan (broadcaster) (born 1956), English broadcaster
- Sara Nathan (journalist) (born 1974), English journalist
- Sellapan Ramanathan (1924–2016), 6th President of Singapore (1999–2011), often known as S R Nathan
- Syd Nathan (1904–1968), American music business executive
- Tonie Nathan (1923–2014), American politician
- Tony Nathan (born 1956), American football coach

== Fictional characters ==
- Gloria Nathan, a Latin American doctor at HBO drama Oz

== See also ==
- Nathan (given name)
- Nathan (disambiguation) (places and other meanings)
- Netanyahu as in Benzion and Benjamin Netanyahu (Nathan + Yahu)
