= 1937 Wandsworth Central by-election =

UK Parliamentary by-election

← 1935	29 April 1937	1940 →

Constituency of Wandsworth Central
- Turnout: 63.2% (▼1.8%)
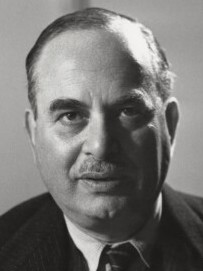
	First party	Second party
		Con
Candidate	Harry Nathan	Roland Jennings
Party	Labour	Conservative
Popular vote	12,406	11,921
Percentage	51.0%	49.0%
Swing	▲9.6%	▼9.6%
MP before election
Henry Jackson
Conservative
Subsequent MP
Harry Nathan
Labour

The 1937 Wandsworth Central by-election was held on 29 April 1937. The by-election was held due to the death of the incumbent Conservative MP, Henry Jackson. It was won by the Labour candidate Harry Nathan.

By-Election 29 April 1937: Wandsworth Central
Party	Candidate	Votes	%	±%
Labour	Harry Nathan	12,406	51.0	+9.6
Conservative	Roland Jennings	11,921	49.0	−9.6
Majority		485	2.0	N/A
Turnout		24,327	63.2	−1.8
Registered electors		38,478		
Labour gain from Conservative		Swing	+9.60	
