= Butt baronets =

Extinct baronetcy in the Baronetage of the United Kingdom

The Butt Baronetcy, of Westminster in the County of London, was a title in the Baronetage of the United Kingdom. It was created on 25 July 1929 for Sir Alfred Butt, who represented Balham and Tooting in the House of Commons as a Unionist between 1922 and 1936. The title became extinct on the death of his son, the second Baronet, in 1999.

== Butt baronets, of Westminster (1929) ==
- Sir Alfred Butt, 1st Baronet (1878–1962)
- Sir (Alfred) Kenneth Dudley Butt, 2nd Baronet (1908–1999)
