= Roger Nathan, 2nd Baron Nathan =

British peer and solicitor (1922–2007)

Roger Carol Michael Nathan, 2nd Baron Nathan (5 December 1922 – 19 July 2007) was an English solicitor and hereditary peer.

== Family ==
Nathan was the son of Harry and Eleanor Nathan. His father was a Liberal politician who joined the Labour Party in 1934, who was created Baron Nathan in 1940 after he stood down as MP for Wandsworth Central to allow Ernest Bevin to take the seat.

== Early life ==
Nathan was educated at Stowe School and at New College, Oxford. He was called up in the Second World War. After training at Sandhurst, he was commissioned into the 17th/21st Lancers in 1942 and saw active service in North Africa, Italy, Austria, and Greece. He was mention in dispatches, and demobilised with the rank of captain in 1946.

== Law career ==
He returned to New College, Oxford, and read law. From 1948, he took his articles with his father, then on leave as Minister of Civil Aviation, and joined his father's firm, Herbert Oppenheimer Nathan and Vandyk. He became a partner when he qualified in 1950, on the same day as his marriage. He worked on the flotations of Sainsbury's and Plessey on the London Stock Exchange.

He succeeded his father as the 2nd Baron Nathan in 1963 and sat on the crossbenches. He became senior partner of Herbert Oppenheimer in 1978. The firm collapsed in 1988, and he joined many of its former partners at Denton Hall Burgin and Warren, where he was a consultant until 1992.

== Notable activities ==
He was involved in environmental issues, and various charities. He was a member of the Cavalry Club, and served as Master of the Gardeners' Company. He was chairman and then a vice-president of the Royal Society of Arts from 1975 to 1977. He was president of the Jewish Welfare Board from 1967 to 1971, and chairman and later honorary president of the Central British Fund for Jewish Relief and Rehabilitation. He became an honorary Doctor of Laws at the University of Sussex in 1988. He was president of the Society of Sussex Downsmen in 1987, and later chairman of the South Downs Conservation Board.

== Personal life ==
He lived at Collyers Farm at Lickfold in Sussex. He enjoyed playing the piano and the violin. He also enjoyed horse riding, hunting with the Eridge Hunt and Cowdray Hunt. His memoirs, The Spice of Life, were published in 2003 by the Memoir Club.

He married Philippa Solomon in 1950, daughter of Major J. B. Solomon, MC. They had two daughters and a son. He was succeeded in the barony by his son, Rupert.

== Arms ==
Coat of arms of Roger Nathan, 2nd Baron Nathan
Crest A kiln inflamed Proper. Escutcheon Or a fess cottised Sable over all a sword erect Gules on a canton of the second a roll of parchment Proper. Supporters Dexter a lion sinister a hind Argent each charged on the shoulder with a grenade Sable fired Proper. Motto Labor Nobilitat

Peerage of the United Kingdom
Preceded by Harry Nathan	Baron Nathan; 1963–2007	Succeeded by Rupert Nathan
