= Nachan =

Nachan is a surname. Notable people with the surname include:

- Natta Nachan (born 1990), Thai javelin thrower
- Saquib Nachan (died 2025), Indian convicted terrorist

== See also ==
- Nachan Assembly constituency, a constituency in the Indian Himachal Pradesh Legislative Assembly
- Jean Nachand (born 1955), American tennis player
- Nathan (disambiguation)
