= Michael Hughes-Young, 1st Baron St Helens =

British politician (1912–1980)

The Right Honourable The Lord St Helens MC

Government Deputy Chief Whip in the House of Commons Treasurer of the Household
- In office 6 March 1962 – 15 October 1964
- Prime Minister: Harold Macmillan; Alec Douglas-Home
- Preceded by: Edward Wakefield
- Succeeded by: Sydney Irving

Member of Parliament for Wandsworth Central
- In office 26 May 1955 – 15 October 1964
- Preceded by: Richard Adams
- Succeeded by: David Kerr

Member of the House of Lords
- Lord Temporal
- In office 1 January 1965 – 27 December 1980
- Preceded by: Peerage created
- Succeeded by: The 2nd Baron St Helens

Personal details
- Born: Michael Henry Colin Hughes-Young; 28 October 1912
- Died: 27 December 1980 (aged 68)
- Party: Conservative
- Parent: Brigadier-General Henry Young
- Education: Harrow School
- Alma mater: Royal Military Academy Sandhurst

Michael Henry Colin Hughes-Young, 1st Baron St Helens (28 October 1912 – 27 December 1980), was a British Army officer and politician. He served as a Government whip for nine years; after being defeated, he was given an hereditary peerage by the Crown.

== Family ==
Hughes-Young was the son of Brigadier-General Henry Young, a Northern Ireland-born Cavalry Officer who later served as Sergeant-at-Arms for the Parliament of Northern Ireland. He was sent to Selwyn House Preparatory School in Broadstairs, and then to Harrow School; he followed his father into the Army, studying at Sandhurst. In 1932 he joined the Black Watch.

== Army career ==
In 1934, Hughes-Young was attached to the French Army on an exchange programme; in 1935 he was seconded to the King's African Rifles. On the outbreak of the Second World War he married Elizabeth Blakiston-Houston, also from Northern Ireland. He fought against Italy in Abyssinia, and later returned to Britain where he participated in the invasion of Europe; he was wounded twice and won the Military Cross.

== Politics ==
Hughes-Young left the army, with the rank of Lieutenant-Colonel, in 1947, and settled in Englefield Green in Surrey. He became an official of Conservative Central Office in the publicity department. At the 1951 general election, he fought St Helens against Hartley Shawcross, the President of the Board of Trade in the Labour government; this was a safe Labour constituency but it gave Hughes-Young much experience of fighting an election campaign.

== Election to Parliament ==
Prior to the 1955 general election Hughes-Young was selected as Conservative candidate for Wandsworth Central, a marginal seat. The Labour incumbent Richard Adams retired and Hughes-Young beat Labour's new candidate, Patricia Llewelyn-Davies, by just over 1,000 votes. He took until December to make his maiden speech, which was in a debate on raising the level of National Assistance; he argued that many people resented receiving it because it was charity which brought shame on their family.

== Whip's Office ==
Hughes-Young served as Parliamentary Private Secretary to the Minister of State, Board of Trade for some months in 1956. Harold Macmillan appointed Hughes-Young as an Assistant Whip when he became Prime Minister in January 1957. This silenced him in the Chamber of the House of Commons (because whips were not supposed to speak), although it was an unpaid post. In 1958 he was part of a Parliamentary delegation to the United States. He was also a member of a team of Ministers who went round the country making speeches in support of the government in September 1958. The next month, he was promoted to be a Lord Commissioner of the Treasury, a paid whip's role.

He had a tough fight against the same Labour opponent in the 1959 general election, but increased his majority to 1,972. He was designated as Deputy Government Chief Whip. In December 1961, he was involved in an outbreak of "grave disorder" in the Commons Chamber when he moved the closure of a debate before the Labour opposition spokesman, Patrick Gordon Walker had had chance to speak. This act provoked a lengthy dispute between the Parliamentary Labour Party and the Deputy Speaker. It did not harm his career as in March 1962 he was promoted to be Treasurer of the Household.

== Defeat ==
At the 1964 general election, Hughes-Young faced another challenge from Labour, who had selected Dr David Kerr; in his election address he pointed to the fact that Labour had opposed the Commonwealth Immigrants Act 1962 and asked how the local housing situation would cope without restrictions on immigration. In line with the national swing, Labour gained the constituency by 2,245 votes.

== Peerage ==
Sir Alec Douglas-Home gave Hughes-Young a hereditary peerage in his resignation honours list. He took the title Baron St Helens, of St Helens in the County Palatine of Lancaster. His maiden speech on 10 March 1965 was on immigration; a month later he called for some of the commons on the outskirts of London to be used for temporary housing. He opposed the Bill to suspend the use of capital punishment. In March 1970 his elder son Patrick died from injuries received in point-to-point racing.

He was named in the UK Delegation to attend the Parliamentary Assembly of the Council of Europe and Western European Union in 1970, and introduced a debate on housing in the House of Lords that May, opposing any reductions in the rate of house building and highlighting the breaking of an election pledge by the Labour government.

Coat of arms of Michael Hughes-Young, 1st Baron St Helens
Crest A dexter cubit arm Proper charged with a fountain a hand grasping an arrow fesswise Proper. Escutcheon Or three piles Sable each charged with a fountain. Supporters Dexter a wolf Gules sinister a griffin Sable each charged on the shoulder with a portcullis Or. Motto Press Through

Parliament of the United Kingdom
Preceded by Richard Adams	Member of Parliament for Wandsworth Central; 1955–1964	Succeeded by David Kerr
Political offices
Preceded by Edward Wakefield	Deputy Chief Whip of the House of Commons; Treasurer of the Household; 1962–1964	Succeeded by Sydney Irving
Party political offices
Preceded by Edward Wakefield	Conservative Deputy Chief Whip in the House of Commons; 1962–1964	Succeeded by John Hill
Peerage of the United Kingdom
New creation	Baron St Helens; 3rd creation 1964–1980	Succeeded by Richard Hughes-Young
