= 1936 Balham and Tooting by-election =

UK Parliamentary by-election

The 1936 Balham and Tooting by-election was held on 23 July 1936. The by-election was held after the incumbent Conservative MP, Sir Alfred Butt, 1st Baronet resigned in June 1936 over a scandal concerning a leak of budget details from which he was believed to have benefitted financially. It was won by the Conservative candidate George Doland.

Balham and Tooting by-election, 1936
Party	Candidate	Votes	%	±%
Conservative	George Doland	14,959	53.7	−9.2
Labour	W J Miller	12,889	46.3	+9.2
Majority		2,070	7.4	−18.5
Turnout		27,848	49.2	−12.6
Conservative hold		Swing		
