= Richard Adams (British politician) =

British politician

- Adams in 1949

Lord Commissioner of the Treasury
- In office 1949–1951
- Prime Minister: Clement Attlee

Member of Parliament for Wandsworth Central
- In office 23 February 1950 – 6 May 1955
- Preceded by: Ernest Bevin
- Succeeded by: Michael Hughes-Young

Member of Parliament for Balham and Tooting
- In office 5 July 1945 – 3 February 1950
- Preceded by: George Doland
- Succeeded by: Constituency abolished

Personal details
- Born: 8 October 1912
- Died: 25 June 1978 (aged 65)
- Party: Labour
- Spouses: Joyce Love (m. 1938; div. 1955) Peggy Fribbins (m. 1956)
- Education: University of London

Captain Harold Richard Adams (8 October 1912 – 25 June 1978) was a British Labour politician who served as the Member of Parliament for Balham and Tooting from 1945 to 1950, and Wandsworth Central from 1950 to 1955.

== Early life and military career ==
Born on 8 October 1912, the son of A. Adams, he was educated at Emanuel School and studied at the University of London. He was a lecturer in Economics and Business Administration. He married twice, firstly to Joyce Love in 1938, with whom he had two daughters; the marriage was dissolved in 1955, and he married secondly to Peggy Fribbins in 1956.

He began his political career on Wandsworth borough council, where he was a member from 1938 to 1940, but this was interrupted by the outbreak of the Second World War. He joined the East Surrey Regiment in 1940, and saw service with the 25th Army Tank Brigade in North Africa and Italy, before ending the war serving on the staff in Land Forces Adriatic.

== Political career and later life ==
Having fought Canterbury in 1935, he was elected as the Labour Member of Parliament for Balham and Tooting, part of his home district of Wandsworth, in the 1945 general election. He was an assistant whip from 1947, and became a Lord Commissioner of the Treasury in 1949, a post he held until 1951.

Balham and Tooting was dissolved for the 1950 general election, and Adams stood in the redrawn Wandsworth Central constituency, succeeding Ernest Bevin as its Member of Parliament. He was re-elected for the same seat in the 1951 general election, but chose to stand down in the 1955 election, being succeeded in the now-marginal seat by the Conservative Michael Hughes-Young.

Adams died on 25 June 1978.

Parliament of the United Kingdom
Preceded by George Frederick Doland	Member of Parliament for Balham and Tooting; 1945 – 1950	Constituency abolished
Preceded by Ernest Bevin	Member of Parliament for Wandsworth Central; 1950 – 1955	Succeeded by Michael Hughes-Young
