= Elias Salomon Nathan =

German author and physician

- Born: 17 May 1807; Eutin, Duchy of Oldenburg
- Died: 5 July 1862 (aged 55); Hamburg, German Confederation
- Education: University of Kiel
- Spouse: Jeanette Segalla
- Writing career
- Pen name: Dr. Essenna

Elias Salomon Nathan (17 May 1807 – 5 July 1862) was a German writer and medical doctor.

He was born in Eutin, Duchy of Oldenburg, to Caroline (née Warrisch) and Salomon Aaron Nathan. He studied medicine at the University of Kiel, receiving his M.D. in 1830. He took part in the Polish campaign, and afterward settled in Hamburg as a physician.

In addition to his literary activity in medical science, he devoted himself to Jewish learning. Under the pseudonym "Dr. Essenna" he translated Joseph Salvador's Histoire des institutions de Moïse et du peuple hébreu into German, with an introduction by Gabriel Riesser. Under the same pseudonym he published Gedanken aus dem Tagebuche eines Juden über die Drei Grossen Propheten der Europäischen Geschichte.

== Publications ==
- De febre intermittente traumatica. Diss. inaug (in Latin). Kiliæ: C. F. Mohr. 1830.
- Denkwürdige Beispiele aus der Kirchengeschichte für herrschende und beherrschte Gemeinschaften (in German). Hamburg: Nestler u. Co. 1835.
- Gedanken aus dem Tagebuche eines Juden über die Drei Grossen Propheten der Europäischen Geschichte (in German). Hamburg: F. H. Nestler und Melle. 1836. hdl:2027/uc1.a0012410320.
- Geschichte der Mosaischen Institutionen und des jüdischen Volks (in German). Vol. 1. Hamburg: Hoffmann und Campe. 1836.
- Geschichte der Mosaischen Institutionen und des jüdischen Volks (in German). Vol. 2. Hamburg: Hoffmann und Campe. 1836.
- Geschichte der Mosaischen Institutionen und des jüdischen Volks (in German). Vol. 3. Hamburg: Hoffmann und Campe. 1836.
- Über Aether-Rausch (in German). Hamburg: Perthes-Besser & Mauke. 1847.
- Über das psychische Lachen (in German). Hamburg: Perthes-Besser & Mauke. 1843.
