= George Doland =

British politician

Lieutenant-Colonel George Frederick Doland OBE (1 May 1872 – 26 November 1946) was a British businessman and Conservative politician.

A native of the Wandsworth area, Doland was a merchant tailor, who established a chain of shops in south-west London. In 1912, he entered local politics and was elected as a Municipal Reform Party member of Wandsworth Borough Council for Balham ward. He served on Wandsworth council for more than a quarter of a century, and was mayor of the borough in 1928-29 and 1933–34. In 1934, he was elected to the London County Council as a Municipal Reform councilor for Balham and Tooting, and retained the seat in 1937. He was appointed a deputy lieutenant for the County of London in 1938.

Doland was too old for active service in World War I, but became a member of the Volunteer Training Force. He was granted a commission as a temporary major in the County of London Motor Volunteer Corps in 1917, and was promoted to temporary lieutenant-colonel. He was subsequently a member of the Royal Army Service Corps Motor Transport (Volunteers), and resigned his commission in 1921. He was permitted to retain the honorary rank of "lieutenant-colonel".

In June 1936, Sir Alfred Butt, the sitting Conservative Member of Parliament (MP) for Balham and Tooting resigned following a scandal concerning the leak of details of the budget. Doland was chosen to be Conservative candidate for the resulting by-election, and was unopposed by the other parties forming the Coalition Government. In a straight fight with W G Miller of the Labour Party, he retained the seat with a majority of 2,070 votes.

Doland was a member of the Commons for nine years. Elections were cancelled on the outbreak of World War II in 1939, and the next general election was not called until 1945. As he was over seventy years of age, Doland chose to retire from parliament.

He died in November 1946, aged 74, from complications following a medical operation. He was cremated at Putney Vale Cemetery.

Parliament of the United Kingdom
Preceded by Sir Alfred Butt, 1st Baronet	Member of Parliament for Balham and Tooting; 1936 – 1945	Succeeded by Harold Richard Adams
