= David Kerr (English politician) =

British politician (1923–2009)

David Leigh Kerr (25 March 1923 – 12 January 2009) was a Labour Party politician in the United Kingdom.

== Early life ==
Kerr was born on 25 March 1923 in London to Russian Jewish parents. He attended Norbury Manor Primary School, then won a scholarship to Whitgift, a public school in Croydon before studying at Middlesex Medical School, 1941–46.

A sufferer of diabetes, he was prohibited from joining the Royal Air Force during World War II, but would go on to work in the ambulance corps during the Blitz. On qualifying as a doctor in 1946, he joined a medical practice for Tooting and Balham.

== Political career ==
Kerr stood unsuccessfully for Streatham in the 1959 general election. He was elected Member of Parliament (MP) for Wandsworth Central from 1964 to 1970. Aside from two years between 1967 and 1969 as parliamentary private secretary to Judith Hart, the minister of state in the Commonwealth Office, in 1967–69, Kerr remained on the backbenches during his time as an MP.

Kerr was active in the Socialist Medical Association as honorary secretary (1957–63) and then vice-president (1963–72). On standing down from the House of Commons he described himself as a "better doctor than politician".

Kerr served on the Board of Governors of the British Film Institute between 1966 and 1971. After standing down as an MP, Kerr served as director and chairman of the anti-poverty charity War on Want.

He later served as a county councillor in Welwyn Garden City, Hertfordshire, retiring from that role in 2001.

== Death ==
Kerr died on 12 January 2009, aged 85.

Parliament of the United Kingdom
Preceded by Michael Hughes-Young	Member of Parliament for Wandsworth Central; 1964–1970	Succeeded by Tom Cox
