= Nathan =

Nathan or Natan may refer to:

== People and biblical figures ==
- Nathan (given name), including a list of people and characters with this name
- Nathan (surname)
- Nathan (prophet), a person in the Hebrew Bible
- Nathan (son of David), a biblical figure, son of King David and Bathsheba
- Nathan the Babylonian, 2nd-century Judean rabbi
- Nathan of Gaza, a charismatic figure who spread the word of Sabbatai Zevi
- Starboy Nathan, a British singer who used the stage name "Nathan" from 2006 to 2011
- Nathan (footballer, born 1994), Brazilian winger Nathan Athaydes Campos Ferreira
- Nathan (footballer, born 1995), Brazilian centre back Nathan Raphael Pelae Cardoso
- Nathan (footballer, born 1996), Brazilian midfielder Nathan Allan de Souza
- Nathan (footballer, born May 1999), Brazilian forward Nathan Crepaldi da Cruz
- Nathan (footballer, born August 1999), Brazilian forward Nathan Palafoz de Sousa
- Nathan (footballer, born 2001), Brazilian right back Nathan Santos de Araújo
- Nathan (footballer, born 2002), Brazilian right back Nathan Gabriel de Souza Mendes
- Nathan (footballer, born 2005), Brazilian forward Nathan Ribeiro Fernandes

== Other uses ==
- Nathan, Queensland, a suburb of Brisbane in Australia
- Nathan (band), an alt-country band from Winnipeg, Manitoba, Canada
- Vethan or "Nathan", a deity in Ayyavazhi theology
- Éditions Nathan, a French publishing house, a subsidiary of Editis
- Nathan Manufacturing (Airchime, Ltd.), a train horn manufacturer
- Nathan Road, the main thoroughfare in Kowloon, Hong Kong
- Nathan (album), a 1994 album by Nathan Cavaleri
- The title character of Nathan the Wise, a 1779 play by Gotthold Ephraim Lessing

== See also ==
- All pages beginning with Nathan
- Nate (disambiguation)
- Na Tan District in Ubon Ratchathani Province, Thailand
- Natan Couture, a Belgian fashion house created and owned by Édouard Vermeulen
- Rabbi Nathan (disambiguation)
