= Alfred Butt =

British politician (1878–1962)

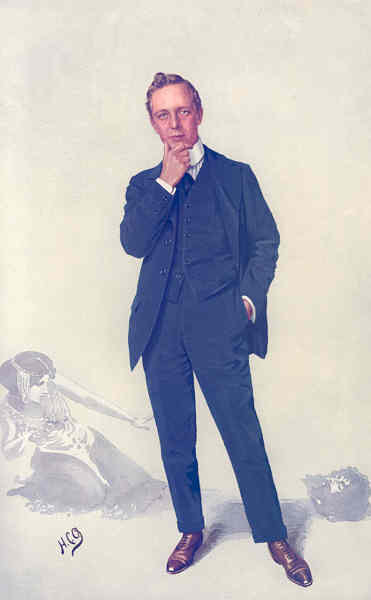
"The Palace" Butt as caricatured in Vanity Fair, December 1910

Sir Alfred Butt, 1st Baronet (20 March 1878 – 8 December 1962) was a British theatre impresario, Conservative politician and racehorse owner and breeder. During a fourteen-year tenure as manager of London's Palace Theatre, beginning in 1904, Butt built a theatre empire, expanding firstly with the Alhambra Theatre, Glasgow in 1910, followed by the London Victoria Palace a year later, to rival that of Edward Moss and others. He became managing director of several London West End theatres beginning in 1914, including the Adelphi Theatre, the Empire Theatre, the Gaiety Theatre and the Theatre Royal, Drury Lane, as well as theatres outside London. He continued as a theatre impresario until 1931.

During the First World War, also, Butt became Director of Food Rationing at the Ministry of Food. He was knighted for his services to the ministry, and for his work for war charities, in 1918. He was elected as Member of Parliament (MP) for Balham and Tooting in 1922. In 1929, he was created a baronet "of Westminster in the County of London" for his services to political and public life. He was forced to resign from the Commons in June 1936 over a financial scandal. After this, Butt concentrated on horse racing.

== Life and career ==
Alfred Butt was born in London, the son of solicitor Alfred Beyfus whose forebears had migrated from Hamburg to Glasgow and London, and educated at Emanuel School before entering employment in the counting-house of Harrods department store where his uncle, Edgar Cohen, through the Beyfus family was a director. He subsequently joined the Palace Theatre, a music hall in Cambridge Circus, London, largely controlled by the Beyfus family and associates. He became company secretary of the Palace Theatre Limited in 1898, at the young age of 19. He quickly advanced to the position of assistant manager, and when Charles Morton retired in 1904, he became manager of the Palace. In 1906 he became managing director, a position he held for 14 years.

He developed close links with the Orpheum Vaudeville Circuit and its associates in the United States, and brought numerous American stars to London. He also introduced British audiences to continental performers such as Anna Pavlova and Yvette Guilbert. In 1910 he greatly expanded his theatre business when he took control of Thomas Barrasford's music halls and formed a joint company, the "Variety Theatres Controlling Company Limited", with Walter de Frece. VTCC became the second largest chain of music halls in the United Kingdom, second only to Moss Empires. Among their London theatres managed by Butt were the Globe and Queen's Theatres.

Outside London Butt opened two new theatres, firstly, the Alhambra Theatre, Glasgow, in 1910, designed by Sir John James Burnet and, secondly, the Theatre Mogador, Paris in 1919 (delayed by the First World War), designed by Bertie Crewe. Butt became managing director of three West End theatres during the war: the Adelphi Theatre (1915–19), the Empire Theatre (1914–28) and the Gaiety Theatre (1915–19). He became joint owner and managing director of London's Theatre Royal, Drury Lane from 1925 to 1931.

Also during the First World War, he was appointed in 1917 by the new Prime Minister David Lloyd George as the Director of Food Rationing, and introduced compulsory food rationing with the support of his principal civil servant William Beveridge. He was knighted for his services to the Ministry, and for his work for war charities, in 1918.

Butt was a supporter of the Conservative & Unionist Party. After standing unsuccessfully for the party at parliamentary elections at Walworth and Paddington North, he was elected as member of parliament for Balham and Tooting at the 1922 general election. In 1929 he was created a baronet "of Westminster in the County of London" for his services to political and public life. He held the seat at successive elections until he was forced to resign from the Commons in June 1936 over a scandal concerning a leak of budget details from which he was believed to have benefited financially.

With the end of his political career, Butt concentrated on his interest in the horse-racing industry. He purchased the Brook Stud near Newmarket. His two most successful horses were Steady Aim, winner of The Oaks, and Petition, winner of the Ascot New Stakes, both in 1946.

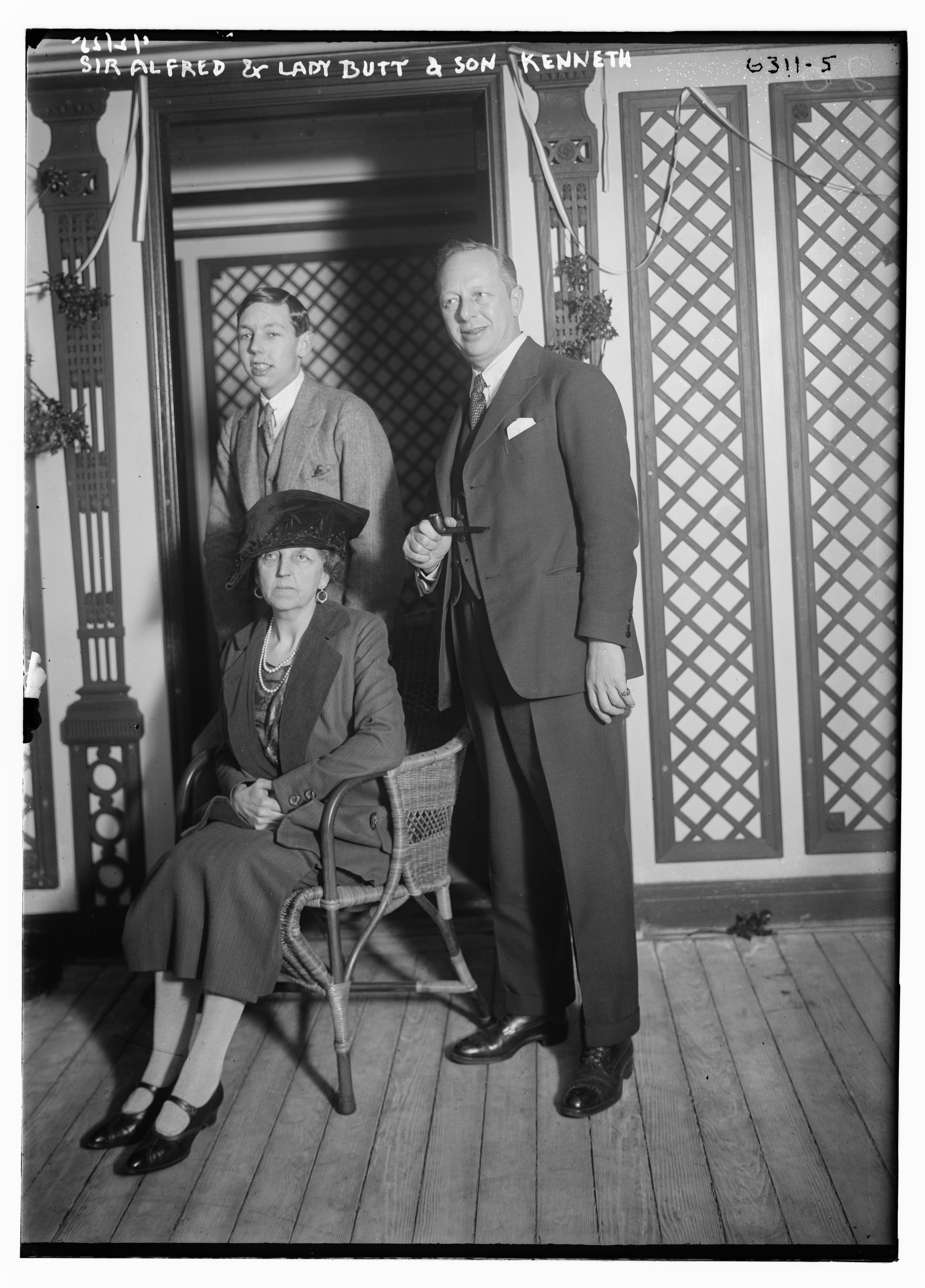
Sir Alfred and Lady Butt and son Kenneth, 1925

== Personal life ==
He was married twice. The first marriage in 1908 was to Georgina Mary Say, who died in 1960. His second marriage was to Wilhelmine Wahl later in 1960. He had one son, Kenneth Dudley Butt, from his first marriage.

Sir Alfred Butt died at his Newmarket home in December 1962, aged 84. He was cremated at Cambridge Crematorium.

== Notes ==
Parliament of the United Kingdom
Preceded by John Denison-Pender	Member of Parliament for Balham & Tooting; 1922–1936	Succeeded by George Frederick Doland
Baronetage of the United Kingdom
New creation	Baronet (of Westminster); 1929–1962	Succeeded by Kenneth Butt
