= Sir Henry Jackson, 1st Baronet =

British mineralogist and politician

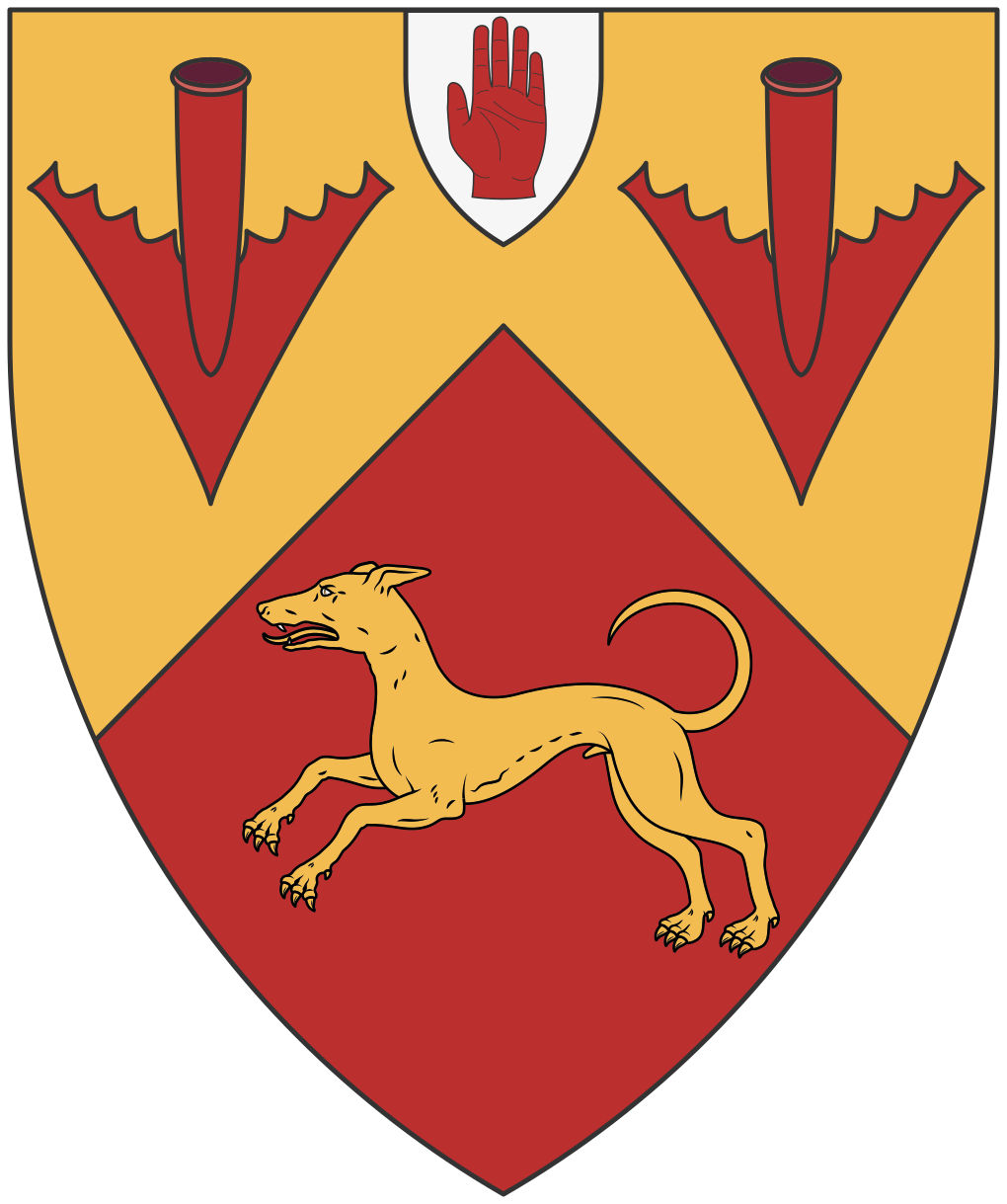
The coat of arms of Jackson of Wandsworth, Baronets.

Sir Henry Jackson, 1st Baronet (22 August 1875 – 23 February 1937) was a British mineralogist and later Conservative Party politician.

He was educated at Bury Grammar School and the universities of Cambridge, London, and Edinburgh, gaining a first class degree in natural sciences. He was a fellow and tutor at Downing College, Cambridge between 1901 and 1911. Before entering politics he practiced as a physician, and during the First World War he served in the Royal Army Medical Corps, rising to the rank of Major.

After serving as Mayor of Wandsworth, 1921–24, he was elected at the 1924 general election as the member of parliament (MP) for Wandsworth Central, but was narrowly defeated at the 1929 general election by the Labour Party candidate, Archibald Church. At the next election, in 1931, Church did not stand again, and Jackson retook the seat with a large majority. He was re-elected in 1935, and held the seat until his death in 1937, aged 61. He is buried at Putney Vale Cemetery.

He was seen as an expert in traffic problems, and served on a number of transport committees, including the London Passenger Transport Board. He was knighted on 1 March 1924, and made a baronet on 4 July 1935 for "services in connection with transport questions". Having no children, the title became extinct on his death.

Parliament of the United Kingdom
Preceded by Sir John Norton-Griffiths	Member of Parliament for Wandsworth Central; 1924 – 1929	Succeeded by Archibald Church
Preceded by Archibald Church	Member of Parliament for Wandsworth Central; 1931 – 1937	Succeeded by Harry Nathan
Baronetage of the United Kingdom
New creation	Baronet (of Wandsworth); 1935–1937	Extinct
