= Archibald Church =

British school teacher, soldier and politician

Archibald Church MC DSO
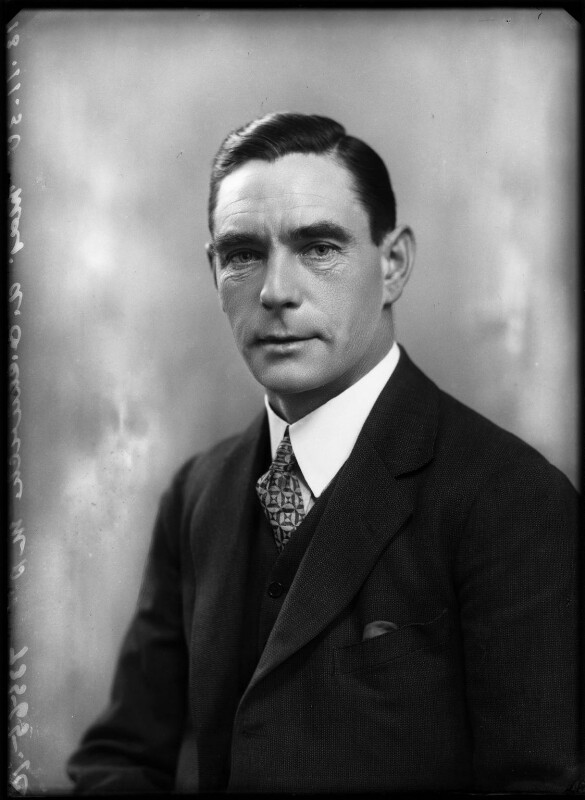

Member of Parliament for Leyton East
- In office 6 December 1923 – 9 October 1924
- Preceded by: Ernest Edward Alexander
- Succeeded by: Ernest Edward Alexander

Member of Parliament for Wandsworth Central
- In office 30 May 1929 – 7 October 1931
- Preceded by: Sir Henry Jackson
- Succeeded by: Sir Henry Jackson

Personal details
- Born: Archibald George Church; 7 September 1886 Mile End/Bow, Middlesex
- Died: 23 August 1954 (aged 67) St Stephens Hospital, Fulham, London
- Party: Labour; National Labour (after 1931)
- Spouse(s): Gladys Amy Hunter, Katherine Mary Strange Wickham
- Children: Joan Margaret Norah Church
- Profession: Soldier

Military service
- Allegiance: United Kingdom
- Branch/service: British Army: Royal Garrison Artillery
- Rank: Major
- Awards: DSO, MC

Major Archibald George Church DSO MC (7 September 1886 – 23 August 1954) was a British school teacher, soldier and Labour Party then National Labour politician. He served as the Member of Parliament (MP) for Leyton East from 1923 to 1924, and for Wandsworth Central from 1929 to 1931.

== Early life ==
Church was born on 7 September 1886 in London, England and was educated at University College, London. He was a schoolmaster from 1909 to 1914 when he joined the Army at the start of the First World War.

== Military career ==
Church served on the Western Front for three years with the Royal Garrison Artillery then the Royal Flying Corps. He was transferred to North Russia to command the Centre Column of the 237 Infantary Brigade. In January 1919, Church was awarded the Military Cross (MC) for his service during the First World War, and in January 1920 he was awarded the Distinguished Service Order (DSO) for action in the Murmansk Command during the British intervention in the Russian Civil War. The citation noted his "particular gallantry and zeal during the operations from Medevja-gora to Unitsa, 8 June to 26 July 1919".

== Political career ==
Failed 1922 campaign

Church first stood for Parliament at the 1922 general election, when he lost by a 35:65 ratio of votes in the Conservative-held part-rural, suburban Spelthorne seat.

Successful 1923 campaign and loss in 1924

At the 1923 general election he won the mainly urban Leyton East seat by a 7% margin from Unionist (Conservative) E.E. Alexander but the latter took it back in 1924 by the same rounded margin.

Successful 1929 campaign

He took urban, more middle class, Wandsworth Central returning to the Commons at the next general election in 1929 general election. He took it from Sir Henry Jackson, a recently knighted Conservative, noted in transport services. He won a slender majority of 300 votes (1.1% of the total).

Eugenic voluntary sterilisation bill

In July 1931, Church tabled a Ten Minute Rule Bill promoted by the Eugenics Education Society. Although the eugenics measure was "a Bill to enable mental defectives to undergo sterilizing operations or sterilizing treatment upon their own application, or that of their spouses or parents or guardians," its underlying purpose was the eventual introduction of compulsory sterilisation, with Church describing it as "an experiment on a small scale so that later on we may have the benefit of the results and experience gained in order to come to conclusions before bringing in a Bill for the compulsory sterilisation of the unfit." The Commons voted by 167 votes to 89 against any second reading.

Move to NLO and failed 1931 campaign

When the Labour Prime Minister Ramsay MacDonald left the party in 1931 to co-lead a Conservative-dominated National Government, Church was one of the few Labour MPs to support him. He followed MacDonald into the new National Labour Organisation then that year stood in the 1931 general election as a National Independent for the London University seat, where he lost by a 27:73 ratio against one candidate.

He stood again twice, as a National Labour (NLO) candidate: in Bristol East at the 1935 general election then in Derby at a by-election in July 1936, and in Tottenham South as an "Independent National" candidate (the local Conservatives had nominated their own candidate) at the 1945 general election Church came in third, Labour winning the seat. This was Church's last election.

In March 1934 he was appointed as a member of a Royal Commission established to enquire into the organisation and work of the University of Durham.

Parliament of the United Kingdom
Preceded by Ernest Alexander	Member of Parliament for Leyton East; 1923 – 1924	Succeeded by Ernest Alexander
Preceded by Sir Henry Jackson	Member of Parliament for Wandsworth Central; 1929 – 1931	Succeeded by Sir Henry Jackson, Bt
Trade union offices
Preceded by Norman Campbell	General Secretary of the National Union of Scientific Workers; 1920 – 1931	Succeeded by ?
