= Harry Nathan, 1st Baron Nathan =

British Liberal politician

The Right Honourable The Lord Nathan PC TD FBA FSA
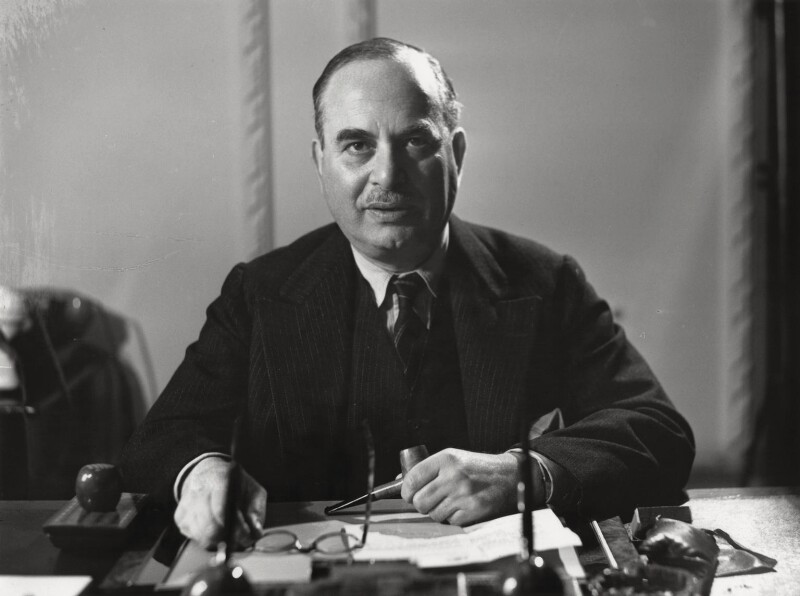

Minister of Civil Aviation
- In office 4 October 1946 – 31 May 1948
- Monarch: George VI
- Prime Minister: Clement Attlee
- Preceded by: Reginald Fletcher
- Succeeded by: The Lord Pakenham

Personal details
- Born: 2 February 1889
- Died: 23 October 1963 (aged 74)
- Party: Labour
- Spouse: Eleanor Nathan
- Children: Roger; Joyce
- Education: St Paul's School

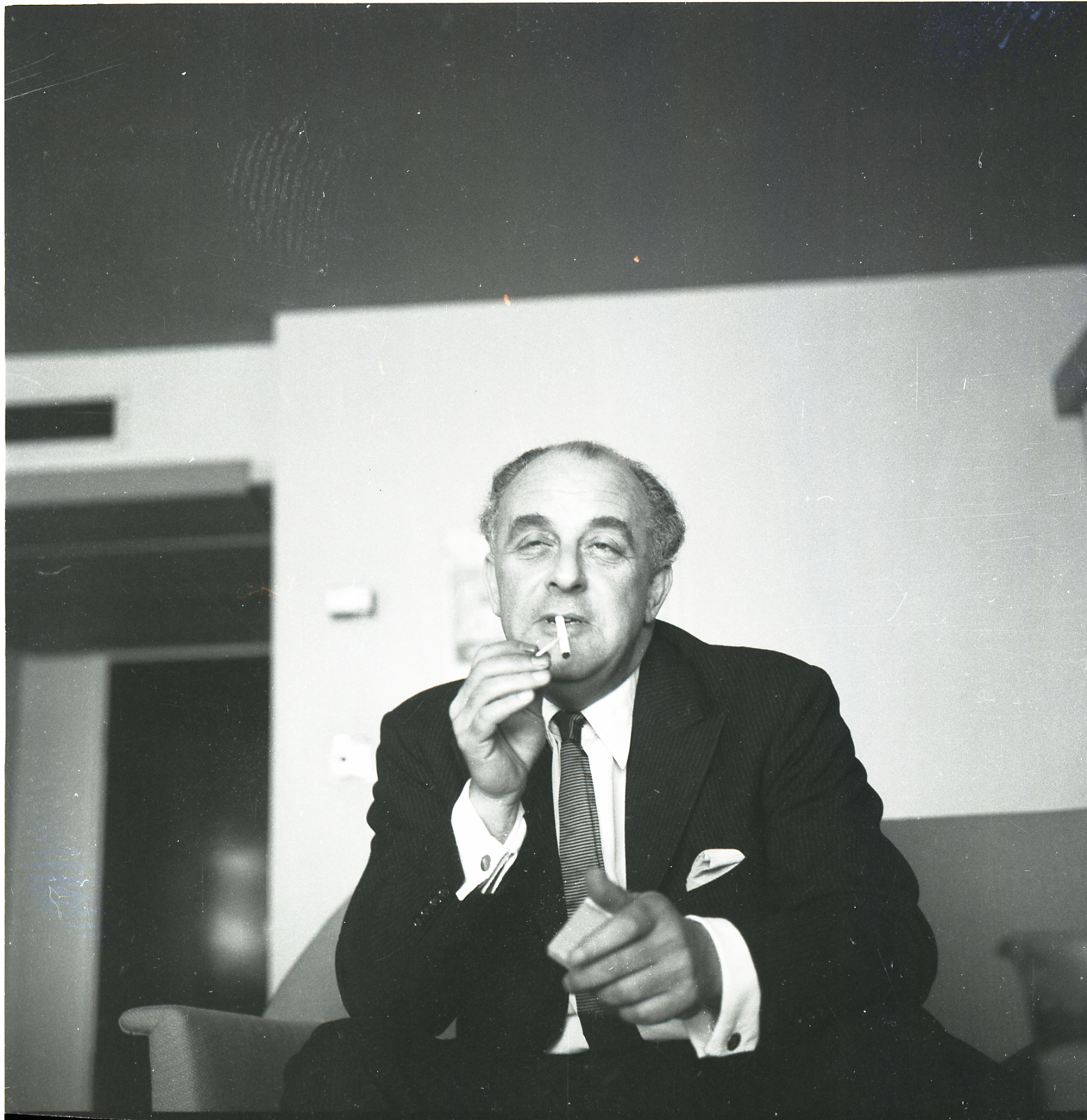
Baron Nathan during a 1962 visit to Israel

Harry Louis Nathan, 1st Baron Nathan, PC, TD, FBA, FSA (2 February 1889 – 23 October 1963) was a British politician, who represented first the Liberal Party, and then from 1934 onwards the Labour Party. He served two London seats non-consecutively and while serving the second seat was elevated to the House of Lords (by the creation of his peerage); five years later he served in two positions consecutively as a government minister in the Attlee Ministry until 1948.

== Early life ==
Nathan was born in London in 1889, son of Michael Henry Nathan, a fine art publisher and magistrate. Educated at St Paul's School, he became a solicitor and member of the firm of Herbert Oppenheimer, Nathan and Vandyk. He became honorary secretary of the Brady Working Lads' Club, the oldest and largest of the London Jewish Lads' Clubs (now JLGB).

Nathan served in World War I, leaving with the rank of Major. He acted as honorary solicitor to the Zionist Organization which promoted the re-establishment of Israel.

== Politics ==
He stood as the Liberal candidate in 1924 for Whitechapel and St. George's without success. He was a member of the Liberal Industrial Inquiry which prepared Britain's Industrial Future, also known as the Liberal Yellow Book. He was first elected in 1929 as Member of Parliament (MP) for Bethnal Green North East and was re-elected in 1931. Along with many other Anglo-Jewish communal leaders, Nathan was a founding member of the Central British Fund for German Jewry renamed some years after his death. In 1934, he defected to the Labour Party. Labour won the seat at the 1935 general election but Nathan was not their candidate; he opted instead to stand in Cardiff South. He lost by 1.8% of the votes cast, a small increase in the two-party swing his campaign saw – of 271 votes – would have seen him elected.

In 1937, Nathan returned to Parliament in a by-election in Wandsworth Central as the Labour candidate. He in turn stepped down in 1940 to make way for Ernest Bevin, and was created a hereditary peer as Baron Nathan, of Churt in the County of Surrey on 28 June 1940. He continued in active politics from the House of Lords, serving as Under-Secretary of State for War (1945–46 and Minister for Civil Aviation (4 October 1946 – 31 May 1948). He was made a Privy Counsellor in 1946.

== Family ==
His wife Eleanor Nathan was Chairman of London County Council (1947–1948). He was succeeded to the barony by his son Roger (1922–2007). His daughter, Joyce, an educationalist and public servant, married Bernard Waley-Cohen, later the 633rd Lord Mayor of London, and the son of Robert Waley Cohen, an industrialist and fellow leading member of the Central British Fund for German Jewry.

== Arms ==
Coat of arms of Harry Nathan, 1st Baron Nathan
Crest A kiln inflamed Proper. Escutcheon Or a fess cottised Sable over all a sword erect Gules on a canton of the second a roll of parchment Proper. Supporters Dexter a lion sinister a hind Argent each charged on the shoulder with a grenade Sable fired Proper. Motto Labor Nobilitat

== Bibliography ==
- Hyde, H. Montgomery (1968). Strong for Service: The Life of Lord Nathan of Churt. London: W. H. Allen. ISBN 0-491-00471-0.
- The Times obituary, 25 October 1963

Parliament of the United Kingdom
Preceded by Walter Windsor	Member of Parliament for Bethnal Green North East; 1929 – 1935	Succeeded by Daniel Chater
Preceded by Sir Henry Jackson	Member of Parliament for Wandsworth Central; 1937 – 1940	Succeeded by Ernest Bevin
Political offices
Preceded by Arthur Henderson; Sir Henry Page Croft	Under-Secretary of State for War; 1945–1946	Succeeded by The Lord Longford
Preceded by Reginald Fletcher	Minister of Civil Aviation; 1946–1948	Succeeded by The Lord Pakenham
Peerage of the United Kingdom
New creation	Baron Nathan; 1940–1963	Succeeded by Roger Nathan
