= 1940 Wandsworth Central by-election =

UK Parliamentary by-election

The 1940 Wandsworth Central by-election was held on 22 June 1940. The by-election was held due to the resignation of the incumbent Labour MP, Harry Nathan, in order to find a seat for the trade union leader and recently appointed Minister of Labour, Ernest Bevin, who ran as a member of the Labour Party. Bevin was elected unopposed.
