= Balham and Tooting =

Parliamentary constituency in the United Kingdom, 1918–1950

- Former borough constituency for the House of Commons

1918–1950
- Seats: one
- Created from: Wandsworth
- Replaced by: Clapham and Wandsworth Central

Balham and Tooting was a constituency in South London, which returned one Member of Parliament (MP) to the House of Commons of the Parliament of the United Kingdom. It was created for the 1918 general election and abolished for the 1950 general election.

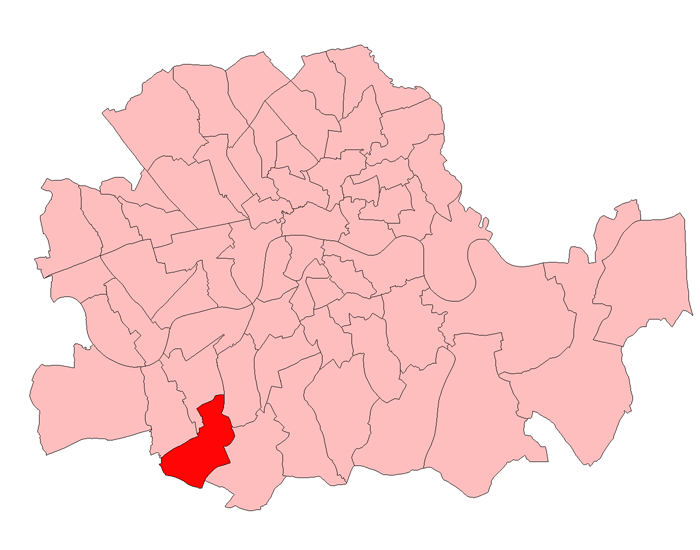
Balham & Tooting in the County of London

A map showing the wards of Wandsworth Metropolitan Borough as they appeared in 1916.

== Boundaries ==
The constituency, officially the Balham and Tooting Division of the Parliamentary Borough of Wandsworth, was created by the Representation of the People Act 1918. The 1918 Act had the principal aim of reducing the growing malapportionment due to electorate growth in geographical areas coupled with the subsidiary aim of realigning constituency boundaries so as to largely correspond with units of local government units (as created in 1889 and 1900). The new seat was one of five divisions of the Metropolitan Borough of Wandsworth in the parliamentary County of London.

The seat had previously formed part of the single-member Wandsworth constituency, created in 1885.

The constituency was defined in terms of wards of the metropolitan borough as they existed in 1918: it comprised the entire Tooting ward and the part of the Balham ward which lay to the west and south of the centre of Balham Hill, Balham High Road, Ormeley Road, Cavendish Road and Emmanuel Road. The remainder of the Balham ward was in another of the Wandsworth divisions, Clapham.

The constituency was surrounded by Wandsworth Central to the north-west, Battersea South to the north, Clapham to the north-east, Streatham to the east and south-east, Mitcham to the south and Wimbledon to the west.

In the redistribution which took effect with the 1950 United Kingdom general election the Tooting ward and part of Balham ward were included in the redrawn Wandsworth Central seat. The rest of Balham ward remained in the Clapham constituency.

== Members of Parliament ==
Election	Member	Party
1918	John Denison-Pender	Unionist
1922	Alfred Butt	Unionist
1936 b-e	George Doland	Conservative
1945	Richard Adams	Labour
1950	constituency abolished	

== Election results ==
=== Elections in the 1910s ===
General election 1918: Balham and Tooting
Party		Candidate	Votes	%	±%
C	Unionist	John Denison-Pender	12,405	59.7	
	Labour	Frank Smith	3,586	17.2	
	Independent Democrat	Alfred James Hurley	1,805	8.7	
	Liberal	Maxwell Anderson	1,542	7.4	
	Ind. Conservative	William Hunt	1,457	7.0	
Majority			8,819	42.5	
Turnout			20,795	51.7	
	Unionist win (new seat)				
C indicates candidate endorsed by the coalition government.

=== Elections in the 1920s ===
General election 1922: Balham and Tooting
Party	Candidate	Votes	%	±%
Unionist	Alfred Butt	17,239	68.2	+8.5
Liberal	Joseph William Molden	8,044	31.8	+24.4
Majority		9,195	36.4	−6.1
Turnout		25,283	61.1	+9.4
Unionist hold		Swing	−8.0	

General election 1923: Balham and Tooting
Party	Candidate	Votes	%	±%
Unionist	Alfred Butt	12,695	49.4	−18.8
Liberal	George Little	7,477	29.1	−2.7
Labour	Edward Archbold	5,536	21.5	New
Majority		5,218	20.3	−16.1
Turnout		25,708	61.1	0.0
Unionist hold		Swing	−8.0	

General election 1924: Balham and Tooting
Party	Candidate	Votes	%	±%
Unionist	Alfred Butt	20,378	67.8	+18.4
Labour	Edward Archbold	9,672	32.2	+10.7
Majority		10,706	35.6	+15.3
Turnout		30,050	70.3	+9.2
Unionist hold		Swing		

General election 1929: Balham and Tooting
Party	Candidate	Votes	%	±%
Unionist	Alfred Butt	18,181	45.2	−22.6
Labour	Charles Wortham Brook	13,499	33.6	+1.4
Liberal	William Hadley Summerskill	8,533	21.2	New
Majority		4,682	11.6	−24.0
Turnout		40,213	70.6	+0.3
Unionist hold		Swing	−12.0	

=== Elections in the 1930s ===
General election 1931: Balham and Tooting
Party	Candidate	Votes	%	±%
Conservative	Alfred Butt	28,592	74.5	+29.3
Labour	Percy F. Pollard	9,780	25.5	−8.1
Majority		18,812	49.0	+37.4
Turnout		38,372	67.1	−3.5
Conservative hold		Swing		

General election 1935: Balham and Tooting
Party	Candidate	Votes	%	±%
Conservative	Alfred Butt	22,013	62.9	−11.6
Labour	William Davies Lloyd	12,960	37.1	+11.6
Majority		9,053	25.9	−23.1
Turnout		34,973	61.8	−5.3
Conservative hold		Swing		

1936 Balham and Tooting by-election
Party	Candidate	Votes	%	±%
Conservative	George Doland	14,959	53.7	−9.2
Labour	W J Miller	12,889	46.3	+9.2
Majority		2,070	7.4	−18.5
Turnout		27,848	49.2	−12.6
Conservative hold		Swing		

=== Elections in the 1940s ===
General election 1945: Balham and Tooting
Party	Candidate	Votes	%	±%
Labour	Richard Adams	19,782	57.6	+20.5
Conservative	Walter Stanley Edgson	14,552	42.4	−20.5
Majority		5,230	15.2	N/A
Turnout		34,334	70.9	+14.1
Labour gain from Conservative		Swing		
