= Baron Nathan =

Barony in the Peerage of the United Kingdom

Baron Nathan, of Churt in the County of Surrey, is a title in the Peerage of the United Kingdom. It was created on 28 June 1940 for the lawyer and politician Harry Nathan. As of 2010 the title is held by his grandson, the third Baron, who succeeded his father in 2007.

== Barons Nathan (1940) ==
- Harry Louis Nathan, 1st Baron Nathan (1889–1963)
- Roger Carol Michael Nathan, 2nd Baron Nathan (1922–2007)
- Rupert Harry Bernard Nathan, 3rd Baron Nathan (born 26 May 1957), educated at Charterhouse School and Durham University (Hatfield College), Director of an import and export company

The heir apparent and sole heir to the title is the present holder's son, the Honourable Alasdair Harry S. Nathan (b. 1999)

Coat of arms of Baron Nathan
Crest A kiln inflamed Proper. Escutcheon Or a fess cottised Sable over all a sword erect Gules on a canton of the second a roll of parchment Proper. Supporters Dexter a lion sinister a hind Argent each charged on the shoulder with a grenade Sable fired Proper. Motto Labor Nobilitat
