= Joseph Salvador (scholar) =

French scholar (1796–1873)

Joseph Salvador (1796–1873) was a scholar from a Sephardi Jewish family in the south of France. Salvador was born in Montpellier. His family had fled to Southern France from Spain in the 15th century in the wake of the Spanish Inquisition where they acculturated to life in France. Salvador's mother was a Roman Catholic. At his personal request, he was buried in the Protestant cemetery of Le Vigan, near Montpellier.

== Biography ==
Salvador abandoned his medical studies when he read about the anti-Jewish riots in Germany in 1819, describing the impact of reading about the persecution of Jews in his later book, Paris, Rome, Jerusalem ou la Question religieuse au XIX siecle.

The book was condemned by the Catholic Church. Salvador's thesis "was his attempt to outline a universal religion based on a fusion of Judaism and Christianity- Reforming Judaism. The author believed that the natural center for this syncretistic religion was Jerusalem, and visualized the evolution of this universal faith as a lineal outgrowth of what he imagined classical Judaism to have been. To achieve this fusion of religions, Salvador advocated the establishment of a new state, a bridge between the Orient and the Occident, encompassing the borders of ancient Israel."

Salvador, regarded by some as a proto-Zionist, viewed Jerusalem and the future State of the restored Jews as a spiritual condition, not a political one. His thesis was modified and echoed by later Zionist thinkers such as Theodor Herzl and Ahad Ha'am.

Famous in his day, Salvador wrote several books.

French biographers and critics of the late nineteenth century regarded him as an assimilated French Jew whose work dealt with the nature of the Jewish religion.

However, subsequent Zionist writers have regarded him as a proto-Zionist who was really a Roman Catholic.

== Books ==
- Paris, Rome, Jerusalem ou la Question religieuse au XIX siecle
- Loi de Moise, 1822
- Histoire des institutions de Moise et du peuple hebreu, 1828
- Jesus-Christ et sa doctrine, 1838
- Histoire de la domination romaine en Judee, et de la ruine de Jerusalem, 1847
