= Wandsworth Central =

Parliamentary constituency in the United Kingdom, 1918–1974

- Former borough constituency for the House of Commons
- County: County of London, then Greater London

1918–1974
- Seats: One
- Created from: Wandsworth
- Replaced by: Tooting and Battersea South

Wandsworth Central was a parliamentary constituency in the Wandsworth district of South London. It returned one Member of Parliament (MP) to the House of Commons of the Parliament of the United Kingdom, elected by the first-past-the-post voting system.

The constituency was created for the 1918 general election, and abolished for the February 1974 general election.

== Boundaries ==
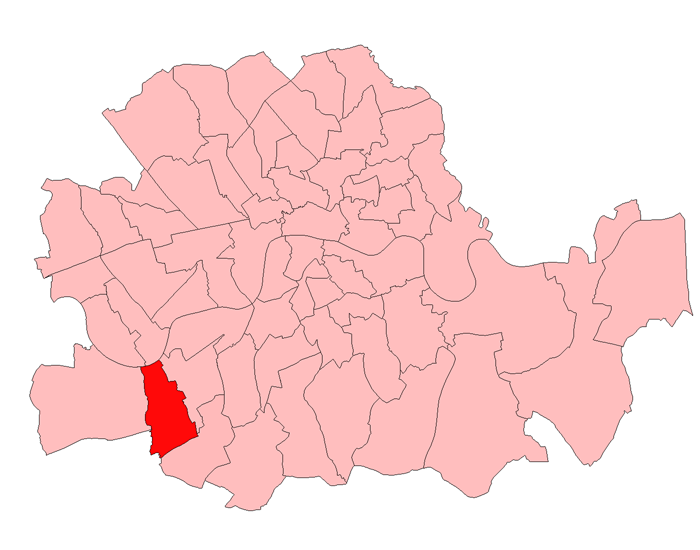
Wandsworth Central in the County of London 1918-50

A map showing the wards of Wandsworth Metropolitan Borough as they appeared in 1916.

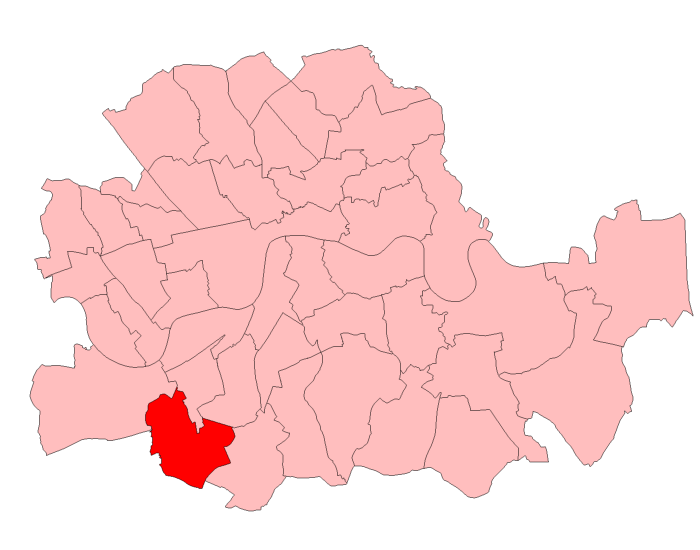
Wandsworth Central in the County of London 1950-74

When the constituency was created, in 1918, it was a division of the Metropolitan Borough of Wandsworth. It was in a part of the County of London, which was located in the northern part of the historic county of Surrey.

In 1965 the area of the constituency became part of the London Borough of Wandsworth in Greater London.

1918–1950: During the 1885-1918 distribution of parliamentary seats, the area had been part of the Wandsworth constituency. In 1918 the Metropolitan Borough (a larger area than the Wandsworth constituency had been) was split into five divisions. In addition to Central these divisions were Balham and Tooting, Clapham, Putney and Streatham.

The Central constituency comprised the Fairfield and Springfield wards of the Metropolitan Borough, as they existed in 1918.

The constituency was surrounded by the River Thames to the north, Battersea South to the east, Balham and Tooting to the south-east and south, Wimbledon to the south-west and Putney to the west.

1950–1974: In the redistribution, which took effect with the 1950 United Kingdom general election, the Metropolitan Borough was re-arranged into four divisions. The Balham and Tooting constituency was the one which disappeared.

Tooting ward and part of Balham ward were included in the redrawn Central seat. Springfield ward remained from the old Central division. Fairfield ward was transferred to the Putney constituency. The rest of Balham ward remained in the Clapham constituency.

The effect of these changes was to combine the southern part of the old Central, with the former Balham and Tooting. This moved the boundaries of this constituency south and east from those in the previous distribution.

The constituency was surrounded by Battersea South to the north, Clapham to the north-east, Streatham to the east, Mitcham in the south, Wimbledon to the south-west and Putney to the north-west.

In the 1974 re-distribution, which was the first after the local government boundary changes in 1965, the London Borough (with significantly different boundaries from the old Metropolitan Borough) was divided into four seats. Those were Battersea North, Battersea South, Putney and Tooting. The Springfield and Tooting wards were included in the Tooting constituency, with the Balham ward being included in Battersea South.

== Members of Parliament ==
Election	Member	Party
1918	Sir John Norton-Griffiths, Bt	Conservative
1924	Sir Henry Jackson	Conservative
1929	Archibald Church	Labour
1931	Archibald Church	National Labour
1931	Sir Henry Jackson, Bt	Conservative
1937 by-election	Harry Nathan	Labour
1940 by-election	Ernest Bevin	Labour
1950	Richard Adams	Labour
1955	Michael Hughes-Young	Conservative
1964	Dr David Kerr	Labour
1970	Tom Cox	Labour
Feb 1974	constituency abolished	

== Election results ==
Swing is only calculated when the same two parties, as in the previous election, share first and second place. Votes for other candidates are ignored in the calculation of Butler swing. A positive swing is from Labour towards the Conservative candidate and a negative swing is from Conservative towards a Labour candidate.

1910s – 1920s – 1930s – 1940s – 1950s – 1960s – 1970s

=== Elections in the 1910s ===
General election of 1918

General election 1918: Wandsworth Central
Party		Candidate	Votes	%	±%
	Unionist	John Norton-Griffiths	7,771	55.0	
	Labour	George Pearce Blizard	3,382	23.9	
C	Liberal	Henry Guest	2,988	21.1	
Majority			4,389	31.1	
Turnout			14,141	50.8	
Registered electors			27,825		
	Unionist win (new seat)				
C indicates candidate endorsed by the coalition government.

=== Elections in the 1920s ===
General election 1922: Wandsworth Central
Party	Candidate	Votes	%	±%
Unionist	John Norton-Griffiths	12,470	69.7	+14.7
Labour	Lewis Silkin	5,420	30.3	+6.4
Majority		7,050	39.4	+8.3
Turnout		17,890	61.4	+10.6
Unionist hold		Swing	+0.03	

General election 1923: Wandsworth Central (Note: This is result as declared and as it appears in standard works of reference. However an error was made during the tallying of Norton-Griffiths' votes when a batch of 1,000 was incorrectly counted as 100. Therefore Norton-Griffiths' total should really be 9,674. See TNA LCO 2/2584.)
Party	Candidate	Votes	%	±%
Unionist	John Norton-Griffiths	8,774	47.7	−22.0
Labour	George Pearce Blizard	5,294	28.7	−1.6
Liberal	Edward Maynard Coningsby Denney	4,357	23.6	New
Majority		3,480	19.0	−20.4
Turnout		18,425	62.0	+0.6
Unionist hold		Swing	-10.2	

General election 1924: Wandsworth Central
Party	Candidate	Votes	%	±%
Unionist	Henry Jackson	13,234	61.6	+13.9
Labour	Charles Latham	8,235	38.4	+9.7
Majority		4,999	23.2	+4.2
Turnout		21,469	70.8	+8.8
Unionist hold		Swing	-0.7	

General election 1929: Wandsworth Central
Party	Candidate	Votes	%	±%
Labour	Archibald Church	11,404	41.8	+3.4
Unionist	Henry Jackson	11,104	40.7	−20.9
Liberal	Arthur Wansbrough Duthie	4,784	17.5	New
Majority		300	1.1	N/A
Turnout		27,292	69.5	−1.3
Labour gain from Unionist		Swing	-12.3	

=== Elections in the 1930s ===
General election 1931: Wandsworth Central
Party	Candidate	Votes	%	±%
Conservative	Henry Jackson	19,159	70.7	+30.0
Labour	J.L. Cohen	7,512	27.7	−14.1
New Party	A.M. Diston	424	1.6	New
Majority		11,647	43.0	N/A
Turnout		26,895	68.7	−0.8
Registered electors		39,463		
Conservative gain from Labour		Swing	+22.5	

General election 1935: Wandsworth Central
Party	Candidate	Votes	%	±%
Conservative	Henry Jackson	14,728	58.6	−12.1
Labour	F. Wynne Davies	10,405	41.4	+13.7
Majority		4,323	17.2	−25.8
Turnout		25,133	65.0	−3.7
Registered electors		38,664		
Conservative hold		Swing	-13.2	

1937 Wandsworth Central by-election
Party	Candidate	Votes	%	±%
Labour	Harry Nathan	12,406	51.0	+9.6
Conservative	Roland Jennings	11,921	49.0	−9.6
Majority		485	2.0	N/A
Turnout		24,327	63.2	−1.8
Registered electors		38,478		
Labour gain from Conservative		Swing	-9.6	

=== Elections in the 1940s ===
- Creation of Nathan as the 1st Lord Nathan

By-election of 1940

By-Election 22 June 1940: Wandsworth Central
Party	Candidate	Votes	%	±%
Labour	Ernest Bevin	Unopposed	N/A	N/A
Labour hold				

- Note (1940): Bevin was the Minister of Labour and National Service at the time of his election. Under an agreement between the three parties comprising the wartime coalition, the parties which had not represented a seat when it became vacant would not contest the by-election.

General election of 1945

General election 1945: Wandsworth Central
Party	Candidate	Votes	%	±%
Labour	Ernest Bevin	14,126	61.2	+19.8
Conservative	John Smyth	8,952	38.8	−19.8
Majority		5,174	22.4	N/A
Turnout		23,078	73.6	+8.6
Registered electors		31,349		
Labour hold		Swing		

=== Elections in the 1950s ===
- There were major boundary changes, which came into effect, at the 1950 election (for details see the Boundaries section above).

General election 1950: Wandsworth Central
Party	Candidate	Votes	%	±%
Labour	Richard Adams	27,582	48.5	−12.7
Conservative	Robert Grant-Ferris	25,533	45.0	+6.2
Liberal	Alan H Rose	3,680	6.5	New
Majority		2,049	3.5	−18.9
Turnout		56,795	82.1	+8.5
Labour hold		Swing	+9.3	

General election 1951: Wandsworth Central
Party	Candidate	Votes	%	±%
Labour	Richard Adams	28,844	51.0	+2.5
Conservative	Robert Grant-Ferris	27,661	49.0	+4.0
Majority		1,183	2.0	−1.5
Turnout		56,505	83.7	+1.6
Labour hold		Swing	+0.9	

General election 1955: Wandsworth Central
Party	Candidate	Votes	%	±%
Conservative	Michael Hughes-Young	25,484	51.1	+2.1
Labour	Annie Llewelyn-Davies	24,391	48.9	−2.1
Majority		1,093	2.2	N/A
Turnout		49,875	77.6	−6.1
Conservative gain from Labour		Swing	+2.1	

General election 1959: Wandsworth Central
Party	Candidate	Votes	%	±%
Conservative	Michael Hughes-Young	23,655	47.7	−3.4
Labour	Annie Llewelyn-Davies	21,683	43.7	−5.2
Liberal	Ronald Arthur Locke	4,287	8.6	New
Majority		1,972	4.0	+1.8
Turnout		49,625	80.3	+2.7
Conservative hold		Swing	+1.1	

=== Elections in the 1960s ===
General election 1964: Wandsworth Central
Party	Candidate	Votes	%	±%
Labour	David Kerr	20,581	47.5	+3.8
Conservative	Michael Hughes-Young	18,336	42.4	−5.3
Liberal	Ronald Arthur Locke	4,369	10.1	+1.5
Majority		2,245	5.1	N/A
Turnout		43,286	74.2	−6.1
Labour gain from Conservative		Swing	-5.1	

General election 1966: Wandsworth Central
Party	Candidate	Votes	%	±%
Labour	David Kerr	22,159	52.8	+5.3
Conservative	Bryan Cassidy	16,331	39.0	−3.4
Liberal	Mario Uziell-Hamilton	3,429	8.2	−1.9
Majority		5,828	13.8	+8.7
Turnout		41,919	74.2	0.0
Labour hold		Swing	-4.7	

=== Elections in the 1970s ===
General election 1970: Wandsworth Central
Party	Candidate	Votes	%	±%
Labour	Tom Cox	19,776	54.0	+1.2
Conservative	Patricia McLaughlin	16,830	46.0	+7.0
Majority		2,946	8.0	−5.8
Turnout		36,606	62.6	−11.6
Registered electors		58,502		
Labour hold		Swing	+3.5	

- Constituency abolished (1974)
