= Ernest Bevin =

British politician (1881–1951)

The Right Honourable Ernest Bevin
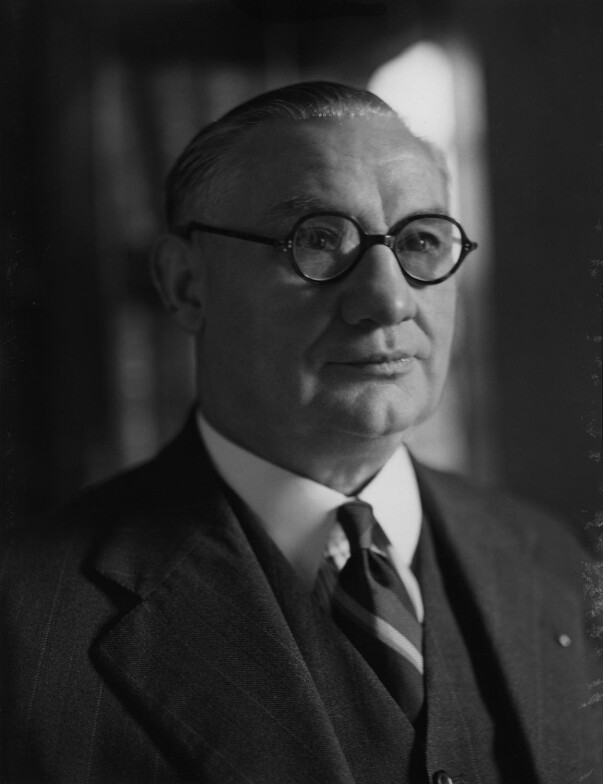
- Bevin in 1942

Lord Keeper of the Privy Seal
- In office 9 March 1951 – 14 April 1951
- Prime Minister: Clement Attlee
- Preceded by: The Viscount Addison
- Succeeded by: Richard Stokes

Secretary of State for Foreign Affairs
- In office 27 July 1945 – 9 March 1951
- Prime Minister: Clement Attlee
- Preceded by: Anthony Eden
- Succeeded by: Herbert Morrison

Minister of Labour and National Service
- In office 13 May 1940 – 23 May 1945
- Prime Minister: Winston Churchill
- Preceded by: Ernest Brown
- Succeeded by: Rab Butler

Member of Parliament for Woolwich East
- In office 23 February 1950 – 14 April 1951
- Preceded by: George Hicks
- Succeeded by: Christopher Mayhew

Member of Parliament for Wandsworth Central
- In office 22 June 1940 – 3 February 1950
- Preceded by: Harry Nathan
- Succeeded by: Richard Adams

General Secretary of the Transport and General Workers' Union
- In office 1 January 1922 – 27 July 1945
- Preceded by: Office established
- Succeeded by: Arthur Deakin

Personal details
- Born: 9 March 1881 Winsford, Somerset, England
- Died: 14 April 1951 (aged 70) London, England
- Party: Labour
- Spouse: Florence Anne Townley (m. 1906)
- Children: 1

Ernest Bevin (9 March 1881 – 14 April 1951) was a British statesman, trade union leader and Labour Party politician. He co-founded and served as General Secretary of the powerful Transport and General Workers' Union from 1922 to 1940 and served as Minister of Labour and National Service in the wartime coalition government. He succeeded in maximising the British labour supply for both the armed services and domestic industrial production with a minimum of strikes and disruption.

His most important role came as Foreign Secretary in the post-war Labour government, 1945–1951. He secured Marshall Aid, strongly opposed communism and was the main drive behind the creation of NATO. Bevin was also instrumental to the founding of the Information Research Department (IRD), a secret propaganda wing of the British Foreign Office, which specialised in disinformation, anti-communism and pro-colonial propaganda. Bevin played an important role in the end of the Mandate of Palestine and was strongly opposed to the establishment of the State of Israel. His biographer Alan Bullock said that Bevin "stands as the last of the line of foreign secretaries in the tradition created by Castlereagh, Canning and Palmerston in the first half of the 19th century".

== Early life ==
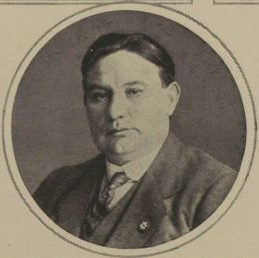
Bevin in 1920

Bevin was born in the village of Winsford in Somerset, England, the seventh child of Diana Bevin, who since 1877 had described herself as a widow. Bevin never knew who his father was, but it is now thought to have been William Pearse (1816/17–1891). After his mother's death in 1889, the young Bevin lived with his half-sister's family and moved to Copplestone in Devon. He had little formal education; he had briefly attended two village schools and then Hayward's School, Crediton, starting in 1890 and leaving in 1892. Subsequently he attended Sunday Adult School Movement classes and some evening classes. He later recalled being asked as a child to read the newspaper aloud for the benefit of adults in his family who were illiterate.

At the age of 11, Bevin went to work as a labourer, then as a lorry driver in Bristol, where he joined the Bristol Socialist Society, affiliated with the Social Democratic Federation (SDF). Spotted as a talented organiser by Harry Orbell, he became secretary of the Bristol branch of the Dock, Wharf, Riverside and General Labourers' Union in 1910, and in 1914 he became a national organiser for the union, succeeding Orbell.

Bevin was a large, strong man, and by the time of his political prominence, he was very heavy. He spoke with such a strong West Country accent that on one occasion, listeners at Cabinet had difficulty in deciding whether he was talking about "Hugh and Nye (Gaitskell and Bevan)" or "you and I". He had developed his oratorical skills from his time as a Baptist lay preacher, which he had given up as a profession to become a full-time labour activist.

Bevin married Florence Townley, daughter of a wine taster at a Bristol wine merchants. They had one child, a daughter, Queenie Mildred Wynne (6 May 1911 – 31 January 2000). Florence Bevin (died 1968) was appointed Dame Commander of the Order of the British Empire (DBE) in 1952.

== Transport and General Workers' Union ==
In 1922, Bevin was one of the founding leaders of the Transport and General Workers' Union (TGWU), a merger of fourteen unions with a combined membership of 300,000, which, by the 1930s after several more mergers became Britain's largest trade union. Upon his election as the union's General Secretary, he became one of the country's leading labour leaders and the strongest union advocate within the Labour Party. Politically, he was on the right wing of the Labour Party. He was strongly opposed to communism and direct action. His opponents claimed that was partly because of antisemitic paranoia, which made him see communism as a "Jewish plot" against Britain. He took part in the British General Strike in 1926 but without enthusiasm.

Bevin had no great faith in parliamentary politics but had nevertheless been a member of the Labour Party from the time of its formation, and he unsuccessfully fought Bristol Central at the 1918 general election. He was defeated by the Coalition Conservative Thomas Inskip. He had poor relations with the first Labour Prime Minister, Ramsay MacDonald, and was not surprised when MacDonald formed a National Government with the Conservatives during the economic crisis of 1931 for which MacDonald was expelled from the Labour Party.

At the 1931 general election, Bevin was persuaded by the remaining leaders of the Labour Party to contest Gateshead on the understanding that if successful he would remain as general secretary of the TGWU. The National Government won a landslide, which resulted in Gateshead being lost by a large margin to the Liberal National Thomas Magnay.

Bevin was a trade unionist who believed in getting material benefits for his members through direct negotiations with strike action to be used as a last resort. During the late 1930s, for instance, Bevin helped to instigate a successful campaign by the Trades Union Congress to extend paid holidays to a wider proportion of the workforce. That culminated in the Holidays with Pay Act 1938, which extended entitlement to paid holidays to about 11 million workers by June 1939.

== Foreign policy interests ==
During the 1930s, with the Labour Party split and weakened, Bevin co-operated with the Conservative-dominated National Government on practical issues, but during that period, he became increasingly involved in foreign policy. He was a firm opponent of fascism and of the British appeasement of the fascist powers. In 1935, arguing that Fascist Italy should be punished by sanctions for its recent invasion of Abyssinia, he made a blistering attack on the pacifists in the Labour Party and accused the Labour leader George Lansbury at the Party Conference of "hawking his conscience around" and of asking to be told what to do with it. Bevin's efforts to promote sanctions were successful, with an overwhelming majority of delegates voting in favour of sanctions.

After the vote at the conference, Lansbury resigned and was replaced as leader by his deputy, Clement Attlee, who, along with Lansbury and Stafford Cripps, had been one of only three former Labour Ministers to be re-elected under that party label at the 1931 general election. After the November 1935 general election, Herbert Morrison, who was newly returned to Parliament, challenged Attlee for the leadership but was defeated. In later years, Bevin gave Attlee, whom he privately referred to as "little Clem", staunch support, especially in 1947, when Morrison and Cripps led further intrigue against Attlee.

Bevin was a member of the British delegation to the second British Commonwealth Relations conference. It was held at Lapstone, Sydney, Australia in 1938 organised by Chatham House and the Australian Institute of International Affairs with delegations from all the then existing Commonwealth countries.

== Wartime Minister of Labour ==
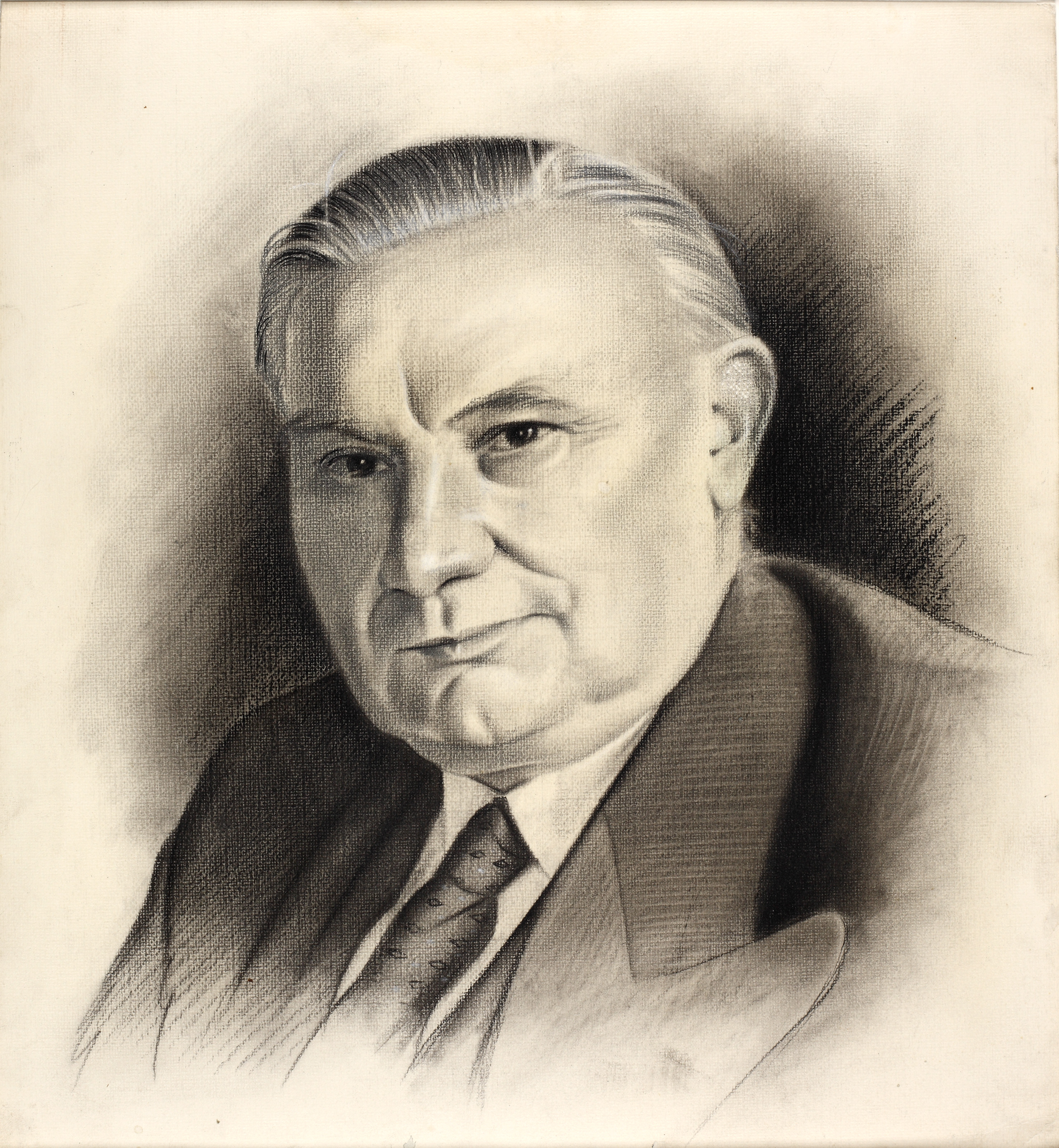
Sketch of Bevin commissioned by the Ministry of Information during the Second World War

In 1940, Winston Churchill formed an all-party coalition government to run the country during the Second World War. Churchill was impressed by Bevin's opposition to trade union pacifism and by his appetite for work (according to Churchill, Bevin was by "far the most distinguished man that the Labour Party have thrown up in my time"). He appointed Bevin to the position of Minister of Labour and National Service. As Bevin was not actually an MP at the time, to remove the resulting constitutional anomaly, a parliamentary position was hurriedly found for him, and Bevin was elected unopposed to the House of Commons as Member of Parliament (MP) for the London constituency of Wandsworth Central.

The Emergency Powers (Defence) Act 1939 gave Bevin complete control over the labour force and the allocation of manpower, and he was determined to use the unprecedented authority not just to help win the war but also to strengthen the bargaining position of trade unions in the postwar future. Bevin once quipped: "They say Gladstone was at the Treasury from 1860 until 1930. I'm going to be at the Ministry of Labour from 1940 until 1990," suggesting he aspired to have his doctrines remain at the Ministry of Labour as long as Gladstone's economic policies had governed the Treasury's approach. The industrial settlement he introduced remained largely unaltered by successive postwar administrations until the reforms of Margaret Thatcher's government in the early 1980s.

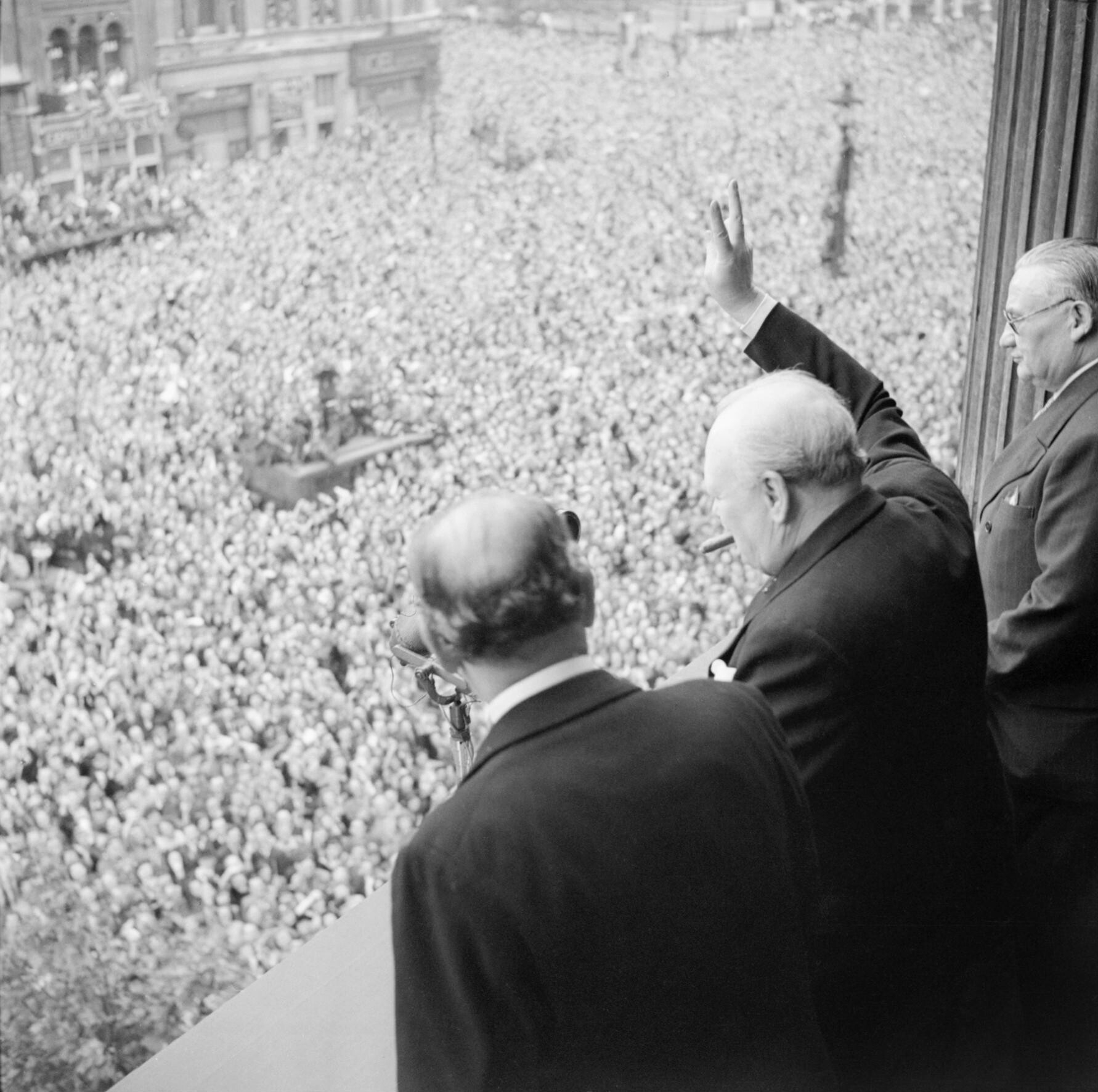
Ernest Bevin standing to the right of Winston Churchill who waves to crowds on Whitehall on VE Day, 8 May 1945, after broadcasting to the nation that the war against Germany had been won in Europe

Bevin’s wartime labour reforms guaranteed employment, wages, and welfare through the Essential Work Orders, and expanded canteens, entertainment, nurseries, and shopping facilities for workers. He promoted training for industry, the forces, and ship repair, improved conditions for seamen and miners, and secured the right of returning servicemen to reinstatement and resumed apprenticeships.

The war years also witnessed a significant extension of collective bargaining, which was directly encouraged by Bevin. By 1950, between nine and ten million workers were covered by collective voluntary bargaining. Bevin also established 46 new Joint Industrial Councils and extended the coverage of the Wages Boards between 1943 and 1945. By 1950, as a result of these changes, virtually all of the poorly organised and low-paid categories of workers were subject to state sponsored wage regulation and collective bargaining. This transformation in worker's protection and bargaining power had the definitive effect of reducing long-established local and regional wage differences.

During the war, Bevin was responsible for diverting nearly 48,000 military conscripts to work in the coal industry (the workers became known as the Bevin Boys), and he used his position to secure significant improvements in wages and working conditions for the working class. He also drew up the demobilisation scheme that ultimately returned millions of military personnel and civilian war workers into the peacetime economy. Bevin remained Minister of Labour until 1945 when Labour left the Coalition government. On VE Day, he stood next to Churchill in looking down on the crowd on Whitehall.

== Foreign Secretary ==
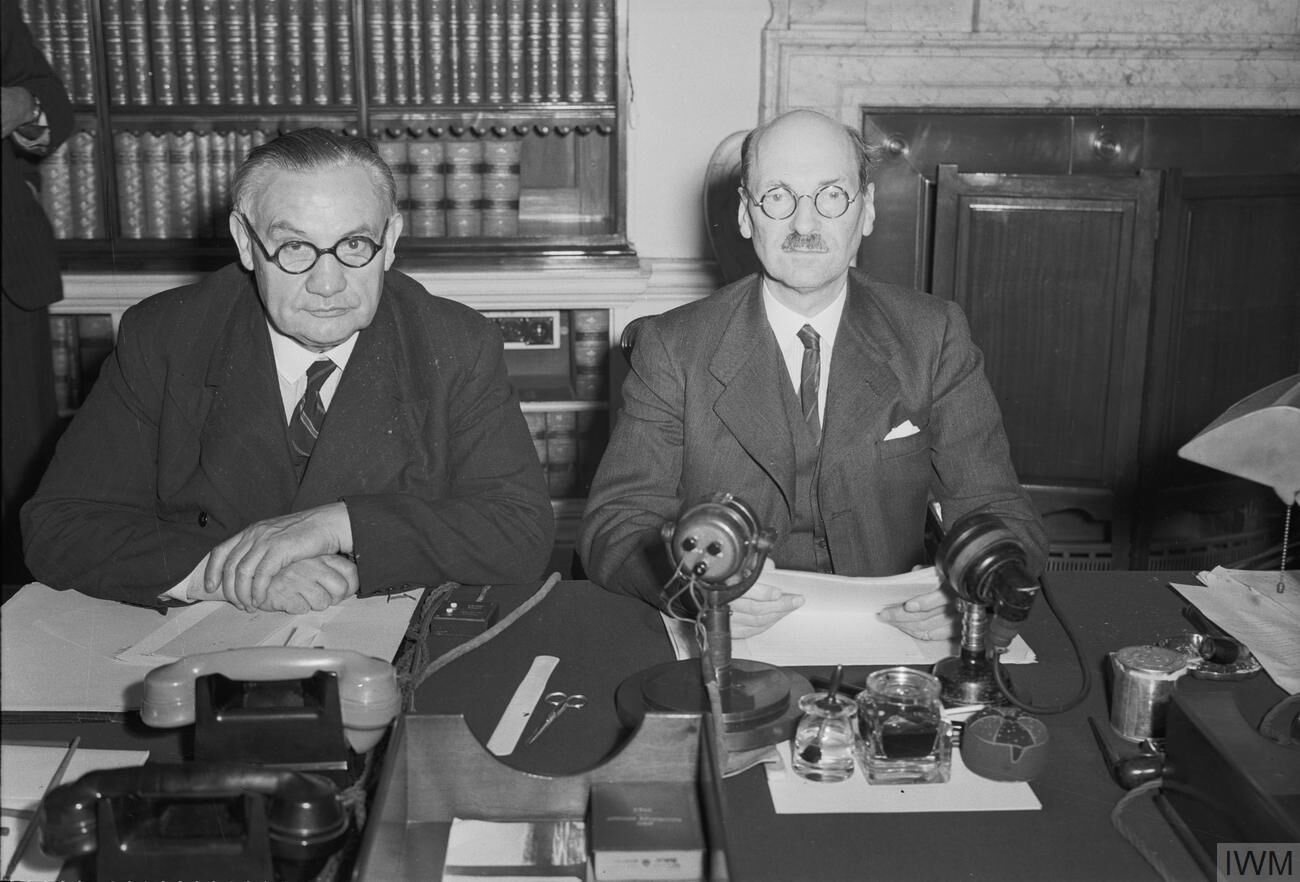
Ernest Bevin (left) with Clement Attlee in 1945

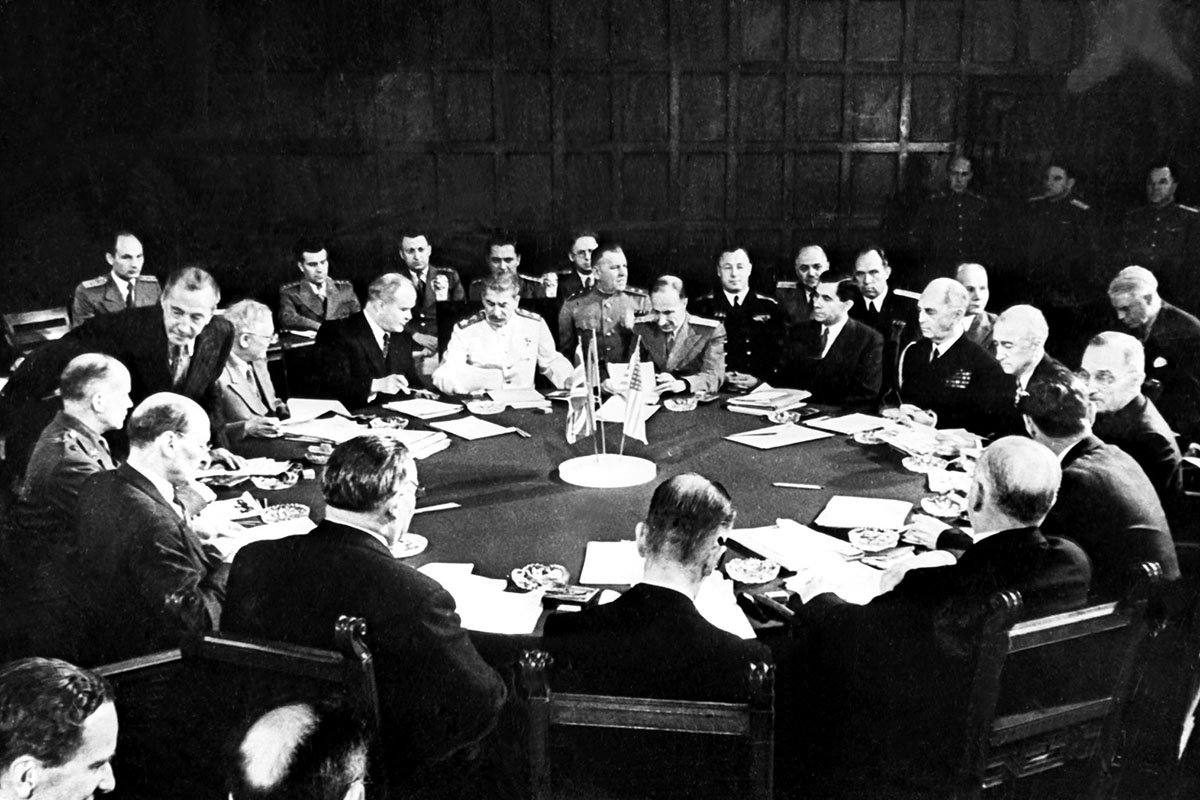
Potsdam Conference: Clement Attlee, Ernest Bevin, Vyacheslav Molotov, Joseph Stalin, William D. Leahy, James F. Byrnes and Harry S. Truman.

Following the 1945 general election, Attlee had it in mind to appoint Bevin as Chancellor and Hugh Dalton as Foreign Secretary, but ultimately changed his mind and swapped them round. One of the reasons may well have been the poor relations which existed between Bevin and Herbert Morrison, who was scheduled to play a leading role in Labour domestic policy.

Bevin at the Potsdam Conference

Diplomats were then recruited from public schools, and it was said of Bevin that it was hard to imagine him filling any other job in the Foreign Office except perhaps that of an old and truculent lift attendant. In praise of Bevin, his Permanent Secretary at the Foreign Office, Alexander Cadogan, wrote, "He knows a great deal, is prepared to read any amount, seems to take in what he does read, and is capable of making up his own mind and sticking up for his (and our) point of view against anyone". An alternative view is offered by Charmley, who writes that Bevin read and wrote with some difficulty and that examination of Foreign Office documents shows little sign of the frequent annotations made by Anthony Eden. That suggests that Bevin preferred to reach most of his decisions after oral discussion with his advisers.

However, Charmley dismisses the concerns of contemporaries such as Charles Webster and Lord Cecil of Chelwood that Bevin, a man of very strong personality, was "in the hands of his officials". Charmley argues that much of Bevin's success came because he shared the views of those officials. His earlier career had left him with an intense dislike of communists, whom he regarded as workshy intellectuals whose attempts to infiltrate trade unions were to be resisted. His former Private Secretary, Oliver Harvey, thought Bevin's staunchly anti-Soviet policy was what Eden's would have been had he not been hamstrung by the Potsdam Conference and Churchill's occasional susceptibility to Stalin's flattery, and Cadogan thought Bevin to be "pretty sound on the whole".

According to Geoffrey Warner:

Bevin's personality was a strange mixture of Jekyll and Hyde. He was adored by his officials, not only because there was never any doubt that foreign policy was made in the Foreign Office while he was its head, but also because he was as solicitous of their welfare and conditions of employment as he had been of those of his union members. His word was universally regarded as his bond and his loyalty once given was unstinting. At the same time, as even his admirers have conceded, he was long-winded, vain, vindictive, profoundly suspicious, and prejudiced against—among others and in no particular order—Jews, Germans, Roman Catholics, and intellectuals of all kinds, groups that, when taken together, comprised a large proportion of those with whom he had to deal.

=== United States ===
The historian Martin H. Folly argues that Bevin was not automatically pro-American. Instead, he pushed his embassy in Washington to project a view of Britain that neutralised American criticisms. He felt that Britain's problems were in part caused by American irresponsibility. He was frustrated with American attitudes. His strategy was to bring Washington around to support Britain's policies and argued that Britain had earned American support and ought to compensate it for its sacrifices against the Nazis. Folly considers that Bevin was not coldly pragmatic uncritically pro-American or a puppet manipulated by the British Foreign Office.

Bevin's complex position on the US is betrayed in the following quotation, which was given in response to an American visitor who asked Bevin why he had a portrait of George III behind his desk: "[He's] my hero. If he hadn't been so stupid, you wouldn't have been strong enough to come to our rescue in the War."

=== Finances ===
In 1945, Britain was virtually bankrupt as a result of the war but was still maintaining a huge air force and conscript army in an attempt to remain a global power. Bevin played a key role in securing the low-interest $3.75 billion Anglo-American loan as the only real alternative to national bankruptcy. He had asked originally for $5 billion.

The cost of rebuilding necessitated austerity at home to maximise export earnings while Britain's colonies and other client states were required to keep their reserves in pounds as "sterling balances". Additional funds, which did not have to be repaid, came from the Marshall Plan in 1948 to 1950, which also required Britain to modernise its business practices and to remove trade barriers.

=== Europe ===
Bevin looked for ways to bring Western Europe together in a military alliance at the beginning of the Cold War. One early attempt was the Dunkirk Treaty with France in 1947. His commitment to the West European security system made him eager to sign the Treaty of Brussels in 1948. It drew Britain, France, Belgium, the Netherlands and Luxembourg into an arrangement for collective security and opened the way for the formation of NATO in 1949. NATO was primarily aimed as a defensive measure against Soviet expansion, but it also helped bring its members closer together, enabled them to modernise their forces along parallel lines and encouraged arms purchases from Britain. Bevin was also instrumental in the creation of the Council of Europe, with the signature of its Statute on 5 May 1949, at St James's Palace, London, by the Foreign Ministers of Belgium, Denmark, France, Ireland, Italy, Luxembourg, the Netherlands, Norway, Sweden and the United Kingdom.

Britain was still closely allied to France, and both countries continued to be treated as major partners at international summits alongside the Americans and the Soviets until 1960. Broadly speaking, they remained Britain's foreign policy until the late 1950s, when the humiliation of the 1956 Suez Crisis and the economic revival of Continental Europe, much of which was now united as the "Common Market", caused a reappraisal.

=== Empire ===
The British Empire and Commonwealth in 1945

Bevin was unsentimental about the British Empire in places for which the growth of nationalism had made direct rule no longer practicable. He was part of the Cabinet that approved a speedy British withdrawal from India in 1947 (with the Indian Independence Act) and neighbouring colonies. However, Britain still maintained a network of client states in the Middle East (Egypt until 1952, Iraq and Jordan until 1959) and major bases in such places as Cyprus and Suez (until 1956) and expected to remain in control of parts of Africa for many more years. Bevin approved the construction of a huge new base in East Africa. Bevin wrote that, "We have the material resources in the Colonial Empire, if we develop them, and by giving a spiritual lead now, we should be able to carry out our task in a way which will show clearly that we are not subservient to the United States of America or to the Soviet Union." Colonial exports then earned $150 million a year, mostly Malayan rubber, West African cocoa, and sugar and sisal from the West Indies. By the end of 1948, colonial exports were 50% higher than before the war, and in the first half of 1948, colonial exports accounted for 10.4% of Britain's imports. After the war, Britain helped France and the Netherlands recover their Far Eastern colonies in the French Indochina and Dutch East Indies in the hope that could lead towards the formation of a third superpower bloc. Bevin agreed with Duff Cooper, the British Ambassador in Paris, that the Dunkirk Treaty would be a step in this direction and thought that Eden's objection in 1944, when Cooper first proposed it, that such moves might alienate the Soviets no longer applied.

In December 1947, Bevin hoped (in vain) that the US would support Britain's "strategic, political and economic position in the Middle East". In May 1950 Bevin told the London meeting of foreign ministers that "the United States authorities had recently seemed disposed to press us to adopt a greater measure of economic integration with Europe than we thought wise." He was referring to the Schuman Plan to set up the European Coal and Steel Community. In May 1950, he said that because of links with the US and the Commonwealth, Britain was "different in character from other European nations and fundamentally incapable of wholehearted integration with them."

=== Cold War ===
Bevin remained a determined anti-Communist and anti-Soviet. In 1946 during a conference, Soviet Foreign Minister Vyacheslav Molotov repeatedly attacked British proposals and defended Soviet policies, and in total frustration, Bevin stood, lurched towards the minister and shouted, "I've had enough of this I 'ave!" He was then restrained by security.

He strongly encouraged the United States to take a vigorously anti-Communist foreign policy in the early years of the Cold War. This included taking a robust stance during the Berlin blockade and airlift of 1948-49, and he was a leading advocate for British combat operations in the Korean War. Two of the key institutions of the postwar world, NATO and the Marshall Plan, for aid to postwar Europe, were in considerable part the result of Bevin's efforts during these years. The policy, which was little different from that of the Conservatives ("Hasn't Anthony Eden grown fat?" as wags had it), was a source of frustration to some backbench Labour MPs, who early in the 1945 Parliament formed a "Keep Left" group to push for a more left-wing foreign policy.

In 1945, Bevin advocated the creation of a United Nations Parliamentary Assembly and said in the House of Commons, "There should be a study of a house directly elected by the people of the world to whom the nations are accountable".

In 1950, Bevin offered recognition to the People's Republic of China.

=== Atomic bomb ===
Attlee and Bevin worked together on the decision to produce a British atomic bomb despite intense opposition from pro-Soviet elements of the Labour Party, groups that Bevin detested. The decision was taken in secret by a small Cabinet committee. Bevin told the committee in October 1946, "We've got to have this thing over here whatever it costs.... We've got to have the bloody Union Jack flying on top of it". It was a matter of both prestige and national security. Those ministers who would have opposed the bomb on grounds of cost, Hugh Dalton and Sir Stafford Cripps, were excluded from the meeting in January 1947 at which the final decision was taken.

=== Palestine and Israel ===
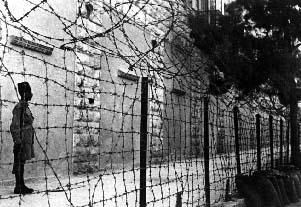
The security zone in Jerusalem was dubbed "Bevingrad" during Bevin's term in the Foreign Office.

Bevin was Foreign Secretary during the period when the Mandate for Palestine ended, and the State of Israel was created. In 1944, for the upcoming 1945 United Kingdom general election, the Labour Party had issued a statement pledging to revoke the White Paper of 1939, permit free Jewish immigration to Palestine and turn Palestine into a Jewish state. It had even advocated the population transfers of Arabs and called for the expansion of a future Jewish state's borders into Transjordan, Egypt, and/or Syria. However, in office, Bevin maintained the immigration restrictions. Wanting to protect British hegemony in the Middle East, he broke the party's promise and instead sought to follow through on the terms of White Paper. While acting mainly out of a pragmatic desire to preserve Britain's reputation in the Arab world, Bevin was an ideological anti-Zionist who believed that the Balfour Declaration had been a mistake and feared that a Jewish state would become a "racial state". His policies would spark a direct confrontation between British security forces and Zionist paramilitaries in Palestine. Bevin later told David Ben-Gurion that the Balfour Declaration had been the worst Western foreign policy blunder in the first half of the 20th century.

Bevin's stance on Palestine infuriated some members of his party. Party chairman Harold Laski denounced Bevin as "an outrageous blot on the whole Labour movement." Richard Crossman, a pro-Zionist Labour MP who knew Bevin, said the war was fueled almost entirely by "one man's determination to teach the Jews a lesson." However, Bevin's actions were backed by Attlee, who opposed the establishment of a Jewish state on the grounds it would jeopardise Britain's position as the dominant power in the Middle East.

Bevin failed to secure the stated British objectives in that area of foreign policy, which included a peaceful settlement of the situation and the avoidance of involuntary population transfers. Regarding Bevin's handling of the Middle East situation, at least one commentator, David Leitch, has suggested that Bevin lacked diplomatic finesse.

Leitch argued that Bevin tended to make a bad situation worse by making ill-chosen abrasive remarks. Bevin, undeniably a plain-spoken man, made some remarks that struck some as insensitive. Critics have accused him of being antisemitic. One remark which caused particular anger was made when U.S. President Harry Truman was pressing Britain to immediately admit 100,000 Jewish refugees, survivors of the Holocaust who wanted to immigrate to Palestine. Bevin, who refused to accept this request unless Truman sent American troops to Palestine, told a Labour Party meeting the reasons that he thought were behind the American pressure: pressure was being applied because "There has been agitation in the United States, and particularly in New York, for 100,000 Jews to be put in Palestine. I hope I will not be misunderstood in America if I say that this was proposed by the purest of motives. They did not want too many Jews in New York." He was merely restating what he said had been told to him by James F. Byrnes, the US Secretary of State.

For refusing to remove limits on Jewish immigration to Palestine in the aftermath of the war, Bevin earned the hatred of Zionists. According to the historian Howard Sachar, his political foe, Richard Crossman, a pro-Zionist member of the postwar Anglo-American Committee of Inquiry into the Problems of European Jewry and Palestine, characterised his outlook during the dying days of the Mandate as "corresponding roughly with The Protocols of the Elders of Zion", a tsarist fabrication written to inflame antisemitic prejudice. In Sachar's account, Crossman intimated that "the main points of Bevin's discourse were... that the Jews had successfully organised a conspiracy against Britain and against him personally". Bevin's biographer Alan Bullock rejected suggestions that Bevin was motivated by personal antisemitism.

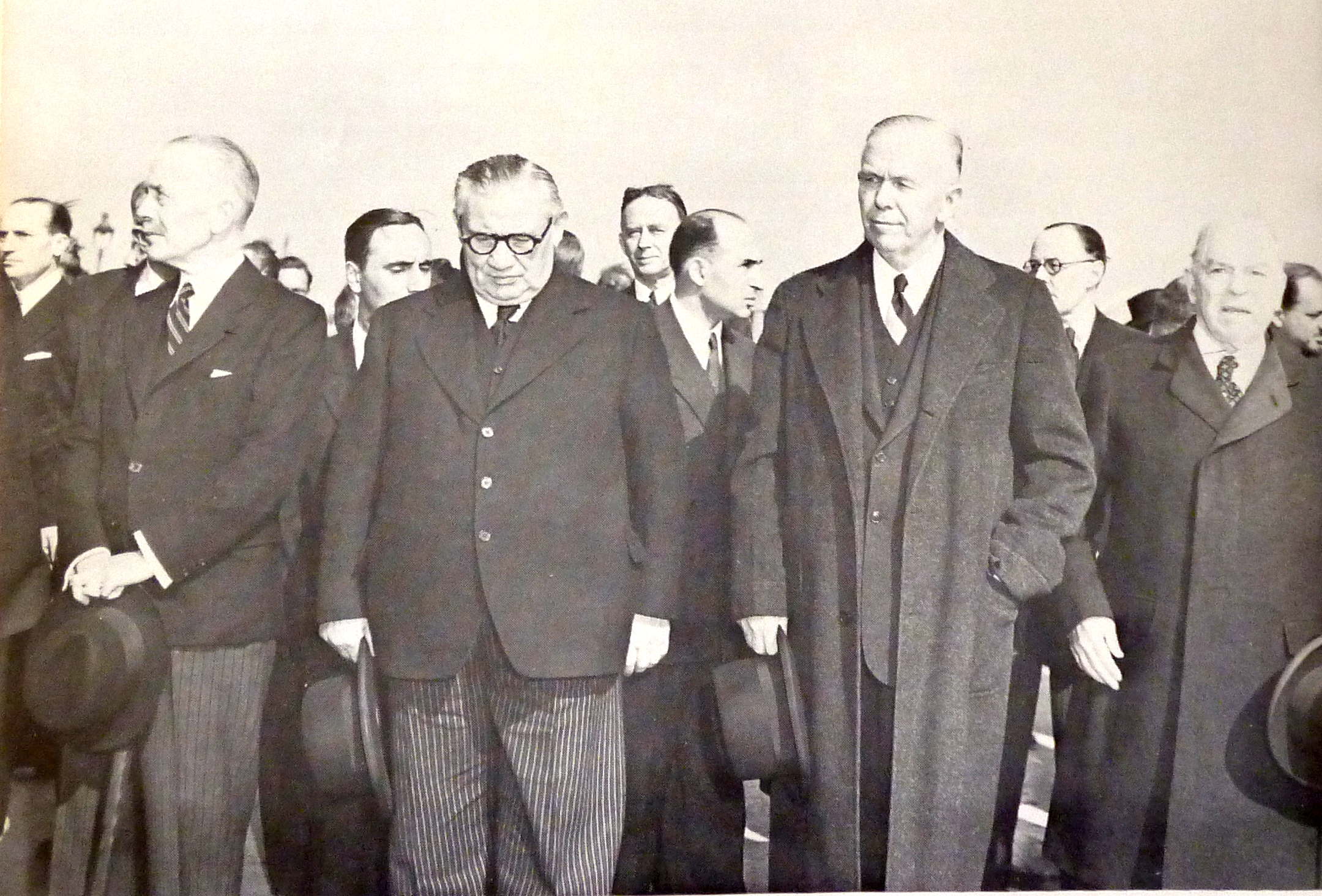
Count Folke Bernadotte's funeral September 1948: From left: Sir Alexander Cadogan, Ernest Bevin, George Marshall, William Lyon Mackenzie King.

Britain's economic weakness and its dependence on the financial support of the United States (Britain had received a large American loan in 1946, and the Marshall Plan began in mid-1947) left him little alternative but to yield to American pressure over Palestine policy. At the reconvened London Conference in January 1947, the Jewish negotiators were prepared to accept only partition and the Arab negotiators only a unitary state, which would automatically have had an Arab majority. Neither would accept limited autonomy under British rule. When no agreement could be reached, Bevin threatened to hand the problem over to the United Nations. The threat failed to move either side, the Jewish representatives because they believed that Bevin was bluffing and the Arab representatives because they believed that their cause would prevail before the UN General Assembly. Bevin accordingly announced that he would "ask the UN to take the Palestine question into consideration."

A week later, the strategic logic of Britain retaining a presence in Palestine was removed when the intention to withdraw from India in August that year was announced. The decision to allow the United Nations to dictate the future of Palestine was formalised by the Attlee government's public declaration in February 1947 that Britain's Mandate in Palestine had become "unworkable". Of the United Nations Partition Plan for Palestine which resulted, Bevin commented: "The majority proposal is so manifestly unjust to the Arabs that it is difficult to see how, in Sir Alexander Cadogan's words, 'we could reconcile it with our conscience.'"

The fighting between the Jewish and Arab communities continued to escalate until the end of the Mandate. Britain's final withdrawal from Palestine was marked by the Israeli Declaration of Independence and the start of the 1948 Arab-Israeli War, when five Arab states intervened in the intercommunal fighting. The Arab armies were led by Jordan, the most effective state, whose military forces were trained and led by British officers. The war ended with Israel, in addition to the territory assigned by the UN for the creation of a Jewish state, also in control of much of the Mandate territory that had been assigned by the UN for the creation of an Arab state. The remainder was divided between Jordan and Egypt. Hundreds of thousands of overwhelmingly Arab civilians had been displaced.

Bevin was infuriated by attacks on British troops carried out by the more extreme of the Jewish militant groups, the Irgun and Lehi, commonly known as the Stern Gang. The Haganah carried out less direct attacks until the King David Hotel bombing, when it restricted itself to illegal immigration activities. According to declassified MI6 files, the Irgun and the Lehi attempted to assassinate Bevin himself in 1946.

Bevin negotiated the Portsmouth Treaty with Iraq (signed on 15 January 1948), which, according to Iraqi Foreign Minister Muhammad Fadhel al-Jamali, was accompanied by a British undertaking to withdraw from Palestine in such a fashion as to provide for swift Arab occupation of all its territory.

== Later life ==
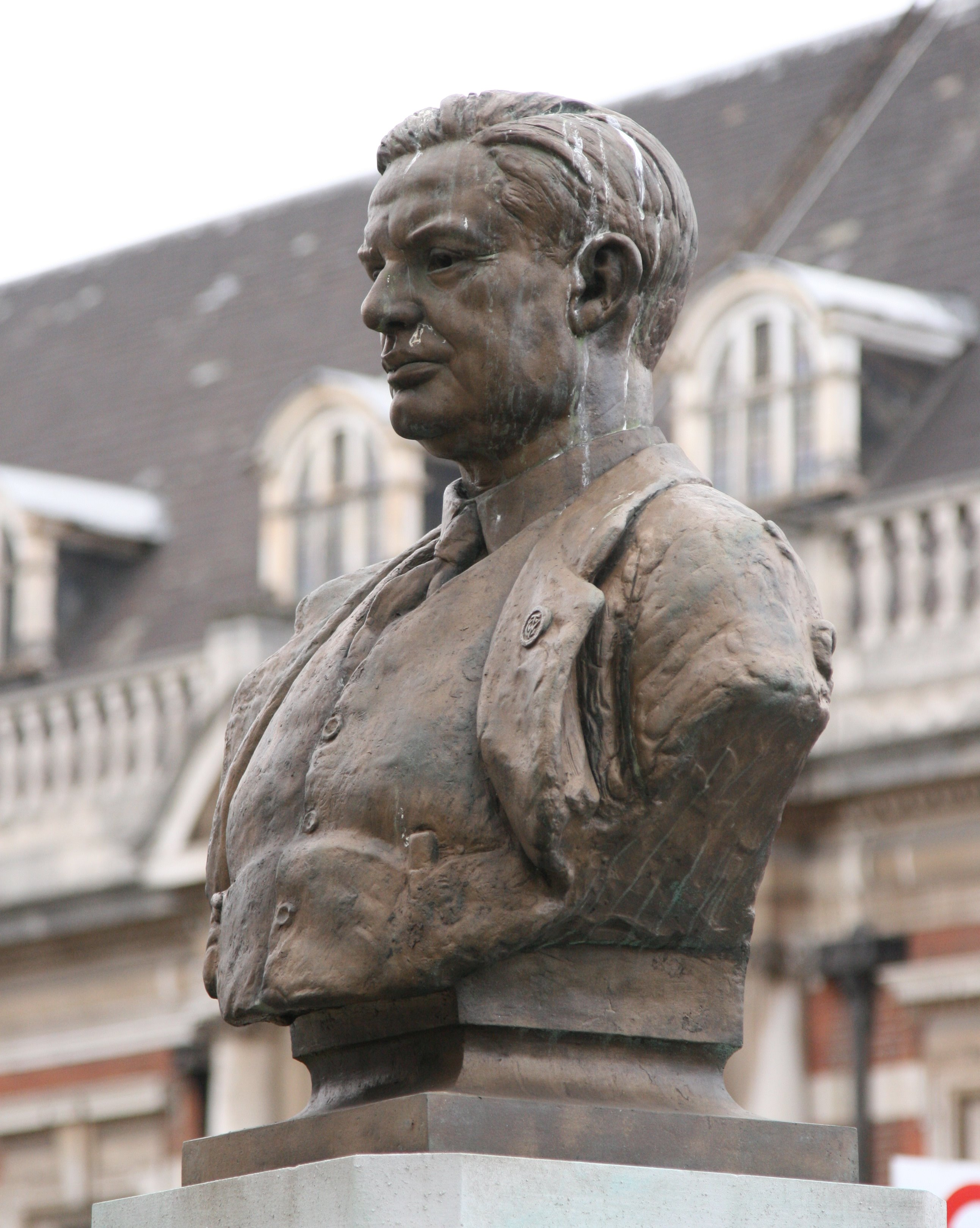
Bust of Ernest Bevin in Southwark, South London

Owing to failing health, Bevin reluctantly allowed himself to be appointed Lord Privy Seal in March 1951. "I am neither a Lord, nor a Privy, nor a Seal", he is said to have commented. He died from a heart attack in the following month, still holding the key to his red box. His ashes are buried in Westminster Abbey.

Upon Stafford Cripps's death in 1952, Clement Attlee (by this time Leader of the Opposition) was invited to broadcast a tribute by the BBC. He was looked after by announcer Frank Phillips. After the broadcast, Phillips took Attlee to the hospitality room for a drink and in order to make conversation said:

"I suppose you will miss Sir Stafford, sir."
Attlee fixed him with his eye: "Did you know Ernie Bevin?"
"I have met him, sir," Phillips replied.
"There's the man I miss."

James Chuter Ede, Home Secretary throughout the time that Bevin was at the Foreign Office (and for a few months after his death), had worked with Churchill, Attlee, Keynes and many other significant figures. When Bevin's biographer, Alan Bullock, asked Chuter Ede for his view of Bevin, he replied:

"Was he the biggest man I met in the Labour movement? He was the biggest man I met in any movement."

A bust of Bevin has been placed opposite Devon Mansions and the former St Olave's Grammar School in Tooley Street, South London. Bevin was offered many honours as his reputation grew, but declined all of them.

== Assessments ==
Martin Folly argues that assessments on Bevin as foreign secretary divide into two schools. After the opening of the British archives, historians, led by the biographer Alan Bullock celebrated Bevin as one of the great men in British diplomatic history. However, a new theory appeared in the late 1980s, portraying Bevin as a narrow-minded anti-Communist and gives more credit to the Foreign Office for the new foreign policy. In that interpretation, Bevin lost the opportunity to make Britain a leader in European affairs, and it instead became more of a tail on the American kite.

== In popular culture ==
Bevin was featured prominently in Jack Thorne's 2023 play When Winston Went to War with the Wireless, played by Kevin McMonagle.

== See also ==
- Aneurin Bevan, a rival minister in the same Labour government; he was to the left of Bevin
- Ernest Bevin Academy
- History of trade unions in the United Kingdom
- SS Exodus
- Information Research Department (IRD)

Parliament of the United Kingdom
Preceded by Harry Nathan	Member of Parliament for Wandsworth Central; 1940–1950	Constituency abolished
Preceded by George Hicks	Member of Parliament for Woolwich East; 1950–1951	Succeeded by Christopher Mayhew
Trade union offices
Preceded by Thomas Greenall and Ivor Gwynne	Trades Union Congress representative to the American Federation of Labour; 1914; With: Charles Ammon	Succeeded by Harry Gosling and William Whitefield
New title	General Secretary of the Transport and General Workers' Union; 1922–1945	Succeeded by Arthur Deakin
Preceded by New position	National Secretary (Docks Group) of the Transport and General Workers' Union; 1922–1929	Succeeded by Dan Milford
Preceded by Allan Findlay	President of the Trades Union Congress; 1937	Succeeded by Herbert Elvin
Political offices
Preceded by Ernest Brown	Minister of Labour and National Service; 1940–1945	Succeeded by Rab Butler
Preceded by Anthony Eden	Foreign Secretary; 1945–1951	Succeeded by Herbert Morrison
Preceded by The Viscount Addison	Lord Privy Seal; 1951	Succeeded by Richard Stokes
