= Rabbi Nathan =

Rabbi Nathan may refer to:

- Nathan the Babylonian, 2nd-century rabbinic sage from the Land of Israel, son of a Babylonian exilarch
- Nathan ben Isaac HaBabli, 10th-century Babylonian Jewish historian
- Nathan ben Jehiel, 11th-century Italian lexicographer
- Nathan ben Abraham I, 11th-century President of the Academy in the Land of Israel
- Nathan ben Eliezer ha-Me'ati, 13th-century Italian translator
- Nathan of Gaza, 17th-century theologian
- Nathan of Breslov, 19th-century hasidic rabbi
