= St Pancras West (London County Council constituency) =

London County Council constituency

- Former constituency for the London County Council

Former constituency
- Created: 1889
- Abolished: 1919
- Member(s): 2
- Replaced by: St Pancras South West

St Pancras West was a constituency used for elections to the London County Council between 1889 and 1919. The seat shared boundaries with the UK Parliament constituency of the same name.

== Councillors ==
Year	Name	Party	Name	Party
1889	Harry Levy-Lawson	Progressive	Herbert Raphael	Moderate
1892	William Collins	Progressive	Charles Wynn-Carington	Progressive
1907	Felix Cassel	Municipal Reform	Percy Vosper	Municipal Reform
1910	Samuel Lithgow	Progressive	William Lloyd-Taylor	Progressive
1913	Auberon Claud Hegan Kennard	Municipal Reform	Ivor Windsor-Clive	Municipal Reform

== Election results ==
1889 London County Council election: St Pancras West
Party	Candidate	Votes	%	±%
Progressive	Harry Levy-Lawson	2,800		
Moderate	Herbert Raphael	1,594		
Progressive	J. H. Allen	1,198		
Moderate	F. G. Baker	738		
Progressive win (new seat)				
Moderate win (new seat)				

1892 London County Council election: St Pancras West
Party	Candidate	Votes	%	±%
Progressive	Charles Wynn-Carrington	2,121		
Progressive	William Collins	2,068		
Moderate	F. G. Baker	1,764		
Moderate	Charles Brinsley Marlay	1,680		
Progressive hold		Swing		
Progressive gain from Moderate		Swing		

1895 London County Council election: St Pancras West
Party	Candidate	Votes	%	±%
Progressive	William Collins	2,020		
Progressive	Charles Wynn-Carrington	1,993		
Moderate	J. Head	1,744		
Moderate	R. Logan	1,727		
Progressive hold		Swing		
Progressive hold		Swing		

1898 London County Council election: St Pancras West
Party	Candidate	Votes	%	±%
Progressive	William Collins	2,404		
Progressive	Charles Wynn-Carrington	2,356		
Moderate	G. Barham	2,017		
Moderate	Hugo Charteris	2,002		
Progressive hold		Swing		

1901 London County Council election: St Pancras West
Party	Candidate	Votes	%	±%
Progressive	William Collins	2,674	29.9	+2.3
Progressive	Charles Wynn-Carrington	2,544	28.4	+2.2
Conservative	Hugo Charteris	1,869	20.9	−2.1
Conservative	Thomas Bentley Westacott	1,860	20.8	−2.4
Progressive hold		Swing		
Progressive hold		Swing	+2.2	

1904 London County Council election: St Pancras West
Party	Candidate	Votes	%	±%
Progressive	William Collins	2,889		
Progressive	Charles Wynn-Carington	2,769		
Conservative	A. F. Buxton	1,352		
Conservative	W. Smith	1,341		
Independent	G. H. Baker	125		
Majority				
Progressive hold		Swing		

1907 London County Council election: St Pancras West
Party	Candidate	Votes	%	±%
Municipal Reform	Percy Vosper	3,504		
Municipal Reform	Felix Cassel	3,471		
Progressive	H. Cohen	2,461		
Progressive	J. C. S. Hanham	2,442		
Majority				
Municipal Reform gain from Progressive		Swing		
Municipal Reform gain from Progressive		Swing		

1910 London County Council election: St Pancras West
Party	Candidate	Votes	%	±%
Progressive	William Lloyd-Taylor	3,148		
Progressive	Samuel Lithgow	3,118		
Municipal Reform	Percy Vosper	2,969		
Municipal Reform	Richard Barnett	2,876		
Majority				
Progressive gain from Municipal Reform		Swing		
Progressive gain from Municipal Reform		Swing		

1913 London County Council election: St Pancras West
Party	Candidate	Votes	%	±%
Municipal Reform	Auberon Claud Hegan Kennard	3,278		
Municipal Reform	Ivor Windsor-Clive	3,252		
Progressive	William Lloyd Taylor	2,672		
Progressive	Arthur George Rickards	2,579		
Majority				
Municipal Reform gain from Progressive		Swing		
Municipal Reform gain from Progressive		Swing		
