= Vote-OK =

UK political activist group

Vote-OK is a group of political activists which were active on the topic of hunting animals during the 2005, 2010 and 2015 general election campaigns in the United Kingdom.

Vote-OK came into being in 2005 through the efforts of Gloucestershire farmer Charles James Mann, his wife Carole (nickname 'Chipps'), and Jeremy Sweeney, a former lobbyist. Charles Mann, a longstanding pro-hunt campaigner and Beacon Co-ordinator during the Liberty and Livelihood campaign marches, ran the Action Office for the Countryside Alliance between 1997 and 2005 but was required to step down because of legislation regarding electoral campaigning.

The group stands as a single issue lobby group and is a Registered Recognised Third Party, one of only 11 in the country. Its main aim is to galvanise and organise more people to get involved in political campaigning in order to defeat any Members of Parliament who voted in favour of the Hunting Act 2004. Their tactic is to aid other candidates in any constituency where the sitting MP supported a ban in order to bring about a government that will repeal the Hunting Act. This usually means supporting the Conservative Party candidate. They did not focus efforts in campaigning against the fox hunting ban itself but provided extra volunteers during the campaigning stage of the election. They became involved in telephone canvassing, leafleting and other activities as required.

Vote-OK is a group of active campaigners which includes Lord Mancroft, co-ordinating support in marginal constituencies. Vote-OK head office consists of half a dozen people supporting Vote-OK Directors allocated to target constituencies. Liaising closely with the local candidate, the Directors role is to organise volunteers in the most effective way. Vote-OK is independent and are working with Conservative, Liberal Democrat and Plaid Cymru Candidates.

Vote-OK's rural origins as a campaign solely to repeal the Hunting Act are not emphasised, on the basis that it is not considered a 'vote winner'. As Simon Hart put it, "It would be much cleverer if we never mentioned hunting at all... We've got to go into these constituencies campaigning on health, education, crime." Both Charles Mann and Simon Hart, who stepped down as Chairman of the Countryside Alliance in August 2019 to take up a ministerial role in the Cabinet Office, confirm that there are no current links between the two campaigning organisations.

== 2005 general election ==
They targeted 139 seats (out of a total of 646 contested in the election). After the election the group claimed to have helped defeat 29 MPs as well as reducing the majorities of 21 anti-hunting MPs to under 3%, although anti-hunt groups such as Save Our Wild Animals dismissed this claim as "ludicrous". Members of Parliament who they have claimed to have helped defeat include David Rendel (Liberal Democrat) of Newbury, Peter Bradley (Labour) of The Wrekin who was the Parliamentary Private Secretary of Alun Michael, the minister in charge of handling the ban, and Helen Clark (Labour) of Peterborough. It is difficult, however, to separate out such local swings from the national swing in the election.

== 2010 general election ==
Vote-OK stated it had helped more than 30 pro-hunt MPs win or keep seats. Conservative leader David Cameron had pledged to give a free vote on repealing the Hunting Act if he won, but within the coalition that won this was not possible.

== 2015 general election ==
The Independent reported that they believed candidates Angie Bray (Ealing Central and Acton) and Ben Howlett (Bath) accepted help from Vote-OK. Alex Chalk (Cheltenham) received help from Vote-OK.

== See also ==
- Countryside Alliance
- Pressure groups in the United Kingdom
