= 1916 Derby by-election =

UK parliamentary by-election

The 1916 Derby by-election was a parliamentary by-election held for the House of Commons constituency of Derby, the county town of Derbyshire on 29 December 1916.

== Vacancy ==
The by-election was caused by the elevation to the peerage of the sitting Liberal MP, Sir Thomas Roe. Roe had been MP for Derby twice; first from 1883 to 1895 and then again from 1900 until his death.

== Candidates ==
=== Liberals ===
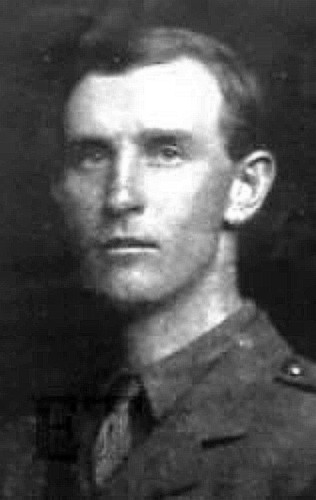
Raymond Asquith

In 1912, Raymond Asquith, son of the Prime Minister, H. H. Asquith, had been adopted as Liberal candidate in succession to Roe. Asquith had spent much of the war in Europe, but remained as prospective Liberal candidate right up to the point when he was killed in action in September 1916.

Joseph Davies

Derby Liberals favoured Joseph Davies for their candidate but Liberal Party headquarters in London was still under the control of H H Asquith, even though he had ceased to be prime minister and they issued an edict that, because of his close association with Lloyd George, Davies was not to be selected under any circumstances. Asquith’s personal secretary went to Derby to enforce this ruling. Although a majority of Derby’s Liberal delegates wanted Davies, they chose an Asquithian Liberal, Sir William Job Collins instead. Collins was formerly the MP for St Pancras West but before his political career Collins had been a distinguished surgeon.

=== Conservatives ===
There was a wartime electoral truce in operation and the Conservatives were partners in the wartime Coalition. Nevertheless their former candidate, Arthur Edward Beck, had been nursing the constituency and had fought the two general elections of 1910. He said he was content to honour the electoral truce as long as the chosen Liberal was not a purely party political nomination and if it was proposed to put the new man into government office. If the government would pledge, as they had apparently done at Sheffield Hallam recently, that the minister would retire at the end of the war, Beck stated that he would be willing to stand aside. It does not appear that the exact assurances Beck was demanding were made officially. Collins was never made a minister but he did state publicly in the run-up to the by-election that his sole policy was to give unflinching support to the government in the successful prosecution of the war and that he was willing to defer any matters of party political conflict until after the war. The Unionists decided not to stand a candidate.

== Process ==
The writ for the by-election was moved in the House of Commons on Friday 22 December. Nomination day was set for 29 December but there were no nominations except for Collins who was therefore returned unopposed.

== The result ==
Sir WJ Collins

Derby by-election, 1916 Electorate
Party	Candidate	Votes	%	±%
Liberal	William Job Collins	Unopposed	N/A	N/A
Liberal hold				

== See also ==
- List of United Kingdom by-elections
- United Kingdom by-election records
- 1886 Derby by-election
