= Harry Graham (MP) =

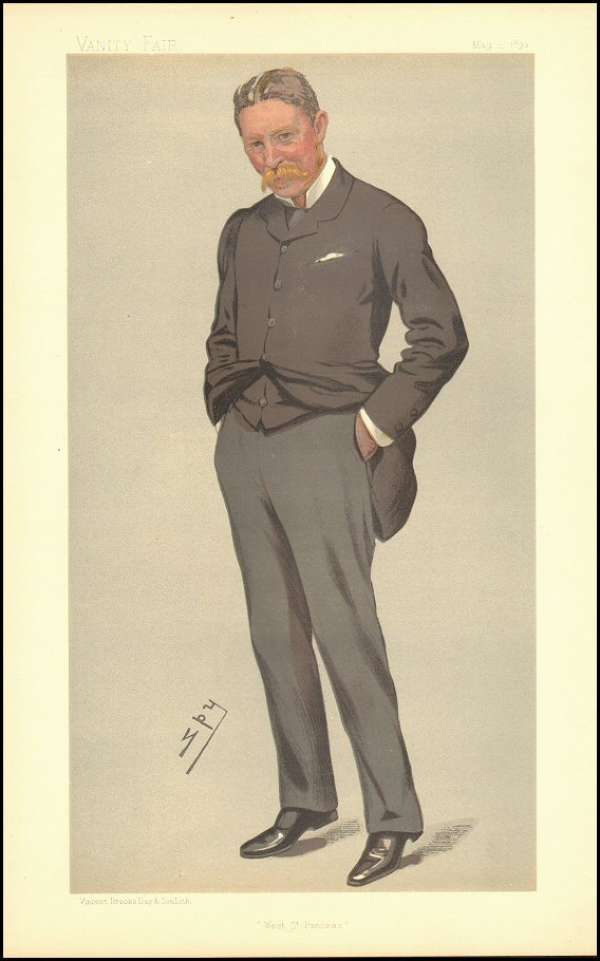
- Harry Graham MP

Member of Parliament for St Pancras West
- In office 26 July 1892 – 8 February 1906
- Preceded by: Harry Levy-Lawson
- Succeeded by: William Collins

Personal details
- Born: Harry Robert Graham; 20 February 1850
- Died: 11 January 1933 (aged 82)
- Party: Conservative
- Parent: John Benjamin Graham (father)
- Education: Exeter College, Oxford

Harry Robert Graham (20 February 1850 – 11 January 1933) was Conservative MP for St Pancras West.

== Political career ==
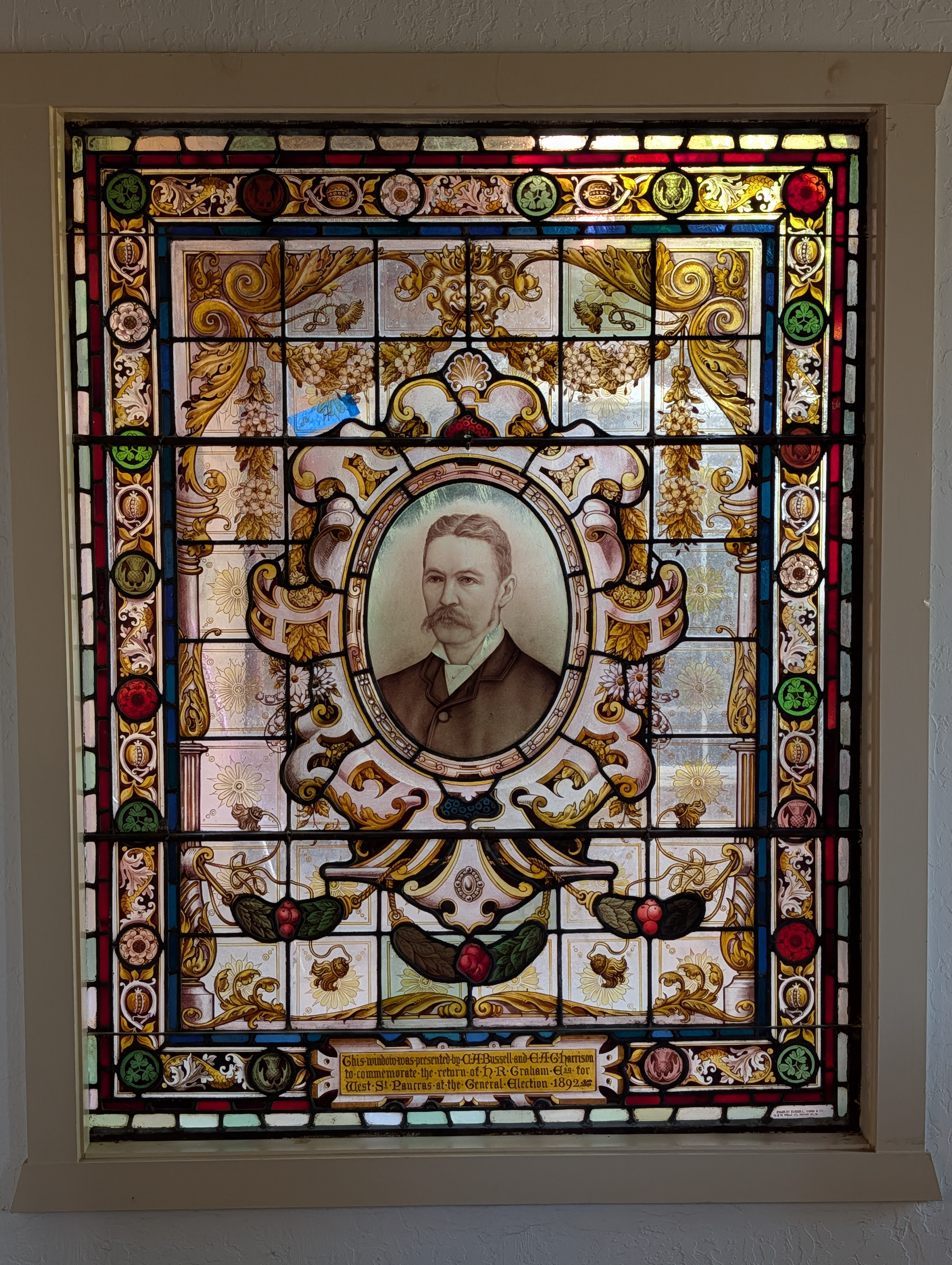
Window commissioned on the occasion of Harry Robert Graham's 1892 election to Parliament

He stood unsuccessfully in 1886, won it from the Liberals in 1892, held it in 1895 and 1900, but lost it back to the Liberals in 1906.

== Personal life ==
His father was John Benjamin Graham. He studied at the University of Oxford. He never married.

== Sources ==
- Leigh Rayment's Historical List of MPs
- Whitaker's Almanack, 1887 to 1910 editions
- Craig, F.W.S. British Parliamentary Election Results 1855-1913
