= Haydn Davies (politician) =

Member of Parliament (MP) for St Pancras South West
- In office 5 July 1945 – 3 February 1950
- Preceded by: George Mitcheson
- Succeeded by: Abolished
- Majority: 3,671 (23.8%)

Personal details
- Born: 8 May 1905 Merthyr Tydfil, Glamorganshire, Wales
- Died: 18 April 1976 (Age 71) Warwick & Leamington, Warwickshire, England.
- Party: Labour Party (UK)

Haydn Davies (8 May 1905 – 18 April 1976) was a Welsh politician. He was Labour Member of Parliament (MP) for St Pancras South West from 1945 to 1950.

== Early life ==
He was the son of Mr. A. Davies, colliery examiner and he joined the London education service in 1926.

== Political career ==
He would get involved in politics and ran as the Liberal party candidate for St Pancras South West at the 1929 General Election, when he finished third. He then switched to the Labour party, running as their candidate for St Pancras South West and won the seat with a majority of 3,671 votes. The constituency was then abolished and merged into neighboring ones and instead he ran as the candidate for York in the 1950 Election. He lost, coming second and losing to Harry Hylton-Foster. He did not run for another constituency after that.

=== Political views ===
Davies supported the BBC.

== Death ==
He died on 18 April 1976 in Warwick & Leamington, Warwickshire, England.

Parliament of the United Kingdom
Preceded by George Gibson Mitcheson	Member of Parliament for St Pancras South West; 1945 – 1950	Succeeded by Constituency abolished
