= Ann Mallalieu, Baroness Mallalieu =

British lawyer and Labour Party politician

The Right Honourable The Baroness Mallalieu KC
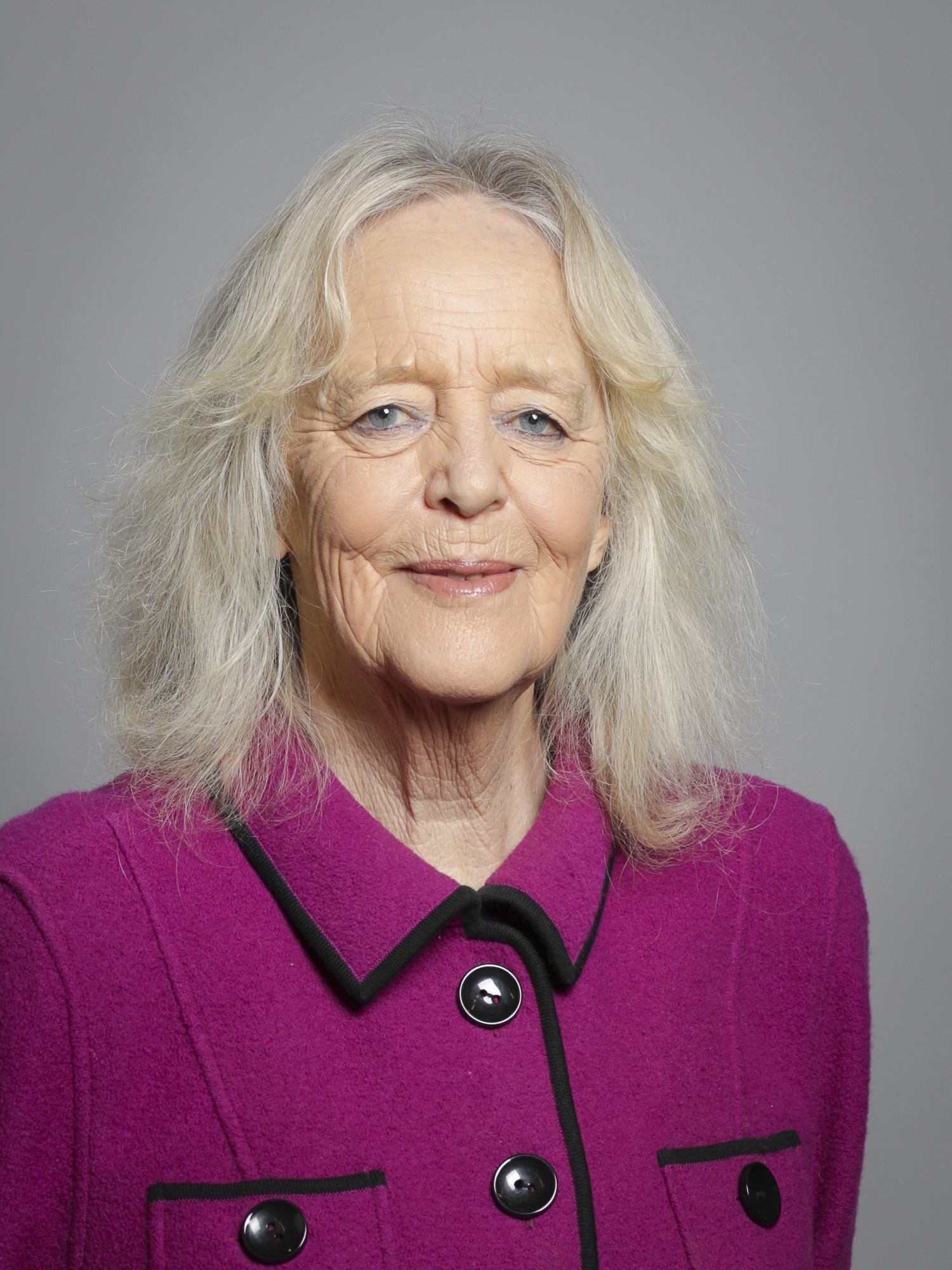

Member of the House of Lords
- Lord Temporal
- Life peerage 19 June 1991

Personal details
- Born: 27 November 1945 (age 80)
- Party: Labour
- Spouse: Sir Timothy Cassel, Bt (1979-2006)

Ann Mallalieu, Baroness Mallalieu, KC (born 27 November 1945) is a British lawyer, Labour Party politician and president of the Countryside Alliance.

== Family and early life ==
Lady Mallalieu comes from a distinguished political family. Her grandfather, Frederick Mallalieu, had been Liberal Member of Parliament for Colne Valley. He was succeeded in that seat by her uncle, Lance Mallalieu, later Labour MP for Brigg. Her father, Joseph Percival William Mallalieu (known as William), was Labour MP for Huddersfield East. She was educated at Newnham College, Cambridge, where she was the first female president of the Cambridge Union Society.

== Legal career ==
Mallalieu was a barrister in the chambers 6 Kings Bench Walk.

== Political career ==
Mallalieu fought Hitchin for Labour at both the February and October 1974 elections, but was defeated by the Conservative Ian Stewart on both occasions.

=== House of Lords ===
On 19 June 1991, Mallalieu was made a life peer as Baroness Mallalieu, of Studdridge in the County of Buckinghamshire.

In 2004, she led the House of Lords opposition to the House of Commons' proposal to ban hunting with hounds.

In a House of Lords debate on the European Union (Withdrawal) Bill on 31 January 2018 Baroness Mallalieu revealed she had voted for Britain to leave the European Union in the 2016 referendum.

== Personal life ==
Ann Mallalieu was married to Sir Timothy Cassel, Bt. They have two daughters, born 1981 and 1984. The couple divorced in 2006.

Lady Mallalieu is a member of the Exmoor Hunt and the Devon and Somerset Staghounds.

== Arms ==
Coat of arms of Ann Mallalieu, Baroness Mallalieu
Escutcheon Azure on a chevron Ermine between three fleurs-de-lis Argent four bezants on a chief Ermines a rose of the third barbed and seeded Proper. Supporters Dexter a horse Argent sinister a fox-hound Proper both gorged with a torse Argent and Azure and each statant erect on a field of stubble with a hedgerow that on the dexter having a stile and palings and that on the sinister a gate with palings all in perspective Proper. Motto Mal À Lui Qui Mal En Dit (Evil To Him Who Speaks Evil) Symbolism Fleurs-de-lis refer to Huguenot ancestry, motto cants on family name, horse refers to Inner Temple, as well as the baroness's equine charities, fox-hound to her hunting career.
