= William Carter (St Pancras South West MP) =

London politician, born 1867

William Carter (12 August 1867 – 18 August 1940) was a British Labour Party politician.

Having started work as a boy in a coal mine, Carter later worked on the railways, becoming an official in the National Union of Railwaymen.

Carter was a justice of the peace for the County of London, and a member of St Pancras Borough Council, serving as Mayor of St Pancras in 1919–20. He also sat as a member of the Metropolitan Water Board.

He unsuccessfully contested the Leyton East constituency at the 1918 general election, and next stood for Parliament at the 1929 general election, when he was elected as Member of Parliament (MP) for St Pancras South West. He was defeated at the 1931 general election and did not stand again.

Parliament of the United Kingdom
| Preceded by Richard Whieldon Barnett | Member of Parliament for St Pancras South West; 1929–1931 | Succeeded by George Gibson Mitcheson |
