= George Mitcheson =

Sir George Mitcheson
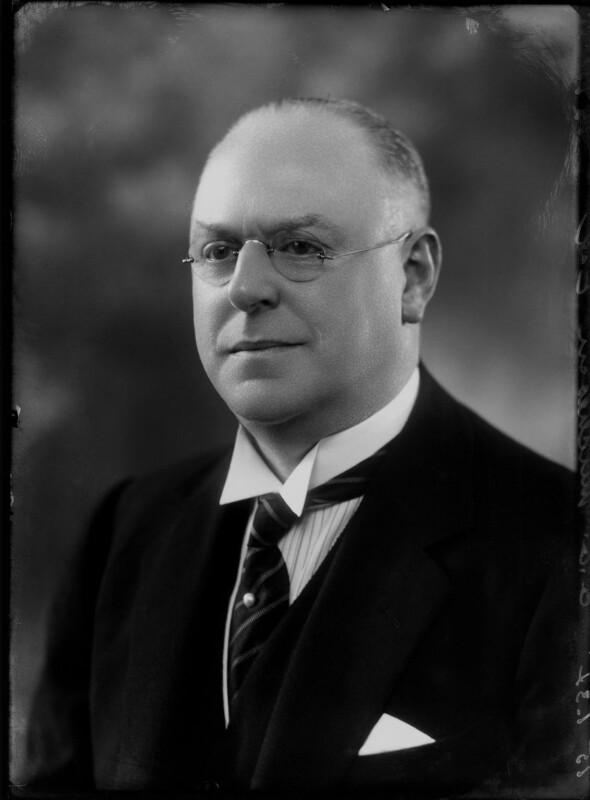
- Mitcheson in 1932

Member of Parliament (MP) for St Pancras South West
- In office 27 October 1931 – 15 June 1945
- Preceded by: William Carter
- Succeeded by: Haydn Davies

Personal details
- Born: George Gibson Mitcheson; 27 June 1883 Heckmondwike, Yorkshire, England
- Died: 18 June 1955 (aged 72) Marylebone, London, England
- Party: Conservative Party (UK)

Sir George Gibson Mitcheson JP (27 June 1883 – 18 June 1955) was a British solicitor and Conservative Party politician. He served as the Member of Parliament (MP) for St Pancras South West from 1931 until 1945 and the President of the National Chamber of Trade for the British Chamber of Commerce.

== Biography ==
Mitcheson was born in Heckmondwike, Yorkshire, the son of solicitor Thomas Mitcheson. He was educated privately and articled to his father.

== Career ==
In 1932, he was made the President of the National Chamber of Trade for the British Chamber of Commerce.

Mitcheson ran for the seat of St Pancras South West in 1931, defeating the current MP, William Carter in a landslide that saw him win a 25.8% swing, one the largest constituency swing from Labour to the Conservatives. He would then hold his seat against James Edmond Sears in the 1935 Election, albeit with a significantly reduced majority, down from around 11,000 in 1931 to only 2,400 in 1935. Then, in the 1936 New Year Honours, Mitcheson was made a Knight Bachelor for political and public services by George V. Even after he ceased to be an MP, he would continue to play a role in politics all the way until 1943 when he finally retired from politics completely.

He died at home in London, aged 71.

Parliament of the United Kingdom
Preceded by William Carter	Member of Parliament for St Pancras South West; 1931 – 1945	Succeeded by Haydn Davies
