= 1886 Derby by-election =

UK parliamentary by-election

The 1886 Derby by-election was a parliamentary by-election held for the House of Commons constituency of Derby, the county town of Derbyshire on 9 February 1886.

== Vacancy ==
Under the provisions of the Succession to the Crown Act 1707 and a number of subsequent Acts, MPs appointed to certain ministerial and legal offices were at this time required to seek re-election. The by-election in Derby was caused by the appointment of the sitting Liberal MP, William Vernon Harcourt as Chancellor of the Exchequer.

== Candidates ==
=== Liberals ===
Harcourt had been MP for Derby since 1880 when he had won the seat in a by-election. Before that he had been MP for Oxford, having first been elected there at the 1868 general election. In 1880 he was appointed Home Secretary in Gladstone's second administration and had to resign to seek re-election in Oxford. He was however narrowly beaten by his Conservative opponent, Alexander William Hall at the subsequent by-election on 8 May 1880. To enable Harcourt to return to Parliament and take up his appointment as Home Secretary, a seat was found for him at Derby by the resignation of the sitting Liberal MP Samuel Plimsoll. On becoming Chancellor of the Exchequer in February 1886, Harcourt had to resign again to seek re-election in Derby.

=== Conservatives ===
Derby was two member seat and very safely Liberal. Since the 1832 general election there had been only two occasions when the Conservatives had taken one of the two seats for the borough. Harcourt had been unopposed at his 1880 by-election and held a substantial majority over the sole Conservative candidate who had stood at the general election of 1885. Against this electoral background it is unsurprising that the Tories chose not to stand a candidate against Harcourt this time.

=== Moderate Liberals ===
It had been reported on 6 February that it was not at that point a certainty that Harcourt would be unopposed and there was talk of what was described as a 'moderate Liberal' being brought forward in support of Lord Hartington. Hartington had broken with Gladstone on the issue of Irish Home Rule, although had not yet formed the Liberal Unionist Party. It was thought however, as the day of the by-election approached, that there was not enough time to get such a candidate into the field.

== The campaign ==
The writ for the by-election was moved in Parliament on 4 February by Arnold Morley, who went on to be the new government's Chief Whip, along with a number of writs for other seats involving newly appointed ministers in Gladstone's third administration. These included Gladstone himself, Joseph Chamberlain and Henry Campbell-Bannerman amongst others.

In an election address to his former constituents, Harcourt promised to support the government of Mr Gladstone and in particular to assist in finding a solution to the Irish question. It was clear that Ireland and the consequences of Home Rule were the over-riding issue of the day, as the possibility of a moderate Liberal opponent had foreshadowed. In a further speech to Liberals in Derby, Harcourt placed his trust in Gladstone to ensure that whatever concessions were made in respect of Ireland these would not be at the expense of the maintenance of social order, the supremacy of the Crown or the unity of the Empire. As it turned out there were many Liberals who felt that, when it came, Gladstone's Home Rule Bill did not fulfil these criteria.

== The result ==
There being no nominations for any candidate but Harcourt, he was declared elected unopposed by the returning officer, the Mayor of Derby, on 9 February 1886.

== The votes ==
Derby by-election, 1886
Party	Candidate	Votes	%	±%
Liberal	William Vernon Harcourt	Unopposed	N/A	N/A
Liberal hold				

== See also ==
- List of United Kingdom by-elections
- United Kingdom by-election records
- 1916 Derby by-election
