= St Pancras South West =

Parliamentary constituency in the United Kingdom, 1918–1950

- Former borough constituency for the House of Commons
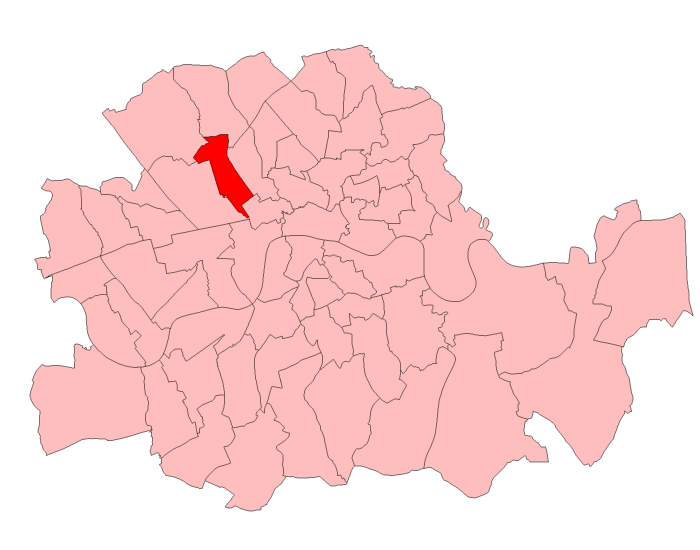

1918–1950
- Seats: one
- Created from: St Pancras South and St Pancras West
- Replaced by: Holborn and St Pancras South and St Pancras North

St Pancras South West was a constituency represented in the House of Commons of the Parliament of the United Kingdom. It elected one Member of Parliament (MP) by the first past the post system of election. It was created in 1918 by the division of St Pancras South into South East and South West divisions, and abolished in 1950.

== Boundaries ==

The constituency comprised the south western part of the Metropolitan Borough of St Pancras. It consisted of wards Four, Five and Seven, as they existed in 1918.

In 1950 the constituency was split between Holborn and St Pancras South (wards Five and Seven) and St Pancras North (ward Four).

== Members of Parliament ==
Election	Member	Party
1918	Richard Barnett	Coalition Conservative
1929	William Carter	Labour
1931	Sir George Mitcheson	Conservative
1945	Haydn Davies	Labour
1950	constituency abolished	

== Elections ==
=== Elections in the 1910s ===
Comyns Carr

General election 1918: St Pancras South West
Party		Candidate	Votes	%	±%
C	Unionist	Richard Barnett	7,119	58.6	
	Liberal	Arthur Comyns Carr	4,679	38.5	
	Independent	Joseph Charles Sherrott	352	2.9	
Majority			2,440	20.1	
Turnout			12,150	45.2	
	Unionist win (new seat)				
C indicates candidate endorsed by the coalition government.

=== Elections in the 1920s ===
General election 1922: St Pancras South West
Party	Candidate	Votes	%	±%
Unionist	Richard Barnett	8,289	49.4	−9.2
Liberal	Arthur Comyns Carr	5,533	33.0	−5.5
Labour	George Horne	2,947	17.6	New
Majority		2,756	16.4	−3.7
Turnout		16,769	57.9	+12.7
Unionist hold		Swing	-1.8	

General election 1923: St Pancras South West
Party	Candidate	Votes	%	±%
Unionist	Richard Barnett	7,097	42.0	−7.4
Labour	George Horne	5,321	31.4	+13.8
Liberal	William Charles Pilley	4,505	26.6	−6.4
Majority		1,776	10.6	−5.8
Turnout		16,923	56.9	−1.0
Unionist hold		Swing	-10.6	

General election 1924: St Pancras South West
Party	Candidate	Votes	%	±%
Unionist	Richard Barnett	11,877	57.9	+15.9
Labour	Ernest Bennett	8,630	42.1	+10.7
Majority		3,247	15.8	+5.2
Turnout		20,507	66.9	+10.0
Unionist hold		Swing	+2.6	

General election 1929: St Pancras South West
Party	Candidate	Votes	%	±%
Labour	William Carter	12,010	45.6	+3.5
Unionist	Patrick Spens	10,231	38.8	−19.1
Liberal	Haydn Davies	4,103	15.6	New
Majority		1,779	6.8	N/A
Turnout		26,344	62.0	−4.9
Labour gain from Unionist		Swing	+11.3	

=== Elections in the 1930s ===
General election 1931: St Pancras South West
Party	Candidate	Votes	%	±%
Conservative	George Mitcheson	18,737	71.4	+25.6
Labour	William Carter	7,514	28.6	−17.0
Majority		11,223	42.8	N/A
Turnout		26,251	62.5	+0.5
Conservative gain from Labour		Swing	+21.4	

General election 1935: St Pancras South West
Party	Candidate	Votes	%	±%
Conservative	George Mitcheson	13,035	55.0	−16.4
Labour	James Edmond Sears	10,670	45.0	+16.4
Majority		2,365	10.0	−32.8
Turnout		23,705	59.4	−3.1
Conservative hold		Swing	-16.4	

General Election 1939–40

Another General Election was required to take place before the end of 1940. The political parties had been making preparations for an election to take place and by the Autumn of 1939, the following candidates had been selected;

- Conservative: George Mitcheson
- Labour: Haydn Davies

=== Elections in the 1940s ===
General election 1945: St Pancras South West
Party	Candidate	Votes	%	±%
Labour	Haydn Davies	9,533	61.9	+16.9
Conservative	Lionel Heald	5,862	38.1	−16.9
Majority		3,671	23.8	N/A
Turnout		15,415	61.2	+1.8
Labour gain from Conservative		Swing	+16.9	
