= Cassel baronets =

Baronetcy in the Baronetage of the United Kingdom

The Cassel Baronetcy, of Lincoln's Inn in the City of London, is a title in the Baronetage of the United Kingdom. It was created on 26 January 1920 for the lawyer and Conservative politician Felix Cassel. He was Judge Advocate General between 1915 and 1934. Cassel was succeeded by his eldest son, the second Baronet. He died unmarried and was succeeded by his younger brother, the third Baronet. He was a barrister and judge. As of 2015 the title is held by his eldest son, the fourth Baronet, who succeeded in 2001. He is the former husband of the life peer Ann Mallalieu, Baroness Mallalieu.

== Cassel baronets, of Lincoln's Inn (1920) ==
Escutcheon of the Cassel baronets of Lincoln's Inn

- Sir Felix Maximilian Schoenbrunn Cassel, 1st Baronet (1869–1953)
- Sir Francis Edward Cassel, 2nd Baronet (1912–1969)
- Sir Harold Felix Cassel, 3rd Baronet (1916–2001)
- Sir Timothy Felix Harold Cassel, 4th Baronet (b. 1942)

The heir apparent is the present holder's only son Alexander James Felix Cassel (b. 1974).
