= 1916 St Pancras West by-election =

UK Parliamentary by-election

The 1916 St Pancras West by-election was held on 16 October 1916. The by-election was held due to the resignation of the incumbent Conservative MP, Felix Cassel to become Judge Advocate General of the Armed Forces. It was won by the Conservative candidate Richard Barnett, who was unopposed due to the War-time electoral pact.
