= Countryside Alliance =

British political organization promoting countryside issues

- Abbreviation: CA
- Formation: 1997
- Legal status: Non-profit organisation
- Purpose: Protecting rural interests
- Headquarters: Tintagel House, 92 Albert Embankment, London, SE1 7TY
- Region served: UK
- Members: c.100,000
- Chief executive: Tim Bonner
- Main organ: Countryside Alliance Board
- Website: www.countryside-alliance.org.uk

The Countryside Alliance (CA) is a British organisation promoting issues relating to the countryside such as farming, rural services, small businesses and field sports, aiming to "Give Rural Britain a voice".

== History ==
The Countryside Alliance was formed on 10 July 1997 from three organisations: the British Field Sports Society, the Countryside Business Group, and the Countryside Movement. The Alliance was formed to help promote and defend the British countryside and rural life, both in the media and in Parliament. Since then, the Countryside Alliance has campaigned on a number of issues which they believe are important to rural Britain. In 2008 the organisation was named the 'most inspiring political personality' of the last ten years by Channel 4 News. It broadly outlines its major campaigns through a Rural Charter which focuses on the following major themes:

- 'Make Brexit work for the countryside'
- 'Buy British by supporting our farmers and producers'
- 'Recognise the importance of wildlife management and the value of hunting, shooting and fishing'
- 'Connect the countryside by delivering first class digital infrastructure'
- 'Tackle crime in rural areas'

=== Campaigns ===
- Against the passing of the 2004 Hunting Ban, and lobbying for its repeal
- Against the closure of rural post offices
- Supporting shooting and deer stalking across the British Isles, by campaigning against additional regulations and negative press coverage
- Encouraging customers and supermarkets to stock food from British farms
- Calling for better broadband connections for homes and small businesses in the countryside
- Organising educational talks and trips to the countryside for schoolchildren
- A "Game-to-Eat" campaign aiming to popularise game as a meat of choice
- Fishing4Schools, an initiative aimed to help children with special educational needs by taking them angling
- Falconry for schools
- Supporting small rural businesses through the Countryside Alliance Awards scheme

== Administration ==
=== Leadership ===
- Chairman — Nick Herbert, Baron Herbert of South Downs, Conservative Party peer, former Minister of State for Policing and Criminal Justice and former Member of Parliament for Arundel and South Downs
- President — Ann Mallalieu, Baroness Mallalieu, Labour peer
- Vice President — Llin Golding, Baroness Golding, Labour peer
- Chief Executive and Director of The Countryside Alliance Foundation – Tim Bonner

==== Elected members of the Board ====
- Richard Fry
- Andrew Ogg
- James Wharton, Baron Wharton of Yarm, Conservative peer, former Parliamentary Under-Secretary of State for International Development and former Member of Parliament for Stockton South
- Johnnie Arkwright
- Caroline Squire
- Karen Silcock

==== Appointed members ====
- Tim Bonner
- Bill Tyrwhitt-Drake
- Charlie McVeigh III
- Guy Portwin
- Paul Dunn

===== The Countryside Alliance Foundation =====
- Nick Bannister, Chairman
- Charlie Wilson
- Richard Fry
- Andrew Ogg
- Tim Russ
- Tara Douglas-Home

== The Countryside Alliance Foundation ==
The Countryside Alliance Foundation is the charitable arm of the organisation. Its mission aim, according to its website, is to "help adults and children alike make the most of the incredible remedial and educational benefits of being involved in the natural environment. By introducing people to the delights of rural Britain we hope to inspire them to become passionate about the countryside, and helping to protect the natural environment."

The Foundation's core projects include the Casting For Recovery (UK and Ireland) programme, Fishing for Schools and Falconry for Schools.

=== Casting for Recovery ===
The Casting for Recovery programme was set up by The Foundation to provide women affected by breast cancer treatment with an opportunity to learn the sport of fly fishing as part of a free weekend retreat. The retreats are run by health care volunteers, qualified fishing instructors and fishing guides. The programme was established by Sue Shaw. In an article for the Yorkshire Post, the aim of the programme is stated to be "to give the women a shared, safe environment in which to discuss their illness and share experiences. They receive all the latest advice from an oncology nurse and an on-staff counsellor is also there to lend expertise on the specific fears and worries associated with breast cancer. Retreats can stir up emotions for many of the women, so the professionalism and expertise of the medics and counsellors is vital."

=== Fishing for Schools ===
Fishing for Schools was set up in 2007 by award-winning angler Charles Jardine. In a profile piece written by David Profumo for The Daily Telegraph, the programme is described as being "aimed at students in secondary education, especially those with learning difficulties, physical disabilities and a spectrum of special needs. Working alongside teachers in and out of the classroom, it explores core curricular subjects (maths, natural science, English) through the medium of angling and its range of associated skills – social, practical and interactive. It fills the gap between fun and academia." According to its webpage, the programme offers participants between the ages of 10-16 the opportunity to gain qualifications through accredited schemes run by ASDAN, COPE, BTEC and NOCN.

=== Falconry for Schools ===
The Falconry for Schools project sees birds of prey taken into primary and secondary schools, with an aim of teaching knowledge and understanding of the natural world to pupils as part of general subjects relating to history, science and technology.

== The Countryside Alliance Awards ==
The Countryside Alliance Awards is a national awards scheme set up in 2006, also known as The Rural Oscars. Its aim is to "award rural businesses that go the extra mile, who support their local economy and are unsung heroes in every community". The awards are led by public nominations, covering seven categories: village shop/post office, local food and drink, rural enterprise, pub, butcher, game and the Clarissa Dickson Wright award, which was instituted in 2013.

In 2019, the Countryside Alliance stated that it had received over 17,000 nominations. The awards ceremony is usually held in the month of June at the House of Lords. Previous judges have included Michael Gove, Andrea Leadsom, Liz Truss, William Sitwell and the late Clarissa Dickson Wright.

== Key campaigns ==
=== Tackling rural crime ===
The Countryside Alliance provides a number of guides for its members and the wider public that relate to crimes often associated as common rural crimes. These include dog theft, fly-tipping, sheep rustling, hare poaching, fuel theft as well as the impact of hunt saboteurs and online bullying.

==== Church and religious buildings crime report ====
In November 2019, the Countryside Alliance produced a report which detailed the number of crimes recorded by police forces at churches and other religious buildings in England, Wales and Northern Ireland using powers under Freedom of Information laws. Police Scotland did not comply with the request. The final report found that between January 2017 and July 2019 over 20,000 crimes had been recorded, which included lead and metal theft, general theft, violent assault and vandalism. Following the publication of the report, The Countryside Alliance issued the following public statement: "As a society, irrespective of faith or none, we need to be much more vigilant when it comes to watching over churches and places of worship by reporting suspicious activity. These figures serve as a reminder of the importance of funding and pushing for visible policing, particularly in rural areas where churches are more remote."

=== Food and farming ===
The Countryside Alliance describes the food and farming industry as "nationally important" arguing it is responsible for "generating over £108 billion a year for the UK economy and employing one in eight people. It is particularly important for our most rural areas where farming is often central to the economic and social life of the community as well as playing a vital role in conservation".

==== Campaign for 'proper' labelling ====
During the UK General Election of 2019, the organisation called for the next government to ensure food labelling showed where an animal was reared and slaughtered for all meat – including that where meat is an ingredient and part of an overall product. It argued "Country of origin food labelling must be mandatory for all processed meat to ensure a level playing field for hard-working British farmers after the United Kingdom leaves the European Union."

==== Opposition to Animal Rebellion ====
Following a planned occupation of Smithfield Meat Market in the City of London in opposition to the meat industry by animal rights group Animal Rebellion, the Countryside Alliance publicly stated that the group's activities would put the livelihoods of farmers and traders at risk. Speaking to The Telegraph newspaper, The CA's Chief Executive Tim Bonner said: "Their idea of a day out is to cause misery to others. They (Animal Rebellion) mask their political driven agenda by pretending to care about animals. They are fuelled by hatred of people and those that opt for an alternative lifestyle to them." A spokesman for the Countryside Alliance attended the occupation on 7 October 2019 to record a public video, opposing Animal Rebellion and calling on consumers to back UK farmers and sustainable meat production.

=== Campaign for Shooting ===
The Campaign for Shooting "gives a clear political and public voice to the shooting community". It lists its objectives as: to secure and enhance the long-term sustainability of the sport, and its associated land management practices, and to manage and reduce political risk at local, national and devolved levels.

On 12 August 2019, the Labour Party claimed that the financial benefits of shooting grouse were outweighed by the environmental cost and subsequently called for its review. The Countryside Alliance's Director of Shooting Adrian Blackmore stated "those with any knowledge of grouse shooting and its associated management will know that some of the claims being made by Labour are complete nonsense, and if an independent review into grouse shooting would help increase Labour's understanding of its considerable environmental, economic and social benefits, then it should be welcomed."

=== Campaign for Hunting ===
The inception of the Hunting Act 2004 on 18 February 2005 saw traditional foxhunting and other forms of hunting with hounds become restricted. According to its website, the Countryside Alliance supports all forms of legal hunting, but continues to make clear that it will oppose what they believe is ultimately a bad piece of legislation. The group has stated that the ban, brought forward by the then Labour administration under Tony Blair, is "the worst possible example of a law that was passed as an attack on a minority in society".

A proposed ban on trail-hunting and hound exercise on public land submitted by a Labour Councillor in Essex saw the Countryside Alliance campaign against the motion brought forward to Essex County Council on 14 May 2019. The motion was defeated at a meeting of the Full Council at County Hall.

Following an announcement by the Labour Party in August 2019 that it would strengthen the Hunting Act, the Countryside Alliance accused them of "reverting to class war" and said "We can't get any straight answers on what the problem (with foxhunting) is or what solutions Labour have, other than they seem to desperately want people who wear red coats and ride horses in court".

==== Boxing Day Meet ====
The Countryside Alliance promotes the annual Boxing Day Meet of registered hunts throughout the United Kingdom, using an online mapping tool. It reports that around 300 hunts meet annually, with 25 in Yorkshire alone.

=== Digital communications ===
The Countryside Alliance campaigns for better broadband and mobile connectivity in rural areas.

During the UK General Election of 2019 the group welcomed an announcement by the Conservative Party, which pledged to fast-track a plan for a 'Shared Rural Network', which the Prime Minister Boris Johnson claimed would see new masts built and existing infrastructure shared between the four mobile phone providers – O2, Three, Vodafone and EE. A CA spokesman said at the time "For far too long the countryside has been left behind when it comes to mobile connectivity."

The Countryside Alliance publicly opposed a policy announcement by the Labour Party in November 2019, which pledged to nationalise broadband and provide free full-fibre broadband by 2030. The group stated on its website that "The Countryside Alliance is concerned that Labour's proposals to renationalise BT risks delaying broadband delivery in rural areas. By removing private investment and stifling competition, especially in the most remote areas of the countryside, they will disincentivise other tech businesses from delivering innovative solutions which are so important in closing the digital divide."

== Hunting with hounds ==
The Alliance has long defended hunting and shooting, especially hunting with hounds, opposing the legislation (the Hunting Act 2004) which came into effect in England and Wales in February 2005. Amongst other causes, the Scottish Countryside Alliance campaigns against the Protection of Wild Mammals (Scotland) Act 2002, which prohibited hunting north of the border. In 2002, the Alliance organised the Liberty & Livelihood March, with almost half a million people marching through London to demonstrate against the proposed ban. The Countryside Alliance mounted a series of legal challenges to the Hunting Act 2004 which were unsuccessful.

Following the first conviction under the act, on 4 August 2006, the Alliance reaffirmed its belief that legislation was "illogical and unclear" and vowed to support the appeal against the conviction, which was later successful.

Critics of the Alliance claim that this is the sole focus of the organisation, a claim it denies, saying that this campaigning is a response to the (previous) government's "preoccupation with the issue". On BBC Newsnight on 18 November 2014, Ann Mallalieu stated: "What's actually happened to the foxes...because of the growth of commercial shooting...foxes are being shot at night by lampers...people with bright lights shooting them with guns..."

== Countryside March: Liberty & Livelihood ==
In September 2002, the Countryside Alliance organised a march in central London to promote the interests of rural Britain. It was dubbed one of the largest marches of its type in history, with the BBC reporting around 400,000 in attendance. The Countryside Alliance hailed the march as a huge success and it called on the government to make a "considered response". While a central focus of the march was to show opposition to a ban on hunting with hounds in England and Wales, a wide range of other grievances from rural communities were also being linked with the demonstration around farming. Over 300,000 people were in attendance, including Iain Duncan Smith, Vinnie Jones, Edward Fox, Clarissa Dickson-Wright, Earl Spencer, and Michael Marsham, 7th Earl of Romney.

Richard Burge, the then Chief Executive of the Countryside Alliance, said: "This is a march for the people and by the people and not simply rural people. The strength of support, not just from the countryside, but from towns and cities across the UK makes us feel both humble and proud." The British National Party had called for its members to join the march and support the countryside; however, the Countryside Alliance issued the following statement: "Everything we stand for is the opposite of what they believe in."

== Countryside Rocks ==
The organisation held fundraising rock concerts in 2006 and 2007 under the banner "Countryside Rocks" which have attracted support from musicians including Pink Floyd's Roger Waters, The Who's Roger Daltrey, Procol Harum's Keith Reid, Roxy Music's Bryan Ferry, Eric Clapton and Genesis' Mike Rutherford.

== Conflict with conservationists ==
The Countryside Alliance has previously expressed repeated concern over the governance of the RSPCA, which it argues has resulted in the charity pursuing "extremely questionable activities". In 2017, the Charity Commission announced it would be intervening, complaining that the RSPCA's standards of governance were 'unacceptably low'. In 2018, the Countryside Alliance's Chief Executive, Tim Bonner, argued that despite the intervention and recommendations by the Charity Commission, the RSPCA had not changed.

In a 2013 interview with The Daily Telegraph, the Alliance's executive chairman, Lieutenant General Sir Barney White-Spunner, called the RSPCA a "sinister and nasty" organisation and urged Alliance members to stop donating to it. The RSPCA responded by saying: "Sir Barney White-Spunner's interview shows once again how far out of touch he and his colleagues at the pro-bloodsports Countryside Alliance are with the reality of public opinion in this country." The Alliance has also criticised the RSPB and called for the sacking of TV presenter Chris Packham.

== See also ==
- Pressure groups in the United Kingdom
- Vote-OK
