= Felix Cassel =

German-born British barrister and politician

The Right Honourable Sir Felix Cassel Bt QC JP
- Portrait by Walter Stoneman, 1922

Judge Advocate-General to the Forces
- In office October 1915 – 1934

Member of Parliament for St Pancras West
- In office December 1910 – October 1916

Personal details
- Born: Felix Maximilian Schoenbrunn Cassel; 16 September 1869 Cologne, Germany
- Died: 22 February 1953 (aged 83) Midhurst, Sussex, England
- Occupation: Barrister

Sir Felix Maximilian Schoenbrunn Cassel, 1st Baronet (16 September 1869 – 22 February 1953) was a German-born British barrister and politician who served as Judge Advocate-General, the senior civilian lawyer of the War Office (and later also the Air Ministry) responsible for the administration of courts-martial, from 1915 to 1934.

== Early life and education ==
Felix Maximilian Schoenbrunn Cassel was born into a Jewish family in Cologne, Germany, on 16 September 1869. His father was Louis Schoenbrunn Cassel and his uncle was the philanthropist Sir Ernest Cassel.

He was educated at Elstree School and Harrow School (1883–1888), and won a scholarship to Corpus Christi College, Oxford, where he obtained firsts in classical mods in 1891 and jurisprudence in 1892.

== Career ==
Cassel was called to the bar at Lincoln's Inn in 1894 and took silk in 1906, practising in Chancery. He became a bencher of Lincoln's Inn in 1912 and treasurer in 1935.

In 1907, he was elected to London County Council as Municipal Reform Party member for West St Pancras, serving until 1910. In the December 1910 general election, he was elected to the House of Commons as Conservative member for St Pancras West, a seat he held until October 1916, when he resigned it by talking the Chiltern Hundreds. He had previously been defeated standing for Hackney Central in the January 1910 general election.

In 1914, he was commissioned into the 19th (County of London) Battalion (St Pancras), London Regiment, and served in France until August 1915, when he was recalled to London to assist the Judge Advocate-General. He was promoted to the temporary rank of captain on 21 June 1915. In October 1915 he was appointed Judge Advocate-General himself, despite opposition from some MPs, who were worried about his German origins. He resigned his commission on 7 October 1916.

== Honours ==
Cassel was created a baronet in the 1920 New Year Honours. On 8 June 1937, he was sworn of the Privy Council, entitling him to the style "The Right Honourable".

He was appointed an honorary fellow of Corpus Christi College, Oxford, in 1942.

== Other activities ==
Cassel chaired the Board of Trade committee on compulsory insurance from 1935 to 1937. He was a member of the Council of Legal Education from 1943.

He also took part in his family's philanthropic work, chairing the Cassel Educational Trust and the management committee of the Cassel Hospital. He was also a member of the council of the King Edward VII Sanatorium in Midhurst, Sussex. He was master of the Worshipful Company of Musicians from 1939 to 1944. He endowed three annual Cassel Scholarships at Lincoln's Inn.

He was a justice of the peace for Hertfordshire and served as High Sheriff of Hertfordshire in 1942–1943.

== Personal life and death ==
On 18 November 1908, Cassel married Lady Helen Grimston, daughter of the Earl of Verulam, who died in 1947. They had three sons and two daughters, one of whom, Josephine, married the physiologist and mountaineer Griffith Pugh in 1939. Cassel's county estate was at Putteridge Bury, near Luton. Cassel died in hospital at Midhurst on 22 February 1953 aged 83 and was succeeded in the baronetcy by his son, Francis (1912–1969).

Parliament of the United Kingdom
Preceded by Sir William Collins	Member of Parliament for St Pancras West; Dec 1910–1916	Succeeded by Richard Barnett
Legal offices
Preceded by Sir Thomas Milvain	Judge Advocate-General; 1915–1934	Succeeded by Henry MacGreagh
Honorary titles
Preceded by Sir Francis Jeune	High Sheriff of Hertfordshire; 1942	Succeeded by Sir Henry MacGreagh
Baronetage of the United Kingdom
New title	Baronet (of Lincoln's Inn); 1920–1953	Succeeded by Francis Edward Cassel
