= Richard Barnett (politician) =

British politician and Olympian (1863–1930)

Sir Richard Barnett
- Richard Whieldon Barnett in 1929 by Lafayette © National Portrait Gallery
- Born: 6 December 1863; Forest Hill, London, England
- Died: 17 October 1930 (aged 66); Camden, London, England
- Resting place: Highgate Cemetery
- Known for: Member of parliament, sportsman

Major Sir Richard Whieldon Barnett (6 December 1863 – 17 October 1930) was an Irish barrister, sportsman, volunteer officer and freemason who sat as a Member of Parliament in the United Kingdom House of Commons. He also competed at the 1908 Summer Olympics.

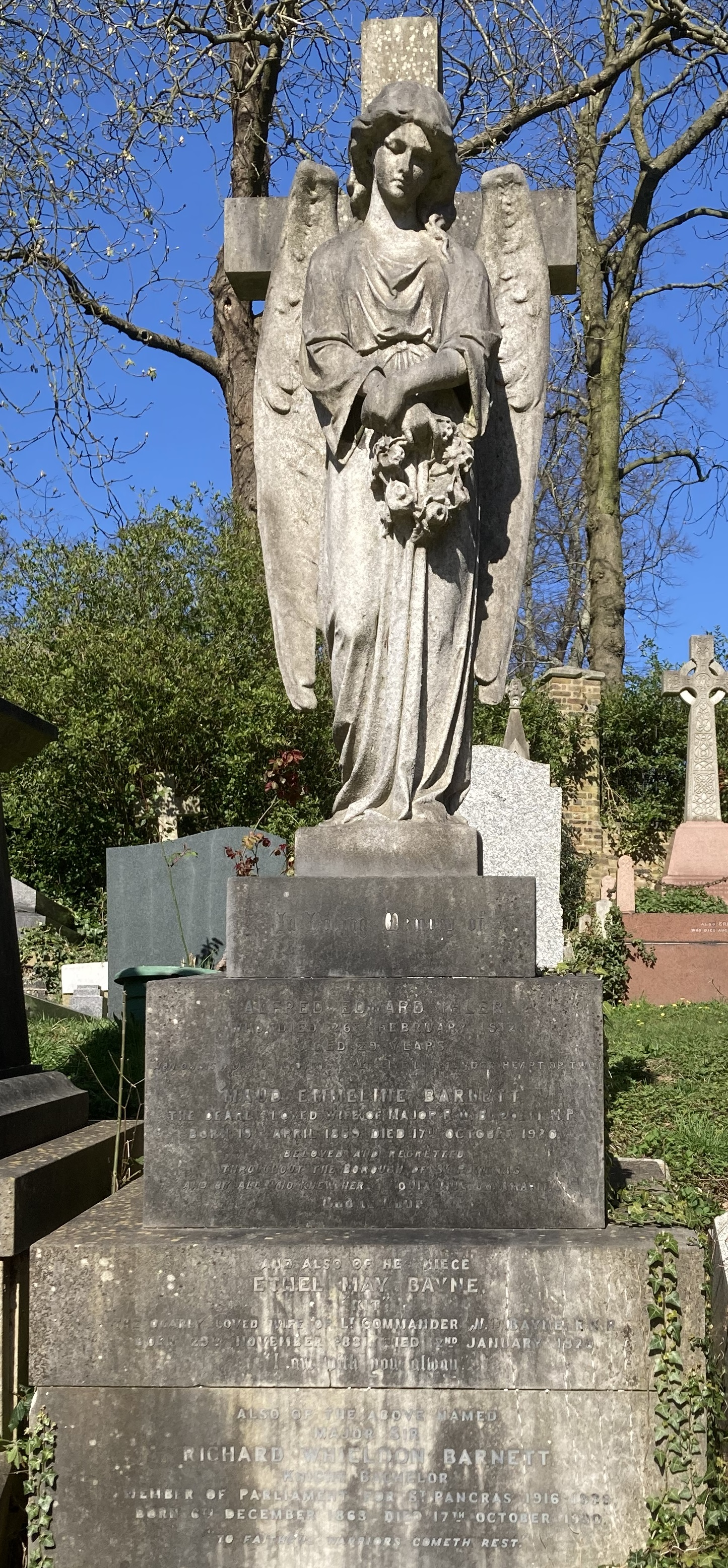
Family vault of Sir Richard Barnett in Highgate Cemetery

== Early life and education ==
Barnett was the eldest son of Richard Barnett, a doctor of medicine of Ardmore, Holywood, County Down and his wife Adela née Whieldon. He was educated at Wadham College, Oxford, where he studied classics and law. He graduated with a BA Honours in jurisprudence in 1887 and an MA and Bachelor of Civil Law in 1889. While at university, he joined the Oxford University Volunteers, a volunteer unit of the Oxfordshire Light Infantry, in which he reached the rank of captain. From 1889 to 1897, he held a commission in the 22nd Middlesex Rifle Volunteers (The Rangers), with which he acted as musketry instructor.

== Career ==
In 1889 he moved to London where he was called to the bar at the Middle Temple in 1889 and practiced on the South-Eastern Circuit.

An expert sport shooter, Barnett represented Ireland in the contest for the Elcho Shield on 37 occasions and twice made the record score. He was one of twelve competitors for the United Kingdom of Great Britain and Ireland in the 1908 Summer Olympics. He finished fourth in the 1000 yard free rifle competition. A member of the council of the National Rifle Association, he was the captain of the winning team in the Lords vs Commons shooting team at Bisley in 1921–28.

He was also Irish Chess Champion from 1886 to 1889. At Oxford, he was president of the Oxford University Chess Club and competed in a number of varsity matches against Cambridge.

On the outbreak of the First World War in 1914, he was appointed musketry officer of the 41st Infantry Brigade. In November of the same year, he became Staff Officer for Musketry for the 36th (Ulster) Division. In October 1915, he moved to the 40th Division, ending the war with the brevet rank of major.

In 1916 he was elected unopposed at a by-election as Conservative & Unionist MP for St Pancras West. Following the war a general election was held in 1918: Barnett was elected as MP for the new seat of St Pancras South West. While in parliament, he introduced the Nursing Registration Bill 1919. He joined the House of Commons Chess Circle, serving as its president from 1923 to 1929. He was involved in hosting World Chess Champion José Raúl Capablanca on a visit to the UK in 1919. Knighted in the 1925 Birthday Honours, Barnett resigned from the House of Commons at the 1929 general election.

Outside of parliament, Barnett had a number of business interests, particularly in oil companies. He was vice-president of the Institution of Petroleum Technologists and president of British Controlled Oilfields Limited. He was also a prominent freemason and a member of the Court of Assistants of the Worshipful Company of Turners.

== Later life ==
In 1892, he married Maud Emmeline Cawsey of Sidmouth, Devon. She died in 1920.

He died on 17 October 1930, aged 66, following complications after an operation and is buried in a family vault on the eastern side of Highgate Cemetery.

Barnett had been churchwarden of Christchurch, Albany Street from 1918, and in June 1931, a tablet to his memory was also erected there.

Parliament of the United Kingdom
Preceded by Felix Cassel	Member of Parliament for St Pancras West; 1916 – 1918	Succeeded by Constituency abolished
New constituency	Member of Parliament for St Pancras South West; 1918 – 1929	Succeeded by William Carter
