= William Collins (English surgeon) =

English surgeon and politician

Sir William Collins KCVO FRCS

Chairman of the London County Council
- In office 1897–1898
- Monarch: Victoria
- Lord Lieutenant: The Duke of Westminster
- Preceded by: Sir Arthur Arnold
- Succeeded by: Thomas McKinnon Wood

Personal details
- Born: 9 May 1859 Regent's Park
- Died: 11 December 1946 (aged 87) Regent's Park
- Occupation: Surgeon, politician

Sir William Job Collins, KCVO, FRCS (9 May 1859 – 11 December 1946) was an English surgeon, anti-vaccinationist and later a Liberal politician and legislator.

== Background ==
Collins was born at 46 Gloucester Road, Regent's Park, London the eldest son of William Job Collins (also a doctor) and Mary Anne Francisca (née Treacher). He attended University College School, London, and began his medical training at St Bartholomew's Hospital, where he became ophthalmic house surgeon, extern midwifery assistant and assistant demonstrator of anatomy at the medical school. His Times obituary reported that "his further progress toward the staff of the school was barred by the heterodox views he held, and freely expressed, on the subject of vaccination."

He subsequently became a Fellow, Scholar and gold medallist in Sanitary Science and Obstetrics at the University of London, graduating as BSc in 1880 and MD in 1881. He specialised in anatomy and ophthalmology, in 1918 receiving the University of Oxford Doyne Ophthalmic Medal. He served two terms as Vice-Chancellor of the University of London in 1907–1909 and 1911–12.

== Anti-vaccination ==
Collins was an anti-vaccinationist and spoke at meetings for the London Society for the Abolition of Compulsory Vaccination.

Along with Charles Creighton and Edgar Crookshank, he became one of a small number of medical critics of smallpox vaccination in the late 19th century. Collins commented that:

In vaccination we use an animal poison whose mode of action is unknown to us, and whose effects we cannot measure; and that no amount of care and caution can obviate a repetition of disasters like that which has recently shocked us at Norwich. Such being the case it is the grossest tyranny to continue the compulsory enforcement of vaccination.

He was a member of the Royal Commission on Vaccination, 1889–1896. In 1889, the Royal Commission began an examination of vaccination. Of the fifteen members of the Commission only Collins and James Allanson Picton were anti-vaccinationists.

== Political career ==
In later life he turned to politics, elected as member of London County Council for St Pancras in 1892, reaching the office of chairman in 1897. In 1904, Collins was the first chairman of the education committee, which laid the foundation of the education service in London.

He was elected Liberal Member of Parliament (MP) for St Pancras West, 1906–1910, and for Derby in 1917–18. In parliament he was particularly instrumental in promoting the Metropolitan Ambulance Act, that resulted in the establishment of the London ambulance service.

He served on various government committees, including the Vivisection Committee 1906–1912, as British plenipotentiary at the First International Opium Convention at The Hague, 1911–1914, the Sussex Agricultural Wages Committee, and the Select Committee on the Hop Industry.

He was knighted in the 1902 Coronation Honours, receiving the accolade from King Edward VII at Buckingham Palace on 24 October that year. He was later appointed a Knight Commander of the Royal Victorian Order (KCVO) in 1914, and served as Vice-Lieutenant of the County of London from 1925 to 1945.

== Personal life ==
On 2 August 1898 Collins married Jane Stevenson Wilson (1856–1936), daughter of John Wilson, MP for Glasgow Govan. Jane was a Sister at the National Temperance Hospital in Hampstead Road, north London.

Collins died aged 87 at 1 Albert Terrace, Regent's Park where he had lived since the age of two.

== Publications ==
- 1883 Sir Lyon Playfair's Logic LONDON: E.W. ALLEN
- 1883 A Review of the Norwich Vaccination Inquiry LONDON: E.W. ALLEN
- 1884 Specificity and Evolution in Disease

== See also ==
- Regent High School in Somers Town, London, formerly South Camden Community School and previously Sir William Collins Secondary School which was named after him.
- List of members of London County Council 1889 - 1919 where he is listed for Saint Pancras (West)
- List of Vice-Chancellors of the University of London

Parliament of the United Kingdom
Preceded by Harry Graham	Member of Parliament for St Pancras West; 1906 – Dec. 1910	Succeeded by Felix Cassel
Preceded by Thomas Roe and J. H. Thomas	Member of Parliament for Derby; 1916–1918; With: J. H. Thomas	Succeeded by Albert Green and J. H. Thomas
Political offices
Preceded by Sir Arthur Arnold	Chairman of the London County Council; 1897–1898	Succeeded by Thomas McKinnon Wood
Academic offices
Preceded by Sir Edward Busk	Vice-Chancellor of the University of London; 1907–1909	Succeeded by Professor Micaiah Hill
Preceded by Professor Micaiah Hill	Vice-Chancellor of the University of London; 1911–1912	Succeeded by Sir Wilmot Herringham KCMG CB
