= Pre-election day events of the 2005 United Kingdom general election =

These are the activities that were undertaken by the candidates and their political parties in the lead up to the 2005 general election.

Graph showing the averaged results of polls leading up to the election

== Events prior to the announcement of the election ==
=== Labour election poster controversy ===
In the run-up to the election, the Labour Party circulated posters it was considering using in the campaign to the subscribers of its email contact list. One of these, which was intended to support Labour accusations that the Conservatives had not fully costed their economic policies, featured the slogan "the day the Tory sums add up" together with images of flying pigs featuring the faces of the Conservative leader Michael Howard and Treasury spokesman Oliver Letwin. Both Howard and Letwin are Jewish, and the Labour Party was accused of encouraging Antisemitism; the Labour Party denied any such implication, but withdrew the posters.

A separate poster depicted Howard as a hypnotist with a watch on a chain, and the caption "I can spend the same money twice"; this was seen by some Conservatives as a depiction of either Shylock from The Merchant of Venice, or Fagin from Oliver Twist, and in either case therefore similarly anti-Semitic. The Labour Party said the poster was intended to remind voters of the character of incompetent fictional hypnotist "Kenny Craig" from the television comedy Little Britain.

=== Margaret Dixon NHS case ===
Another prominent feature of the pre-campaign was what journalists dubbed 'The Battle of Margaret's Shoulder', in which the Conservatives highlighted the case of Margaret Dixon, a Warrington pensioner whose shoulder operation had been cancelled seven times. She had written to the Health Secretary Dr. John Reid about her situation, but he had not replied, and so she looked to Michael Howard and the opposition party for help, who readily seized the opportunity to highlight a failing of the National Health Service. Soon after the matter was brought to national attention Mrs Dixon finally had her operation, but damage had been done.

=== Howard Flight ===
On 24 March 2005, The Times printed extracts from a tape recording made at a meeting of the Conservative Way Forward group in which Howard Flight, then Deputy Chairman of the Conservative Party, said that there was room for a Conservative government to make further savings on public expenditure than it was promising in its election campaign, and that the cuts that had been chosen to commit to were selected based on those that were more "politically acceptable". Flight's comments were used by the Labour Party in an attempt to justify its claims that the Conservatives were planning to substantially cut government services, which had been greeted with scepticism by the media, and Flight immediately resigned his post, eventually to have the Conservative whip withdrawn and his candidacy as Conservative MP for his seat blocked. It later emerged that the tape recording had been made by a Labour Party member who had somehow attended the meeting, giving rise to Conservative allegations that Labour was using illicit tactics.

=== Security and integrity of the ballot ===
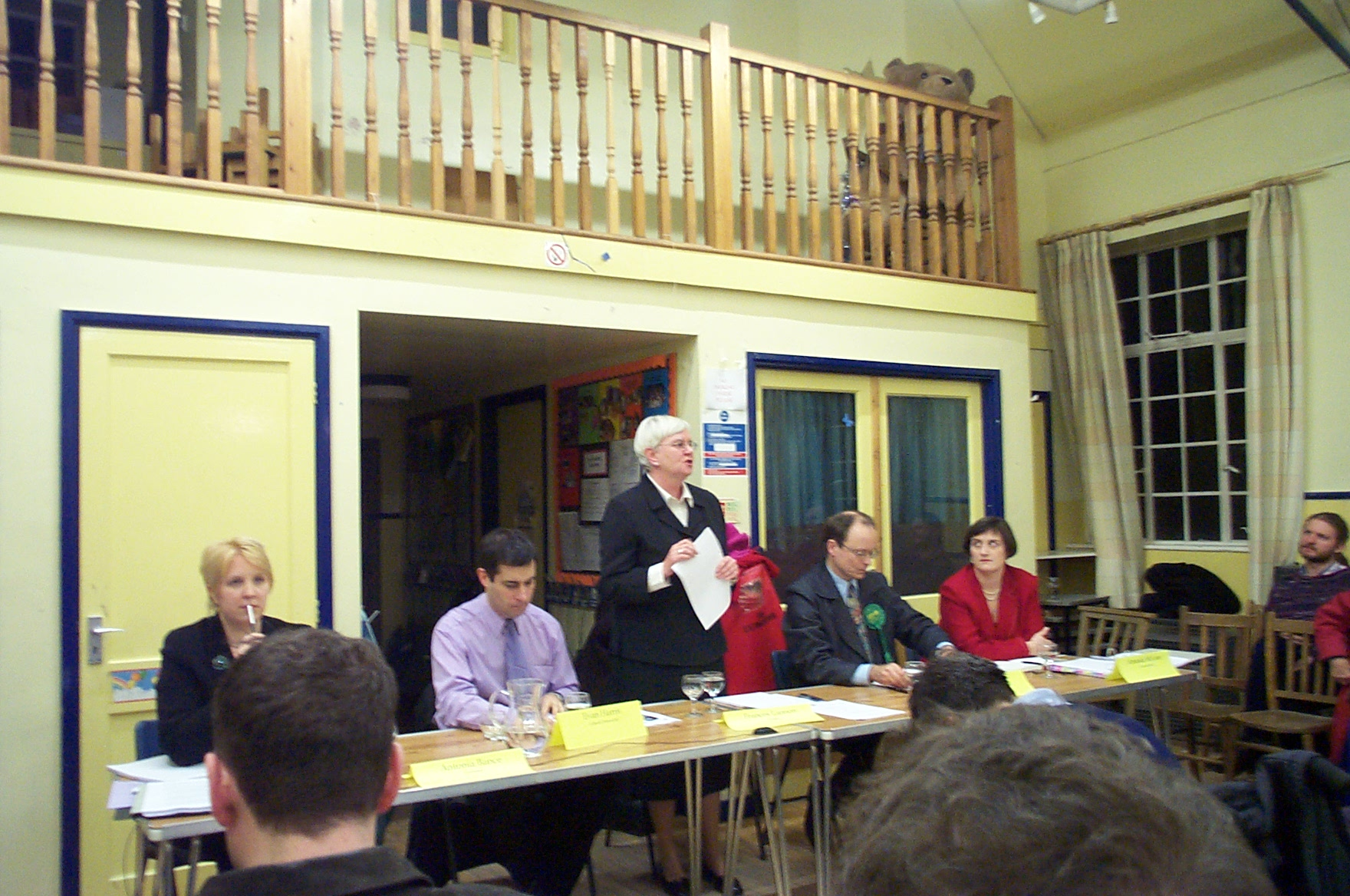
A pre-election husting at the Oxford West and Abingdon constituency, England.

The period immediately before the 2005 general election has seen increased concern about the integrity of the electoral system in Britain.

Postal voting has been permitted in United Kingdom elections since 1918. In 2001, after a recommendation by the Home Office Working Party on Electoral Procedures, the government with the support of the other parties changed the law so that applicants for a postal vote no longer had to state a reason why they were unable to vote in person, so making postal voting available "on demand".

On 4 April 2005, Richard Mawrey QC (sitting as a judge in an Election court) declared the result of two wards in Birmingham from the 2004 local elections there void by reason of "widespread fraud" in postal voting committed by the successful Labour candidates. Other local cases, most notably in Bradford, have seen accusations of postal voting frauds committed by other parties.

Mawrey stated that he found the system of postal voting to be insecure, and expressed his concerns about whether the government was intending to prevent fraud. Nick Raynsford, a Minister in the Office of the Deputy Prime Minister, told Parliament that the government would commit £10 million to improving postal ballot security.

== Events around the announcement of the general election ==
=== The election date ===
Until the introduction of the Fixed-term Parliaments Act in 2011, the dates for general elections in the United Kingdom were not fixed, being instead set by the government with a minimum notice of 17 working days, the length of a general election campaign. The only legal limitation, under the Parliament Act 1911, was that Parliament could not last longer than five years. As the previous general election was held on 7 June 2001, another election was not required until 7 June 2006. However, governments with safe majorities in the House of Commons sometimes called elections early when seeking a mandate for a change in policy, if they feared that holding the election later would adversely affect their chances of winning or if they wished to benefit from a period of weak support for the opposition. It was thus usual practice for Prime Ministers to "go to the country for a renewed mandate" (call a general election) some time after the fourth anniversary of the previous election. The Prime Minister's announcement on 5 April 2005 that the election would be held on 5 May 2005 meant that the government would be returning to the poll slightly under four years into the parliamentary term, although the previous election had been delayed by a month to take account of the foot and mouth crisis.

The date of 5 May coincided with the date set for local elections for county councils in England and local councils in Northern Ireland. The latter had originally been scheduled to take place on 18 May but were brought forward by Northern Ireland Office ministers, adding to the speculation surrounding the 5 May date. The date was suggested on 24 November 2004 by the British newspaper The Sun. The political editor of The Sun, Trevor Kavanagh, seen by many as "Mr Blair's voice in Fleet Street", had correctly 'predicted' the date of the 2001 general election for 7 June 2001 (which, similarly, was also the same date as local elections in England and Northern Ireland for that year).

=== The election announcement ===
The date of the general election had been trailed by the news media for weeks. On 5 April 2005, Blair went to Buckingham Palace to ask Queen Elizabeth II for the dissolution of Parliament. The announcement had been expected on 4 April but following the death of Pope John Paul II on 2 April the announcement was delayed by a day as a mark of respect. Instead of campaigning (as was presumably originally planned), Tony Blair attended Vespers in memory of the Pope at Westminster Cathedral on 4 April.

Normal convention dictates that the Prime Minister visits the Sovereign at Buckingham Palace, then makes a formal announcement that the Sovereign has granted a dissolution, before formally announcing the date of the election at an event later in the day. However, the first person to speak about the election was the Leader of the Opposition, Michael Howard (Conservative), followed soon afterwards by Charles Kennedy (Liberal Democrat), when they both launched their official campaigns.

Following his visit to Buckingham Palace, Blair returned to Downing Street to make the formal announcement of the calling of the election. With the session of Parliament being shortened, the government needed the co-operation of the opposition parties in order to pass its legislation. This meant that many Bills under review were scrapped, including national identity cards, and a ban on the sale of psychedelic mushrooms. Others were drastically scaled back in order to gain the acceptance of the opposition: a major crime bill passed without a clause criminalizing "incitement to religious hatred", and the proposal to allow super-casinos was passed but with a restriction that permits only one to go ahead, instead of the eight that had most recently been proposed.

The last session of Parliament was prorogued by the Lords Commissioners on behalf of the Queen on 7 April, after Royal Assent had been given to all the Acts passed in the last few days of the Parliament. The prorogation stated that a new session would be opened on 14 April but in practice this will not happen as the present Parliament will be dissolved on 11 April (it is a formality that Parliament is not prorogued without setting a time when it will meet again). In practice the new Parliament will be summoned on 11 May for the election of a Speaker and the swearing-in of Members, and will be formally opened on 17 May by the Queen.

== Campaign events between date of announcement and election day ==
The election was announced on 5 April 2005 and the election was held on 5 May 2005.

=== Ed Matts ===
Soon after the election was called, Ed Matts, Conservative candidate for the South Dorset constituency, was forced to apologise for the manipulation of a photograph from a rally campaigning against the deportation of Ugandan asylum seekers from Weymouth. The original posters consisted of a picture of the family and the slogan 'Let Them Stay', but these were changed to 'Controlled Immigration' and 'NOT Chaos and Inhumanity' respectively. The second poster in each case was held by Ann Widdecombe, a former Shadow Home Secretary. The photographs made the front page of The Times. Ed Matts has since been forced to apologise for a false claim that the then MP, Jim Knight, who held the smallest Labour majority in the UK, had supported the closure of a local school, and for the use of two Olympic sailors in campaign literature without the permission of the sailors (both of whom support Labour).

=== Closure of MG Rover plant in Longbridge ===
On 7 April the car company MG Rover halted production at its plant in Longbridge, Birmingham, due to financial problems and the company was put into administration. The government attempted to broker a deal with Chinese firm Shanghai Automotive to continue the firms' strategic alliance and buy Rover out. However, talks were unsuccessful and on 12 April the administrators, Price Waterhouse Coopers, announced that production would be wound up, the plant and its assets sold and almost all of the plant's staff made redundant. Around 5,000 jobs will be lost at Longbridge, and many more jobs in local companies and dealerships throughout the UK that had supplied the firm are at risk. Many of Birmingham's seats are currently Labour-held, but also quite marginal.

=== Birth of Charles Kennedy's son ===
The leader of the Liberal Democrats, Charles Kennedy, became a father on 12 April. The Liberal Democrat manifesto launch was delayed when Kennedy's wife, Sarah, went into hospital on 11 April. The deputy leader of the Liberal Democrats, Sir Menzies Campbell, took over Kennedy's campaign role in the meantime.

=== Party defections ===
Paul Marsden, the outgoing MP for Shrewsbury and Atcham, announced within hours of the dissolution of Parliament that he was seeking to rejoin the Labour Party and reverse his earlier defection from Labour to the Liberal Democrats in protest at the 2001 invasion of Afghanistan. Meanwhile, Labour's Brian Sedgemore (Hackney South and Shoreditch), another MP stepping down at the election and a long-time critic of Tony Blair, left the party for the Liberal Democrats on 25 April in protest at Labour's policies on Iraq, anti-terrorism laws and top-up fees.

=== Publication of Attorney General's Advice on Iraq War ===
After the summary of the document was comprehensively leaked to Channel 4 News and The Guardian, the Attorney General Lord Goldsmith's advice of 7 March 2003, on the legality of the 2003 invasion of Iraq was published in full. Opponents of the war had campaigned for the advice to be made public for some time, with many speculating that the government's reluctance to do so indicated that Goldsmith had advised that war would be illegal.

The real situation was complicated. Lord Goldsmith had concluded that "the safest legal course would be to secure the adoption of a further resolution" from the United Nations Security Council. Without such a resolution, in Goldsmith's opinion, invasion would still be legal under past resolutions 678 and 1441, if it could be proven that there were "strong factual grounds for concluding that Iraq has failed to take the final opportunity. In other words, we would need to be able to demonstrate hard evidence of non-compliance and non-cooperation" on the matter of Iraq's weapons of mass destruction.

Blair played down the importance of the advice's publication, remarking "This so-called smoking gun has turned out to be a damp squib", as it affirmed the legality of military action. Opponents of the Iraq war including Charles Kennedy, contrasted the contingent, caveat-laden advice in the document with the Attorney General's statement to the House of Commons ten days later on 17 March 2003, which stated that military action would be lawful, with no similar caveats. They speculated that the Attorney-General had been pressured by the Prime Minister to change his mind. The government denied that the Attorney-General had changed his views, stating that what had happened was that the circumstances outlined on 7 March which would make war legal had in fact occurred.

=== Party Leaders on BBC Question Time ===
On 28 April the leaders of the three main political parties appeared on the BBC's Question Time programme. Each faced half an hour of questions from the audience in turn, but did not engage in direct debate with each other; while Conservative leader Michael Howard was keen for such a debate to take place, Tony Blair refused to participate. The programme's format was agreed upon as a compromise.

The programme attracted 4.1 million viewers. One common issue for all three leaders was the war in Iraq, though all three discussed other topics as well. Charles Kennedy was quizzed on his party's plans for replacing Council Tax, Michael Howard was confronted on his party's tough stance on immigration, and Tony Blair was challenged on the use of targets in the National Health Service, such as the 48-hour targets for GPs to see patients. This last issue in particular was dealt with in more detail during campaigning over the following days.

Further regional versions of Question Time aired the following day in Wales and Scotland, with the same format, where the leaders of Plaid Cymru and the SNP were quizzed by audiences.

=== Death of Jo Harrison ===
On 1 May it was announced that Jo Harrison, the Liberal Democrat candidate for South Staffordshire, had died after a short illness. Under electoral rules, the election in South Staffordshire was postponed until 23 June.

=== Hounslow electoral register ===
On the day of the election, it was reported that up to several hundred voters' details had been accidentally deleted from the electoral register in Hounslow.

== Opinion polls ==
Opinion polls were carried out almost every day during the election campaign and were reported by all the news media. The following lists opinion polls taken.

| Date | Labour | Conservative | Lib Dem | Other | Implied Labour majority | | Pollster | On behalf of |
| Date | Labour | Conservative | Lib Dem | Other | Reported (Note: As reported in the newspaper article) | Calculated (Note: As calculated on a uniform swing by Electoral Calculus) | Pollster | On behalf of |
|---|---|---|---|---|---|---|---|---|
| 3 April | 40% | 34% | 16% | 10% | ~150 | | Communicate Research | Independent on Sunday |
| 4 April | 35% | 34% | 22% | 9% | ~60 | | YouGov | The Daily Telegraph |
| 5 April | 37% | 34% | 21% | 8% | ~70 | | ICM | The Guardian |
| 5 April | 36% | 33% | 21% | 10% | ~80 | | NOP | The Independent |
| 5 April | 37% | 35% | 19% | 9% | ~100 | | Populus | The Times |
| 5 April | 34% | 39% | 21% | 6% | Hung Parliament | | MORI | The Financial Times (Note: Restricted to those who said they were "certain to vote") |
| 5 April | 35% | 34% | 22% | 9% | ~28 | | YouGov | Sky News |
| 6 April | 36% | 36% | 21% | 7% | ~4 | | YouGov | Sky News |
| 8 April | 36% | 35% | 21% | 8% | ~60 | | YouGov | The Daily Telegraph |
| 10 April | 40% | 33% | 19% | 8% | ~138 | ~144 | MORI | The Observer |
| 10 April | 38% | 34% | 20% | 8% | ~114 | ~110 | ICM | The Daily Telegraph |
| 10 April | 37% | 35% | 21% | 7% | ~70 | ~86 | YouGov | The Sunday Times |
| 11 April | 36% | 36% | 20% | 8% | ~52 | ~44 | YouGov | The Daily Telegraph |
| 12 April | 38% | 32% | 21% | 9% | ~134 | ~136 | NOP | The Independent |
| 13 April | 39% | 35% | 21% | 5% | 100+ | ~112 | MORI | Evening Standard |
| 14 April | 39% | 33% | 21% | 7% | 120+ | ~136 | ICM | The Guardian |
| 15 April | 38% | 33% | 22% | 7% | ~116 | ~116 | YouGov | The Daily Telegraph |
| 17 April | 36% | 35% | 23% | 6% | nearly 50 | ~58 | YouGov | The Sunday Times |
| 17 April | 40% | 34% | 20% | 6% | | ~138 | Communicate Research | The Independent on Sunday |
| 17 April | 40% | 30% | 22% | 8% | ~158 | ~158 | ICM | The Sunday Telegraph |
| 18 April | 41% | 33% | 20% | 6% | | ~148 | ICM | The Daily Mirror / GMTV |
| 19 April | 37% | 32% | 21% | 10% | ~122 | ~116 | NOP | The Independent |
| 19 April | 40% | 31% | 21% | 8% | 100+ | ~156 | Populus | The Times |
| 19 April | 36% | 32% | 23% | 9% | ~92 | ~100 | YouGov | The Daily Telegraph |
| 19 April | 40% | 32% | 21% | 7% | ~138 | ~146 | MORI | The Financial Times |
| 24 April | 37% | 33% | 23% | 7% | ~80 | ~100 | YouGov | The Sunday Times |
| 24 April | 39% | 33% | 21% | 7% | | ~136 | ICM | The Sunday Telegraph |
| 24 April | 40% | 35% | 18% | 7% | | ~130 | Communicate Research | The Independent on Sunday |
| 25 April | 37% | 33% | 24% | 6% | ~100 | ~100 | YouGov | The Daily Telegraph |
| 26 April | 40% | 30% | 21% | 9% | 150+ | ~158 | NOP | The Independent |
| 27 April | 36% | 34% | 23% | 7% | ~84 | ~82 | MORI | The Financial Times |
| 28 April | 40% | 33% | 20% | 7% | 120+ | ~144 | ICM | The Guardian |
| 29 April | 36% | 32% | 24% | 8% | ~100 | ~100 | YouGov | The Daily Telegraph |
| 1 May | 40% | 30% | 21% | 9% | ~144 | ~144 | NOP | The Independent on Sunday |
| 1 May | 39% | 31% | 22% | 8% | ~140 | ~146 | ICM | The Sunday Telegraph |
| 1 May | 36% | 33% | 22% | 9% | | ~96 | MORI | The Observer / Sunday Mirror |
| 1 May | 36% | 33% | 23% | 8% | ~92 | ~96 | YouGov | The Sunday Times |
| 1 May | 37% | 34% | 21% | 8% | ~96 | ~100 | Colin Rallings and Michael Thrasher (Note: Not an opinion poll but a calculation based on the results of local authority by-elections) | The Sunday Times |
| 2 May | 36% | 33% | 24% | 7% | | ~96 | YouGov | The Daily Telegraph |
| 2 May | 42% | 29% | 21% | 8% | | ~174 | Populus | The Independent |
| 3 May | 39% | 29% | 22% | 10% | ~146 | ~162 | MORI | The Financial Times |
| 4 May | 37% | 32% | 24% | 7% | ~124 | ~118 | YouGov | The Daily Telegraph |

== Targets ==
The below were not official targeted seats (no major party has ever published its list of targets – nor are any of them likely to: it would give away information to their opponents) but were based on the results of the 2001 election; the seats listed are the ones in which the respective party came second, ranked by the percentage margin by which they lost. In general, actual target seats are determined by more recent election results such as the 2004 European Parliament election. The incumbent party is included in brackets after the constituency name.

| | Labour targets | Margin | Conservative targets | Margin | Liberal Democrat targets | Margin |
|---|---|---|---|---|---|---|
| 1 | Boston and Skegness (C) | 1.28% | Cheadle (LD) | 0.08% | Taunton (C) | 0.43% |
| 2 | Beverley and Holderness (C) | 1.68% | Dumfries and Galloway (L) | 0.28% | Orpington (C) | 0.53% |
| 3 | South West Bedfordshire (C) | 1.77% | South Dorset (L) | 0.34% | South West Surrey (C) | 1.74% |
| 4 | Basingstoke (C) | 1.83% | Braintree (L) | 0.71% | Cardiff Central (L) | 1.89% |
| 5 | Castle Point (C) | 2.48% | Weston-super-Mare (LD) | 0.72% | Inverness, Nairn, Badenoch and Strathspey (L) | 2.65% |
| 6 | Upminster (C) | 3.67% | North Norfolk (LD) | 0.86% | West Dorset (C) | 2.85% |
| 7 | Canterbury (C) | 4.58% | Monmouth (L) | 0.86% | Haltemprice and Howden (C) | 4.33% |
| 8 | Bury St Edmunds (C) | 4.98% | Mid Dorset and North Poole (LD) | 0.88% | Isle of Wight (C) | 4.45% |
| 9 | Bosworth (C) | 5.05% | Lancaster and Wyre (L) | 0.92% | Eastbourne (C) | 4.81% |
| 10 | Moray (SNP) | 5.06% | Guildford (LD) | 1.12% | Wells (C) | 5.45% |
| 11 | Chesterfield (LD) | 5.82% | Kettering (L) | 1.24% | Oldham East and Saddleworth (L) | 6.00% |
| 12 | Hexham (C) | 5.96% | Somerton and Frome (LD) | 1.27% | East Dunbartonshire (L) | 6.29% |
| 13 | Uxbridge (C) | 6.28% | Angus (SNP) | 1.52% | Westmorland and Lonsdale (C) | 6.57% |
| 14 | Chipping Barnet (C) | 6.36% | Northampton South (L) | 1.73% | Totnes (C) | 7.30% |
| 15 | Gosport (C) | 6.59% | Brecon and Radnorshire (LD) | 2.00% | North Wiltshire (C) | 7.32% |
| 16 | Altrincham and Sale West (C) | 6.75% | Torridge and West Devon (LD) | 2.14% | Maidenhead (C) | 7.58% |
| 17 | North West Norfolk (C) | 6.81% | Hereford (LD) | 2.17% | North Dorset (C) | 7.94% |
| 18 | Carmarthen East and Dinefwr (Plaid Cymru) | 6.81% | Welwyn Hatfield (L) | 2.79% | Bristol West (L) | 7.95% |
| 19 | Wycombe (C) | 7.04% | Shipley (L) | 3.10% | Birmingham Yardley (L) | 8.59% |
| 20 | Central Suffolk and Ipswich North (C) | 7.36% | Clwyd West (L) | 3.22% | New Forest East (C) | 9.08% |

The Liberal Democrats pursued a "decapitation" strategy, targeting front bench Conservative and (to a lesser extent) Labour MPs in potentially vulnerable seats.

Targets for other parties included Bethnal Green and Bow where RESPECT hoped to take a seat, and Brighton Pavilion where the Green Party of England and Wales hoped to move into second place. The Scottish National Party's main targets were Dundee East and Ochil and South Perthshire and Plaid Cymru's top target was Ynys Môn.
