= St Pancras West =

Parliamentary constituency in the United Kingdom, 1885–1918

- Former borough constituency for the House of Commons

1885–1918
- Seats: One
- Created from: Marylebone
- Replaced by: St Pancras South West

St Pancras West was a borough constituency represented in the House of Commons of the Parliament of the United Kingdom. It elected one Member of Parliament (MP) by the first past the post system of election. It was created by the Redistribution of Seats Act 1885 for the 1885 general election and abolished for the 1918 general election.

== Boundaries ==
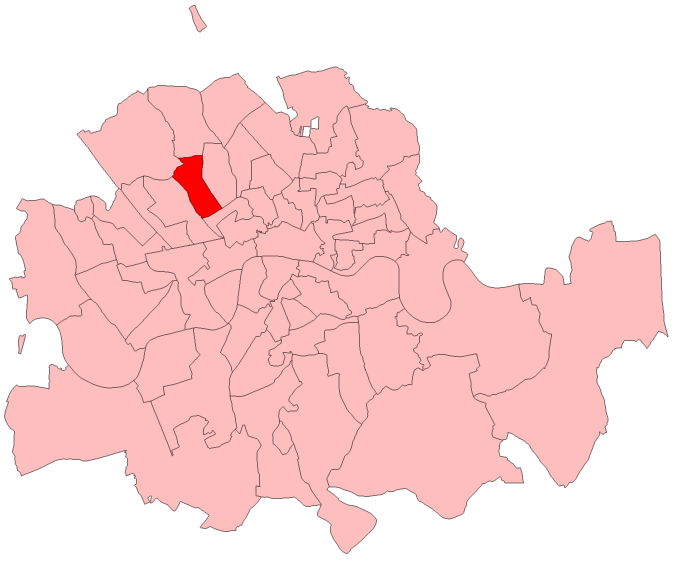
St Pancras West in London 1885–1918

== Members of Parliament ==
Year	Member	Party
1885	Harry Levy-Lawson	Liberal
1892	Harry Graham	Conservative
1906	Sir William Collins	Liberal
1910	Felix Cassel	Conservative
1916	Richard Barnett	Unionist
1918	constituency abolished	

== Elections ==
=== Elections in the 1880s ===
General election 1885: St Pancras West
Party	Candidate	Votes	%	±%
Liberal	Harry Levy-Lawson	2,954	54.3	
Conservative	Walter Haweis James	2,485	45.7	
Majority		469	8.6	
Turnout		5,439	76.6	
Registered electors		7,103		
Liberal win (new seat)				

General election 1886: St Pancras West
Party	Candidate	Votes	%	±%
Liberal	Harry Levy-Lawson	2,567	50.6	−3.7
Conservative	Harry Graham	2,503	49.4	+3.7
Majority		64	1.2	−7.4
Turnout		5,070	71.4	−5.2
Registered electors		7,103		
Liberal hold		Swing	−3.7	

=== Elections in the 1890s ===
General election 1892: St Pancras West
Party	Candidate	Votes	%	±%
Conservative	Harry Graham	2,984	50.4	+1.0
Liberal	Harry Levy-Lawson	2,942	49.6	−1.0
Majority		42	0.8	N/A
Turnout		5,926	76.4	+5.0
Registered electors		7,754		
Conservative gain from Liberal		Swing	+1.0	

General election 1895: St Pancras West
Party	Candidate	Votes	%	±%
Conservative	Harry Graham	3,104	57.7	+7.3
Liberal	William Collins	2,273	42.3	−7.3
Majority		831	15.4	+14.6
Turnout		5,377	74.6	−1.8
Registered electors		7,208		
Conservative hold		Swing	+7.3	

=== Elections in the 1900s ===
General election 1900: St Pancras West
Party	Candidate	Votes	%	±%
Conservative	Harry Graham	3,220	67.5	+9.8
Liberal	Godfrey Benson	1,553	32.5	−9.8
Majority		1,667	35.0	+19.6
Turnout		4,773	64.2	−10.4
Registered electors		7,431		
Conservative hold		Swing	+9.8	

Collins

General election 1906: St Pancras West
Party	Candidate	Votes	%	±%
Liberal	William Collins	3,230	55.9	+23.4
Conservative	Harry Graham	2,545	44.1	−23.4
Majority		685	11.8	N/A
Turnout		5,775	79.3	+15.1
Registered electors		7,282		
Liberal gain from Conservative		Swing	+23.4	

=== Elections in the 1910s ===
General election January 1910: St Pancras West
Party	Candidate	Votes	%	±%
Liberal	William Collins	3,553	50.1	−5.8
Conservative	Robert Edmund Dickinson	3,543	49.9	+5.8
Majority		10	0.2	−11.6
Turnout		7,096	82.6	+3.3
Registered electors		8,589		
Liberal hold		Swing	−5.8	

General election December 1910: St Pancras West
Party	Candidate	Votes	%	±%
Conservative	Felix Cassel	3,385	50.1	+0.2
Liberal	William Collins	3,376	49.9	−0.2
Majority		9	0.2	N/A
Turnout		6,761	78.7	−3.9
Registered electors		8,589		
Conservative gain from Liberal		Swing	+0.2	

General election 1914–15:

Another general election was required to take place before the end of 1915. The political parties had been making preparations for an election to take place and by July 1914, the following candidates had been selected:

- Unionist: Felix Cassel
- Liberal: James H. Scott

Felix Cassel's resignation on becoming a Judge Advocate General of the Armed Forces required a by-election.

By-election, 1916: St Pancras West
Party	Candidate	Votes	%	±%
Unionist	Richard Barnett	Unopposed		
Unionist hold				
