= Whitechapel and St George's =

Parliamentary constituency in the United Kingdom, 1918–1950

- Former borough constituency for the House of Commons

1918–1950
- Seats: one
- Created from: St George and Whitechapel
- Replaced by: Stepney

Whitechapel and St George's was a parliamentary constituency in east London, which returned one Member of Parliament (MP) to the House of Commons of the Parliament of the United Kingdom.

It was created for the 1918 general election, largely replacing the old Stepney constituency. It was abolished for the 1950 general election.

== Boundaries ==
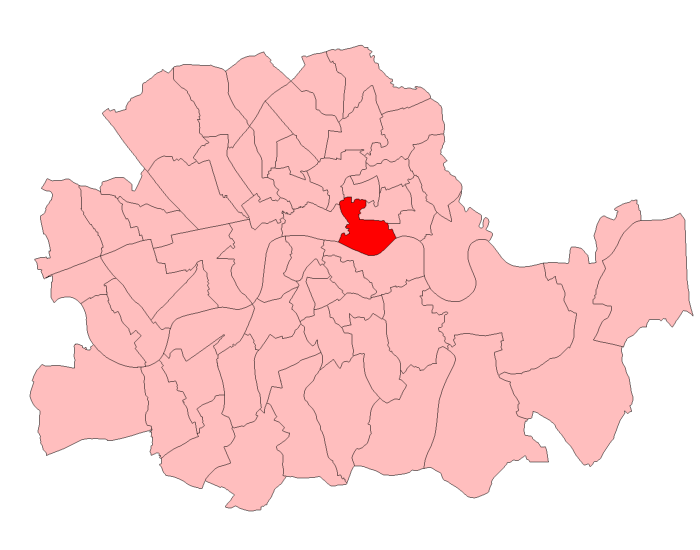
Whitechapel and St George's in the Parliamentary County of London, showing boundaries used from 1918 to 1950.

A map showing the wards of Stepney Metropolitan Borough as they appeared in 1916.

The constituency was a division of the Metropolitan Borough of Stepney in the East End of London. It comprised the local government wards of Mile End New Town, St George-in-the-East North, St George-in-the-East South, Shadwell, Spitalfields East, Spitalfields West, Tower, Whitechapel Middle, and Whitechapel South.

In 1950 the seat was one of three which were combined to form a single Stepney constituency, covering the whole of the Metropolitan Borough.

In 1965 the area became part of the London Borough of Tower Hamlets and Greater London.

== Members of Parliament ==
Election	Member	Party
1918	James Kiley	Liberal
1922	Charles James Mathew	Labour
1923	Harry Gosling	Labour
1930	J. H. Hall	Labour
1931	Barnett Janner	Liberal
1935	J. H. Hall	Labour
1942	Walter Edwards	Labour
1950	constituency abolished	

== Election results ==
=== Elections in the 1940s ===
General election 1945: Stepney, Whitechapel and St. George's
Party	Candidate	Votes	%	±%
Labour	Stoker Edwards	10,460	83.4	+28.7
Conservative	Eustace John B. Nelson	1,113	8.9	New
Liberal	Maximilian Kohn Staub	965	7.7	−37.6
Majority		9,347	74.5	+65.1
Turnout		12,538	66.4	+3.1
Labour hold		Swing		

1942 Whitechapel and St George's by-election
Party	Candidate	Votes	%	±%
Labour	Stoker Edwards	Unopposed	N/A	N/A
Labour hold				

=== Elections in the 1930s ===
General election 1935: Stepney, Whitechapel and St. George's
Party	Candidate	Votes	%	±%
Labour	J. H. Hall	13,374	54.7	+13.1
Liberal	Barnett Janner	11,093	45.3	−1.2
Majority		2,281	9.4	+4.5
Turnout		24,467	63.3	+1.3
Labour gain from Liberal		Swing	+7.2	

General election 1931: Stepney, Whitechapel and St. George's
Party	Candidate	Votes	%	±%
Liberal	Barnett Janner	11,013	46.5	+25.7
Labour	J. H. Hall	9,864	41.6	−21.6
Communist	Harry Pollitt	2,658	11.2	New
New Party	Ted Lewis	154	0.7	New
Majority		1,149	4.9	N/A
Turnout		23,689	62.0	+1.7
Liberal gain from Labour		Swing	+5.0	

1930 Whitechapel and St George's by-election
Party	Candidate	Votes	%	±%
Labour	J. H. Hall	8,544	39.2	−24.0
Liberal	Barnett Janner	7,445	34.1	+13.3
Conservative	Loel Guinness	3,735	17.1	+1.1
Communist	Harry Pollitt	2,106	9.6	New
Majority		1,099	5.1	−37.3
Turnout		21,830	59.0	−1.3
Labour hold		Swing	-18.7	

=== Elections in the 1920s ===
General election 1929: Whitechapel and St. George's
Party	Candidate	Votes	%	±%
Labour	Harry Gosling	13,701	63.2	+4.7
Liberal	Frank H. Sedgwick	4,521	20.8	−20.7
Unionist	Loel Guinness	3,478	16.0	New
Majority		9,180	42.4	+25.4
Turnout		21,700	60.3	−7.7
Labour hold		Swing	+12.7	

General election 1924: Whitechapel and St. George's
Party	Candidate	Votes	%	±%
Labour	Harry Gosling	10,147	58.5	+4.5
Liberal	Harry Nathan	7,193	41.5	−4.5
Majority		2,954	17.0	+9.0
Turnout		17,340	68.0	+9.7
Labour hold		Swing	+4.5	

Gosling

General election 1923: Whitechapel and St. George's
Party	Candidate	Votes	%	±%
Labour	Harry Gosling	7,812	54.0	+13.8
Liberal	James Kiley	6,656	46.0	+8.6
Majority		1,156	8.0	+5.2
Turnout		24,800	58.3	−5.8
Labour hold		Swing	+3.5	

1923 Whitechapel and St George's by-election
Party	Candidate	Votes	%	±%
Labour	Harry Gosling	8,398	57.0	+16.8
Liberal	James Kiley	6,198	42.1	+4.7
National Prohibition Party	S. M. Holden	130	0.9	New
Majority		2,200	14.9	+12.1
Turnout		14,468	60.5	−3.6
Labour hold		Swing	+6.1	

General election 1922: Whitechapel and St. George's
Party	Candidate	Votes	%	±%
Labour	Charles Mathew	6,267	40.2	+11.0
Liberal	James Kiley	5,839	37.4	+2.5
Unionist	Alfred Instone	3,502	22.4	−6.4
Majority		428	2.8	N/A
Turnout		15,608	64.1	+27.1
Labour gain from Liberal		Swing	+4.2	

=== Elections in the 1910s ===
General election 1918: Stepney, Whitechapel and St. George's
Party		Candidate	Votes	%	±%
	Liberal	James Kiley	3,025	34.9	
	Labour	Robert Ambrose	2,522	29.2	
C	Unionist	George Alfred Cohen	2,489	28.8	
	Whitechapel Street-Sellers' and Costers' Union	John Roland Raphael	614	7.1	
Majority			503	5.7	
Turnout			8,650	37.0	
	Liberal win (new seat)				
C indicates candidate endorsed by the coalition government.
