= 1930 Whitechapel and St George's by-election =

UK parliamentary by-election

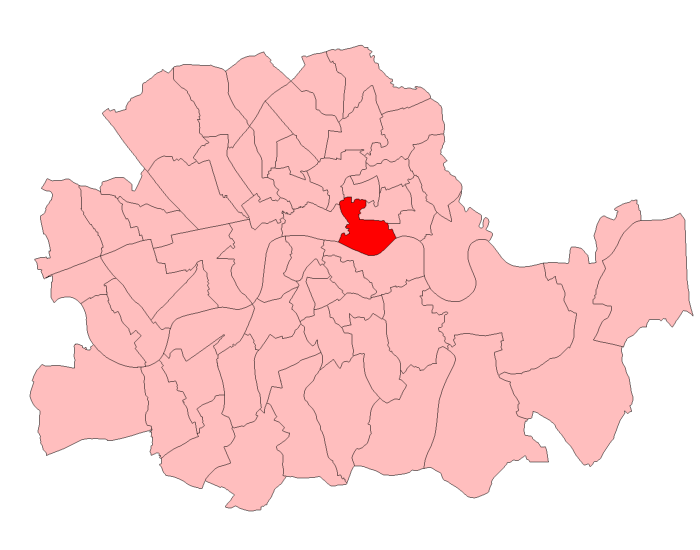
Whitechapel & St George's in 1930

The 1930 Whitechapel and St George's by-election was a parliamentary by-election held on 3 December 1930 for the British House of Commons constituency of Whitechapel and St George's in the Metropolitan Borough of Stepney.

== Vacancy ==
The seat had become vacant when the constituency's Labour Member of Parliament (MP), Harry Gosling, died on 24 October 1930. He had been MP for the seat since a 1923 by-election.

== Electoral history ==
The constituency was a Labour/Liberal marginal that had been won by Labour at every election from 1922 onwards. Usually the Unionists had not fielded a candidate but intervened at the last election, helping to split the anti-Labour vote and give Labour its biggest ever win here;

General election 1929: Stepney, Whitechapel and St. George's Electorate 35,996
Party	Candidate	Votes	%	±%
Labour	Harry Gosling	13,701	63.2	+4.7
Liberal	F.H. Sedgwick	4,521	20.8	−20.7
Unionist	Loel Guinness	3,478	16.0	New
Majority		9,180	42.4	+25.4
Turnout		21,700	60.3	−7.7
Labour hold		Swing	+12.7	

== Candidates ==
The Labour candidate was 53-year-old J. H. Hall. He was contesting his first parliamentary election. He was an Alderman of neighbouring Stepney Borough Council, and was employed as a foreman by the Port of London Authority. He was sponsored by the Transport and General Workers' Union, like his predecessor.

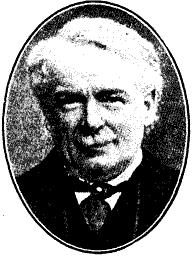
David Lloyd George - head-hunts Liberal candidate

The Liberal candidate selected on 3 November 1930 was 38-year-old Barnett Janner. He had been Liberal candidate for Cardiff Central at the 1929 election, where he had finished third. Later in the year he moved to Hendon, north London, and took up employment as company secretary and solicitor for his father-in-law's business. In 1926 he was elected to the Board of Deputies of British Jews, and subsequently became a member of the executive of the English Zionist Federation. Janner's Jewish background was thought ideal as the Jewish population made up a third of the constituency. In September 1930, before Gosling had died, Liberal leader, David Lloyd George had identified Janner as a suitable candidate. However, there were other Liberals who had been in the running to win the candidate nomination, notably local councillor and social worker, Miss Miriam Moses.

The Conservative Party candidate was 24 years old Loel Guinness. He had contested the seat for the Conservatives in the 1929 general election.

The Communist candidate was 40-year-old Harry Pollitt, the Party's new General Secretary. He had stood against the Prime Minister, Ramsay MacDonald, at Seaham in the 1929 general election.

== Campaign ==
Although the Liberal Party was not expecting to overturn such a large Labour majority, they hoped to do well enough in the by-election to help encourage the party in the rest of the country. Lloyd George ensured that the Liberal's campaign was sufficiently funded through the 'Lloyd George Fund'.

Janner campaigned in opposition to the government's policy on Palestine. On 20 October 1930, the Labour government's Passfield white paper was issued, which proposed the introduction of severe restrictions on Jewish immigration to Palestine. This went down particularly well in the Whitechapel area of the constituency.

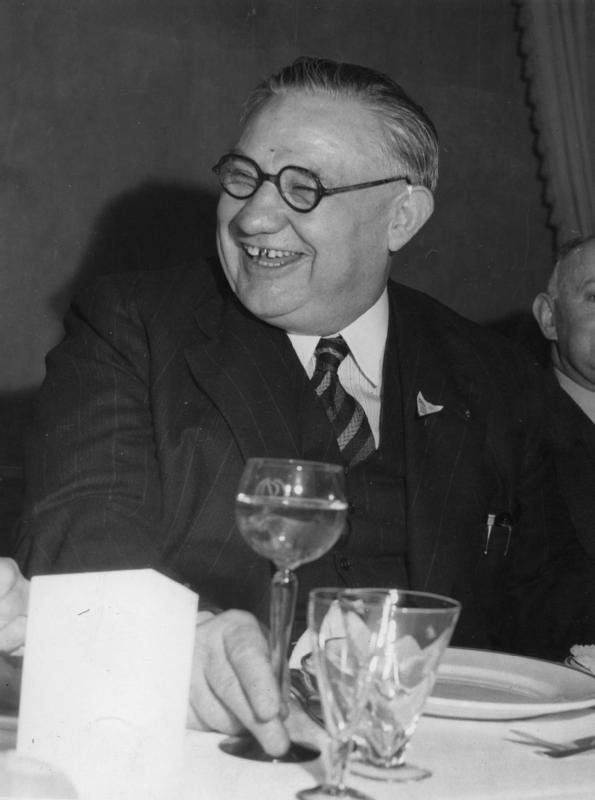
Ernest Bevin - gets support of Palestine Jews

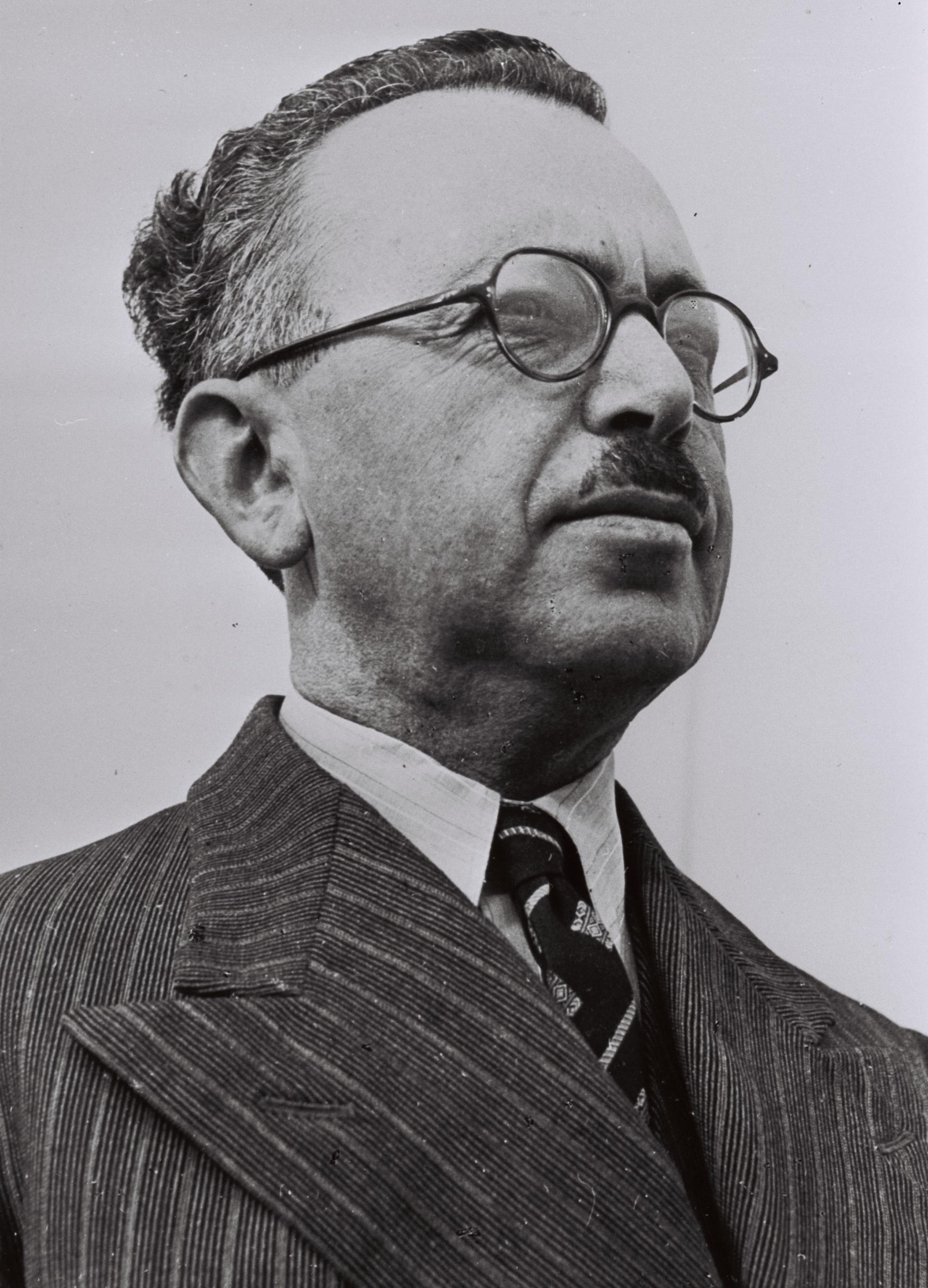
Dov Hoz - Howled down in Whitechapel

The TGWU were worried that the Labour candidate would lose Jewish support and the seat because of the government's white paper. The Union's Secretary, Ernest Bevin met with Dov Hoz and the visiting Jewish Labour movement in Palestine, the Poale Zion, who were unhappy about the government's proposals. He persuaded them to publicly back the Labour candidate, which put them in conflict with many members of the British Poale Zion. Dov Hoz agreed to share a platform with Bevin and Hall at a Labour campaign rally. At the meeting, following the speech from Bevin, Hoz got up to speak and was howled down by the audience. The meeting became so disrupted that the police were called in to restore order. Hoz accused the Liberal candidate Janner, of exploiting the white paper for his own political ends.

== Result ==
Despite a massive swing to the Liberals, Hall held onto the seat on a much reduced majority;

Whitechapel and St. George’s by-election, 1930
Party	Candidate	Votes	%	±%
Labour	J. H. Hall	8,544	39.2	−24.0
Liberal	Barnett Janner	7,445	34.1	+13.3
Conservative	Loel Guinness	3,735	17.1	+1.1
Communist	Harry Pollitt	2,106	9.6	New
Majority		1,099	5.1	−37.3
Turnout		21,830	59.0	−1.3
Labour hold		Swing	-18.7	

Hall blamed the fall in the Labour vote on the economic difficulties faced by the Labour Government, and on a "flood of misrepresentation" from the government's opponents.

== Aftermath ==
Hall held the seat until Janner took it for the Liberals at the 1931 election. Guinness was elected MP for Bath at the same elections;

General election 1931: Stepney, Whitechapel and St. George's
Party	Candidate	Votes	%	±%
Liberal	Barnett Janner	11,013	46.5	+25.7
Labour	J. H. Hall	9,864	41.6	−21.6
Communist	Harry Pollitt	2,658	11.2	N/A
New Party	Ted Lewis	154	0.7	New
Majority		1,149	4.9	N/A
Turnout		23,689	62.0	+1.7
Liberal gain from Labour		Swing	+5.0	

== See also ==
- Whitechapel and St George's constituency
- 1923 Whitechapel and St George's by-election
- 1942 Whitechapel and St George's by-election
- List of United Kingdom by-elections
- United Kingdom by-election records
