= 1916 Whitechapel by-election =

Parliamentary by-election in England

The 1916 Whitechapel by-election was a parliamentary by-election held on 28 December 1916 for the UK House of Commons constituency of Whitechapel, an electoral division of Tower Hamlets in East London.

== Vacancy ==
The by-election was caused by the resignation of the sitting Liberal MP, Sir Stuart Samuel. Samuel had been MP for Whitechapel since 1900 when he took over representation of the seat from his uncle Samuel Montagu. It is not clear why Samuel resigned at this time. He was aged 59 years, but does not seem to have been in ill-health. The resignation took place in the aftermath of change of prime minister on 7 December 1916 when Lloyd George replaced H H Asquith as head of a new wartime coalition. Samuel was the brother of Herbert Samuel who had been a close associate and supporter of Asquith and who had been Home Secretary in Asquith's coalition. Herbert Samuel told Lloyd George that he could not serve in the new government and that he did not like the way it had come about. Herbert Samuel did not resign and sat on the Opposition front bench with Asquith until the end of the War. Against this background it seems possible that Stuart Samuel felt it was time to leave politics particularly as in July 1917 he was elected president of the Board of Deputies of British Jews and may have been aware his name was being considered for this position.

== Candidates ==
=== Liberals ===
The Liberals chose Alderman James Daniel Kiley as their candidate to replace Samuel. Kiley was an East End businessman and local politician who was a former Mayor of Stepney.

=== Conservatives ===
There was a wartime electoral truce in operation and the Conservatives were recent partners in the new Lloyd George/Bonar Law Coalition. Their former candidate, George A Cohen, wrote to The Times to say that while he had been Unionist candidate in Whitechapel for three years and naturally took a keen interest in the welfare of the constituency, he had decided in the present state of the country, to offer no opposition to the official Liberal candidate. He did however object to the possible use by Kiley of the term Coalition candidate, as he (Cohen) had received no approach from the Whitechapel Liberal and Radical Association about the selection of a candidate. As a result, said Cohen, Kiley could not properly call himself a Coalition candidate.

== Process ==
The writ for the by-election was moved in the House of Commons on Friday 22 December. Nomination day was set for 28 December but there were no nominations except for Kiley who was therefore returned unopposed.

== Result ==
Whitechapel by-election, 1916
Party	Candidate	Votes	%	±%
Liberal	James Kiley	Unopposed	N/A	N/A
Liberal hold				

== See also ==
- List of United Kingdom by-elections
- United Kingdom by-election records
- 1913 Whitechapel by-election
