= Lord Janner =

Lord Janner may refer to:

- Barnett Janner, Baron Janner (1892–1982), Liberal and Labour MP
- Greville Janner, Baron Janner of Braunstone (1928–2015), Labour MP and barrister, son of Barnett Janner
