= 1942 Whitechapel and St George's by-election =

UK parliamentary by-election

The 1942 Whitechapel and St. George's by-election was a by-election held on 8 August 1942 for the British House of Commons constituency of Whitechapel and St. George's, which covered Whitechapel, Shadwell, Wapping, and St George in the East in the Metropolitan Borough of Stepney.

The by-election was caused by the death of the constituency's Labour Party Member of Parliament James Henry Hall, who had held the seat since the 1935 general election, having previously been the seat's MP between 1930 and 1931.

In accordance with the war-time electoral pact, neither the Conservative nor the Liberal parties fielded a candidate. Labour's candidate was Stoker Edwards.

There being no other candidates, Edwards was returned unopposed.

== Result ==
Whitechapel and St. George's by-election, 1942
Party	Candidate	Votes	%	±%
Labour	Stoker Edwards	Unopposed	N/A	N/A
Labour hold				

== Previous result ==
General election 14 November 1935: Whitechapel and St. George's
Party	Candidate	Votes	%	±%
Labour	J. H. Hall	13,374	54.7	+13.1
Liberal	Barnett Janner	11,093	45.3	−1.2
Majority		2,281	9.4	N/A
Turnout		24,467	63.3	+1.3
Labour gain from Liberal		Swing	+7.2	

== See also ==
- List of United Kingdom by-elections
- Whitechapel and St. George's constituency
- 1930 Whitechapel and St George's by-election
