= 1923 Whitechapel and St George's by-election =

UK parliamentary by-election

← 1922	8 February 1923	1923 →

Candidate	Gosling	Kiley	Holden
Party	Labour	Liberal	Prohibition
Popular vote	8,398	6,198	130
Percentage	57.0%	42.1%	0.9%
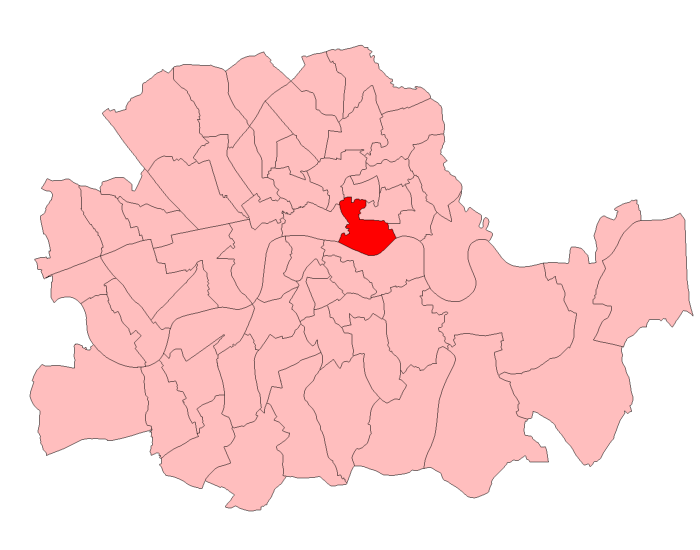
MP before election
Mathew
Labour
Subsequent MP
Gosling
Labour

The 1923 Whitechapel and St George's by-election was a parliamentary by-election for the British House of Commons constituency of Whitechapel and St Georges on 8 February 1923.

== Vacancy ==
The by-election was caused by the death of the sitting Labour MP, Charles James Mathew on 8 January 1923. Mathew died, aged 50, after an operation, seven weeks after his election, becoming one of the shortest-serving MPs in history.

== Election history ==
The constituency was created for the 1918 general election. The area had been a Liberal stronghold and despite the Conservative candidate being endorsed by the Coalition government, the Liberals won a four-cornered contest. At the following general election, Labour narrowly gained the seat. The result was;

1922 general election: Whitechapel and St George's
Party	Candidate	Votes	%	±%
Labour	Charles James Mathew	6,267	40.2	+11.0
Liberal	James Kiley	5,839	37.4	+2.5
Conservative	A. Instone	3,502	22.4	−6.4
Majority		428	2.8	N/A
Turnout		15,608	64.1	+27.1
Labour gain from Liberal		Swing	+4.3	

== Candidates ==
- The local Labour Party selected 61-year-old Harry Gosling to defend the seat. Gosling first stood for election to Parliament as a Liberal Party candidate at the December 1910 general election but failed to win a seat at Lambeth North. He stood as a Labour Party candidate in Uxbridge at the next general election in 1918, but was again defeated. At the following general election in 1922, he was again defeated as a Labour candidate at Kennington. He was also a member of the London County Council since 1898, representing St George's-in-the-East until 1919 and Kennington thereafter. In 1920 Labour formally became a separate party within the council, and Gosling became the first leader of the Labour group.
- The local Liberal Party re-selected 57-year-old James Kiley to regain the seat. Kiley had sat as Liberal MP for Whitechapel from 1916 to 1918 and then for Whitechapel and St Georges from 1918 until his defeat in 1922. In 1910, he was elected to Stepney Borough Council, becoming an alderman in 1913 and serving as the borough's mayor in 1915. He was also a member of the Metropolitan Water Board from 1914 to 1922.
- At a meeting of the National Prohibition Party in London on 15 January 1923, attendees decided to intervene in the by-election, fielding S. M. Holden, of Huncoat, Lancashire. The party platform centred on the support for the banning of alcohol. Holden had contested Accrington at the 1906 general election, coming third.
- On 22 January, the local Conservative Association met and decided not to contest the by-election.

== Campaign ==
Polling day was set for 8 February 1923, exactly one month after the death of Mathew. Nominations closed on 31 January 1923; it transpired that there would be a three-cornered contest between Labour's Gosling, the Liberal Kiley and the Prohibitionist Holden.

Leading Liberal Sir John Simon, who had gained a seat from Labour at the 1922 general election, came to speak in support of Kiley.

Holden's campaign received the active support of Edwin Scrymgeour, who had been elected to parliament for Dundee at the 1922 general election on behalf of the Scottish Prohibition Party.

- British Pathe film of Holden opening his campaign;

http://www.britishpathe.com/video/englands-first-prohibitionist-m-p/query/CAMPAIGNING+BY

== Result ==
The Labour Party held the seat.

Harry Gosling

Whitechapel and St George's by-election, 1923
Party	Candidate	Votes	%	±%
Labour	Harry Gosling	8,398	57.0	+16.8
Liberal	James Kiley	6,198	42.1	+4.7
National Prohibition Party	S. M. Holden	130	0.9	New
Majority		2,200	14.9	+12.1
Turnout		14,726	60.5	−3.6
Labour hold		Swing	+6.1	

== Aftermath ==
Gosling and Kiley went head-to-head again at the General election later in the year with the same outcome;

1923 general election: Whitechapel and St George's
Party	Candidate	Votes	%	±%
Labour	Harry Gosling	7,812	54.0	−3.0
Liberal	James Kiley	6,656	46.0	+3.9
Majority		1,156	8.0	−6.9
Turnout		14,468	58.3	−2.2
Labour hold		Swing	-3.5	

The National Prohibition Party did not contest another parliamentary seat. Holden did not stand for parliament again until 1929 when he contested Preston as an Independent candidate.

== See also ==
- List of United Kingdom by-elections
- United Kingdom by-election records
