= James Kiley =

British businessman and Liberal Party politician

James Daniel Kiley (1865 – 12 September 1953) was a British businessman and Liberal Party politician who served in the House of Commons from 1916 to 1922 as a Member of Parliament (MP) for constituencies in the Whitechapel area of the East End of London.

A director of a warehouse company in Houndsditch, he entered politics in 1910, when he was elected to Stepney Borough Council, becoming an alderman in 1913 and serving as the borough's mayor in 1915. He was also a member of the Metropolitan Water Board from 1914 to 1922, and a justice of the peace from 1913.

During the First World War there was a political truce between the parties, who agreed not to contest any by-elections caused by death or resignations of sitting members of parliament. When a vacancy occurred with the resignation of the Liberal MP Sir Stuart Samuel, Bt in December 1916, Kiley was elected unopposed as the MP for the Whitechapel division of Stepney. The Whitechapel constituency was abolished in boundary changes for the 1918 general election, and Kiley was elected for the new Whitechapel and St Georges division of Stepney. He held the seat despite his Conservative Party opponent having received the coalition coupon, but with both Labour and Conservative candidates winning over 28% of the votes, Kiley's victory was obtained with only 35% of the votes. (The fourth candidate, an independent won 7%).

However, at the 1922 general election, when he faced only Labour and Conservative opponents, Kiley lost the seat to the Labour Party candidate Charles Mathew by a majority of 2.8%. He stood again at the by-election in February 1923 after Mathew's death, but lost by a wider margin, and was unsuccessful again at the general election in December 1923. He did not stand for Parliament again.

He continued in business, eventually becoming chairman of Whyte Ridsdale and Company Limited, a leading firm of fancy goods and toy merchants. He was a forceful proponent of free trade both in politics and business, opposing tariffs or other restrictions.

Parliament of the United Kingdom
Preceded by Sir Stuart Samuel, Bt	Member of Parliament for Whitechapel; 1916 – 1918	Constituency abolished
New constituency	Member of Parliament for Whitechapel and St Georges; 1918 – 1922	Succeeded by Charles Mathew
