= Axel Carl Johan Gustafson =

Swedish-American author

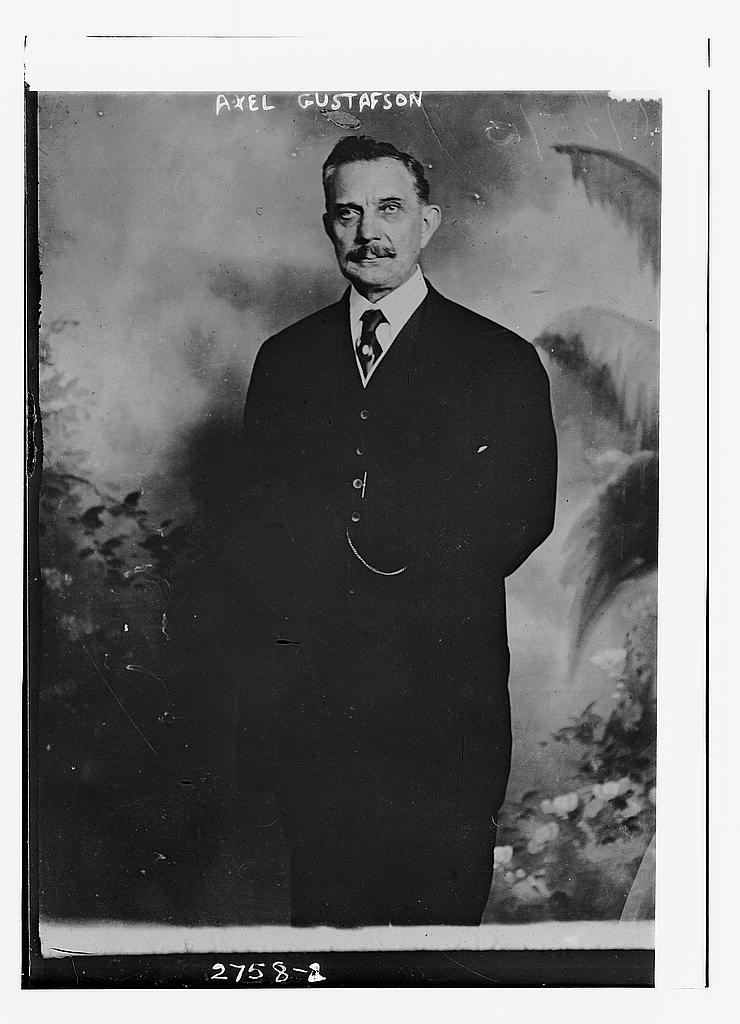
Axel Carl Johan Gustafson c. 1913

Axel Carl Johan Gustafson (c. 1847 – ?) was a Swedish-American author.

== Biography ==
He was born in Lund, Sweden, about 1847. His father was a clergyman, and Axel was educated in his native town. At the age of twenty-one he came to the United States, was naturalized, and began to write for the press. Becoming interested in the temperance movement, he contributed to a Boston journal an article on the Gottenburg system of granting licenses, which led to an investigation of the different licensing systems of the world. He also became a contributor to several of the leading periodicals.

== Career ==
Soon after coming to the United States, Gustafson married Zadel Barnes Buddington, who greatly assisted him in his literary work. Going to England, Mr. and Mrs. Gustafson met Samuel Morley, the philanthropist, who induced the former to change his intention of writing a work on the abuse of tobacco, and discuss the liquor question instead. The Foundation of Death (London, 1884) was the outcome of this change of plan. This work discusses the use of liquor among the ancients, the history of the discovery of distillation, liquor adulterations, the effects of alcohol on the physical organs and functions, the social and moral results arising from the drinking habit, heredity, the use of alcohol as a medicine, and includes an inquiry into the methods of reformation. It passed through three editions, and has been translated into Swedish, German, French, Spanish, Malagasy, Burmese, and Mahratta.

In 1887, Gustafson founded the National Prohibition Party to further his views.

== Selected works ==
- The United States and the Panama Canal (1882)
- The Foundation of Death. A study of the drink-question (London, 1884)
- The Medicine Stamp Tax; an oppressive burden on the sick, an encouragement to quackery, etc(1884)
- Some thoughts on moderation in the use of alcohol (1885)
