= Zadel Barnes Gustafson =

American author, poet and journalist

Zadel Barnes Budington Gustafson
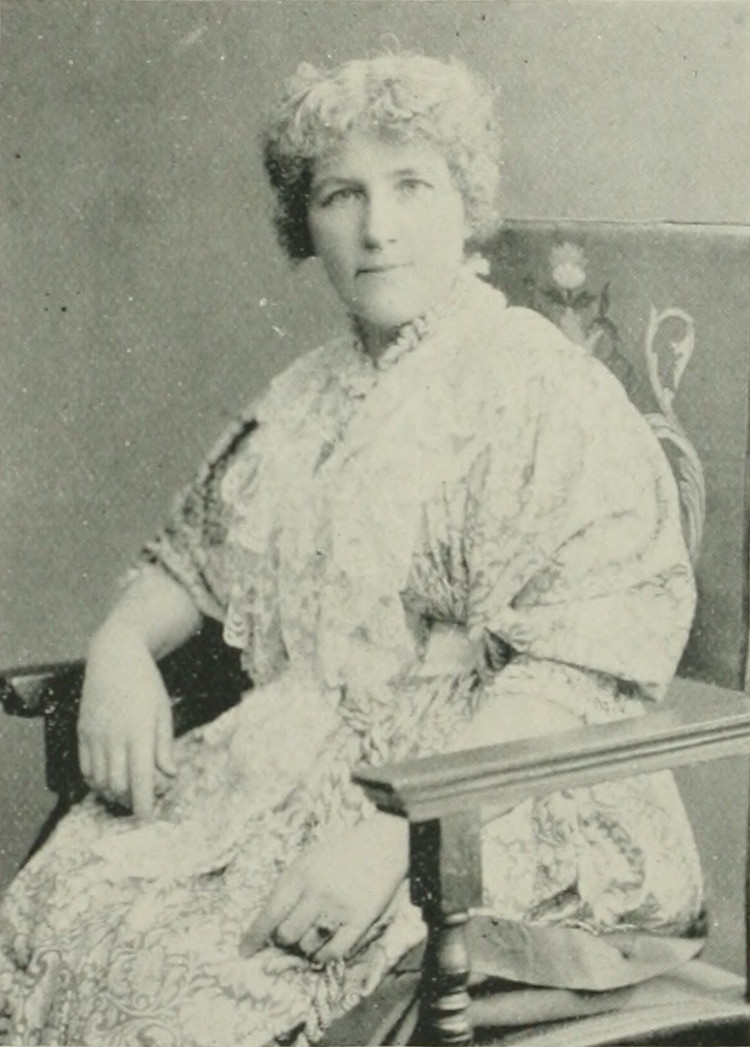
- Zadel Barnes Gustafson, c. 1891
- Born: Zadel Barnes; 1841; Middletown, Connecticut, United States
- Died: 1917 (aged 75–76)
- Known for: Poetry, Journalism

Zadel Barnes Budington Gustafson (1841–1917) was an American author, poet and journalist.

== Biography ==
Zadel Barnes was born in Middletown, Connecticut. She was the daughter of Duane Barnes and Cynthia Turner. Early in her life, she began writing verses, stories and sketches. A paper by her in favor of the abolition of capital punishment attracted general attention.

She contributed articles and fictional pieces to leading publications including the Pall Mall Gazette, Leslie's Weekly, and Harper's Monthly Magazine. For two years, she was political editor of the Springfield Republican in Springfield, Massachusetts. She wrote a tribute to the poet William Cullen Bryant of which John Greenleaf Whittier wrote: I can only compare it with Milton's Lycidas; it is worthy of any living poet at least. Her poem Little Martin Craghan, based on the true story of a twelve-year-old boy whose heroism cost him his life in the mines of Pittston, Pennsylvania, became very popular.

She married Henry Aaron Budington (1831-1920) when she was 16 in 1857. They had two sons, Justin Llewellyn Budington (born 1859) and Henry Aaron Budington (later Wald Barnes) (born 1865). They were divorced around 1879. She later married Axel Carl Johan Gustafson. They had one son, Emmanuel Gustafson. Her published works appeared under the name Zadel Turner Barnes as well as Z. B. Budington and Z. B. Gustafson. She was the grandmother of Djuna Barnes through her son Wald.

== Publications ==
- Can the Old Love? (Boston, 1871)
- Meg, A Pastoral, and other Poems (Boston, 1879)
- Genevieve Ward; a Biographic Sketch (Boston, 1882)

She edited:

- Zophiel by Maria Gowen Brooks, with a sketch of the author (Boston, 1879)
