= Stoker Edwards =

British politician (1900–1964)

Member of Parliament
- In office 8 August 1942 – 15 October 1964
- Preceded by: J. H. Hall
- Succeeded by: Peter Shore
- Constituency: Whitechapel and St Georges (1942–1950); Stepney (1950–1964)

Civil Lord of the Admiralty
- In office 1945–1951
- Prime Minister: Clement Attlee
- Succeeded by: Simon Wingfield Digby

Personal details
- Born: Walter James Edwards; 1900 Whitechapel, London, England
- Died: 15 October 1964
- Party: Labour

Military service
- Branch/service: Royal Navy
- Rank: Leading stoker
- Battles/wars: Second World War

Walter James Edwards (1900 – 15 October 1964), known as Stoker Edwards or Wally Edwards, was a British Labour Party politician.

Edwards was born in Whitechapel, in the East End of London. He briefly worked as a carman from 1917 and in 1918 enlisted in the Royal Navy as a stoker and served until 1923. He then became a docker. He joined the Labour Party and the Transport and General Workers' Union and in 1937 was appointed a full-time officer with the union's Docks Group. From 1935 to 1939 he was chairman of the Whitechapel Labour Party.

In the Second World War he was recalled as a Naval reservist and rose to the rate of Leading Stoker. In 1942 he was elected as Member of Parliament (MP) for Whitechapel and St Georges, the first serving Royal Navy rating to be elected to Parliament. Following boundary changes in 1950, he was elected for the new Stepney constituency and served until his retirement in 1964. He served as Civil Lord of the Admiralty from 1945 to 1951. A devout Roman Catholic, he was known as a campaigner against prostitution, which was a big problem in his constituency. He died on the day of the 1964 general election.

Edwards was elected to Stepney Borough Council in 1934 and served on it until 1959. In 1944–1945, when he was already an MP, he served as mayor. Edwards' only son, Teddy, was killed on active service in 1944. He also had a daughter, Catherine.

Parliament of the United Kingdom
Preceded by James Henry Hall	Member of Parliament for Whitechapel and St Georges; 1942–1950	Constituency abolished
New constituency	Member of Parliament for Stepney; 1950–1964	Succeeded by Peter Shore
