= Leicester North West =

Parliamentary constituency in the United Kingdom, 1950–1974

- Former borough constituency for the House of Commons

1950–February 1974
- Seats: one
- Created from: Leicester West
- Replaced by: Leicester West

Leicester North West was a borough constituency in the city of Leicester. It returned one Member of Parliament (MP) to the House of Commons of the Parliament of the United Kingdom.

The constituency was created for the 1950 general election, and abolished for the February 1974 general election.

== Boundaries ==
The County Borough of Leicester wards of Abbey, Newton, St Margaret's, and Westcotes.

== Members of Parliament ==
Election	Member	Party
1950	Barnett Janner	Labour
1970	Greville Janner	Labour
Feb 1974	constituency abolished	

== Election results ==
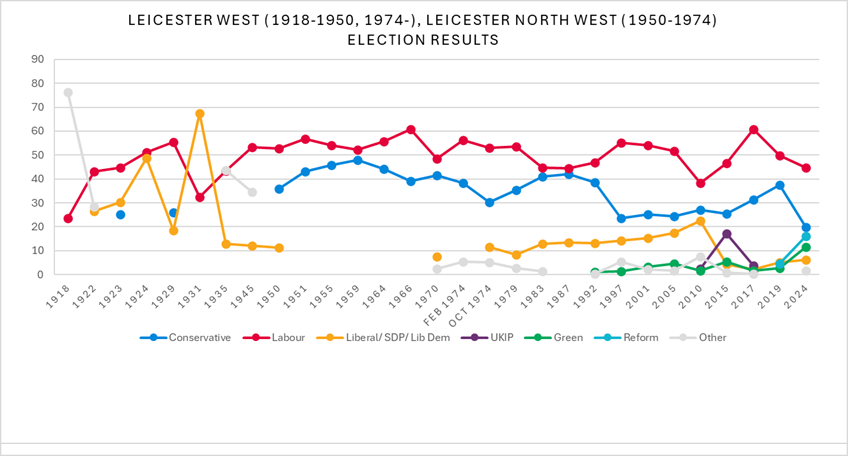
Leicester west and Leicester north west election results 1918–2024

=== Elections in the 1950s ===
General election 1950: Leicester North West
Party	Candidate	Votes	%	±%
Labour	Barnett Janner	23,505	52.88	
Conservative	Nigel Nicolson	15,912	35.80	
Liberal	Robert Archibald Burrows	5,036	11.33	
Majority		7,593	17.08	
Turnout		44,453	85.92	
Labour win (new seat)				

General election 1951: Leicester North West
Party	Candidate	Votes	%	±%
Labour	Barnett Janner	25,184	56.84	
Conservative	William John Cornelis Heyting	19,125	43.16	
Majority		6,059	13.68	
Turnout		44,309	84.35	
Labour hold		Swing		

General election 1955: Leicester North West
Party	Candidate	Votes	%	±%
Labour	Barnett Janner	22,807	54.17	
Conservative	Frederick Arthur Tomlinson	19,297	45.83	
Majority		3,510	8.34	
Turnout		42,104	78.74	
Labour hold		Swing		

General election 1959: Leicester North West
Party	Candidate	Votes	%	±%
Labour	Barnett Janner	21,515	52.15	
Conservative	Frederick Arthur Tomlinson	19,742	47.85	
Majority		1,733	4.30	
Turnout		41,257	79.46	
Labour hold		Swing		

=== Elections in the 1960s ===
General election 1964: Leicester North West
Party	Candidate	Votes	%	±%
Labour	Barnett Janner	21,134	55.80	
Conservative	E George A Farnham	16,740	44.20	
Majority		4,394	11.60	
Turnout		37,874	76.19	
Labour hold		Swing		

General election 1966: Leicester North West
Party	Candidate	Votes	%	±%
Labour	Barnett Janner	21,822	60.89	
Conservative	Carol Mather	14,015	39.11	
Majority		7,807	21.78	
Turnout		35,837	73.73	
Labour hold		Swing		

=== Elections in the 1970s ===
General election 1970: Leicester North West
Party	Candidate	Votes	%	±%
Labour	Greville Janner	18,226	48.46	
Conservative	Stuart J Symington	15,584	41.44	
Liberal	Richard J Rogers	2,862	7.61	New
National Democratic	Robert E Welford	935	2.49	New
Majority		2,642	7.02	
Turnout		37,607	70.85	
Labour hold		Swing		
