= J. H. Hall =

British trade unionist and politician (1877–1942)

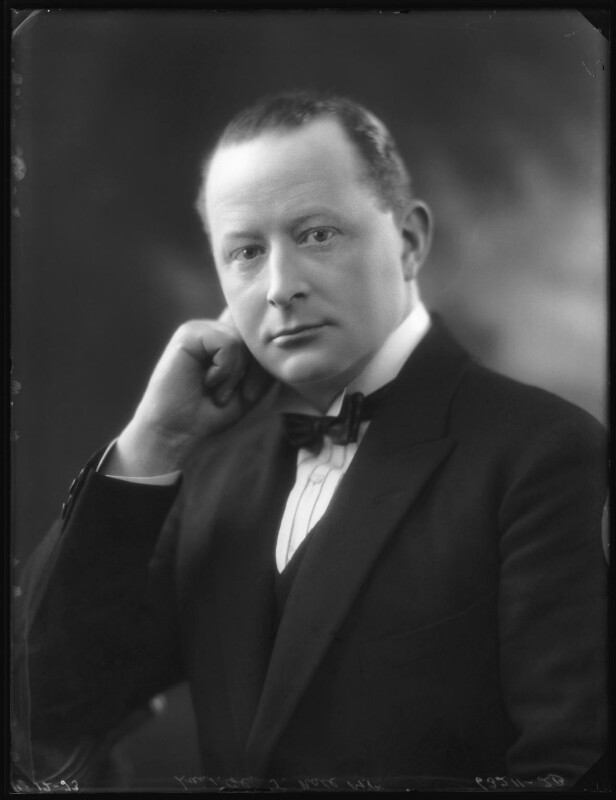
Hall in 1923

James Henry Hall (24 March 1877 – 6 June 1942), known as J. H. Hall, was an English trade unionist and Labour Party politician who served as the Member of Parliament (MP) for the Whitechapel and St Georges division of Stepney from 1930 to 1931, and again from 1935 to 1942.

== Career ==
Hall became interested in trade unionism in his youth, and rose to become a member of the executive committee of the Transport and General Workers Union. He became an alderman of Stepney Borough Council, and before his election to Parliament was employed as a foreman by the Port of London Authority.

He was first elected to the House of Commons a by-election in December 1930, following the death of the Labour MP Harry Gosling.

His 39% share of the vote was well below the 63% achieved by Gosling at the 1929 general election, the Liberal vote having increased significantly while the Communist Party contested the seat for the first time; their candidate was the party's General Secretary Harry Pollitt, who won nearly 10% of the votes. Hall blamed the fall in the Labour vote on the economic difficulties faced by the Labour Government, and on a "flood of misrepresentation" from the government's opponents.

At the general election in October 1931, the left-wing vote was again split. Pollitt polled over 10% of the votes and Hall lost the seat to Barnett Janner, the Liberal who had been runner-up at the by-election. However, at the 1935 general election Hall re-took the seat in a straight fight with Janner. In reporting his victory, The Times noted that he had "worked in the trade union movement for over 40 years".

Hall died in office in June 1942, aged 65, having been too ill to attend the House of Commons for the previous eight months. At the resulting by-election for his parliamentary seat, the Labour candidate Walter "Stoker" Edwards was returned unopposed.

== Family ==
Hall married Theresa Ellen Coleman from Leyton. They had a son and three daughters.

Parliament of the United Kingdom
Preceded by Harry Gosling	Member of Parliament for Whitechapel & St Georges; 1930 – 1931	Succeeded by Barnett Janner
Preceded by Barnett Janner	Member of Parliament for Whitechapel & St Georges; 1935 – 1942	Succeeded by Stoker Edwards
