= Charles Mathew (Labour politician) =

British barrister and Labour politician

Charles James Mathew, CBE, KC (24 October 1872 – 8 January 1923) was a British barrister and Labour politician. He was elected as the Member of Parliament (MP) for Whitechapel and St Georges in the 1922 general election, but died seven weeks later.

The second son of Sir James Charles Mathew, a Lord Justice of Appeal, Charles James Mathew was educated at The Oratory School, Edgbaston, Birmingham and Trinity Hall, Cambridge. He was called to the bar at Lincoln's Inn in 1897 and took silk in 1913, specialising in Chancery cases. He was also an expert in trade union law.

A member of the London County Council since 1910, Mathew was also a member of the Statutory Committee on War Pensions and Chairman of the Special Grants Committee. He was made a Commander of the Order of the British Empire (CBE) in 1917.

Mathew's political views had moved steadily closer to the Labour Party, and he was selected by the party to fight the Whitechapel and St. George's constituency at the 1922 General Election. At the poll, he defeated the incumbent Liberal MP, James Kiley by just 428 votes.

Mathew died, aged 50, after an operation, less than two months after his election, becoming one of the shortest-serving MPs in history. At the subsequent by-election Harry Gosling held the seat for Labour.

A Roman Catholic, he married in 1896, Anna, daughter of James Cassidy, of Monasterevin, County Kildare. There were two sons and a daughter. His elder son, Sir Theobald Mathew, later became the Director of Public Prosecutions.

== See also ==
- List of United Kingdom MPs with the shortest service

Parliament of the United Kingdom
Preceded by James Daniel Kiley	Member of Parliament for Whitechapel and St. George's; 1922 – 1923	Succeeded by Harry Gosling
