= 1913 Whitechapel by-election =

UK parliamentary by-election

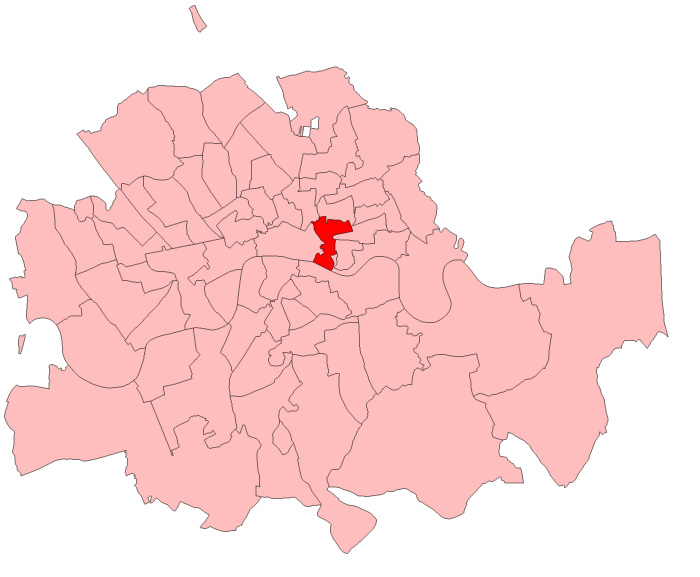
Whitechapel in London 1913

The 1913 Whitechapel by-election was a Parliamentary by-election held on 30 April 1913. The constituency returned one Member of Parliament (MP) to the House of Commons of the United Kingdom, elected by the first past the post voting system.

== Vacancy ==
Sir Stuart Samuel the Liberal MP for Whitechapel undertook a contract for the Public Service, which required him to resign his seat and face re-election.

== Electoral history ==
General election December 1910: Whitechapel
Party	Candidate	Votes	%	±%
Liberal	Stuart Samuel	1,731	59.2	+0.9
Conservative	Edgar Monteagle Browne	1,191	40.8	−0.9
Majority		540	18.4	+1.8
Turnout		2,922		
Liberal hold		Swing	+0.9	

== Candidates ==
Sir Stuart Samuel had been Liberal MP for the seat since 1900 and the seat had been Liberal since it was created in 1885. He was opposed by Edgar Browne, who had been his Unionist opponent in December 1910.

== Campaign ==
=== Votes for women ===
The National Union of Women's Suffrage Societies, following the adoption of their new policy to not support Liberal candidates, chose not to support either candidate and instead opened a local office from which to carry out propaganda work. The smaller Women's Freedom League, a breakaway group from the Women's Social and Political Union who favoured direct action but opposed violence, also set up a local campaign office. However, the WFL's position on by-elections was specifically anti-government, so they campaigned against the return of the Liberal candidate Samuel and thus by definition in support of his Unionist opponent, Browne.

== Result ==
Stuart Samuel retained the seat for the Liberal Party.

Stuart Samuel

Whitechapel by-election, 1913
Party	Candidate	Votes	%	±%
Liberal	Stuart Samuel	1,722	52.5	−6.7
Unionist	Edgar Monteagle Browne	1,556	47.5	+6.7
Majority		166	5.0	−13.4
Turnout		3,278		
Liberal hold		Swing	-6.7	

== Aftermath ==
Samuel retired from politics in 1916 and the Liberals held the resulting by-election unopposed.

== See also ==
- List of United Kingdom by-elections
- United Kingdom by-election records
- 1916 Whitechapel by-election
