= Weir Greenlees =

English cricketer and clergyman

Personal information
- Full name: Weir Loudon Greenlees Greenlees
- Born: 26 December 1882; Islington, Middlesex, England
- Died: 10 January 1975 (aged 92); Marylebone, London, England
- Batting: Unknown
- Role: Wicket-keeper

Domestic team information
- Years: Team
- 1904: London County
- 1904: Oxford University

Career statistics
Competition	First-class
Matches	2
Runs scored	68
Batting average	22.66
100s/50s	–/–
Top score	39*
Catches/stumpings	1/–
- Source: Cricinfo, 12 May 2020

Weir Loudon Greenlees Greenlees (26 December 1882 – 10 January 1975) was an English first-class cricketer, distiller and soldier.

The son of Samuel Greenlees, he was born in December 1882 at Islington. He was educated at Harrow School, before going up to Magdalen College, Oxford. While studying at Oxford in 1904, Greenlees made two appearances in first-class cricket. The first came for London County against Leicestershire at Leicester, with his second appearance coming for Oxford University in a trial match against the Marylebone Cricket Club at Lord's.

After graduating from Oxford, he entered into the family Scotch whiskey distilling business. Greenlees was the Conservative candidate for Whitechapel in the January 1910 general election, finishing second to the Liberal Party candidate Stuart Samuel. Owing to his Scottish parentage, he enlisted as a second lieutenant in the Scottish Horse Yeomanary in November 1911. Weeks prior to the start of the First World War in July 1914, Greenlees was promoted to lieutenant and served in the conflict. He was made a temporary captain in October 1915, with him transferring to the Scots Guards in October 1916. Following the war, he was appointed a court-martial officer in December 1918. In the same month he was made a temporary major, which he relinquished in April 1920 and returned to the rank of lieutenant. In the same month he resigned his commission, upon which he was granted the rank of major. Greenlees died at Marylebone in January 1975.
