= Harry Gosling =

British Labour Party politician and trade union leader

Harry Gosling CH MP
- Portrait by Walter Stoneman, 1924

Paymaster General
- In office 6 May 1924 – 3 November 1924
- Monarch: George V
- Prime Minister: Ramsay MacDonald
- Preceded by: Archibald Boyd-Carpenter
- Succeeded by: The Duke of Sutherland; From 28 January 1925

Minister for Transport
- In office 24 January 1924 – 3 November 1924
- Preceded by: Sir John Baird
- Succeeded by: Wilfrid Ashley

Member of Parliament for Whitechapel and St Georges
- In office 8 February 1923 – 24 October 1930
- Preceded by: Charles James Mathew
- Succeeded by: James Henry Hall

Personal details
- Born: 9 June 1861 Lambeth, London, England
- Died: 24 October 1930 (aged 69) Twickenham, London, England
- Party: Labour

Harry Gosling CH (9 June 1861 – 24 October 1930) was a British Labour Party politician and trade union leader.

== Early life ==
Gosling was born in 1861 at 57 York Street, Lambeth, London, on the southern bank of the River Thames. He was the second son of William Gosling, master lighterman, and his wife Sarah Louisa née Rowe, a schoolteacher. His family were watermen, working on the river for several generations. Following an education at Blackfriars Elementary School, he entered employment as an office boy, aged 13. A year later he reached sufficient age to begin a seven-year apprenticeship to the Watermen's Company, working with his father on the wharves that would later become the site of the County Hall.

== Trade unionism ==
The success of the 1889 London Dock Strike encouraged the river workers to form a union, the Amalgamated Society of Watermen, Lightermen and Bargemen. Gosling was one of its first members, and was appointed general secretary in 1892, aged 32. In 1908 he was appointed as the workers' representative on the newly formed Port of London Authority, and to the Parliamentary Committee of the Trades Union Congress. When the Watermen's Society was merged into the Transport and General Workers' Union in 1922, Gosling became the TGWU's first and only president, holding office until his death.

== London County Council ==
He was also a member of London County Council from 1898 to 1925, representing St George's-in-the-East until 1919 and Kennington thereafter. Initially he was a member of the Progressive Party on the council, forming a left wing group of "Labour Progressives" with John Burns, Ben Cooper and Will Crooks. In 1920 Labour formally became a separate party within the council, and Gosling became the first leader of the Labour group.

During the First World War Gosling was a member of the Port and Transit Executive, the body charged with organising imports and exports by sea. At the end of hostilities he was appointed to the Imperial War Graves Commission.

== Parliament ==
Gosling first stood for election to parliament as a Liberal Party candidate at the December 1910 general election but failed to win a seat at Lambeth North. At the next General Election in 1918 he stood as a Labour Party candidate at Uxbridge but was again defeated. The following General Election in 1922 he was again defeated as a Labour candidate at Kennington. In the following year C. J. Matthew, the sitting Labour MP for Whitechapel and St Georges died, and Gosling held the seat for the party at the ensuing by-election, retaining it until his death. For a short period in 1924 he was Minister of Transport and Paymaster General in the First Labour Government.

For the last six years of his life Gosling was in poor health. In 1927 he wrote a book of reminiscences Up and Down Stream. He was the third person to be appointed to the Order of the Companions of Honour. Harry Gosling died at his home in Twickenham in October 1930, aged 69. His body was laid in state at Transport House, headquarters of the TGWU, before its cremation at Golders Green.

Parliament of the United Kingdom
Preceded by Charles James Mathew	Member of Parliament for Whitechapel and St Georges; 1923–1930	Succeeded by James Henry Hall
Party political offices
Preceded by New position	Leader of the Labour Party on London County Council; 1919–1924	Succeeded by Emil Davies
Trade union offices
Preceded by Harry Quelch	Chairman of the London Trades Council; 1906–1910	Succeeded by Harry Quelch
Preceded by Charles Ammon and Ernest Bevin	Trades Union Congress representative to the American Federation of Labour; 1916; With: William Whitefield	Succeeded by Arthur Hayday and John Hill
Preceded by James Seddon	President of the Trades Union Congress; 1916	Succeeded by John Hill
Preceded by New position	National Secretary (Waterways Group) of the Transport and General Workers' Union; 1922–1930	Succeeded by Dan W. Milford
Preceded by New position	President of the Transport and General Workers' Union; 1922–1930	Succeeded by Herbert Kershaw as chairman
Political offices
Preceded by Sir John Baird	Minister of Transport; 1924	Succeeded by Wilfrid Ashley
Preceded by Archibald Boyd-Carpenter	Paymaster General; 1924	Vacant Title next held by The Duke of Sutherland
