= Whitechapel (UK Parliament constituency) =

Parliamentary constituency in the United Kingdom, 1885–1918

- Former borough constituency for the House of Commons
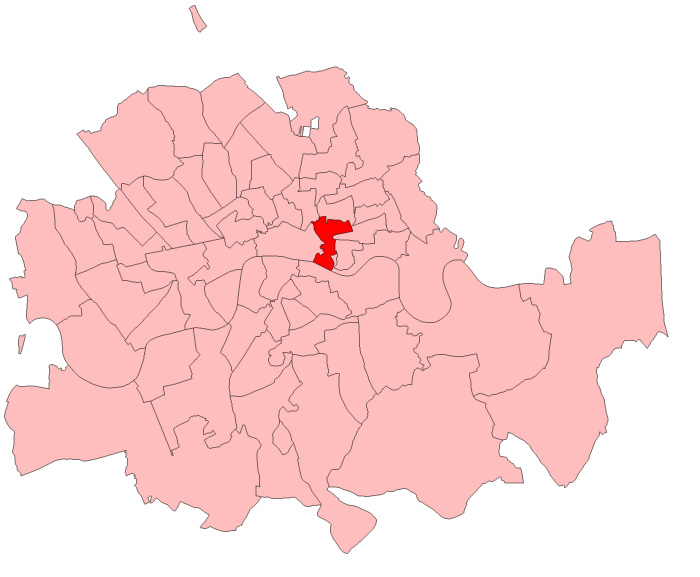
- Whitechapel in London

1885–1918
- Seats: one
- Created from: Tower Hamlets
- Replaced by: Whitechapel St George's

Whitechapel was a parliamentary constituency in the Whitechapel district of East London. In 1885 the seat was established as a division of the parliamentary borough of Tower Hamlets. It returned one Member of Parliament (MP) to the House of Commons of the Parliament of the United Kingdom.

== History and Boundaries ==
The constituency was created by the Redistribution of Seats Act 1885 for the 1885 general election, and abolished for the 1918 general election.

Whitechapel is part of the historic county of Middlesex, in the far east of the county. The constituency was on the north bank of the River Thames. It was bordered by the constituencies of: City of London to the west; Hoxton & Bethnal Green South West to the north; and Stepney & St George's in the East to the east.

From 1889 the district was included in the administrative County of London. In 1900 the constituency became part of the Metropolitan Borough of Stepney.

In the redistribution of 1918 Whitechapel was incorporated in a new Whitechapel and St George's constituency.

== Members of Parliament ==
Election	Member	Party
1885	Sir Samuel Montagu, Bt	Liberal
1900	Sir Stuart Samuel, Bt	Liberal
1916 by-election	James Kiley	Liberal
1918	constituency abolished: see Whitechapel and St George's	

== Elections ==
Decades:	1880s; 1890s; 1900s; 1910s

=== Elections in the 1880s ===
Montagu

General election 1885: Whitechapel
Party	Candidate	Votes	%	±%
Liberal	Samuel Montagu	2,353	54.4	
Conservative	Phineas Cowan	1,972	45.6	
Majority		381	8.8	
Turnout		4,325	70.4	
Registered electors		6,140		
Liberal win (new seat)				

General election 1886: Whitechapel
Party	Candidate	Votes	%	±%
Liberal	Samuel Montagu	2,179	57.8	+3.4
Conservative	William Le Poer Trench	1,592	42.2	−3.4
Majority		587	15.6	+6.8
Turnout		3,771	61.4	−9.0
Registered electors		6,140		
Liberal hold		Swing	+3.4	

=== Elections in the 1890s ===
General election 1892: Whitechapel
Party	Candidate	Votes	%	±%
Liberal	Samuel Montagu	2,327	56.4	−1.4
Conservative	William Le Poer Trench	1,800	43.6	+1.4
Majority		527	12.8	−2.8
Turnout		4,127	71.0	+9.6
Registered electors		5,813		
Liberal hold		Swing	-1.4	

General election 1895: Whitechapel
Party	Candidate	Votes	%	±%
Liberal	Samuel Montagu	2,009	50.4	−6.0
Conservative	Sir William Henry Porter, 2nd Baronet	1,977	49.6	+6.0
Majority		32	0.8	−12.0
Turnout		3,986	68.0	−3.0
Registered electors		5,864		
Liberal hold		Swing	-6.0	

=== Elections in the 1900s ===
Samuel

General election 1900: Whitechapel
Party	Candidate	Votes	%	±%
Liberal	Stuart Samuel	1,679	51.1	+0.7
Conservative	David Hope Kyd	1,608	48.9	−0.7
Majority		71	2.2	+1.4
Turnout		3,287	65.7	−2.3
Registered electors		5,004		
Liberal hold		Swing	+0.7	

General election 1906: Whitechapel
Party	Candidate	Votes	%	±%
Liberal	Stuart Samuel	1,925	55.1	+4.0
Conservative	David Hope Kyd	1,569	44.9	−4.0
Majority		356	10.2	+8.0
Turnout		3,494	81.7	+16.0
Registered electors		4,279		
Liberal hold		Swing	+4.0	

=== Elections in the 1910s ===
General election January 1910: Whitechapel
Party	Candidate	Votes	%	±%
Liberal	Stuart Samuel	1,963	58.3	+3.2
Conservative	Weir Greenlees	1,402	41.7	−3.2
Majority		561	16.6	+6.4
Turnout		3,365		
Liberal hold		Swing	+3.2	

General election December 1910: Whitechapel
Party	Candidate	Votes	%	±%
Liberal	Stuart Samuel	1,731	59.2	+0.9
Conservative	Edgar Monteagle Browne	1,191	40.8	−0.9
Majority		540	18.4	+1.8
Turnout		2,922		
Liberal hold		Swing	+0.9	

1913 Whitechapel by-election
Party	Candidate	Votes	%	±%
Liberal	Stuart Samuel	1,722	52.5	−6.7
Unionist	Edgar Monteagle Browne	1,556	47.5	+6.7
Majority		166	5.0	−13.4
Turnout		3,278		
Liberal hold		Swing	-6.7	

General Election 1914–15:

Another General Election was required to take place before the end of 1915. The political parties had been making preparations for an election to take place and by the autumn of 1914, the following candidates had been selected;

- Liberal: Stuart Samuel
- Unionist:

1916 Whitechapel by-election
Party	Candidate	Votes	%	±%
Liberal	James Kiley	Unopposed		
Liberal hold				
