= Stuart Samuel (politician) =

British politician (1856–1926)

Stuart Samuel

Sir Stuart Montagu Samuel, 1st Baronet (24 October 1856 – 13 May 1926) was a British banker and Liberal politician who was Member of Parliament for Whitechapel.

== Life ==
Samuel was the elder brother of Herbert Samuel, 1st Viscount Samuel. He attended the Liverpool Institute and University College School, Hampstead, London. He served as Justice of the Peace for the county of London.

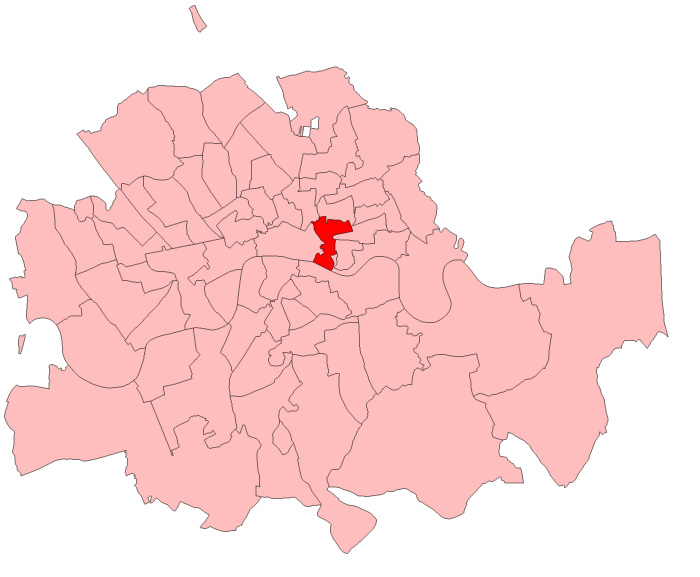
Whitechapel 1889-1916

In 1889 he stood as a candidate for the newly formed London County Council for the Progressive Party, the municipal wing of the Liberal Party. He contested Whitechapel, and was elected with 1,523 votes, along with his running mate, Charles Tarling, who polled 1,477 votes. He served for one term, before standing down in 1892.

Samuel was selected as Liberal candidate for Whitechapel in 1900, in succession to his uncle Samuel Montagu, who had been the MP. He knew the constituency well, having represented it on the LCC. He held the seat for the Liberals with an increased majority.

General election 1900: Whitechapel
Party	Candidate	Votes	%	±%
Liberal	Stuart Montagu Samuel	1,679	51.1	+0.7
Conservative	David Hope Kyd	1,608	48.9	−0.7
Majority		71	2.2	+1.4
Turnout			65.7	−2.3
Liberal hold		Swing	+0.7	

In November 1902 Samuel and his wife travelled to India to attend the 1903 Delhi Durbar marking the accession of King Edward VII as Emperor of India.

When the Liberal Party won the 1906 election with a landslide, he was again returned at Whitechapel.

General election 1906: Whitechapel
Party	Candidate	Votes	%	±%
Liberal	Stuart Montagu Samuel	1,925	55.1	+4.0
Conservative	David Hope Kyd	1,569	44.9	−4.0
Majority		356	10.2	+8.0
Turnout			81.7	+16.0
Liberal hold		Swing	+4.0	

The Liberal Party faced the elections in 1910 against a resurgent Conservative Party. Despite this challenge, Samuel was re-elected with an increased majority, at both 1910 elections.

General election January 1910: Whitechapel
Party	Candidate	Votes	%	±%
Liberal	Stuart Montagu Samuel	1,963	58.3	+3.2
Conservative	Weir Greenlees	1,402	41.7	−3.2
Majority		561	16.6	+6.4
Turnout				
Liberal hold		Swing	+3.2	

General election December 1910: Whitechapel
Party	Candidate	Votes	%	±%
Liberal	Stuart Montagu Samuel	1,731	59.2	+0.9
Conservative	Edgar Monteagle Browne	1,191	40.8	−0.9
Majority		540	18.4	+1.8
Turnout				
Liberal hold		Swing	+0.9	

Over the course of four general election campaigns in Whitechapel, Samuel had increased the Liberal share of the vote each time, taking it from 50.4% to 59.2%, changing the constituency from a marginal to a safe seat.

Escutcheon of the Samuel baronets of Chelwood Vetchery

On 8 July 1912 Samuel was created a baronet, of Chelwood Vetchery.

In April 1913 he undertook a contract for the Government, which required him to resign his seat and face re-election at a by-election. His Conservative opponent from 1910 ran against him in the by-election. He was re-elected with a reduced majority.

1913 Whitechapel by-election
Party	Candidate	Votes	%	±%
Liberal	Sir Stuart Montagu Samuel	1,722	52.5	−6.7
Unionist	Edgar Monteagle Browne	1,556	47.5	+6.7
Majority		166	5.0	−13.4
Turnout				
Liberal hold		Swing	-6.7	

Samuel retired from politics in 1916.

Parliament of the United Kingdom
Preceded by Samuel Montagu	Member of Parliament for Whitechapel; 1900–1916	Succeeded by James Daniel Kiley
Baronetage of the United Kingdom
New creation	Baronet (of Chelwood Vetchery); 1912–1926	Extinct
Preceded by Godlee baronets	Samuel baronets of Chelwood Vetchery; 8 July 1912	Succeeded by Smith baronets
