= National Prohibition Party (UK) =

- President: Harold Goldsmith (1900s-1940s)
- First Secretary: Axel Gustafson
- Founded: December 1887
- Dissolved: 1949
- Headquarters: London
- Newspaper: The Prohibitionist
- Ideology: Prohibition
- International affiliation: World Prohibition Fellowship

The National Prohibition Party was a minor party in the United Kingdom which advocated the prohibition of alcohol.

The party originated in 1887. In April, Axel Gustafson put an advert in the Christian Commonwealth magazine listing a manifesto closely based on that of the American Prohibition Party. A preliminary conference was held in May, presided over by the Reverend G. Brooks and the Reverend Frederick Hastings. The party was officially founded in December, and joined the World Prohibition Fellowship.

The party maintained a low level of activity and did not run a candidate in a parliamentary election until the 1923 Whitechapel and St George's by-election. S. M. Holden stood for the party in the by-election, and gained the backing of Scottish Prohibition Party Member of Parliament Edwin Scrymgeour, but he took only 130 votes and lost his deposit.

From 1933 until 1949, the party published the journal Prohibitionist. It dissolved in or soon after 1949.
