= S. M. Holden =

British journalist and political activist

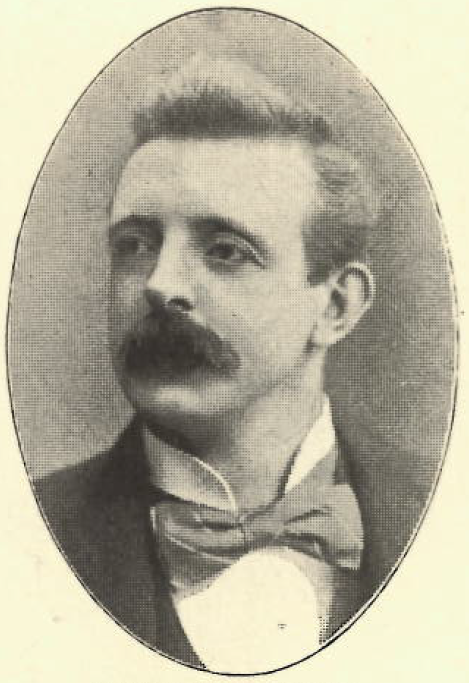
- Holden, around 1900
- Born: Servetus Mortimer Holden; 29 August 1862; Oswaldtwistle, England
- Died: 1 December 1943 (aged 81); Huncoat, England
- Occupations: Journalist and political activist
- Organization: National Prohibition Party

Servetus Mortimer Holden (29 August 1862 – 1 December 1943) was a British journalist and political activist. The only Parliamentary candidate ever put forward by the National Prohibition Party, he was associated with the labour movement and campaigned on old age pensions throughout his career.

== Early life and journalism ==
Born in Oswaldtwistle in Lancashire to family involved in trade unionism in the cotton industry, Holden left school at the age of seven to deliver newspapers. Over time, he worked as a newsagent, journalist and owner of the Accrington Advertiser. He claimed to be a founder member of the Independent Labour Party (ILP), and certainly organised a large meeting in Accrington which led to the creation of a local branch, although shortly before Holden's death, Francis Johnson denied that Holden was in fact a founder member of the party. In 1899, Holden launched a national weekly newspaper, the British Socialist News, although this was not a success.

During 1906, Holden briefly worked for two national newspapers, being appointed as Parliamentary Labour correspondent for the Daily Mail, and contributing a "Labour Notes" column for Reynolds' News. He lost a court case in 1910 against the Accrington Observer and Times, which accused him of copying its stories.

== Cricket ==
In his twenties and thirties, Holden was a keen cricketer, playing for Accrington Cricket Club and occasionally for other teams in the Lancashire League.

== Political activism ==
At the 1906 general election, Holden stood in Accrington. He described himself variously as the official Parliamentary Labour Party candidate, and as an ILP candidate, but he did not actually receive the backing of either the party and so funded his own campaign as an independent. His campaign focused on introducing old age pensions and a minimum wage of 30 shillings per week. He took third place in the election, with 619 votes.

Holden did not oppose British involvement in World War I, but was strongly against conscription. He also supported women's suffrage, and so joined Sylvia Pankhurst's Workers' Suffrage Federation. The group planned to stand him as their candidate in Accrington at the 1918 general election, but he did not ultimately appear on the ballot paper.

Pankhurst's group became part of the Communist Party of Great Britain early in the 1920s, but this did not appeal to Holden, who instead joined the National Prohibition Party. This party had been in existence since 1887, but maintained only a low level of activity, and had not previously stood in any Parliamentary election. Holden became its first and only candidate when he stood in the 1923 Whitechapel and St George's by-election. He took only 130 votes and lost his deposit.

Holden stood again for election at the 1929 general election in Preston, receiving 2,111 votes and describing himself as the candidate of the "Preston Progressive Labour Party". He stood again in the Preston by-election, later that year, but took only 410 votes. Following his defeats, he called a meeting in Preston, which he described as founding the "Progressive Labour Party" as a national organisation. He was the party's president, and announced that it would stand in eleven constituencies in Lancashire at the next general election. He planned to stand for the party at the 1930 Sheffield Brightside by-election, but did not ultimately do so, nor did the party stand in any seats at the 1931 general election. He again mooted a candidacy as an independent "Pensions and Co-operative" candidate in Preston at the 1935 general election, but did not stand.

Holden died on 1 December 1943, aged 81.

== Bibliography ==
- The Ups and Downs of William Gregson, for Fifty Years a Temporance Advocate (1887)
- The Glittering Prizes of Public Speaking: Fifty Years' Memories of Glorious Oratory (1925)
