= Barnett Janner =

British politician (1892–1982)

The Right Honourable The Lord Janner
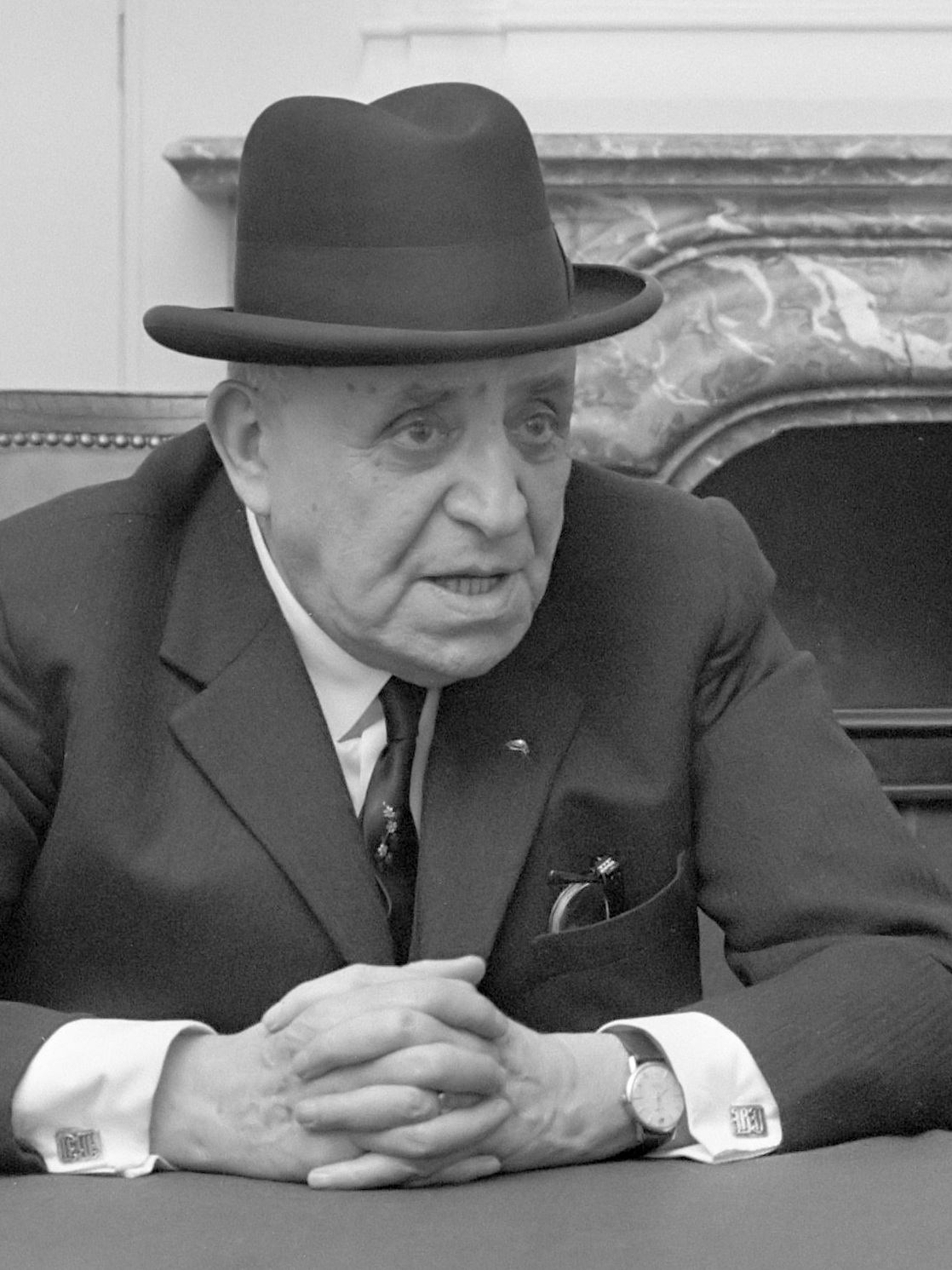
- Barnett Janner (1970)

Member of Parliament for Leicester North West Leicester West (1945–1950)
- In office 5 July 1945 – 29 May 1970
- Preceded by: Harold Nicolson
- Succeeded by: Greville Janner

Member of Parliament for Whitechapel and St George's
- In office 27 October 1931 – 25 October 1935
- Preceded by: James Henry Hall
- Succeeded by: James Henry Hall

Personal details
- Born: 20 June 1892 Luokė, Kovno Governorate, Russian Empire
- Died: 4 May 1982 (aged 89)
- Spouse: Elsie Sybil Cohen (m. 1927)

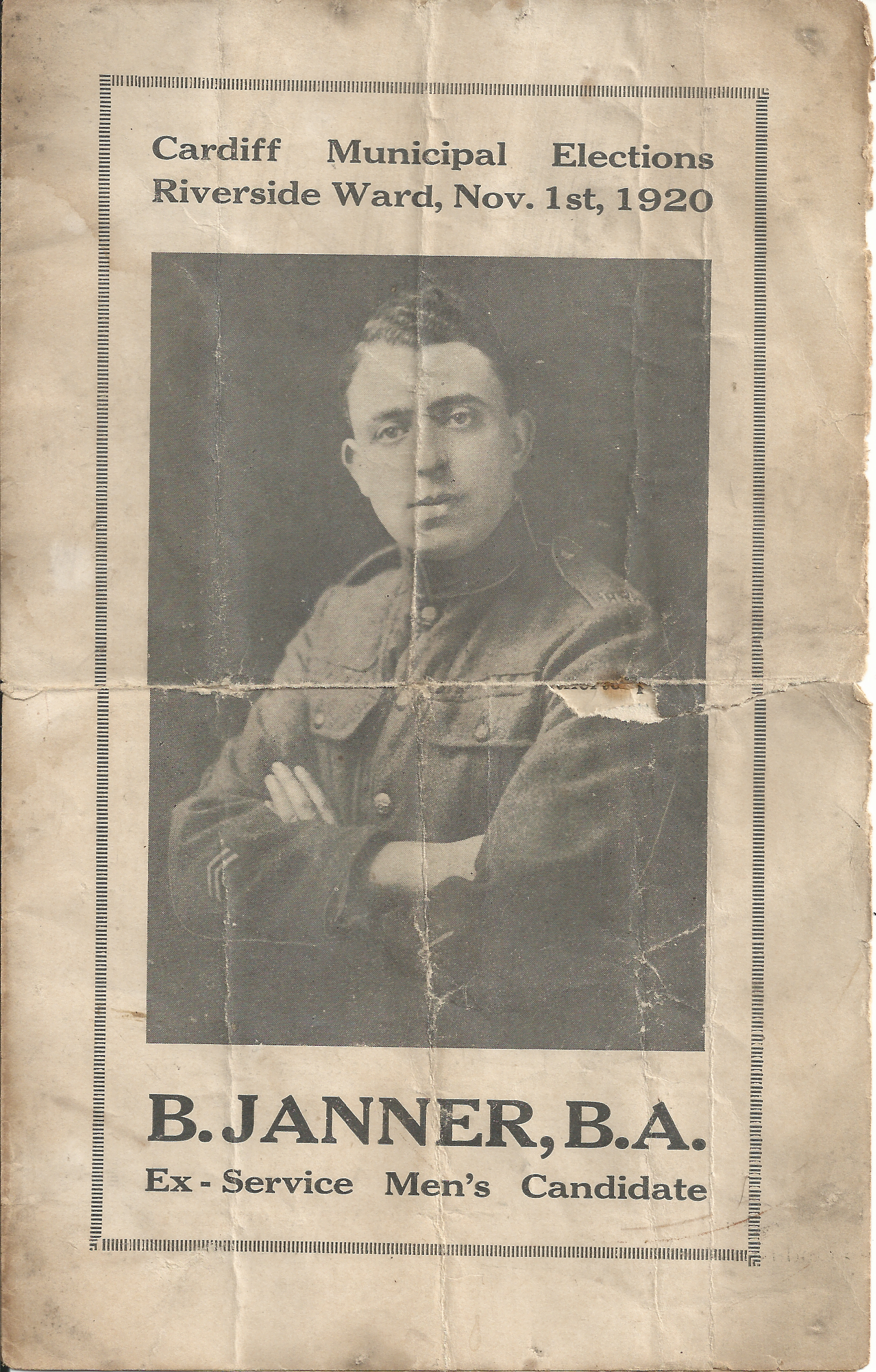
1920 Cardiff City Council election poster

Barnett Janner, Baron Janner (20 June 1892 – 4 May 1982), was a British politician who was elected as a Liberal Member of Parliament (MP) and later as a Labour MP.

== Early life ==
Janner was born ברוך אהרון בן יהושע (Baruch Aharon ben Yehoshua) to a Litvak family in Luokė in the Kovno Governorate of the Russian Empire, in what is now Lithuania. He was the son of Joseph and Gertrude Janner. At the age of nine months, his family, who were Orthodox Jews, moved to Barry, Glamorgan, Wales, where his father opened a furniture shop.

Janner was educated at the local school before obtaining a scholarship to attend the University College of South Wales and Monmouthshire at Cardiff. He was president of the students' union and edited the college magazine. He graduated with a BA in English and mathematics in 1914, before serving in the Royal Garrison Artillery during the First World War. Having studied law before the war, he was admitted as solicitor in 1919 and established a legal practice in Cardiff.

== Liberal politics ==
Janner entered politics in 1920 when he stood unsuccessfully for election to Cardiff City Council as a candidate of the Comrades of the Great War. Three years later he had joined the Liberal Party, but again failed to gain a seat on the council. In 1926 he was elected to the Board of Deputies of British Jews, and subsequently became a member of the executive of the British Zionist Federation.

At the 1929 general election he was the Liberal candidate for Cardiff Central, but failed to be elected. Later in the year he moved to Hendon, north London, and took up employment as company secretary and solicitor for his father-in-law's business.

In 1930, Harry Gosling, the sitting Labour MP for the Whitechapel and St George's constituency in the East End of London died. Janner was chosen to contest the resulting by-election. The area had a large Jewish population, and he campaigned in opposition to the government's policy on Palestine, but was narrowly defeated. Ten months later at the 1931 general election Janner again contested the Whitechapel seat for the Liberals, this time being returned to the House of Commons. At the next general election in 1935 Janner stood as a Liberal and Anti-Fascist candidate, but was one of many Liberals to lose their seats, with the Labour Party regaining the seat.

== Labour politics ==
Within a year of losing his seat as a Liberal, Janner had joined the Labour Party, and was quickly chosen as prospective candidate for Leicester West, which was held by National Labour with a small majority. In the event there was no election for ten years because of the Second World War.

Janner returned to Parliament ten years later, when he was elected at the 1945 general election as Labour MP for Leicester West, defeating Harold Nicolson the incumbent National Labour MP. When that constituency was abolished for the 1950 election, he was re-elected for the new Leicester North West constituency. He held that seat until he retired from the Commons at the 1970 general election, when his seat was held for Labour by his son Greville.

Knighted in 1961, Janner was created a life peer on 20 June 1970 and took the title Baron Janner, of the City of Leicester.

== Jewish community ==
Janner held many positions in the Jewish community, including President of the Board of Deputies of British Jews, 1955–64.

== Personal life ==
In 1927, Janner married Elsie Sybil Cohen, daughter of the owner of a furniture store. Their son Greville Janner, later Baron Janner of Braunstone, succeeded his father as the Labour MP for Leicester North-West in 1970.

== See also ==
- Gan Ner

== Bibliography ==
- Elsie Janner, Barnett Janner: A Personal Portrait. London: Robson Books, 1984
- Leigh Rayment's Peerage Pages
- Leigh Rayment's Historical List of MPs
- Who Was Who

Parliament of the United Kingdom
Preceded by James Henry Hall	Member of Parliament for Whitechapel and St George's; 1931–1935	Succeeded by James Henry Hall
Preceded by Harold Nicolson	Member of Parliament for Leicester West; 1945–1950	Constituency abolished
New constituency	Member of Parliament for Leicester North West; 1950–1970	Succeeded by Greville Janner
