= Limehouse Cut =

Canal in East End of London, England

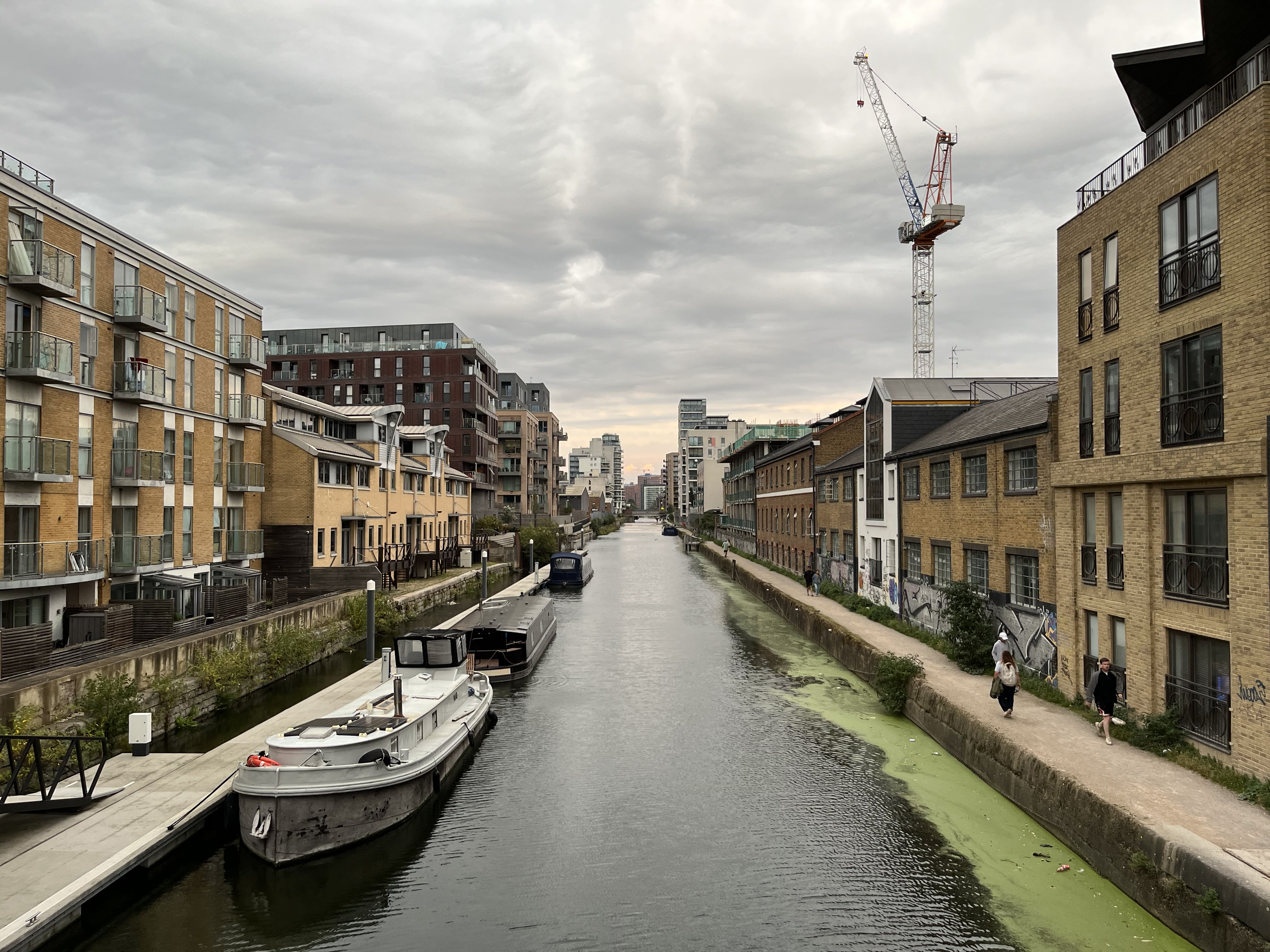
- Looking North East along the Limehouse Cut
- Interactive map of Limehouse Cut

Specifications
- Status: Open
- Navigation authority: Canal and River Trust

History
- Original owner: Trustees of the Lee Navigation
- Principal engineer: John Smeaton; Thomas Yeoman
- Other engineers: James Meadows Rendel; Nathaniel Beardmore
- Date of act: 1766
- Date of first use: 1769

Geography
- Start point: Bow Locks
- End point: Limehouse Basin
- Connects to: (part of) Lee Navigation

The Limehouse Cut is a largely straight, broad canal in the London Borough of Tower Hamlets in east London which links the lower reaches of the Lee Navigation to the River Thames. Opening on 17 September 1770, and widened for two-way traffic by 1777, it is the oldest canal in the London area. Its original purpose was to provide a short cut for barges bringing grain and malt from the Lee to the City of London. Although short, it has a diverse social and industrial history. Formerly discharging directly into the Thames, since 1968 it has done so indirectly by a connection through Limehouse Basin.

The Cut is about 1.4 miles (2.2 km) long. It turns in a broad curve from Bow Locks, where the Lee Navigation meets Bow Creek; it then proceeds directly south-west through Tower Hamlets, finally making a short hook to connect to Limehouse Basin.

== Origins ==
=== Before the Cut ===
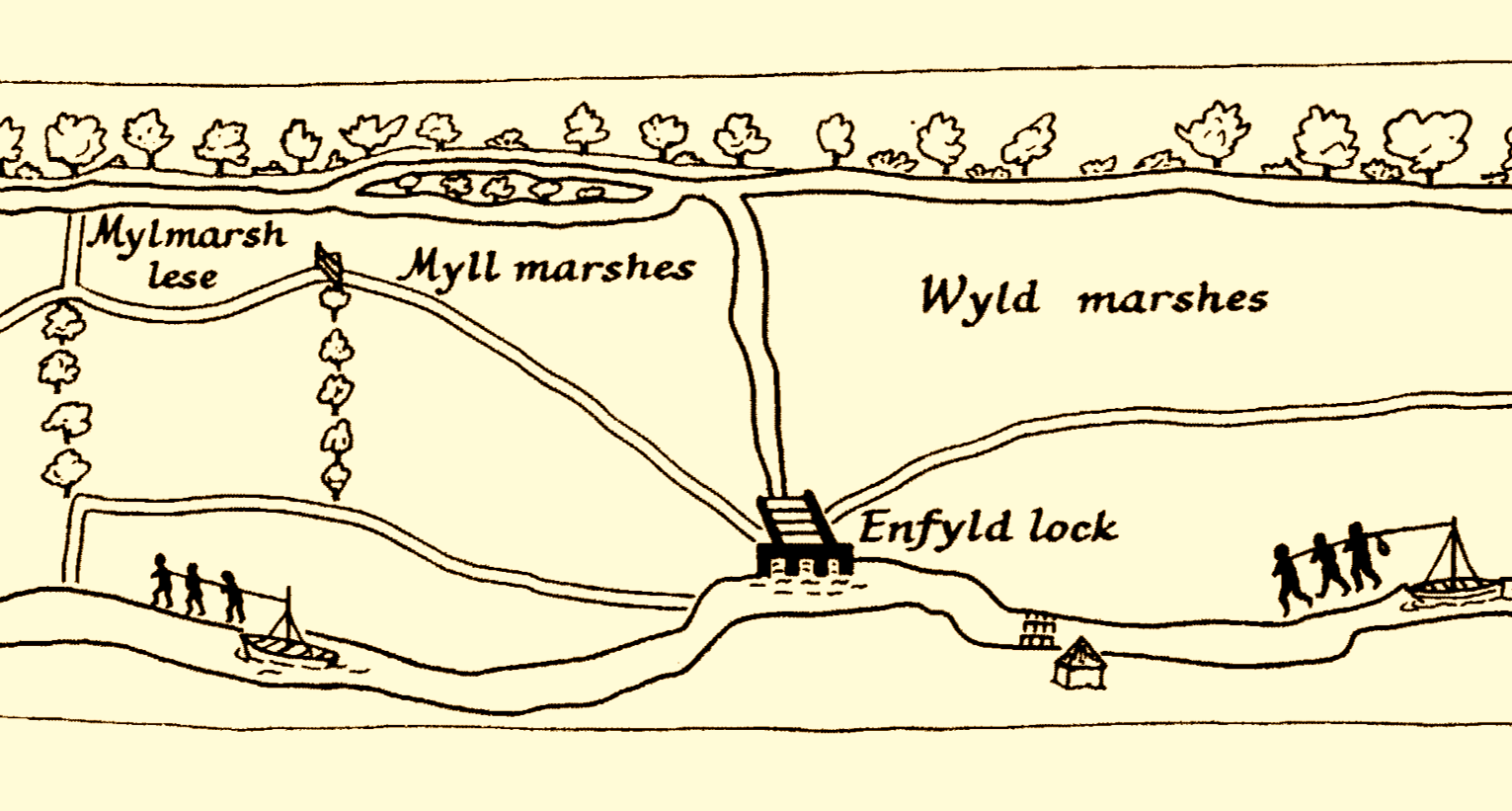
Elizabethan watermen towing barges near Enfield Lock. Detail from a large strip map of the River Lea preserved at Hatfield House

Already in Elizabethan times there was a vigorous river trade between towns on the River Lea and the City of London, but watermen had to await the tides and row round the Isle of Dogs. Thus, in 1588 (wrote G. B. G. Bull):

A fleet of 44 barges, bearing such names as Maltsack, Ramshead, Greyhound, Pheasant, Primrose, Hind and Cock, with a total capacity of 1100 quarters were engaged in transporting wheat and malt from the Hertfordshire markets of Ware and Hoddesdon to Queenhythe in London. Barges were loaded at Ware on Saturday, reached Bow Lock on Monday, and awaited the opening of the gates with the turn of the tide. Brisk rowing on the Thames brought the barges to London within four hours of clearing the Lea. The return journey, with passengers or with a load of coal, pig-iron or salt, began on the ebb tide. When the tide changed, Bow Lock opened once more. From thence to Waltham took six hours, and to Ware six hours more.

The goods came from even further afield: by 1663 the road from Huntingdon and Cambridge was worn out "by reason of the great Trade of Barley and Mault, that cometh to Ware, and so is conveyed by water to the City of London". In 1739, 25,000 tons of malt and "all sorts of Grain, Flower, and other Commodities" went by the Lee. When the Limehouse Cut was built this traffic had increased to 36,000 tons—about a quarter of London's grain supply.

=== Planning and authorisation ===
The Limehouse Cut was authorised by the Lee Navigation Improvement Act 1767 (7 Geo. 3. c. 51), after the engineer John Smeaton identified the need to make several cuts and to replace existing flash locks on the river with pound locks. It occurred to Smeaton as an afterthought to have a cut from Bromley to the Thames at Limehouse and his assistant Thomas Yeoman had the same idea. Thomas Yeoman was appointed as the surveyor to the River Lee trustees, and one of his first tasks was to investigate a route for the Limehouse Cut. As authorised by Parliament, it would provide a short-cut from the Lee Navigation at Bromley-by-Bow to the River Thames "at or near Limehouse Bridge Dock", avoiding the tortuous curves of the lower reaches of the River Lea at Bow Creek, and the need to wait for the tide to make the long detour round the Isle of Dogs. The trustees accepted Yeoman's proposed route on 14 September 1767, which would terminate at Dingley's Wharf at Limehouse.

=== Excavation and lock building ===
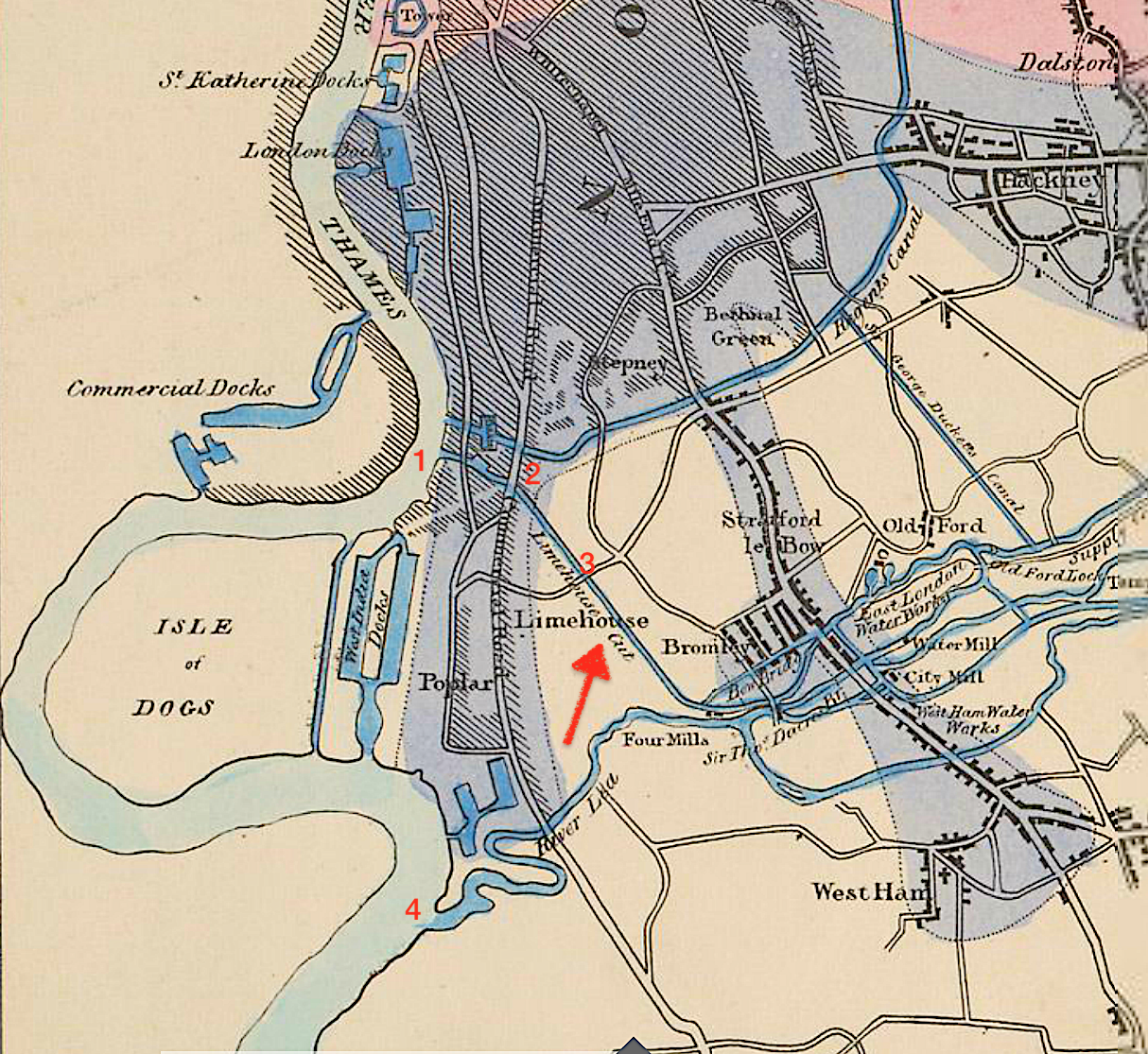
The area in 1834. From Thomas Telford's Map of the New River from its Source near the Town of Ware to London. 1 Limehouse Lock 2 Britannia Bridge 3 Stinkhouse Bridge 4 Leamouth (traditional outlet)

The contract for the excavation of the cut was split into two, with Charles Dingley, owner of the wharf and also a trustee, getting the southern section up to Rose Lane and Jeremiah Ilsley getting the northern section to Bow Locks. Dingley contracted to make his end of the canal for 10d. per foot; Ilsley's charge was 7d. per foot.

The construction of Bromley Lock was let as a separate contract, which was awarded to a millwright from Bromley called Mr Cooper, who also built some of the locks on the Edmonton Cut. The lock into the Thames was designed by Mr Collard, another of the trustees, who produced a model and plan for the structure. The estimated cost was £1,547, but Collard had miscalculated the length, and it had to be increased by 16 feet (4.9 m), resulting in the estimate's rising to £1,696.

=== Inauguration and widening ===
By 1769, barges were using part of the cut, and in May 1770 an opening date of 2 July was set. However, 60 feet (18 m) of brickwork failed, and fell into the canal, delaying the opening until 17 September. There were further problems in December, when a bridge collapsed, blocking the canal, but once the teething problems were resolved, traffic increased steadily.

The cut was only wide enough for one barge, and in May 1772, a passing place was added, but by March 1773, the company had decided to widen the whole cut, so that barges could pass at any point. The contract for the work was given to Jeremiah Ilsley in June 1776, and the widened cut was operational from 1 September 1777, having cost £975.

=== Further widening ===
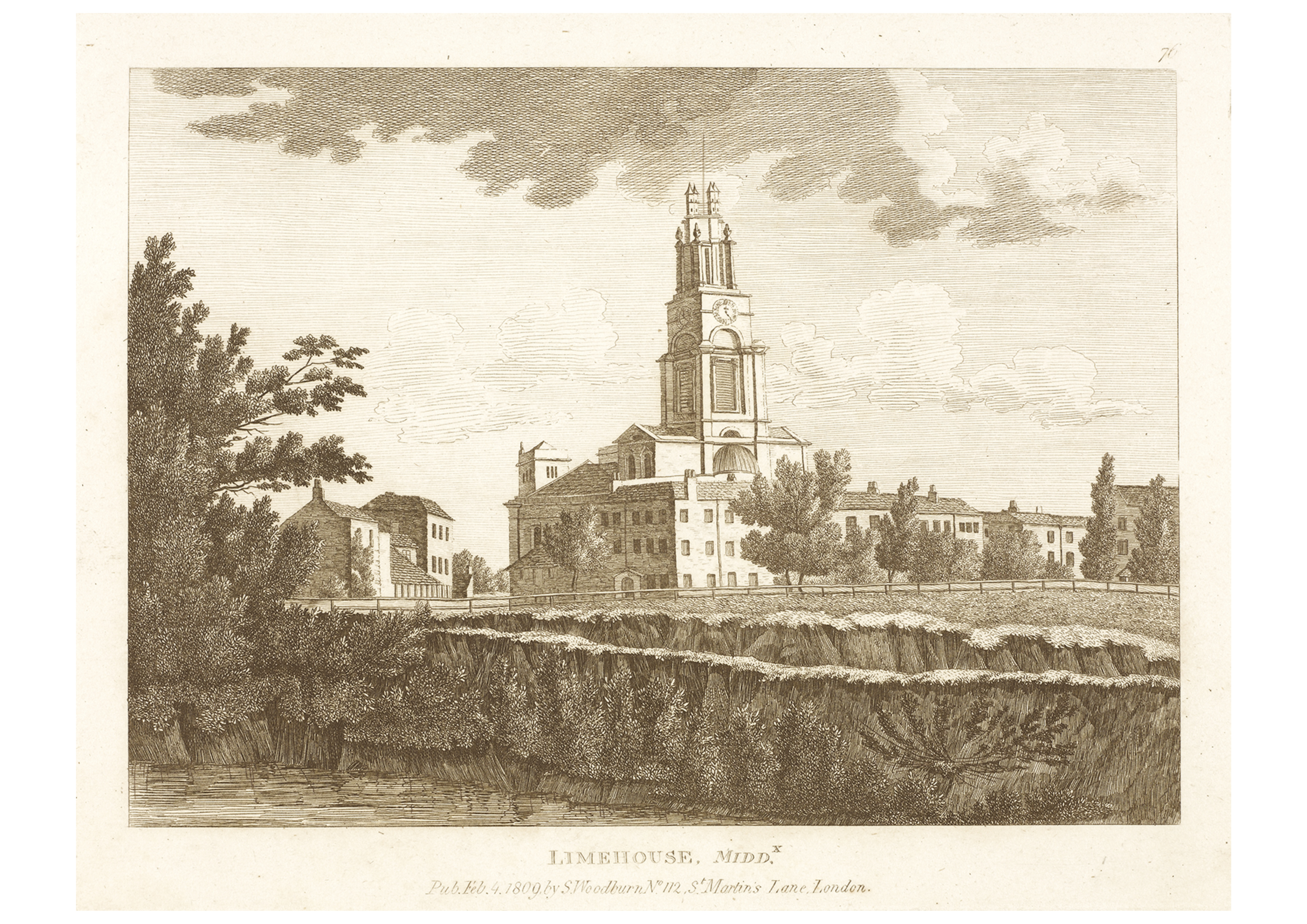
Limehouse Cut in 1809 — apparently being widened. In the background is St Anne's Church and the recently built Commercial Road.

At some stage the Cut was further widened from 55 feet to its present width of 75 feet. When this happened is unclear. It has been suggested it happened during the Beardmore modifications of the 1850s (see below).

=== Hydraulics ===
Although the newly constructed Limehouse Cut could save vessels having to navigate down Bow Creek and around the Isle of Dogs, its performance was suboptimal. Unusually, it was a tidal canal. It could be short of water and liable to shoal.

At the northern end of the Cut was a conflict with a property called Four Mills, which was in fact a group of five tidal water wheels. Nathaniel Beardmore, the Lee trustees' engineer, described the conflict as it was in early Victorian times:

The Four Mills Head has always formed part of the navigation of the River Lee, but as the water was the common property of so many [other] mills [as well], it became, systematically, a race, after each period of high water, which of them should draw the fastest, and practically, the result was always in favour of the Four Mills, which had five large wheels, with the greatest fall and the largest head-channel ... Under these circumstances, the interest of the proprietor of the Four Mills was entirely adverse to any regularity of navigation below Old Ford Lock; for in the Four Mills Head, unless barges could travel during about one hour of high water, they were constantly liable to take the ground when the water was lowered by the working of the mills; and, as the Limehouse Cut depended entirely on the tidal water, and was not navigable at neaps, there were frequently intervals of some days, during which there was no means of affording a passage to the Thames.

At an 1850 inquiry by William Cubitt it was explained that because the Cut was unnavigable for four or five days at neap tides, barges had no way out to the Thames except via Bow Creek (which was toll free). Hence the tolls were lost.

The Cut had no locks except at either end—despite the fall in the land, which was 17½ feet. The shallowest point was therefore critical. "Limehouse Cut had always occasioned a great deal of trouble", added Beardmore, "on account of the water falling short, and of the slipping of the moving sands and gravel, which lay where the London clay was denuded". No systematic attempt to improve the navigation was made until the Victorian era.

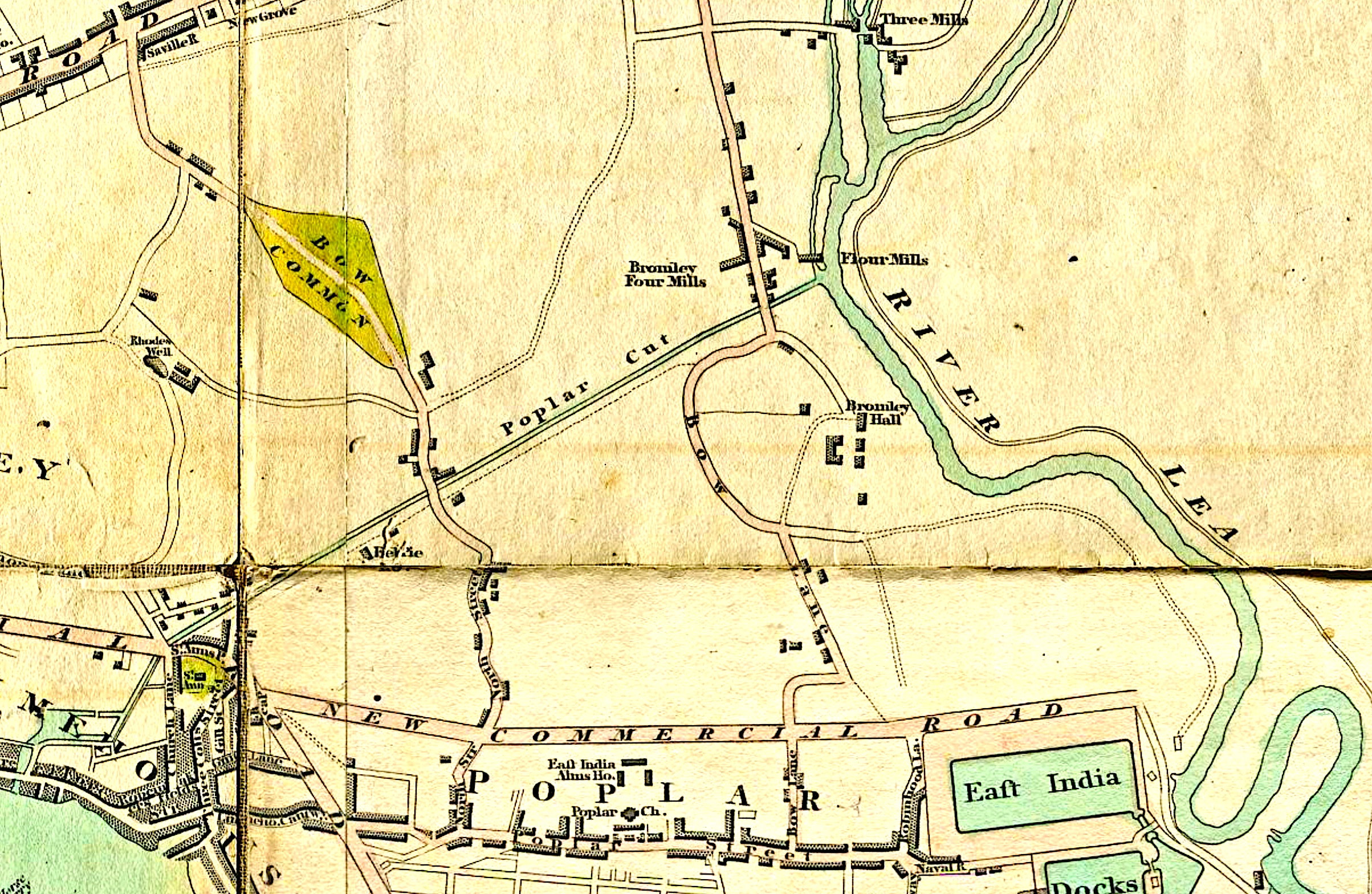
Limehouse Cut c.1800, the only canal in London—called 'Poplar Cut' in this map

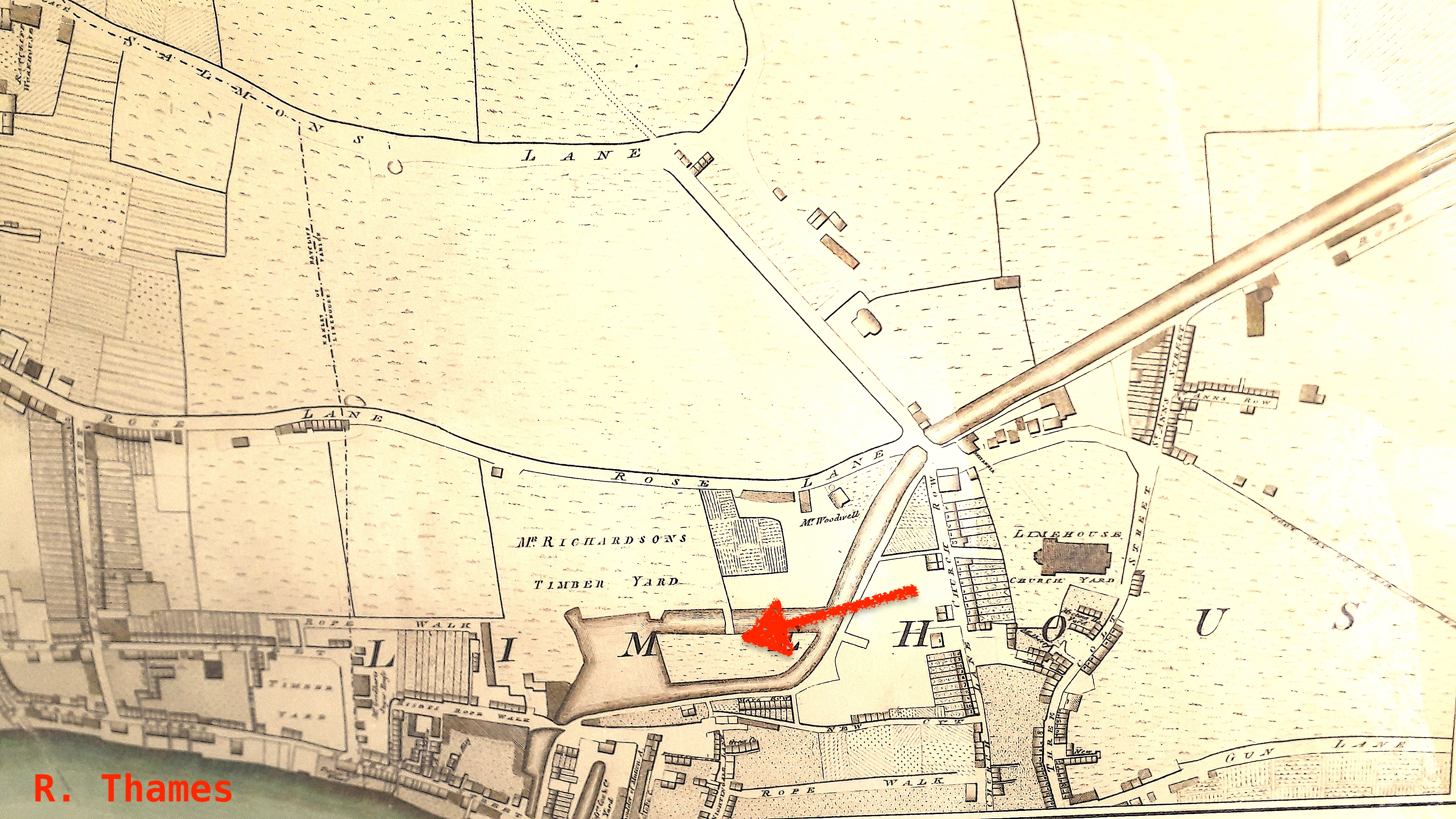
River Thames or Limehouse end, including the basin and its island (arrow)

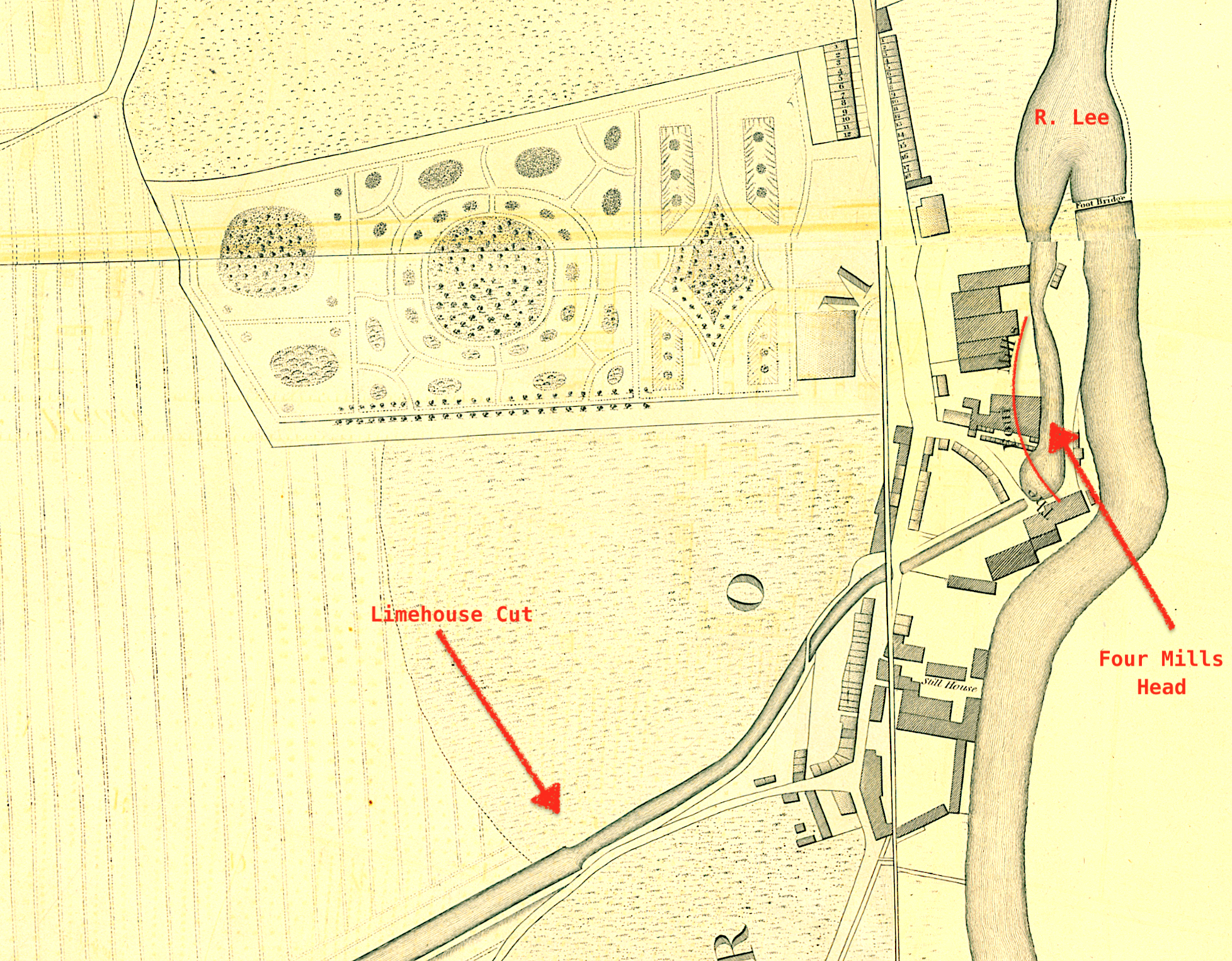
River Lee or Bromley end, showing junction with the Four Mills Head

=== The Limehouse basin—first of three ===
Near its Limehouse end the Cut was widened to form a basin with an island in it. This was the first Limehouse basin, made 25 years before the better known Regent's Canal Dock. The reason for this is described below, see "The Island in the Cut and its mills".

== Victorian modifications ==
=== Railway competition ===
By 1843 a railway had been built from Stratford to Hertford: it became the Eastern Counties Railway. The line ran beside the River Lee and threatened its carrying trade.

=== Closing the Four Mills ===
As an essential first step in 1847 the trustees of the Lee Navigation bought out the troublesome Four Mills and gradually stopped them using water power.

=== James Rendel's scheme ===
In 1849 James Rendel was asked to devise a scheme to improve the infrastructure, which was dilapidated. He reported that "if [the Navigation] is to compete successfully with Railways, it should be made an efficient branch of the Thames, viz. navigable by the largest class of barges there employed". He proposed, besides numerous improvements on the river proper, the reconstruction of Bromley Lock; deepening the Limehouse Cut; forming a towing path under Britannia Bridge (Commercial Road); and the construction of a new outfall lock into the Thames, with cills 19 feet below Trinity High Water, and with tide gates.

=== Financing and politics ===
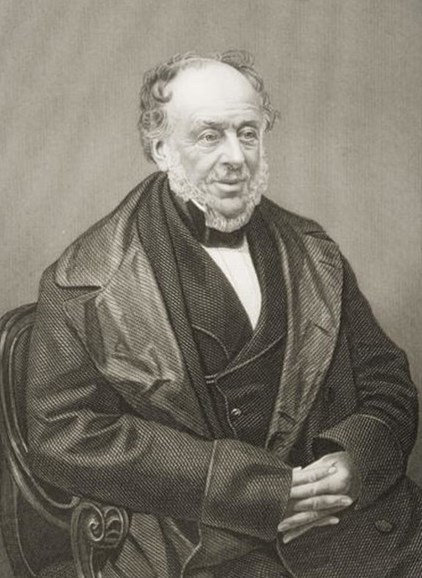
The Marquess of Salisbury, chief promoter of the scheme

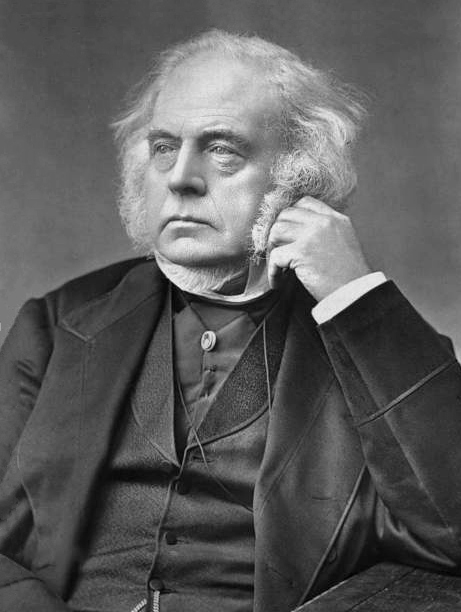
John Bright, the radical MP who denounced it

The engineering of the Limehouse Cut was affected by political disputes upstream. The Lee had multiple uses. It was a highway for traders. It supplied London with drinking water. It powered grain mills. It was a sewer for towns and factories. There was no Conservancy Board to manage these clashing interests, just the trustees responsible for its navigation.

The navigation of the River Lee was governed by a board of 65–120 unpaid trustees, typically country magistrates. The most influential was James Gascoyne-Cecil, 2nd Marquess of Salisbury, who became chairman in 1851. A powerful nobleman with a deep knowledge of parliamentary procedure, his biographer has described him as an eighteenth century aristocrat in a nineteenth century world. Of the few trustees who used to turn up to meetings, only one was a trader who owned barges.

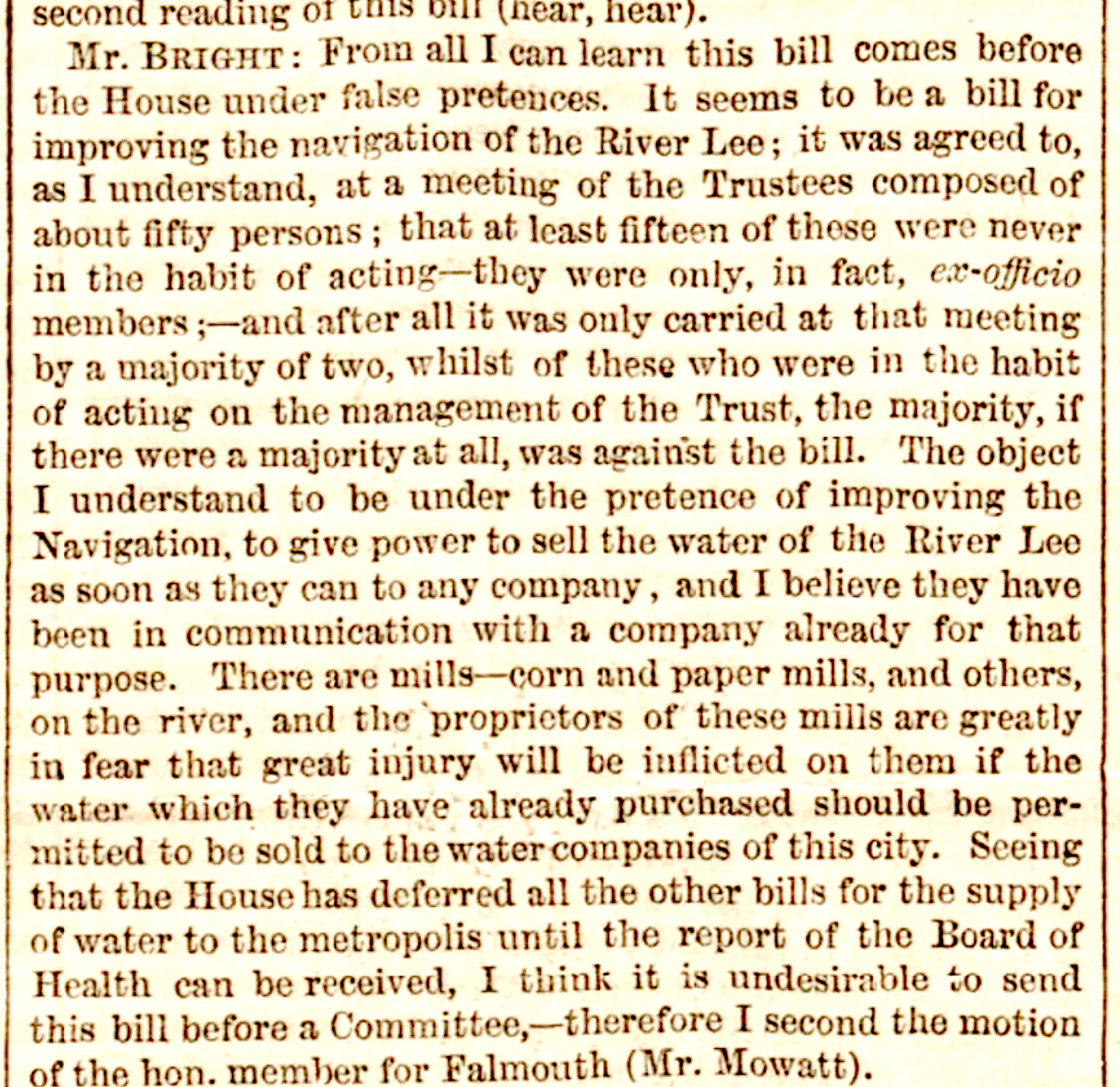
John Bright MP suspects a scam.

Rendel's estimate for his scheme was £230,000—about £30 million today—yet the Trust's revenue was small. However, John Marchant, clerk to the trustees, had hit on the idea of borrowing the capital and paying off the loans by selling more water to the London water companies. This was essential to the scheme's success, Hertford's MP William Cowper told Parliament.

The scheme was controversial. It was opposed by many river traders who complained the benefits were not worth the money and the Trust would incur large debts: meaning higher tolls. Its promoters were certain it would pay for itself. At an unusually large meeting of the Trust at Ware, the scheme was carried by 27–25 votes. A Bill was put before Parliament to authorise it and, despite opposition from radical politician John Bright—who suspected an ulterior motive—became law on 1 August 1850.

The pessimists proved correct. While the London water companies were interested in buying the water, and had said so, they had not tied themselves to a price; and soon showed who had the stronger bargaining power. First, the New River [Water] Company struck a deal with the town of Hertford to get water from the pure and copious River Mimram—an upstream tributary, outside the Lee Trust's jurisdiction. Then they and the East London Waterworks applied for Acts of Parliament of their own, by which they might extract the River Lee's water at no charge. There was litigation; the Trust ran into cashflow problems; and the eventual compromise was that the Companies got the whole of the River Lee's water—apart from that required for navigation—for comparatively small amounts.

The upshot was that though there were valuable improvements, the Trust incurred a large debt without any obvious means to pay it off. Though they had increased the tolls (sometimes steeply), they ran out of funds. Sacrifices had to be made, and were made on the Limehouse Cut.

=== Beardmore's implementation ===
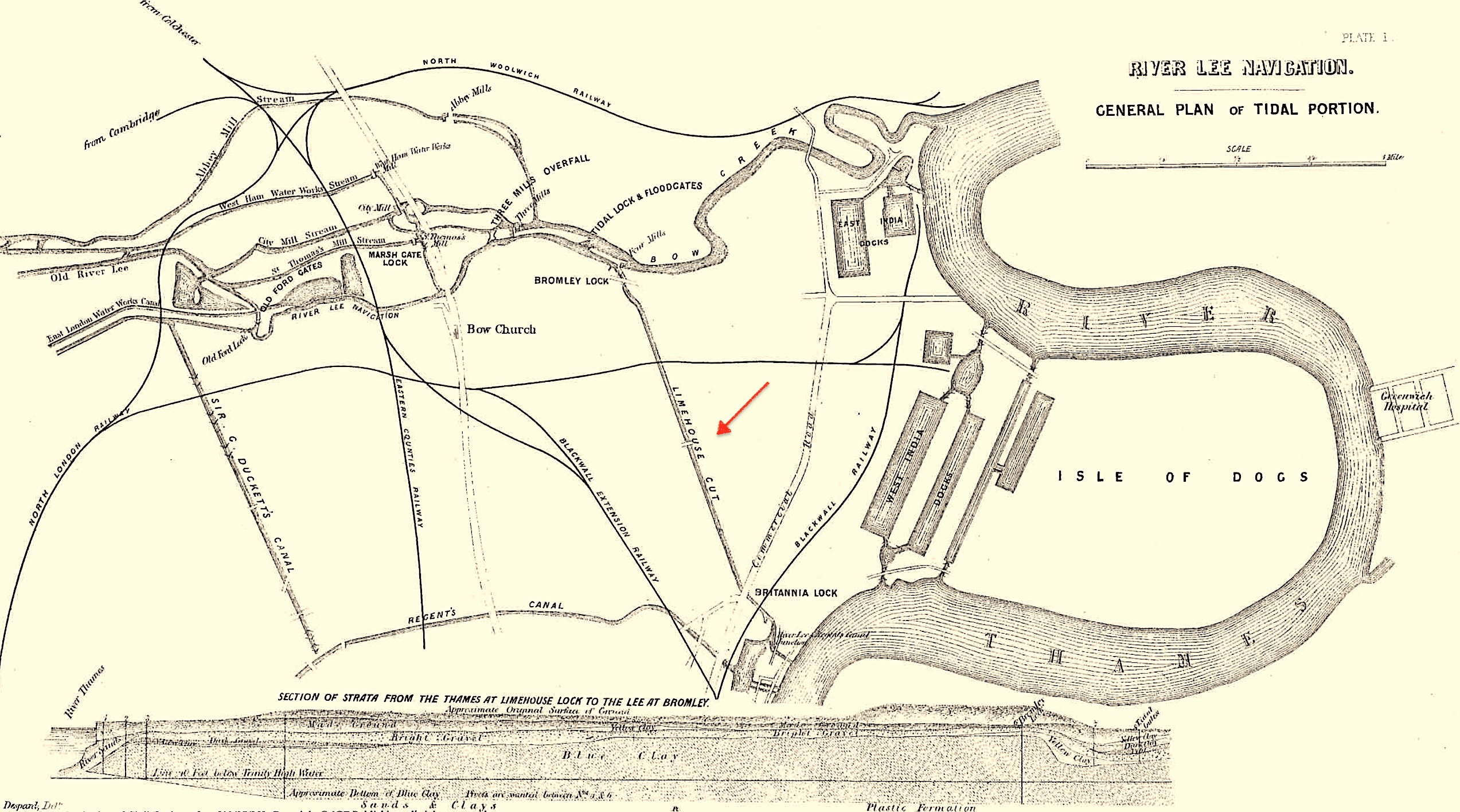
1854 improvements of the tidal Lee Navigation (general plan); the arrow indicates Limehouse Cut

Rendel's plans were implemented by his former pupil Nathaniel Beardmore. The first tranche of work was supposed to comprise the tidal portion (from the Thames to Old Ford), hence the Limehouse Cut. However funds ran out, work stopped in 1853, and some of Rendel's plans had to be curtailed. When more funding became available in 1855 it had to be devoted to non-tidal parts of the Lee.

Some changes were made before funds ran out, with the following effect. The governing level in Limehouse Cut was increased: the water was not allowed to fall 2 feet below Trinity High Water mark. The Cut under the Commercial Road bridge was made wider and given a towpath. Larger barges could now be handled:

Barge Dimension (max)	With old Lee Navigation	With improved Lee Navigation
Draught	4 feet	6 feet
Length	85 feet	110 feet
Beam	13 feet	19 feet (via Regent's Canal outlet)

These and other improvements were said to increase the tonnage on the Lee Navigation by 25% (but the tolls by 50%), despite competition from the Eastern Counties Railway.

==== The Regent's Canal Company: temporary link to their basin ====
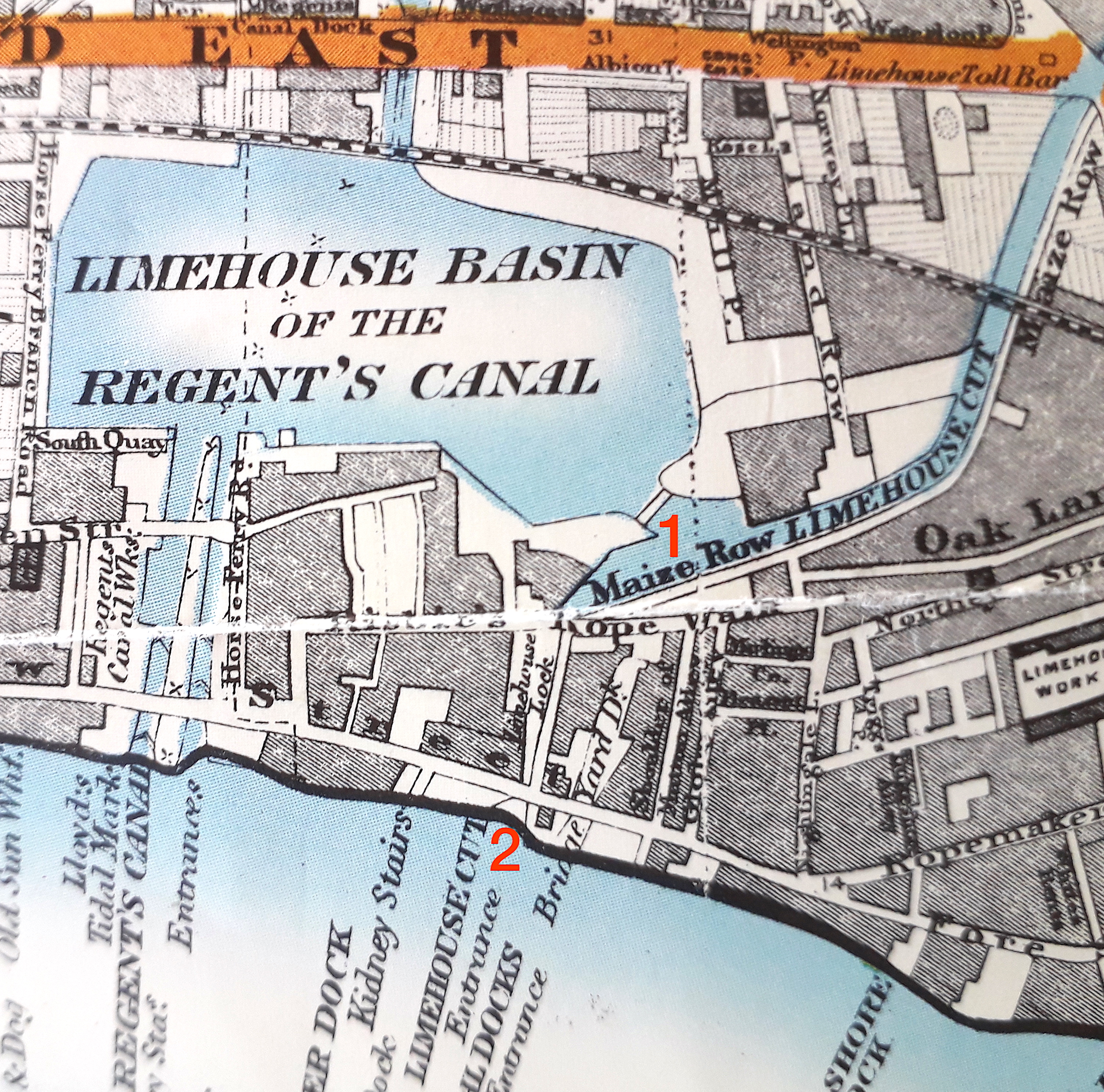
The short-lived Basin link 1 — an alternative to using the Thames lock 2

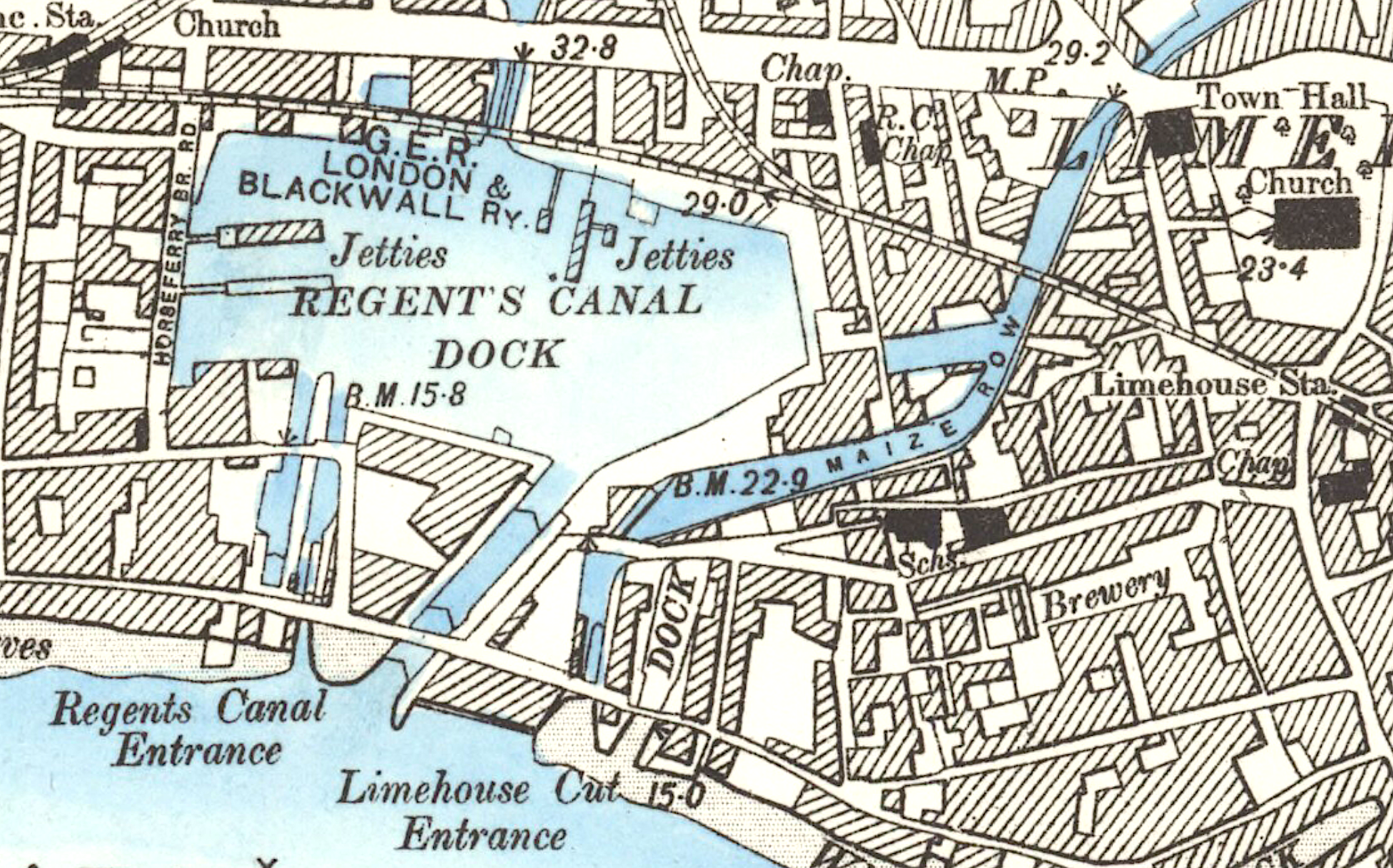
Independence. After the link had been filled in

The outlet to the Thames, "an old timber lock of small dimensions", had become "more and more ruinous". In October 1852 Beardmore reported that "The Limehouse Lock has bulged and the late Lock keepers house must be pulled down both to get at the repair required and because the house is in the act of Tumbling down".

At about this time the Lee trustees, who were afterwards alleged to be too cosy with the Regent's Canal Company, agreed to sell it the southern portion of the Limehouse Cut. Since it was public trust property it could not be done without the sanction of Parliament, to whom a Bill was presented. The nearby Regent's Canal Dock, already enlarged to a 9-acre basin, was crowded with shipping so the Company intended to enlarge it further, absorbing Limehouse Cut's lock and the remnants of its basin.

While this matter was pending a link was dug (early 1854) to the Regent's Canal Dock, thus affording an alternative outlet to the river. Work south of the Commercial road was supervised jointly by Beardmore and the Regent Canal's engineer.

The new route to the Thames could get congested and the proposal was not popular with the Lee and Stort bargemen.

The river Lee was a public highway for all the Queen's subjects to go upon with their goods and Barges when and where they pleased ... as much a public highway as Ratcliffe Highway or Cheapside

said a Harlow bargeman. They disliked the prospect of being under Regent's Canal regulations. They organised meetings, learnt to use the democratic machinery of the day, and defeated the proposal in Parliament reputedly at small cost to themselves. The Regent's Canal Company had to be content with a more modest dock enlargement and in May 1864 the link was filled in.

Beardmore replaced the old timber Limehouse Lock with an "economical structure" which was wider and had arched sheets overhead to stop bulging, after the Dutch fashion.

==== Britannia Bridge and Lock ====
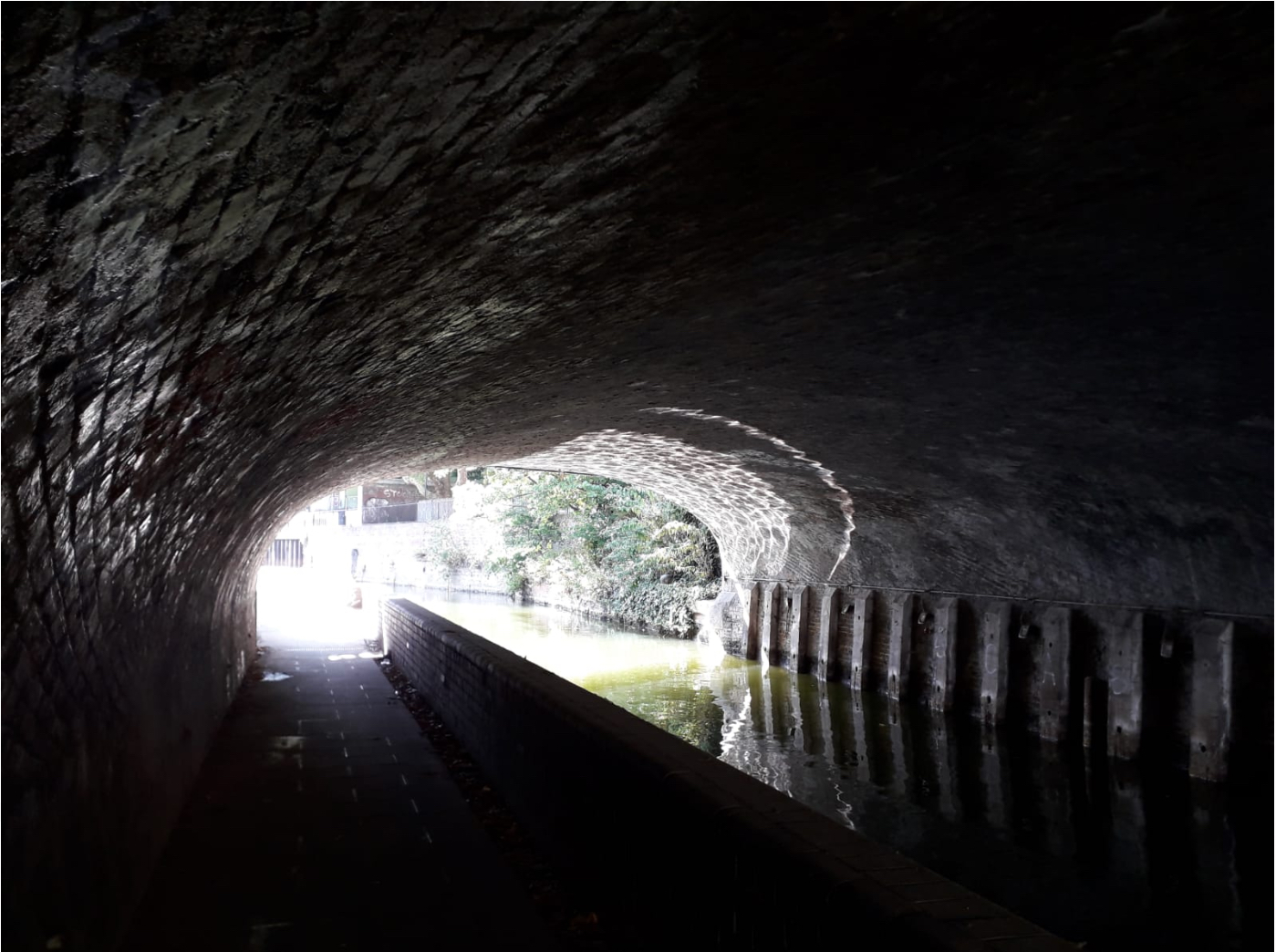
Britannia Bridge in 2019. An 1853 example of a skew arch bridge

Britannia Bridge is where the Commercial Road crosses the Cut. It was named after the Britannia Tavern (c.1770-1911), which can be found in Horwood's 1819 map and is visible in the image Limehouse in 1809 (above, "Further widening"), left background. The original bridge cramped the Cut and interrupted its towpath.

When the Limehouse Cut was connected to the Regent's Canal Dock (above), a potential hydraulic problem was created. Since the Limehouse Cut was tidal, but the Regent's Canal was not, at times water might escape from the Dock and move up the Cut. (Conversely, at other times water from the Cut might overfill the Dock.) To restrict the loss of water a new lock was built at Britannia Bridge. It was a double regulating lock, with gates pointing in both directions, and new wing walls so as to form, conjointly, a new and more spacious Bridge. Horses could pass along the new towpath underneath. The work was supervised jointly by Beardmore and the Regent Canal's engineer.

The lock gates were little used ("they never were, nor could be, used to keep out the tidal water, which comes into the Cut through many channels", wrote engineer Joe Child), and they were removed.

==== The new Bromley Lock ====
Bromley Lock was completely rebuilt in a slightly different position. Said Beardmore:

The old Bromley Entrance Lock of the Limehouse Cut, and the other works, were much dilapidated, and the 300 yards of the Cut, adjacent to the lock, having been originally made in rather heavy cutting, through London clay capped by running sands and gravel, had frequently slipped, and had been protected, from time to time, by piles; these again had slipped and formed such serious impediments to the passage of the barges, that at every neap tide, the Cut was practically useless for several days. The works have, therefore, embraced the re-construction of Bromley Lock Entrance to the Limehouse Cut, and the deepening, widening, walling, and cutting down the slopes, on the portion above described.

The new lock was 137 feet long and 22 feet broad, with cills 11 feet below Trinity high water mark. In 1888 Joe Child (one of Beardmore's successors) wrote:

The pointings and chambers of these locks were so filled up with mud, rubbish, old pans and kettles thrown in that when the gates were closed for the purpose of drawing the water at Limehouse or Bow the leakage was so great that we could not keep a head of water in the Cut so that before again drawing it was necessary to clear out the locks which has been done but the gates at Bromley still leak very much ..and will require a short stoppage for repair.

Bromley Lock was finally removed; according to Lee historian Richard Thomas, one gate can still be seen, behind the floating towpath.

== Twentieth century modifications ==
Bow Locks were originally semi-tidal, as high spring tides flowed over the top of the locks, altering the level in the Limehouse Cut and the southern section of the Lee Navigation. They were modified in 2000, when a flood wall and an extra pair of flood gates were installed, enabling the lock to be used at all states of the tide and stabilising the level of the cut. Funding for the project was provided by the London Waterway Partnership.

Following the takeover of the canal by British Waterways in 1948, a vertical guillotine gate was fitted on the north side of Britannia Bridge but this was removed in the 1990s.

=== New link to Limehouse Basin ===
By the 1960s, the lock that connected the cut to the Thames was in need of replacement. It had been rebuilt in 1865, after the closing of the link to the Regents Canal Dock, and the design had included massive timber ties over the top of it to prevent bulging of the walls. These were eventually replaced with a steel cage, which served the same purpose. Access to the lock from the cut and from the Thames was awkward, and the gates were operated by winches and chains as the site was too narrow to accommodate balance beams. At the time, there was significant commercial activity on the cut, which would have been severely disrupted by the construction of a new lock. The solution adopted was to reinstate a link to the Regents Canal Dock. The route used in the 1860s could not be reused, as it was now covered by buildings, and so a new length of canal, only about 200 feet (61 m) long, was built. The new link was opened on 1 April 1968, when the tug Miriam towed four lighters through it. The old lock was then filled in but one of the winches was saved and was put on display at Hampstead Lock.

== Social and industrial history ==
=== The Island in the Cut and its mills ===
John Cary's New and Accurate Plan of London of 1795 shows that, by that date, a portion of the canal, near its outlet at Limehouse, had been expanded to form a large basin, with an island in the middle marked "Timber Yd", accessible by a causeway. This was the first basin in Limehouse, built 25 years before the better known Regent's Canal dock, a little to the west, which now bears that name. (There was yet another of that name: the western entrance to the West India Docks.). (Note: See Limehouse Basin#Not the first Limehouse basin)

==== Charles Dingley's sawmill ====
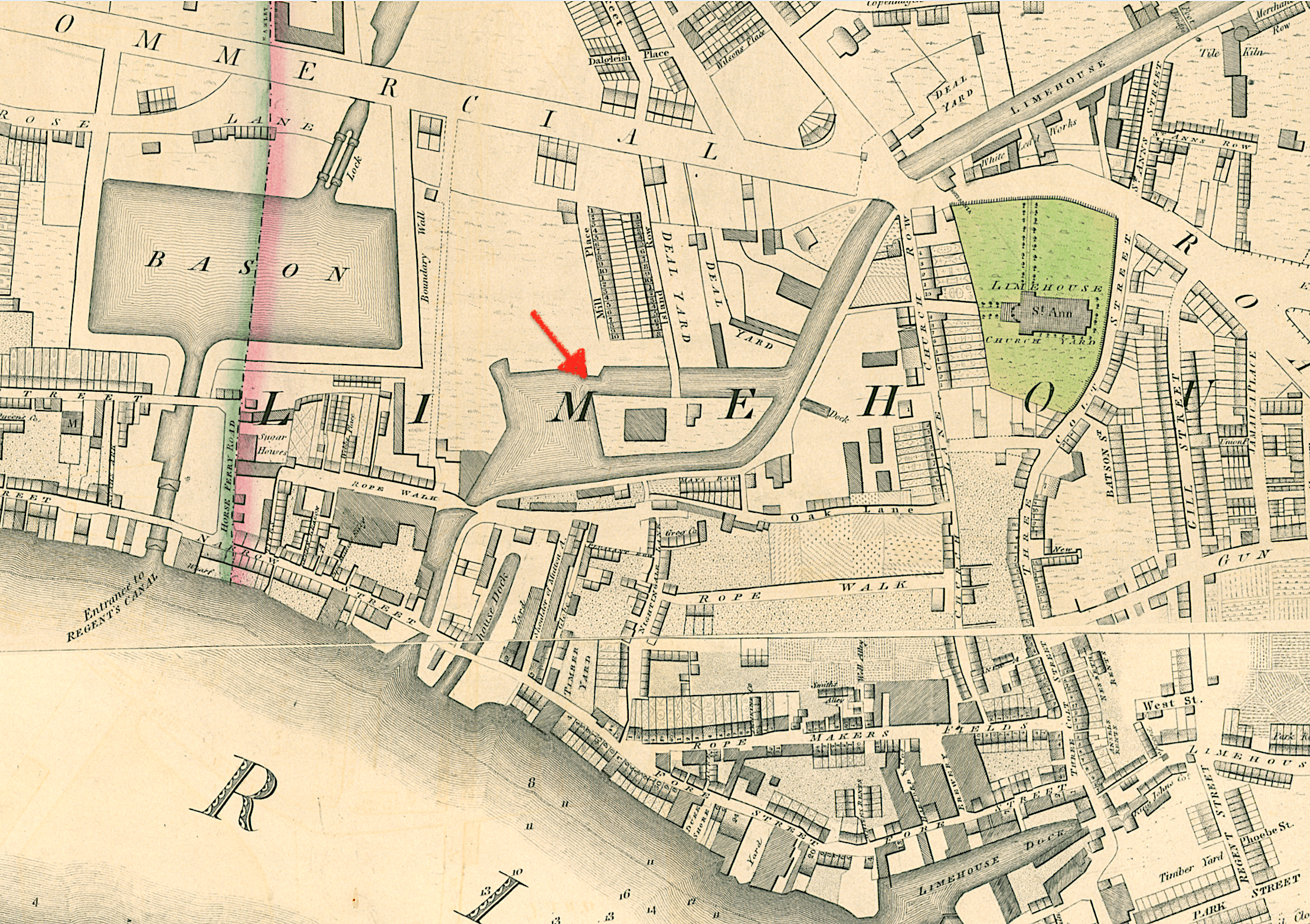
The Island, Limehouse Cut in 1819 (red arrow) and (left) the newly built Limehouse Basin of the Regent's Canal

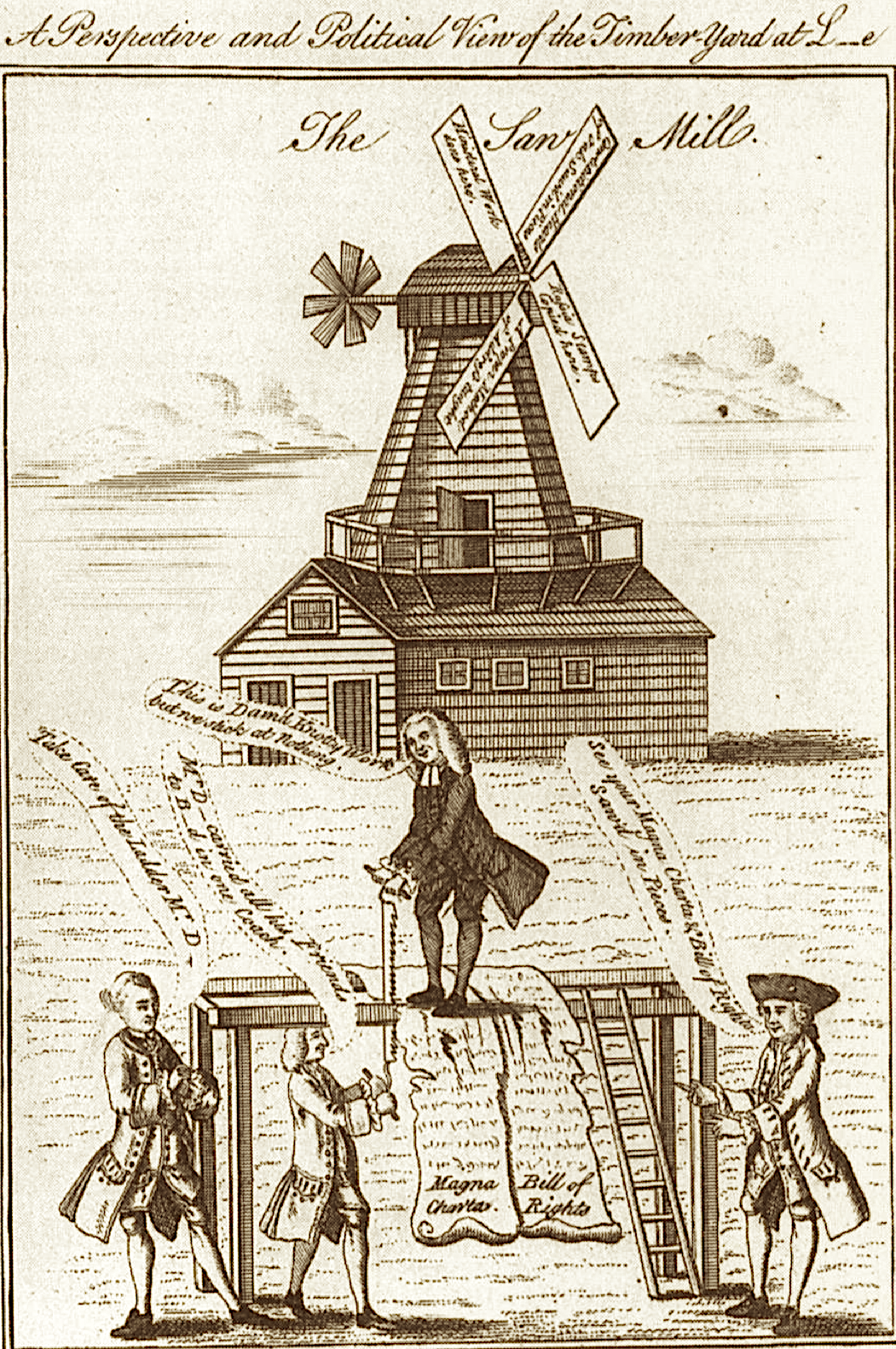
Election cartoon: Charles Dingley vs. John Wilkes, with the unpopular Dingley as the man who sawed up Englishmen's traditional rights.

In Richard Horwood's 1819 map (extract reproduced here) the basin with Island are drawn to scale; nearby rows of houses are named 'Island Row' and 'Mill Place', respectively. Those streets still exist in Limehouse but the "Island" and the "Mill" themselves are largely forgotten. They originated as follows.

Charles Dingley was an entrepreneur and speculator who built, amongst many other things, (Note: He also built the Marylebone, Euston, Pentonville and City Roads (op. cit.).) the southern end of the Limehouse Cut. At that time wooden planks were expensive because they were sawn by hand, or imported ready sawn; in England there was hostility to sawmills, which, for threatening the livelihood of hand-sawyers, were commonly thought to be illegal. Dingley, who was also a major timber merchant, decided to defy convention by building a wind-powered sawmill. He bought up a "stranglehold" of land in Limehouse and built the sawmill strategically close to the line of the intended Cut, which he may have promoted with that very intention. It was the only sawmill in England and did good business.

However, on 10 May 1768—the day of the St George's Fields Massacre riots—a mob of 500 men, including hand-sawyers, attacked his sawmill and destroyed the machinery—anticipating the Luddite machine-smashers of later years. It caused Parliament to pass the Malicious Injury Act 1769 (9 Geo. 3. c. 29) making it a felony to vandalise mills. Dingley repaired his mill by 1769. Surviving records are consistent with the island and basin being constructed to isolate and protect the repaired sawmill.

==== The Island Lead Mills ====
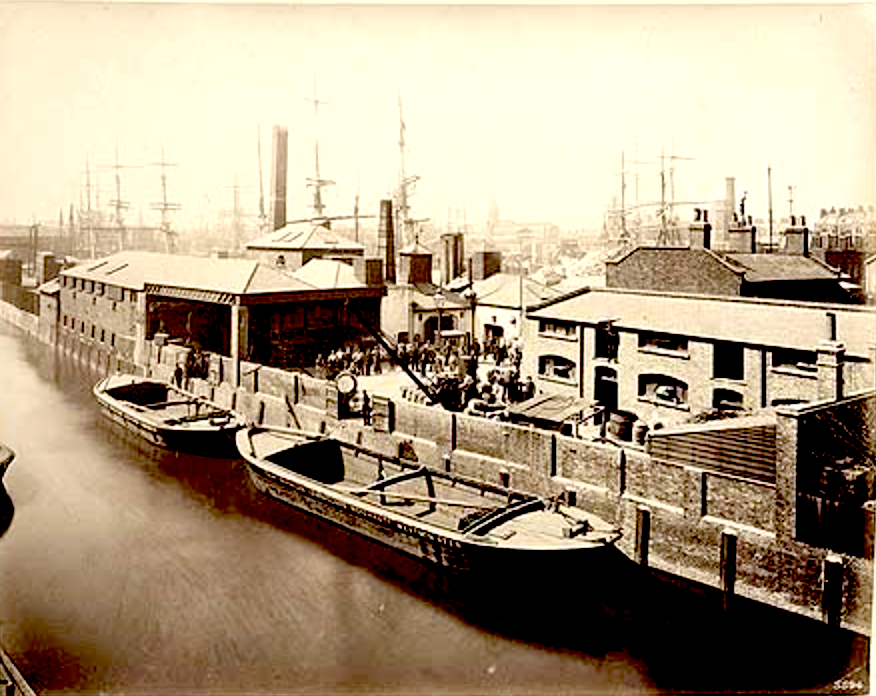
The Island Lead Mills, 1885, with their barges in the foreground

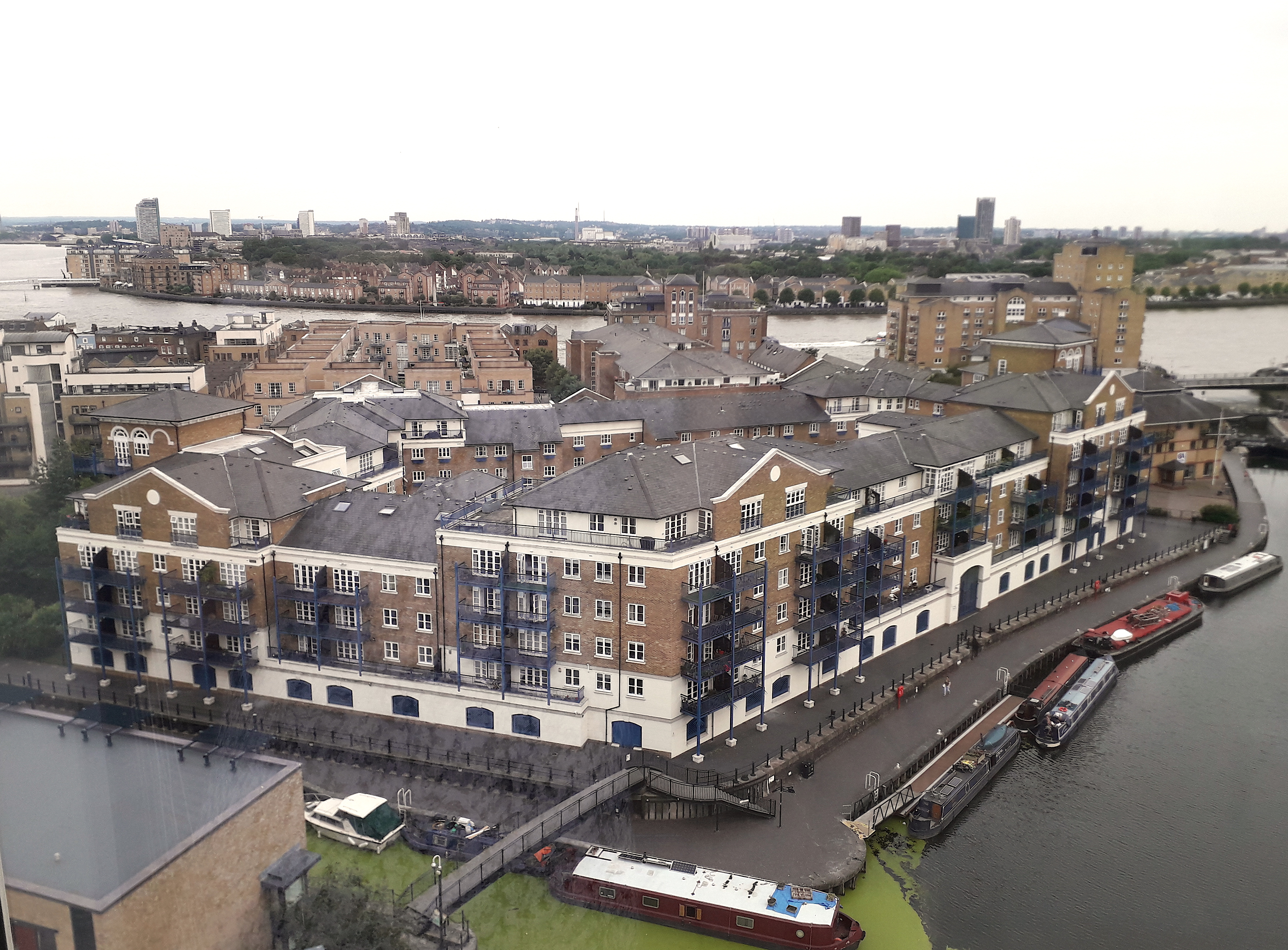
The site of the Island today. Victory Place, Limehouse

The sawmill fell into disuse before 1806, but by 1817 a lead mill was built on the island, called The Island Lead Mills. It continued a thriving business into the twentieth century—it had one of the first telephones in the East End of London—and its barges used the Cut; the company ceased to exist only in 1982.

By about 1868, however, the expanding Regent's Canal Dock had encroached so that the Island was no longer strictly such, and further portions were filled in later in the nineteenth century. Even so, traces can still be discerned adjacent Victory Place, Limehouse, which is built on the site.

=== Boatbuilding alongside Limehouse Cut ===
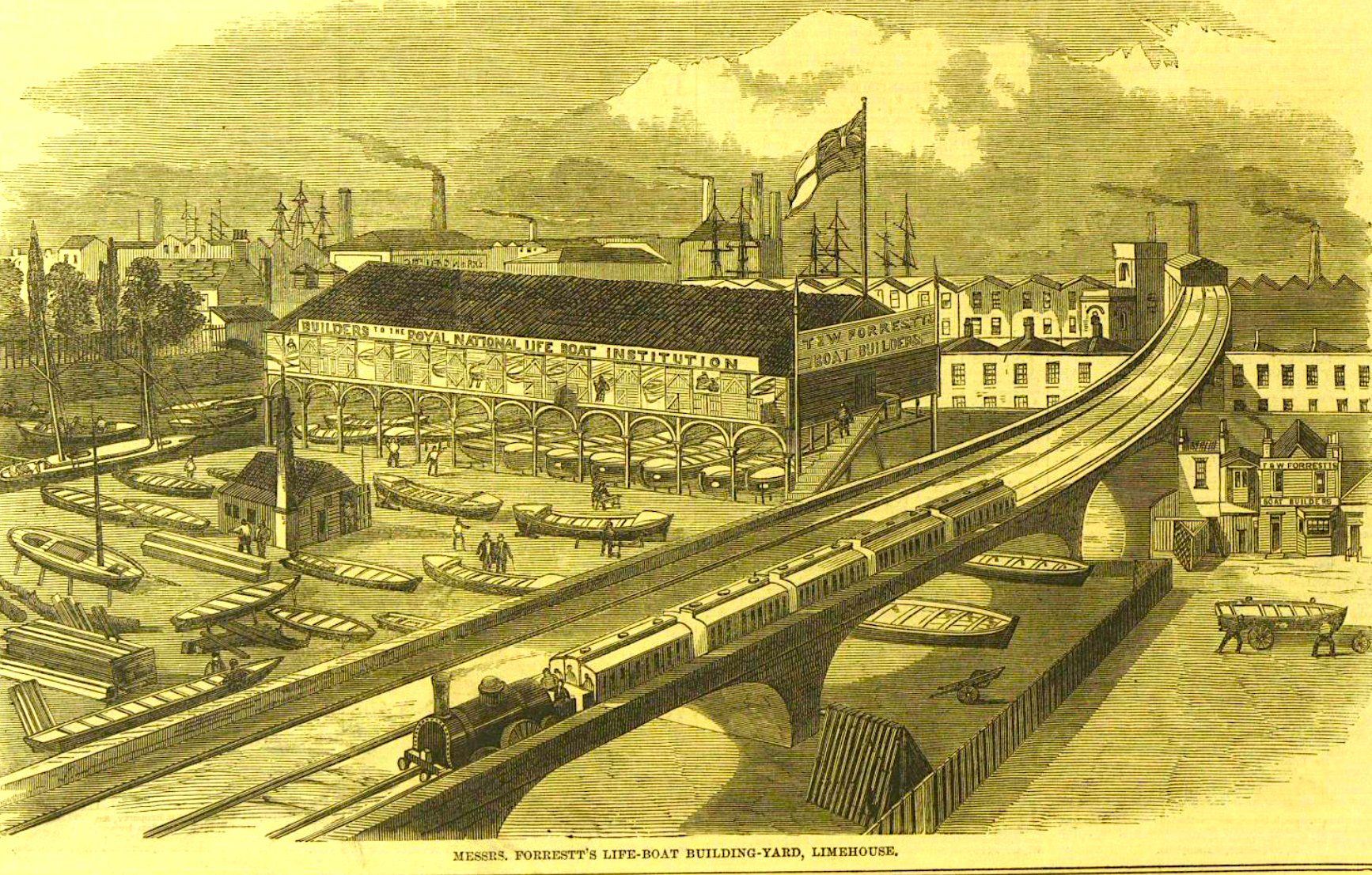
Forrestt's Boatyard. Most of the Victorian era's lifeboats were built here.

At Limehouse, across the Cut from the Island, was the boatyard of T & W Forrestt, builders to the Royal National Lifeboat Institution. The firm built the Institution's self-righting lifeboat, which they publicised by testing in the waters of the adjoining Cut. Reportedly these boats saved upwards of 12,000 lives. Other notable builds included the Admiralty's fast anti-torpedo boats powered by the noiseless Willans engine, and the yawl Rob Roy (one of the first vessels used in solo adventuring). When it became urgent to send an expedition to the Sudan to rescue General Gordon the firm built and delivered, in less than a month, 100 boats to a special design for ascending the cataracts of the Nile.

Forrestt's yard was called Norway Yard, a name that survives in Norway Place. The image—an engraving in the Illustrated London News—shows the boatyard after its restoration from a disastrous 1858 fire. In the foreground is the London and Blackwall Railway with (in the distance) Stepney Station, now Limehouse DLR. The railway arches traverse Mill Place and Island Row. The Cut is visible at left centre. Across the Cut is the Island, with the Island Lead Mills (smoking chimney). The rigging in the background reveals shipping lying in the Thames (left) or in the Regent's Canal Dock (centre).

=== Stinkhouse Bridge ===
Bow Common Lane met the Cut at Stinkhouse Bridge, so called even in official documents. The name first appears in an 1819 map and in an 1826 magistrates' report listing the bridges of Middlesex.

It was a desolate area originally, recalled a local historian, so chemical manufacturers went there for the opportunity to pollute. Hence the stench and the name. A subsidiary cause was filth from the notorious Black Ditch—a medieval sewer, originating in Spitalfields and discharging its waste in Limekiln Dock. At this place an open ditch, it had been fed under the Cut by a syphon, but it overflowed in stormy weather. More than once Stinkhouse Bridge required the attention of Joseph Bazalgette himself. "The smell is so bad that sometimes we cannot sleep in our beds", complained an 1856 petition. The main cause of the stink, thought Bazalgette, was factories discharging effluent into the Cut.

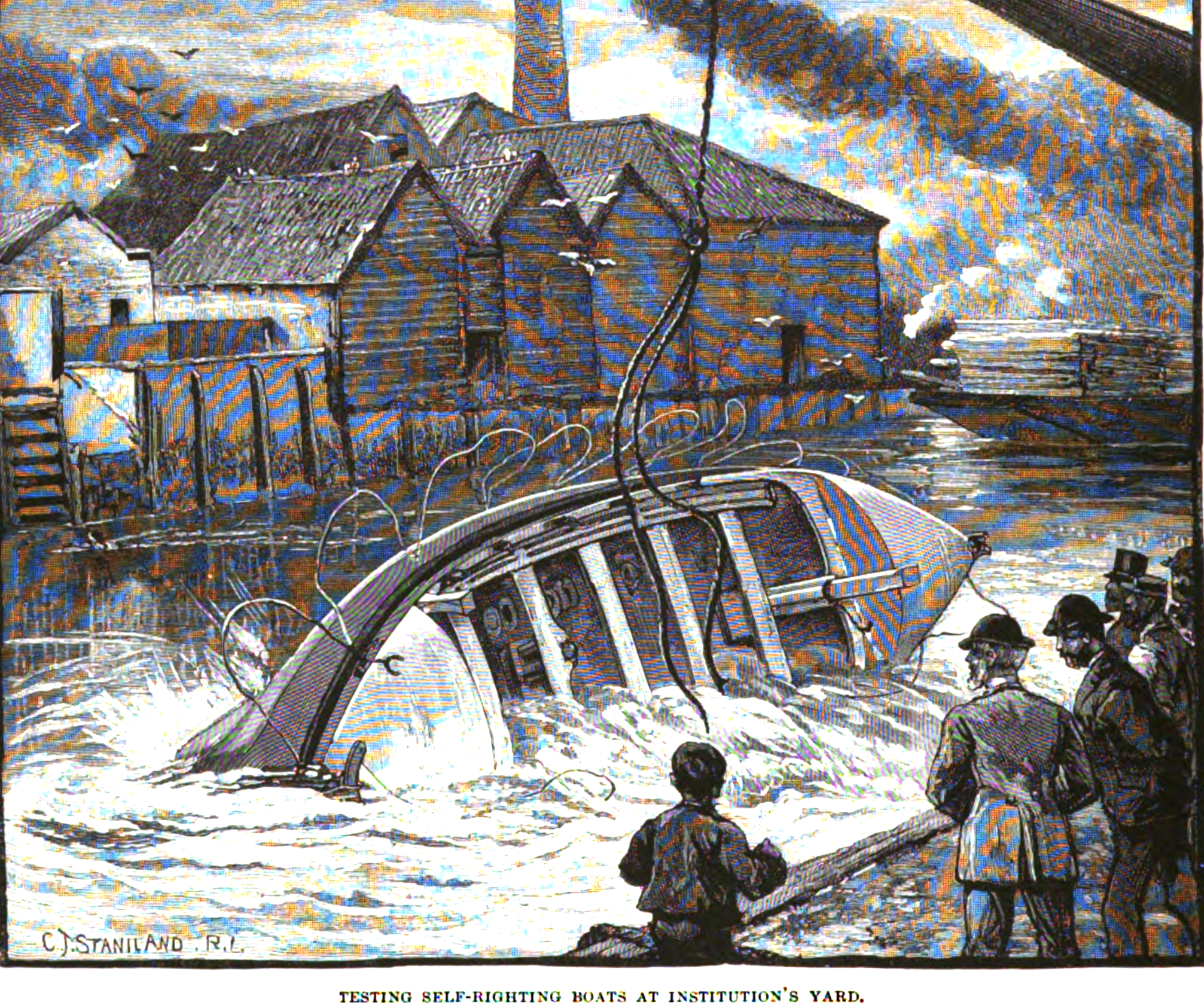
Near Stinkhouse Bridge, 1885. The RNLI's storeyard where lifeboats were tested before release to service

As time went by Stinkhouse Bridge became the nucleus of "the largest chemical and inflammable factories in London": the district was a fire risk. In 1866 it caught fire at last. So tremendous was the blaze that, reportedly, every unit in the London Fire Brigade knew to turn out—and where to go—just by "the great light in the sky". Many people jumped into the Cut to avoid being burned to death.

==== The Lifeboat Hospital ====
About 200 yards up the Cut, at Broomfield Street, was the RNLI's storeyard. Lifeboats were kept there prior to release to service. Before that, they were sunk in the waters of the Cut to test their self-righting powers, as shown. The tests also required men to stand on a gunwale until it was submerged. (Across the Cut began the notorious Fenian Barracks slum area, see below.) By 1926 a small fleet was kept on standby and a lifeboat could be rushed to any part of the British coast where coverage had failed. The site was known as the Lifeboat Hospital because damaged boats were returned there for repair.

==== Suicides ====
There are many reports of individuals trying to end their lives by jumping off Stinkhouse Bridge. In 1909 Coroner Wynne Baxter remarked that he had held inquests on over 50 suicides there. In a derisory attempt to enhance its image it was renamed Lavender Bridge. So dirty was the water that when a local labourer dived in to save a woman trying to drown herself, the magistrate awarded him special compensation from the poor box.

The bridge was rebuilt in 1929. It continued to be a well known East End placename even after the stink had gone. In Call the Midwife: A True Story of the East End in the 1950s the runaway Irish girl Mary lingers at Stinkhouse Bridge. "It was pleasant standing by the bridge, looking down at the moving water."

=== Bathing ===
In 1833 the Limehouse Cut was the place most frequented for bathing, an East London magistrate told Parliament. The authorities tried to ban the practice for indecency.

=== Pollution. The cholera and smallpox controversies. ===
==== The Cut becomes an open sewer ====
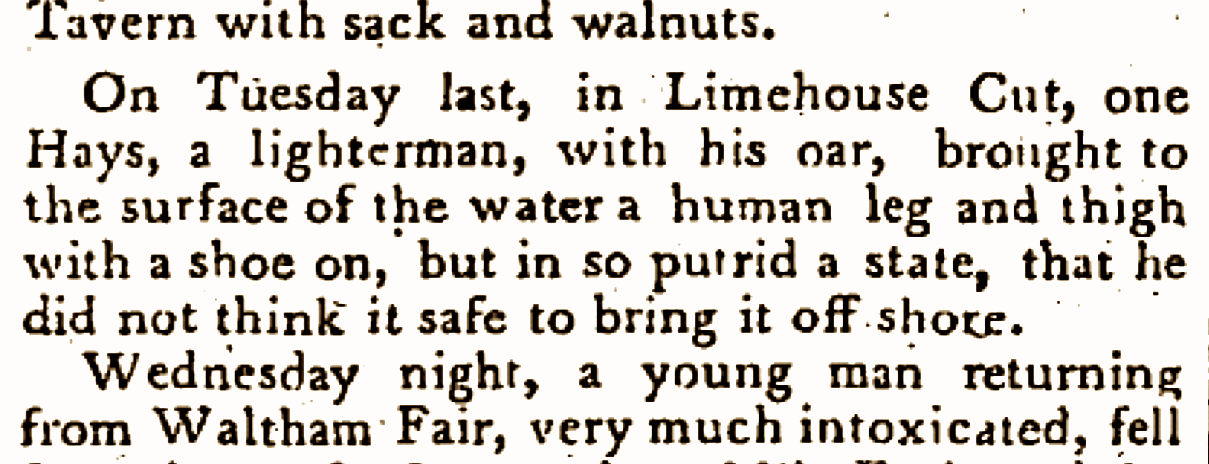
A gruesome find. (Oracle, 1798)

Until about 1815 it was illegal to discharge human waste except into cesspools; "sewers" originally were for rainwater. Then the practice gradually changed and in 1846 it became compulsory to drain houses into sewers. Sewers had always discharged into the Thames, and so Limehouse Cut itself became another sewer — in the modern sense — and, when population and industries crowded around its banks, a "very filthy" one.

William Farr wrote that in 1849 some houses near the Lea had no drinking-water supply, so the poor were forced to dip their pails in the Limehouse Cut. Apart from the chemical waste, he said, "the canal is a receptacle for dead dogs, cats, and other small animals, frequently seen floating on the discoloured waters; and on every occasion of opening the locks at Bromley there is a rush of floating scum into the Lea'. Amongst those who drank the water, deaths by cholera were observed.

As population increased the Lee itself became polluted with sewage, as did the Thames: the sewage was brought in by the tides and locked in the Cut, where it accumulated. In 1866 the Lee Navigation's engineer agreed that in hot dry weather the Cut was "An open continuous cesspit ... As foul as it could be.". In 1877 it was complained the layer of sediment was several feet thick.

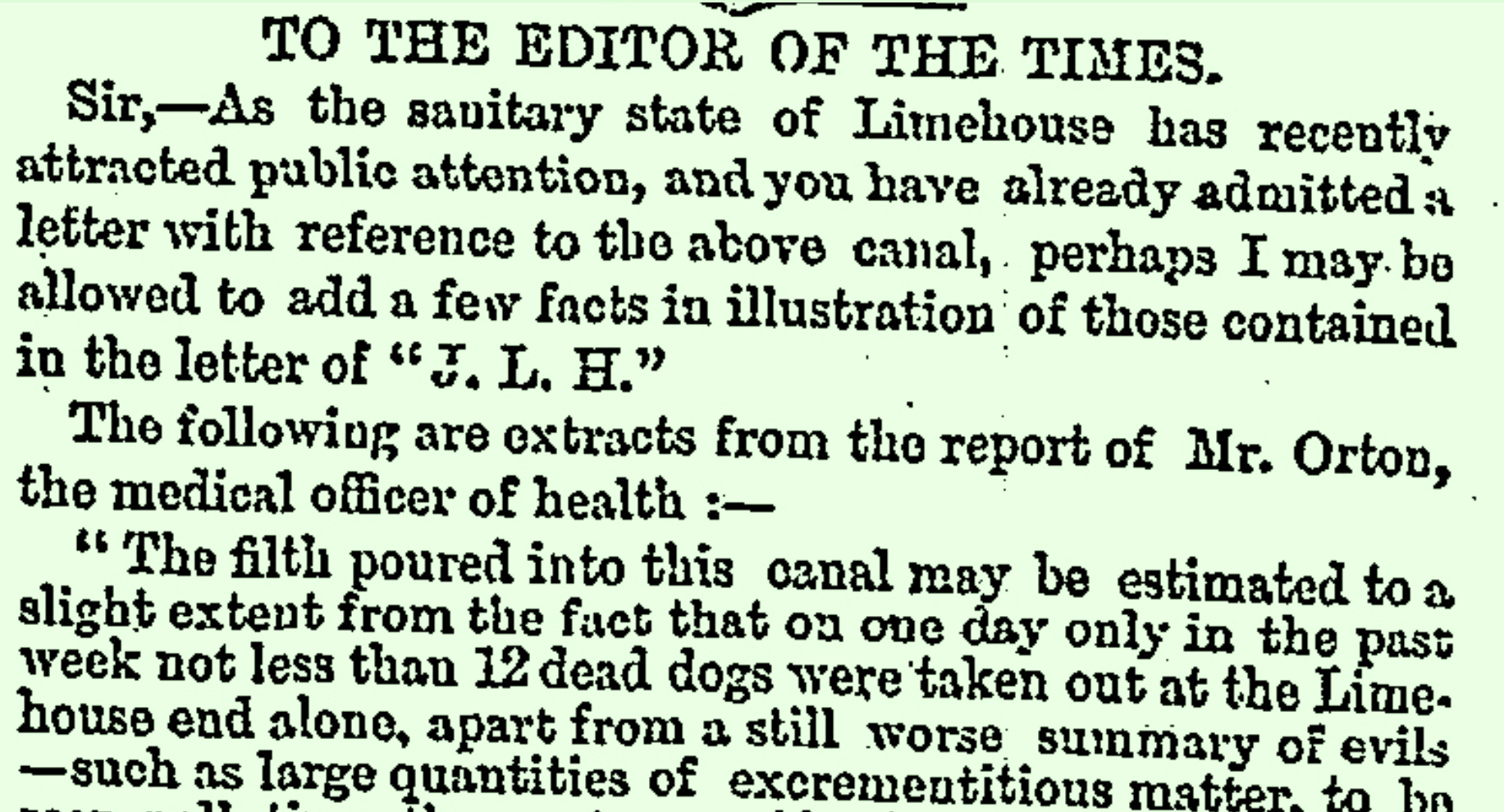
Letter from "A Sufferer", 1865. Agitation gradually led to its cleanup.

==== Cholera epidemic ====
In 1866, there was a major cholera epidemic in East London. Conventional medicine (the miasma theory) blamed polluted air, so there was an outcry against the Limehouse Cut. However, The Lancet appointed a sanitary commission who plotted the cases on a large map and discovered that living near (or far from) the canal had nothing to do with the risk of dying of the disease. They were led to reject the miasma explanation and to suspect the drinking-water. It was afterwards proved that faecally contaminated water had got into the East London Waterworks Company's supply and been pumped to households — a step in medical science towards rejecting the miasma theory and establishing the currently accepted germ theory of disease.

But Thomas Orton, the Limehouse medical officer of health, was not a convert. In his district, he said, "water-drinkers" (teetotallers) scarcely ever got the cholera: it must be the bad air from the canals.

==== The smallpox hospital ====
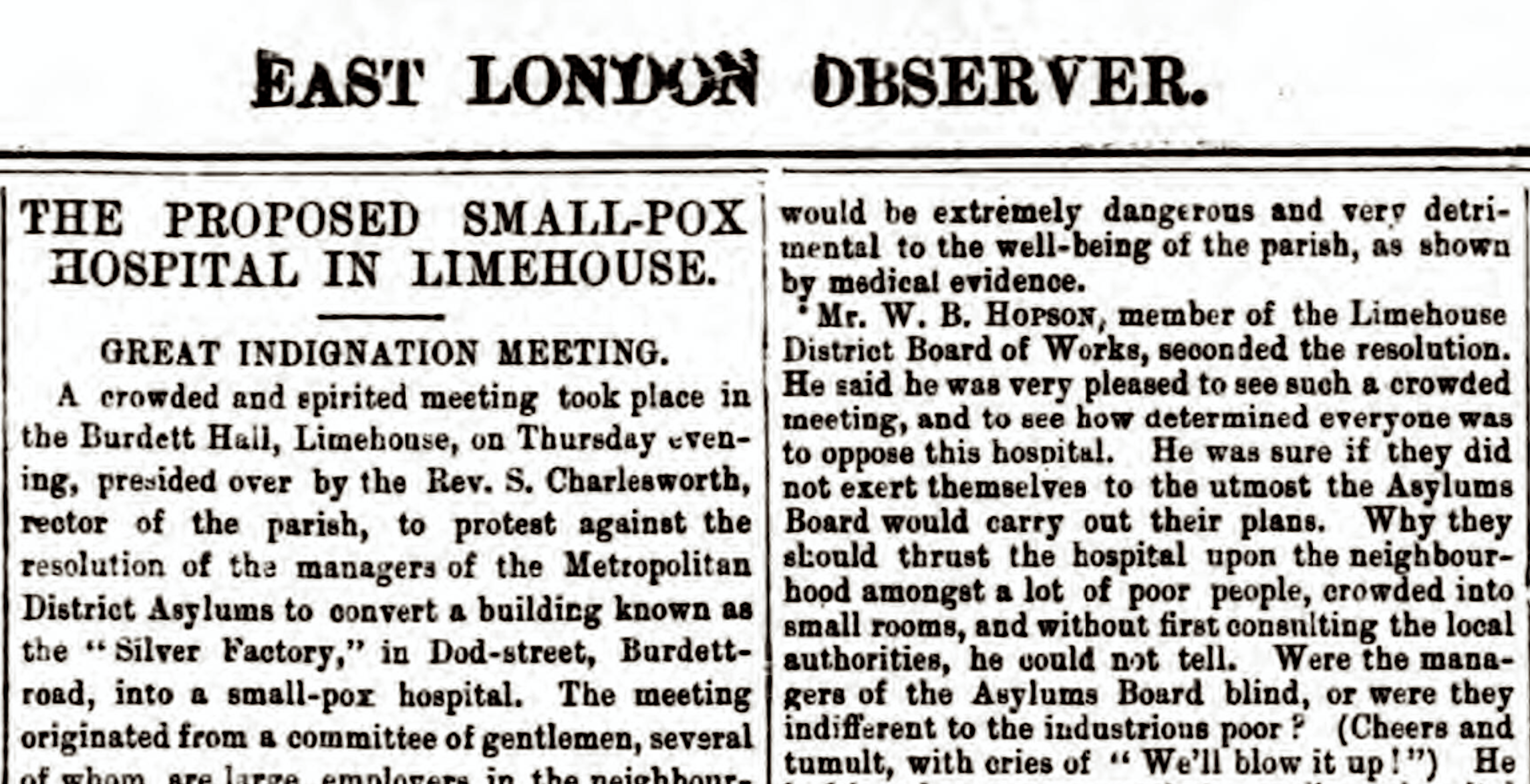
"Blow it up!". Smallpox hospital beside the Cut infuriates East Enders.

In 1876, there was a smallpox outbreak in London and the authorities struggled to find suitable hospital accommodation. Some patients were placed in a hospital in Hampstead but this attracted the ire of local residents; one of them, Sir Rowland Hill, sued. The authorities then rented the disused Silver factory - sandwiched between the Limehouse Cut and Dod Street - and made plans to convert it into a hospital. It infuriated East Enders that West End bureaucrats should send smallpox patients to a crowded working district in Limehouse ("Another opportunity for the West to look down on and revile the denizens of the East" sneered the East London Observer) and there were demonstrations in Trafalgar Square and threats of violence.

Samuel Charlesworth, Rector of St Anne's Limehouse, wrote that it was a very bad place for patients anyway. Highly insalubrious, it had no ventilation "to move the fog often settling there, except the current of offensive vapour moving up and down the fœtid canal." He, the Rev. Charleswoth, knew the Cut was unhealthy because he lived next to it himself; his children "when at home always fail in health". Opposite, six children of one family had died in one month — of some blood infection. Their coffins had been superposed in the same grave.

==== Cleanup ====
But the cleanup of Limehouse Cut was already underway. It worked for two reasons: Bazalgette's strategic system of intercepting sewers; and an act of Parliament, the Rivers Pollution Prevention Act 1876 (39 & 40 Vict. c. 75), which gave the Lee Conservancy Board powers to pursue polluters — for this purpose the Limehouse Cut was deemed to be part of the Lee — and to dredge sewage. In the Cut, already by 1877 the board had closed down 36 private sewers. By the end of the century its dredgers were removing 40 tons of sediment a day.

=== Burdett Road Bridge ===
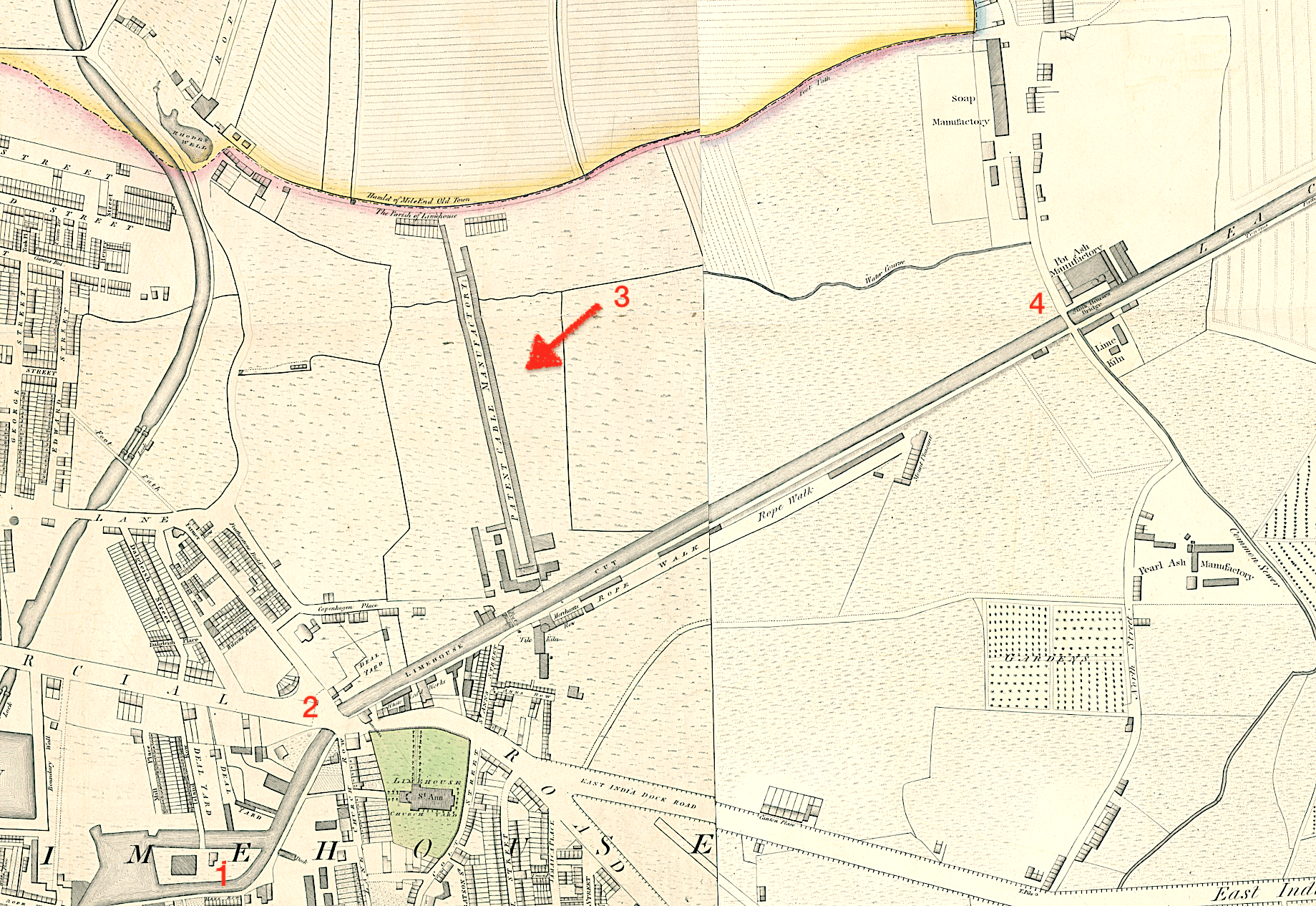
The Cut in 1819. 1 The Island. 2 Britannia Bridge. 3 Huddart's Patent Cable Works (afterwards the Burdett Road). 4 Stinkhouse Bridge.

In 1819, the Cut ran through open countryside from Bromley lock to Britannia Bridge, Commercial Road. There was no way of crossing this except at Stinkhouse Bridge. To the northwest, see map, was the Patent Cable Works, a long ropewalk founded by Captain Joseph Huddart where was made his twice-as-strong ship's cable. In due course the area was built up, the Cable Works closed and in 1858 its line was used to construct the "Victoria Park Approach Road" — soon renamed Burdett Road after philanthropist Angela Burdett-Coutts. A new bridge had to be made over the Cut. For the sake of the barge traffic Parliament required the bridge to allow headroom of at least "Eight Feet above High Water Mark, Trinity Standard".

=== Dod Street and socialist politics ===
Dod Street, on the corner by Burdett Road Bridge and whose factories overlooked the Cut, was built and named by 1861. It first attracted public attention in the smallpox hospital controversy (above) and then as a site for Sunday political meetings. Socialists like John Burns, Amie Hicks, Henry Hyndman Eleanor Marx, William Morris and George Bernard Shaw, among others, were speakers there.

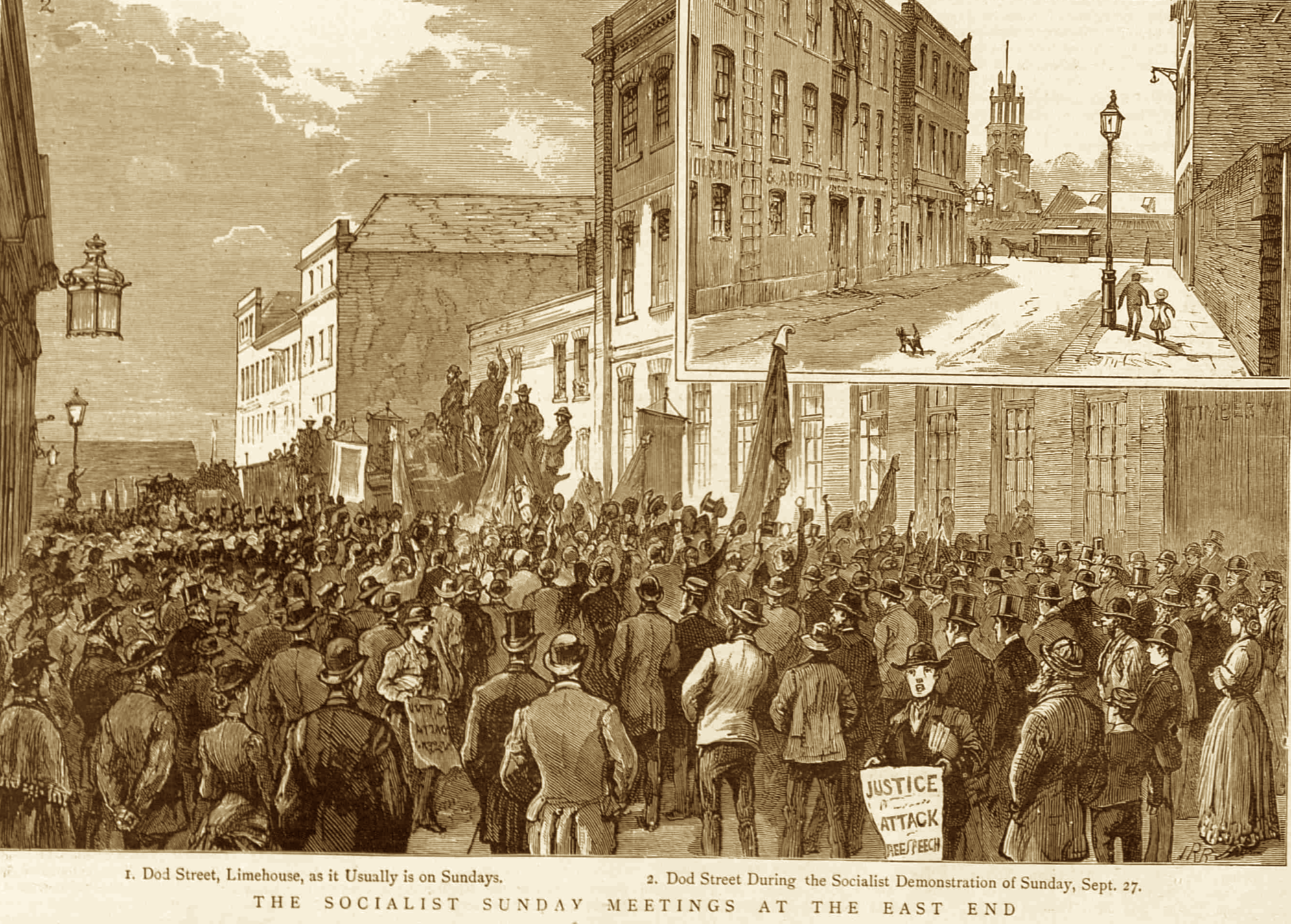
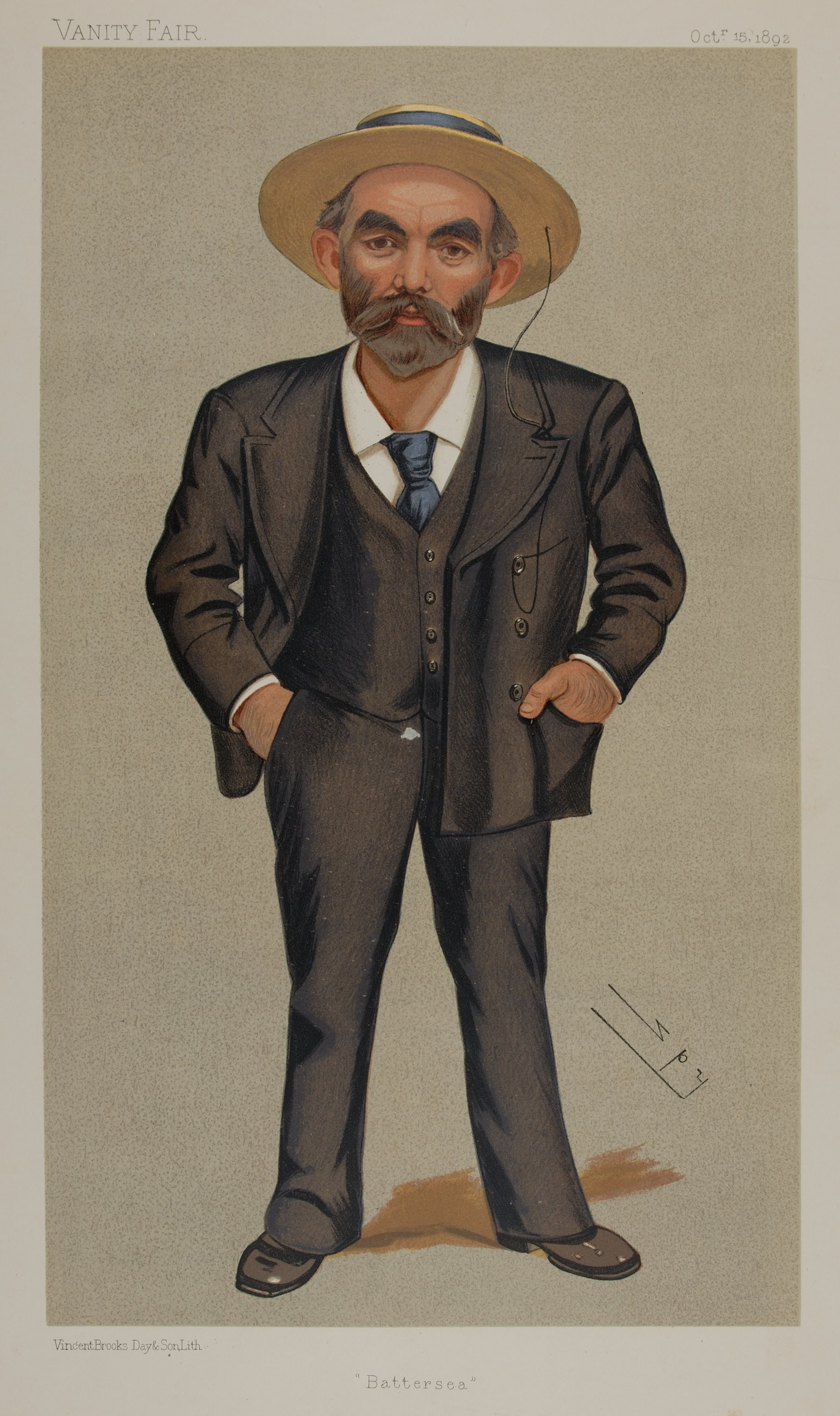
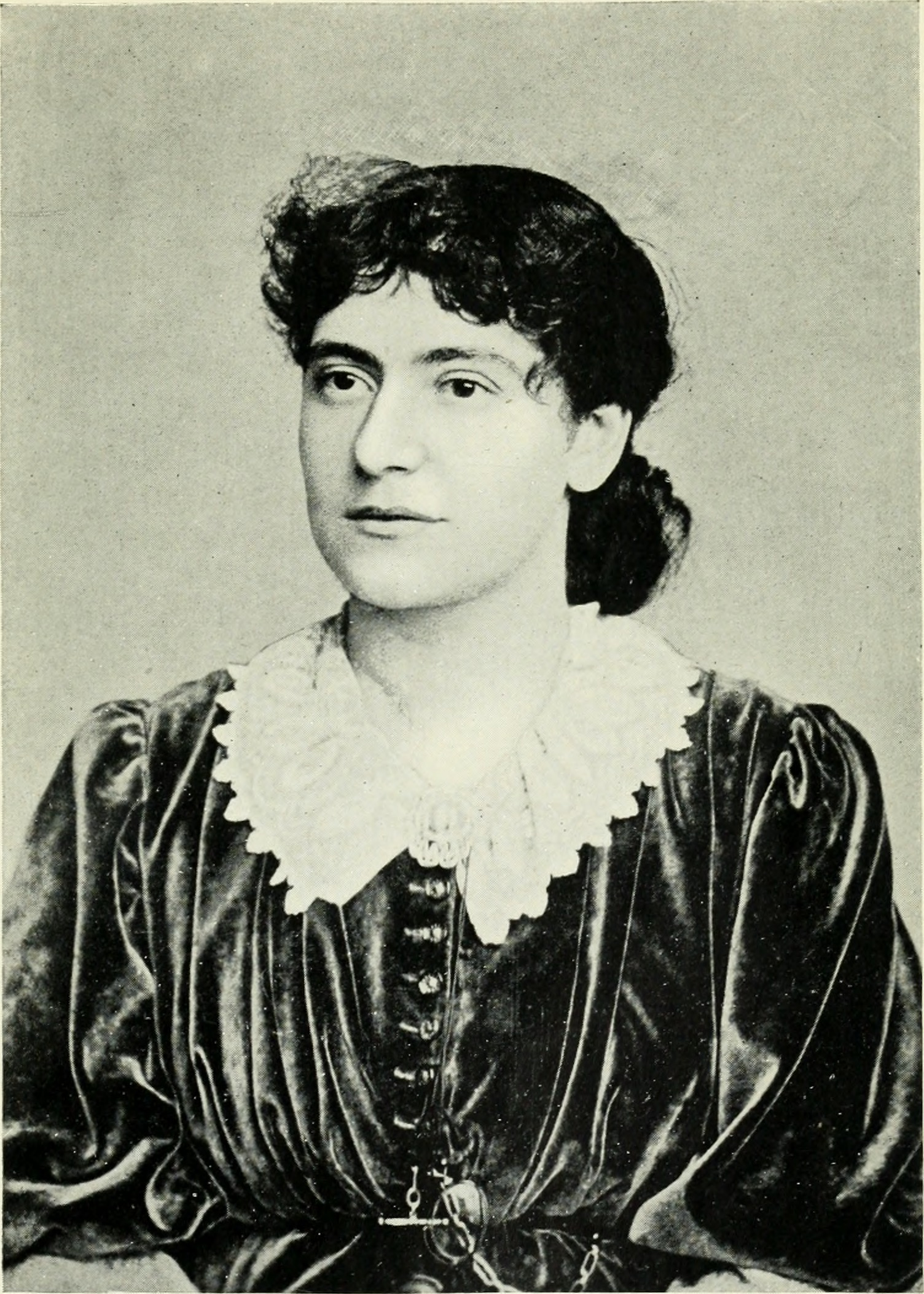
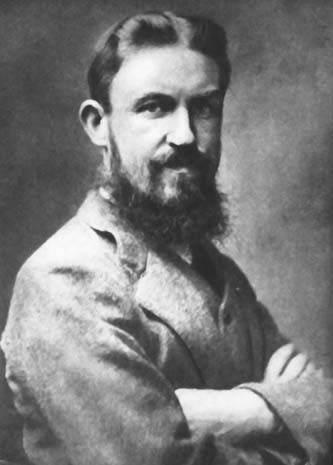
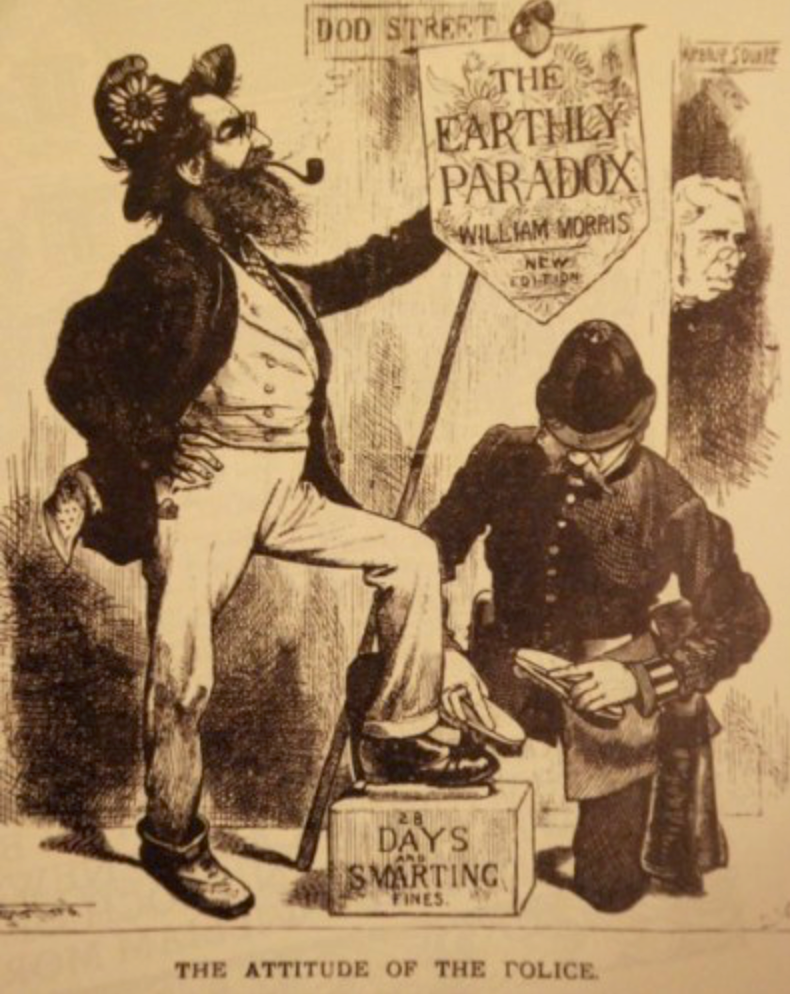
Socialist meetings at Dod Street. Speakers included (left to right) John Burns, Eleanor Marx, George Bernard Shaw and William Morris

Dod Street gave rise to the expression "the Dod Street trick" used in socialist politics. The police felt these meetings were subversive and sought to prevent them by arresting demonstrators for highway obstruction. Since there was no traffic to obstruct — it was a street of canal-side factories on a Sunday — the police were perceived as denying freedom of speech.

The Dod Street trick, devised to counter this, was thus described by Bernard Shaw:

Find a dozen... who are willing to get arrested at the rate of one a week by speaking in defiance of the police. In a month or two, the repeated arrests, the crowds which they attract, the scenes which they provoke, the sentences passed by the magistrates... and the consequent newspaper descriptions, rouse sufficient public feeling to force the Home Secretary to give way whenever the police are clearly in the wrong,

which is what happened. Public indignation gathered enormous crowds of people — only a very few of which were socialists — and they were let alone.

The political caricature (bottom right) mocks the genteel socialism of William Morris It refers to a trial in Arbour Square magistrates court in which plebeian demonstrators had been found guilty and punished, but Morris was only dismissed with a warning. It symbolically has the law blacking Morris' boots in Dod Street — his foot rests on comrades who did get jail time or "smarting" fines — while on his banner is an ironical reference to his high-flown poem The Earthly Paradise.

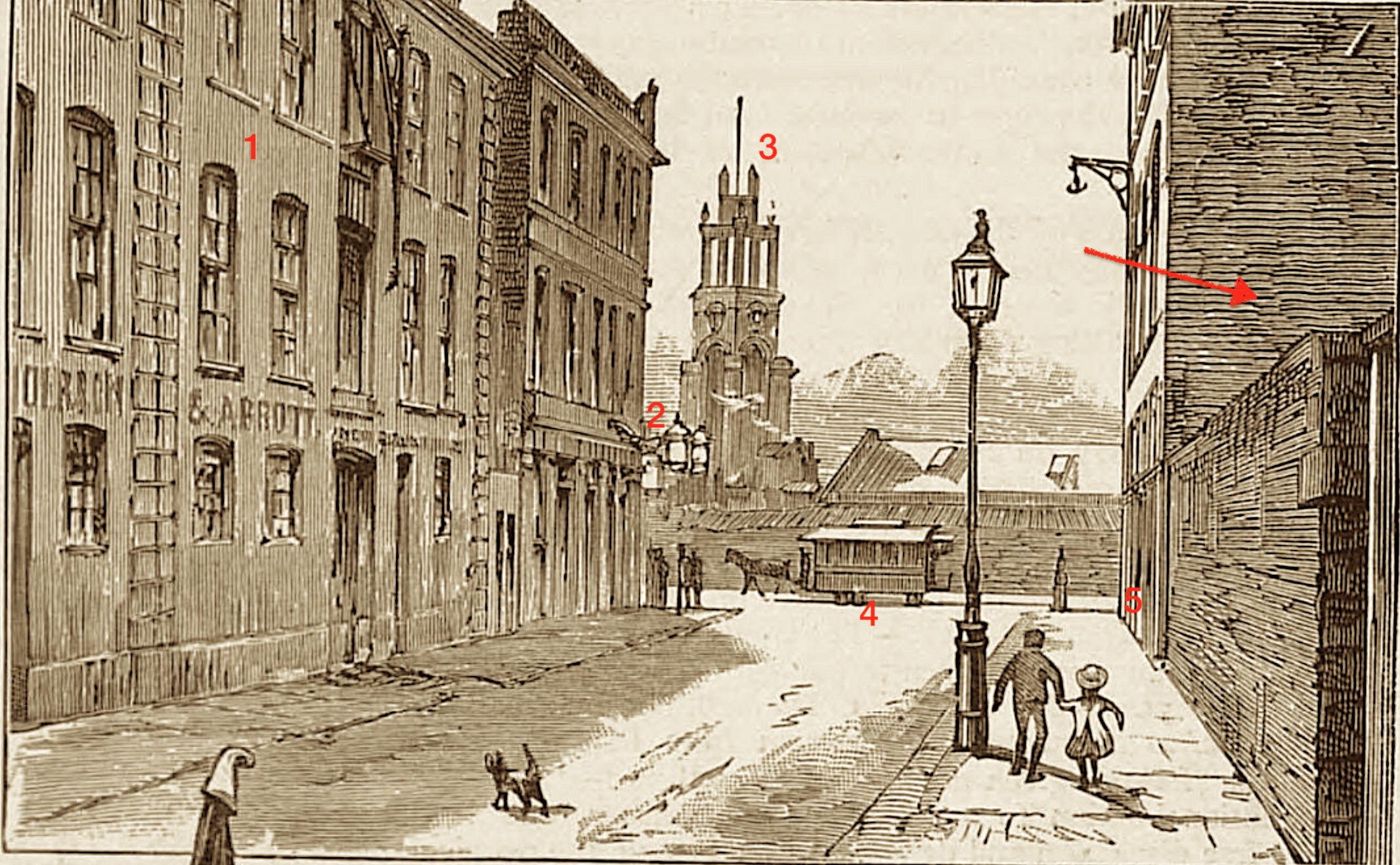
Dod Street sketched on Sunday 27 September 1885

The main cartoon contains an inset which, though incidentally, illustrates the area in late Victorian times. The detail is reproduced here. The arrow points towards Limehouse Cut.

In the left foreground 1 is the rubber factory of Abbott, Anderson & Abbott who made the capes for the Metropolitan Police and oilskins for the Royal Navy.

The last building 2 on the left — the one with the double lamps — is the "Silver Tavern" public house, informal headquarters of the East End Football Association, in which played such teams as Millwall Rovers, Tottenham Hotspur and the East End mission of Eton College.

In the distance 3 is St Anne's Limehouse, while at the bottom of the street can be seen the Burdett Road horse-drawn tramway — a tram 4 has just crossed the Bridge. Across Burdett Road begins the notorious St Anne Street Rookery, described below.

The last building on the right 5 is a warehouse soon to become the Outcasts' Haven (below).

=== Cutting edge industry ===
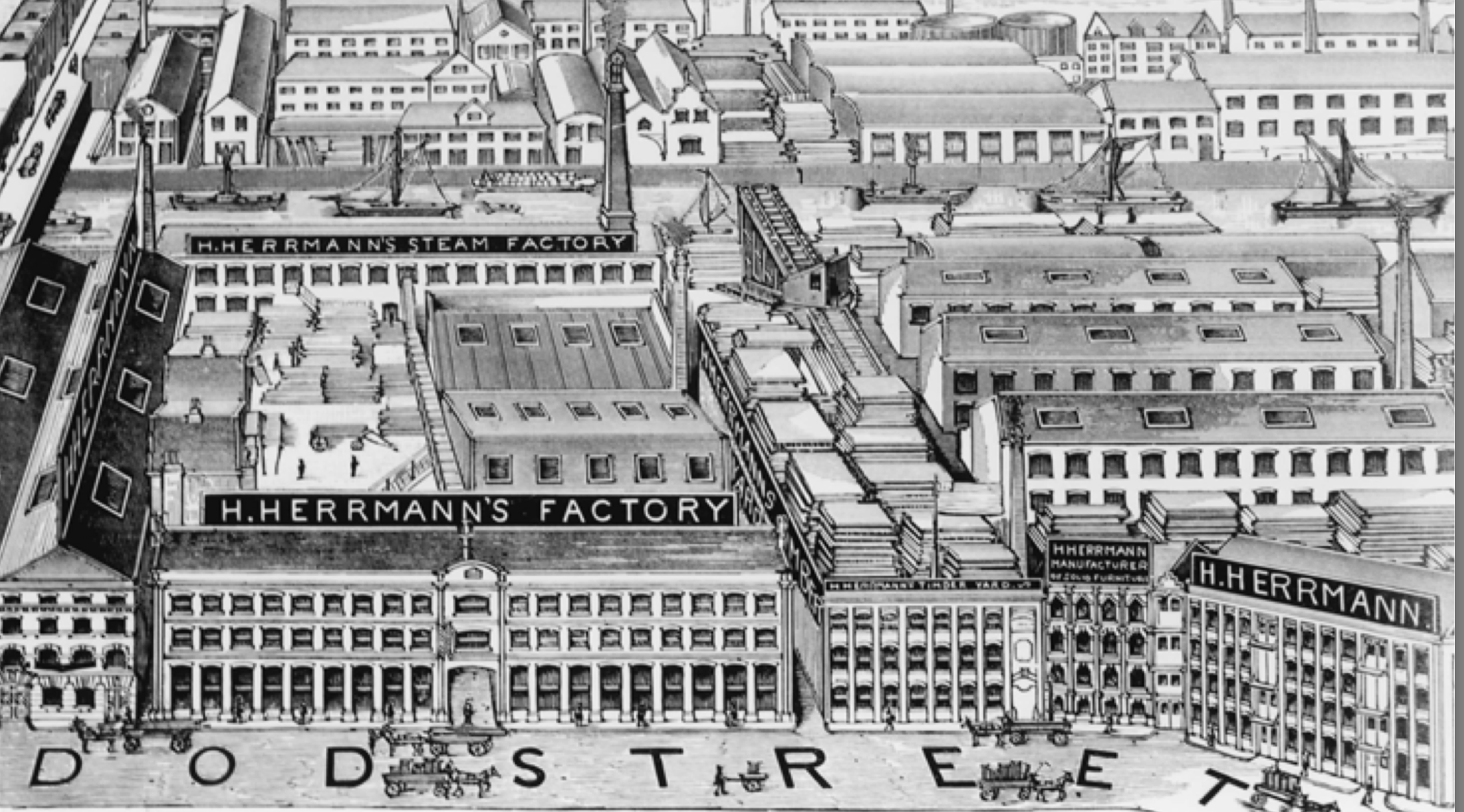
H Herrmann's furniture factory. Notice the electric travelling crane, highly innovative in 1888.

Taking up most of the north side of Dod Street and backing onto the Limehouse Cut was the innovative H. Herrmann factory. Opened in 1877 by American Henry Herrmann, it made hardwood furniture and was the first in England to do so almost entirely by machine. Its stock of timber — easily imported by water — was described in the East London Observer as "something enormous", yet swiftly turned into good furniture "at the lowest possible prices". Handled by a steam crane — risky in timber yards — the whole factory burned down in a colossal fire in 1887. (The fire got dangerously close to the East London Saltpetre Works, until extinguished by the Fire Brigade's floating engines on the Cut). Herrmann rebuilt the factory and introduced one of the world's first electric travelling cranes to save on the steep insurance premiums. As there was no electrical supply in London, he generated his own, and had the factory electrically lit.

At Herrmann's in 1884, while planning his London bombing campaign, worked Irish-American dynamitard Harry Burton; he lodged round the corner in Pelling Street.

The Fire Brigade continued to use floating fire engines on the Cut ("fire boats") until at least 1929.

=== The Outcasts' Haven ===
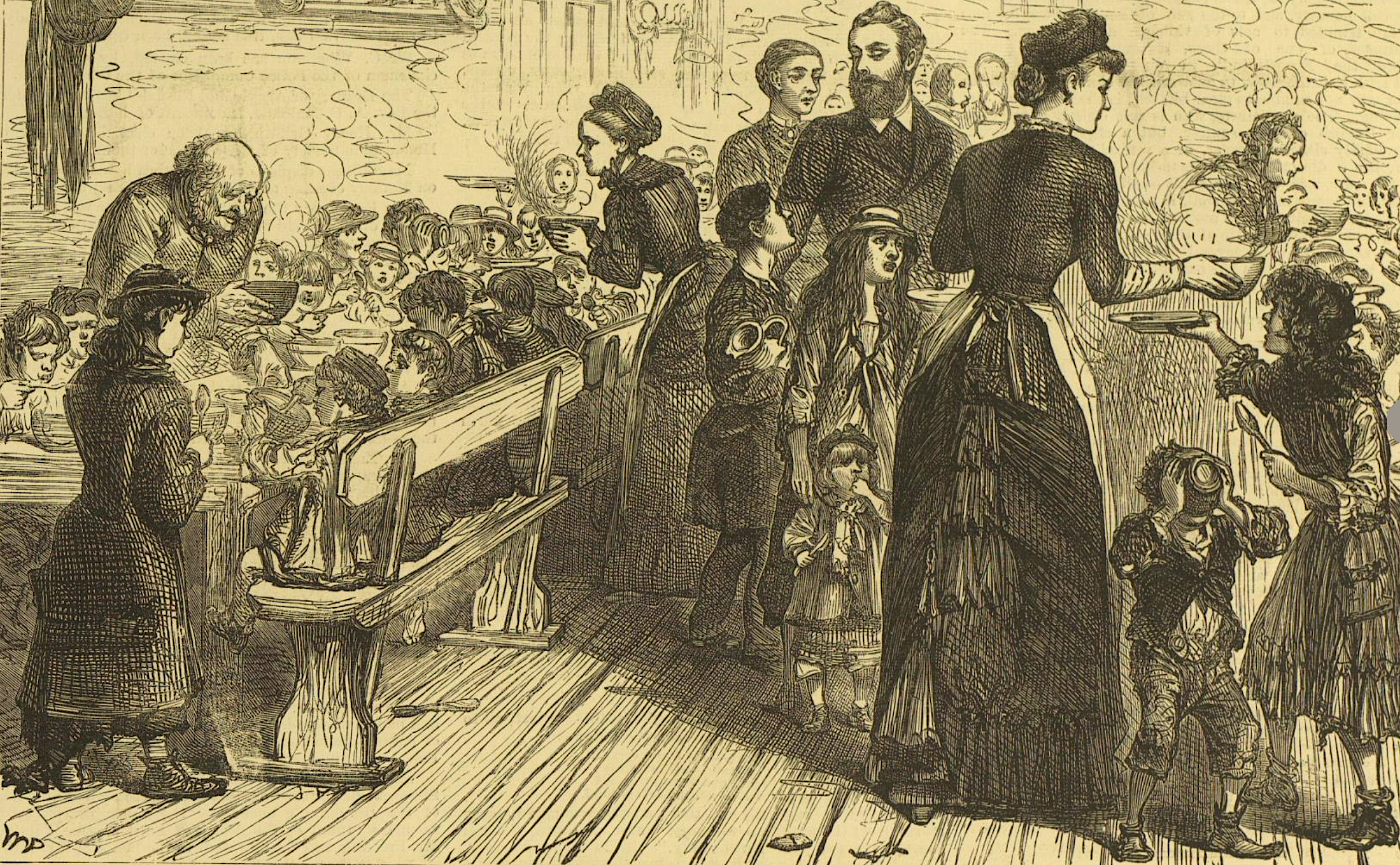
A charity stunt. Walter Austin and Frances Napton lived well off charity appeals, keeping no proper accounts.

In a disused warehouse at 1A Dod Street, opposite the Silver Tavern, was the Outcasts' Haven. According to Charles Dickens Jr., the first rule of the establishment was this:

Any outcast boy or girl, up to the age of sixteen, without parents, guardians or friends, and who has no home but the streets, will be admitted at once, at any hour of the day or the night free, and be provided with a bath, warm clothes, food and a bed.

Any policeman on the beat "who finds some poor outcast shrinking from the flash of his lantern", wrote Dickens, knew to send the child to Dod Street.

But, according to an exposé in the investigative journal Truth, it was part of a charity scam. Run by a man called Walter Austin and his mistress Frances Napton ("the Lady Superintendent"), the charity put on stunts (see illustration), sent out heart-rending appeals, collected large donations, but kept no proper accounts. While it did spend some money on homeless children, its proprietor lived well.

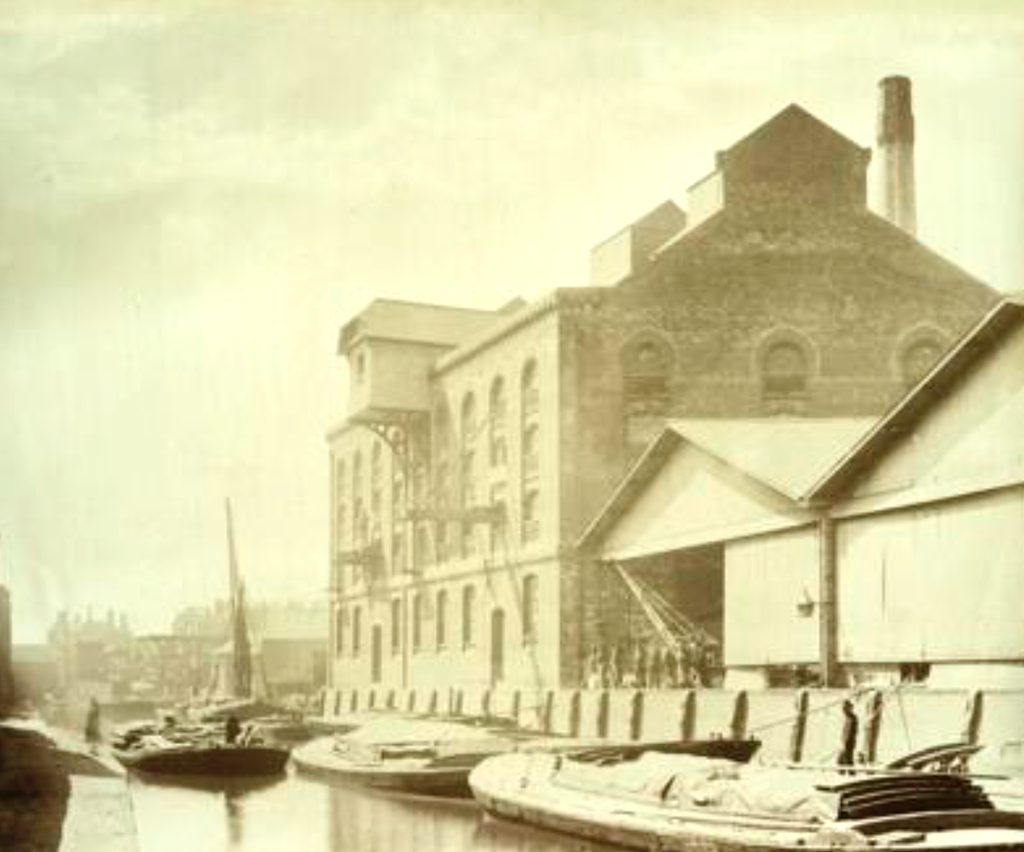
Limehouse Cut, 1886, near Copenhagen Place, with the Copenhagen Oil Mills (centre)

=== Victorian recycling ===
East End refuse collectors — called "dustmen", because households produced much coal ash — took the product to two yards on the Limehouse Cut, where it was hand-sorted into separate hills by gangs of old men, women and boys. The ash and breeze was sent by barge to Kent, where it was made into bricks; the rags, bones and metal were sold to "marine-store dealers"; the old tin was sold to trunk-makers; the old bricks and oyster shells were sold to builders and road-makers; the old boots were sold to Prussian blue manufacturers; the money and jewellery were kept.

The Copenhagen Wharf recycling facility can just be discerned in the 1886 photograph (left background). The scene is a few yards west of Burdett Road bridge. In the centre is Hirsch's Copenhagen Oil Mills, where seeds were crushed to make oil. Dumb barges are moored in the foreground. To the right is the Victoria Lead Works.

=== Rookeries ===
A rookery was a slum area whose inhabitants aggressively and cooperatively opposed law enforcement.

==== St Anne's Street Rookery ====
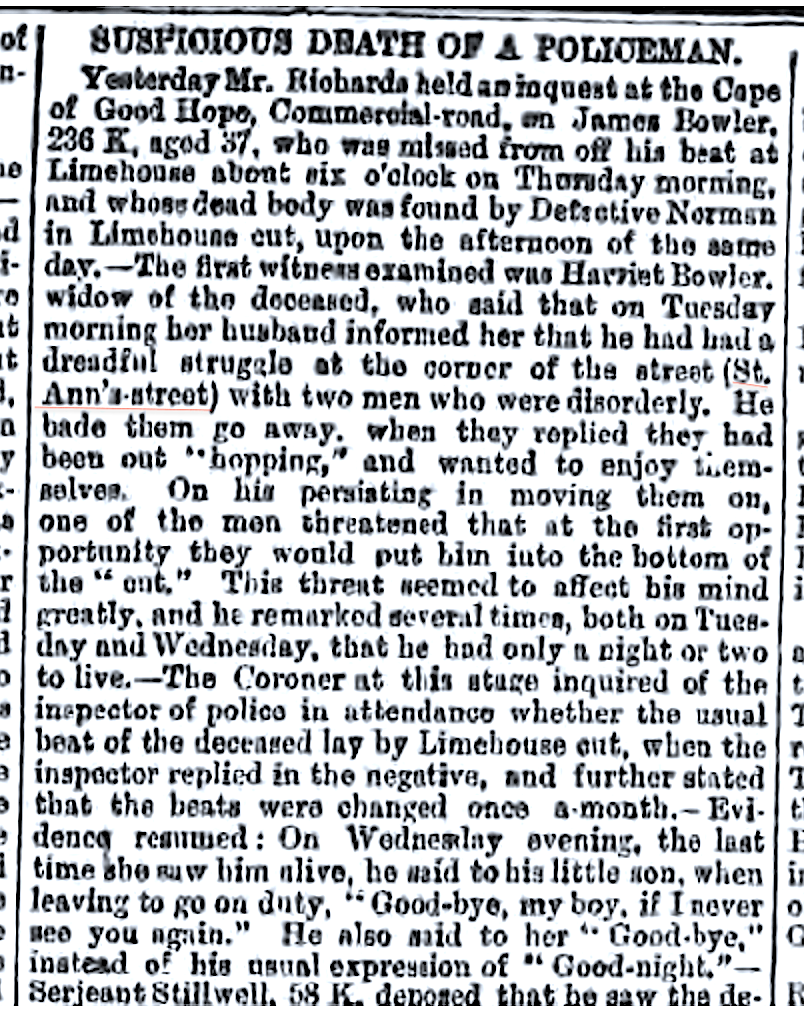
In St Anne's Rookery. Lloyds Weekly Newspaper, 5 October 1872.

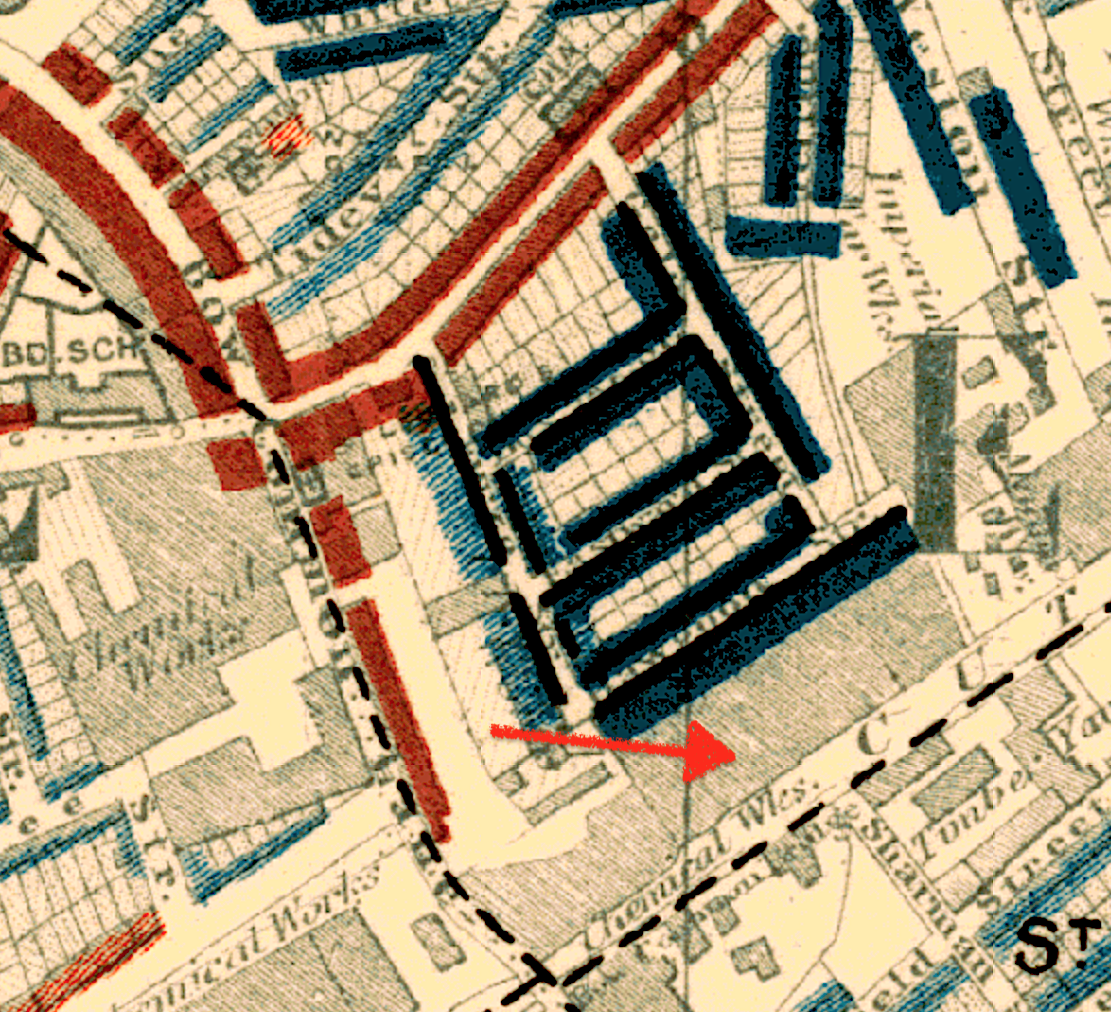
The Fenian Barracks (black): the most dangerous rookery in London. The fat refinery (arrow) attracted the even more terrifying canalside rat hordes.

Across Burdett Road was St Anne's Rookery, "a vile quarter lying between Limehouse Church and Limehouse-cut". Marked black on Charles Booth's poverty maps — the colour coding denoted "Lowest class. Vicious, semi-criminal" — it was one of the few slums alongside the Cut; usually, the land was too valuable for housing.

This notorious enclave, into which a policeman might be dragged by a mob, continually featured in newspaper reports. It included St Anne Street, where a man starved his wife in "peculiarly horrible" circumstances (1872); and Merchant's Row, where a labourer kicked his mother to death (1897). Law enforcement could be dangerous.

==== The Fenian Barracks ====
Even more dangerous to police was the district near Stinkhouse Bridge bounded by Limehouse Cut to the south and centred on Furze Street. Charles Booth's police informants called it the Fenian Barracks, which "sent more police to hospital than any other block in London and in which only Irish were tolerated to settle".

George H. Duckworth, one of Booth's researchers, wrote that the Barracks was about the worst district in London — "three policemen wounded there last week". According to his informant Inspector Carter, if they attempted an arrest "a rescue is always organized. They fling brick bats, iron, any thing they can lay their hands on." As was typical for rookeries, adjoining houses had internal passages designed for eluding police pursuit.

Summarised Duckworth:

Men travel from house to house from within if chased. A cry of police brings help from every house. The inhabitants hustle the police, they organize rescues; not the least bit of good [using] anything less than 6 constables ... if there is any prospect of having to haul off anyone to the police station.

In contrast, rent collectors went about the district in broad daylight wearing top hats and black coats and carrying umbrellas. A fat refinery alongside the canal attracted visitors who, said Inspector Carter, were more terrifying than the human inhabitants:

You should come down here on an early summer morning; if possible after a shower of rain; Rats, not in twos or threes or in 10s or twentys, but in thousands and tens of thousands: the street will be covered with them, so will be the yard of the factory: rats, not small rats but big & fat, the size of cats : you knock a flagstone with your boot and away they go with a rush and a hissing sound from their feet upon the pavements that will make your blood run cold.

The East End was surveyed again in 1929 by researchers from the London School of Economics who found that, though poor areas in East London were much less widespread than in Charles Booth's time, the Fenian Barracks area was still an ugly pocket of chronic poverty.

=== Caird & Rayner ===
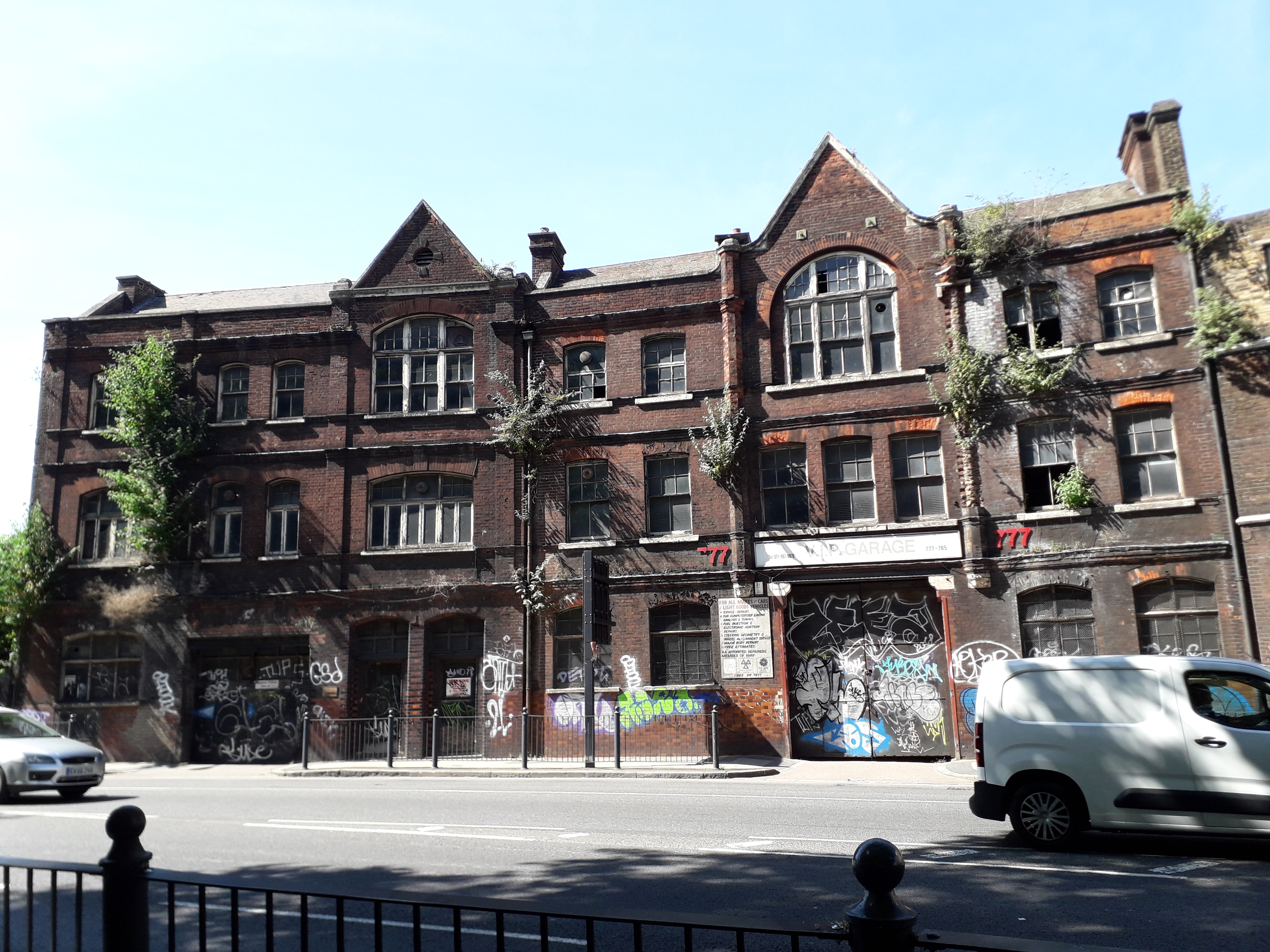
The innovative Caird & Rayner works, latterly the VIP Garage, derelict in this 2019 photo

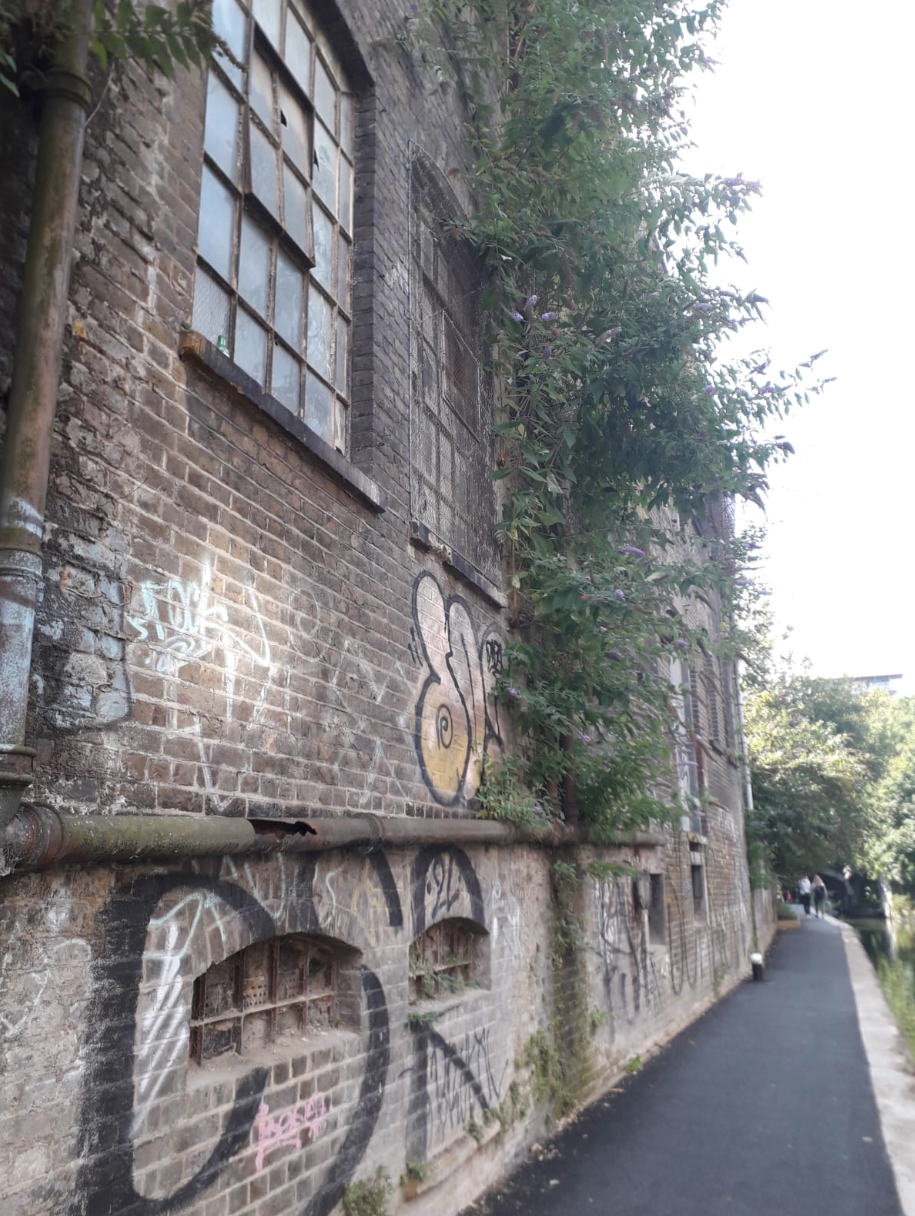
Canal towpath side

At 777 Commercial Road, opposite St Anne's Limehouse Church, and backing onto the Limehouse Cut, stands a building bearing the sign V.I.P. Garage. Originally (1869) a ships chandler's, it is the best surviving example of a sail loft in Docklands; later it was extended to the east and formed the workshop and offices of Caird & Rayner. This firm specialised in desalination apparatus, crucial for maintaining ship's boilers — and drinking water — on long sea voyages. Patented in 1888, their apparatus was fitted on dreadnoughts, British and Japanese battleships, Cunard liners, and "the Czar's new yacht". A specimen is in the Science Museum. Water from the Cut was used for testing the equipment. The firm moved in 1972.

In 2000 the building was listed, both for its historical and architectural interest. The engineering workshop is a very early example of fully steel structural framework, probably the only surviving one in London.

=== National politics ===
On 25 January 1981 the Gang of Four stood on the bridge over former Limehouse Lock and issued the Limehouse Declaration.

=== Other names ===
Limehouse Cut has been known by other or alternative names:

NAME(S)	SOURCE	DATE
"River Lea" (even where entering Thames at Limehouse)	John Cary's New and Accurate Plan of London and Westminster	1795
"Limehouse Cut or Bromley Canal"	John Fairburn's Map of London and Westminster	1802
"Poplar Cut" (not to be confused with Poplar Gut)	Edward Mogg's London in Miniature	1809
"Lea Cut" (in Bromley); "Limehouse Cut" (in Limehouse)	G. F. Cruchley's New Plan of London	1827
"Bromley Canal or Lea Cut"	Kelly's Post Office Directory Map	1857
"Lea Cut" (east of Bow Common Lane); "Limehouse Cut" (to west)	Cross's New Plan of London	1861

== Today ==
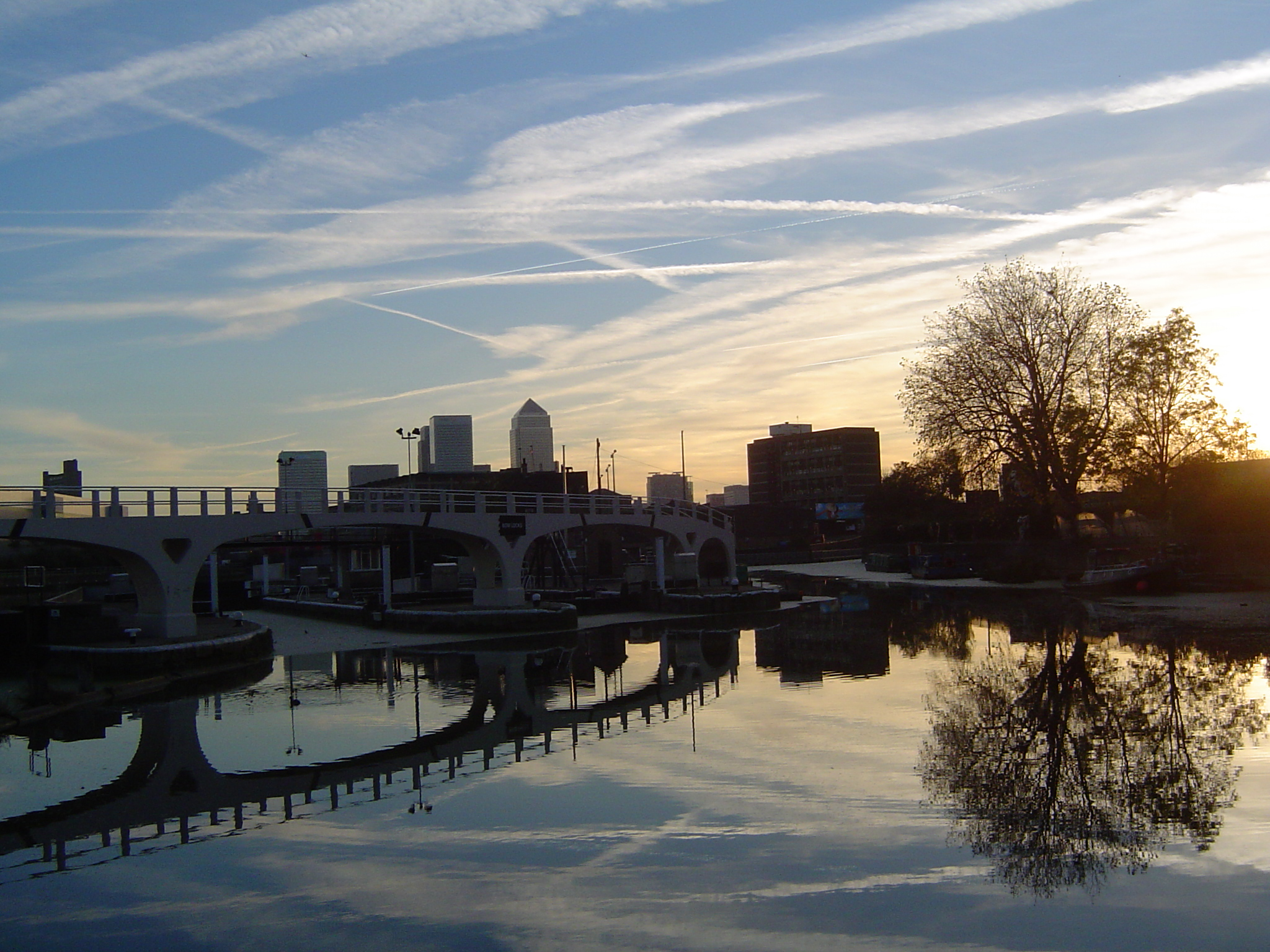
Choice: to the left, Bow Locks and to Leamouth; to the right, the Cut and to Limehouse Basin

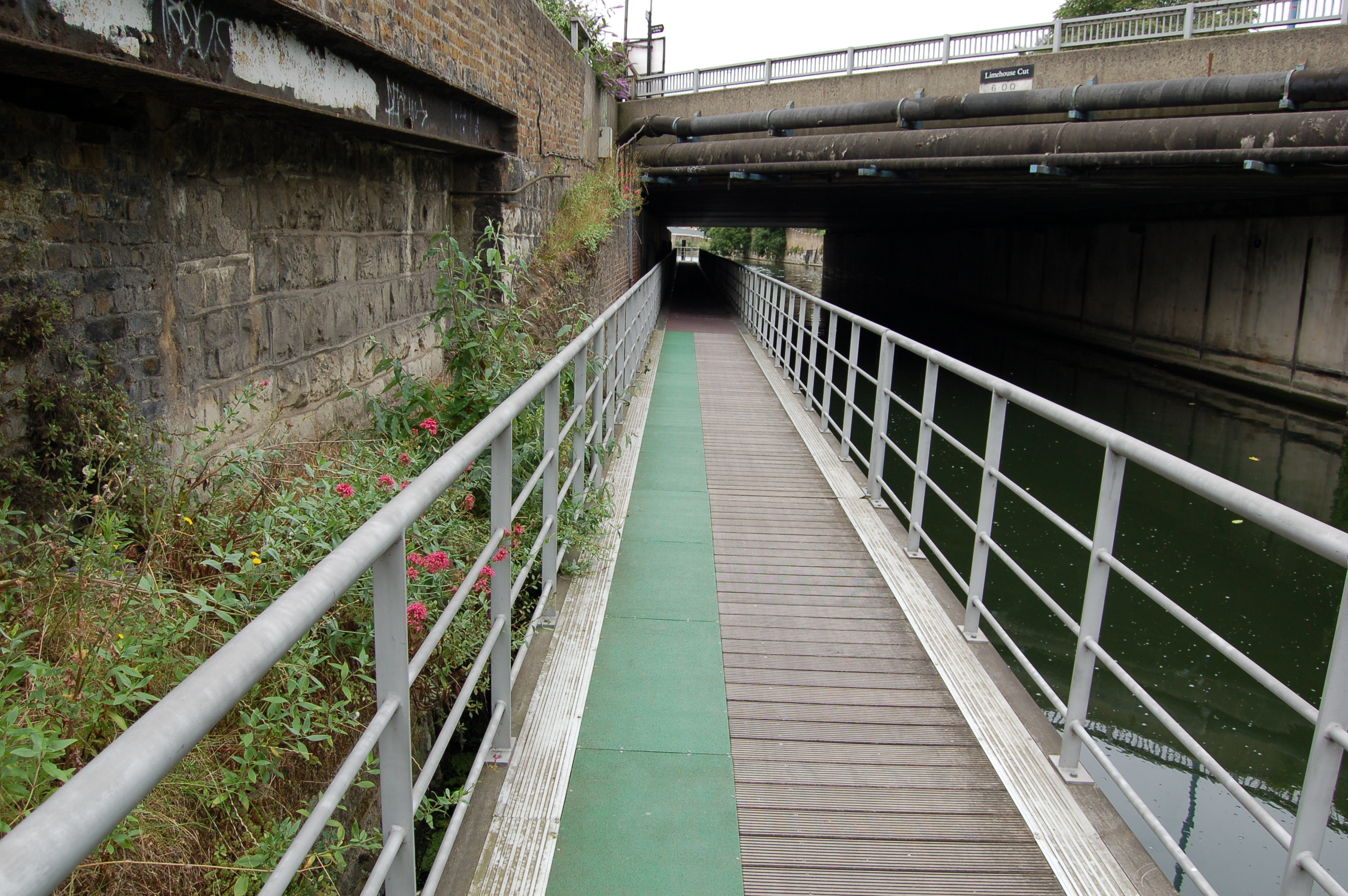
Floating towpath. This award-winning structure was installed in 2003 to link the existing towpath to Bow Locks.

Most use of the canal is for pleasure, both on the water and beside the water on the towpaths. Regent's Canal, the Hertford Union Canal, the Lee Navigation and the Limehouse Cut form a four-sided loop, covering a distance of 5.5 miles (8.9 km), which can be walked or cycled. The scenic towpaths cut across roads and railways in the area, providing a distinct viewpoint.

Access on foot along the Limehouse Cut was difficult in the area below the Blackwall Tunnel approach road, but was made easier as a result of an innovative scheme to create a floating towpath. This was opened in July 2003 and consisted of 60 floating pontoons, creating a 240-metre (262 yd) walkway complete with green glowing edges.

The Cut is part of the Lee Navigation and is administered by the Canal & River Trust. It can accommodate vessels which are 88 by 19 feet (26.8 by 5.8 m). Headroom is limited to 6.75 feet (2.06 m). The lock from Limehouse Basin to the Thames was originally a ship lock, but has been replaced with a smaller one. Although the area around Limehouse Basin and the original lock into the Thames have been extensively developed as part of the Docklands Regeneration scheme, the row of houses overlooking the lock, which were built in 1883 by the Lee Conservators, have been retained and refurbished, while the site of the lock is now a shallow pool. At the end of the London 2012 torch relay, David Beckham arrived with the Olympic torch on a speedboat via the Limehouse Cut to the Olympic opening ceremony.

=== Points of interest ===
Point	Coordinates (Links to map resources)	OS Grid Ref	Notes
Bow Locks	51.5233°N 0.0081°W	TQ382823	northern end of cut
A12 Blackwall Tunnel Approach	51.5216°N 0.0104°W	TQ381821	Floating towpath under bridge
Docklands Light Railway bridge	51.5192°N 0.0154°W	TQ377818	
A13 road bridge	51.5124°N 0.0318°W	TQ366811	
Limehouse Basin	51.5111°N 0.0362°W	TQ363809	southern end of cut

== See also ==
- Spratt's Complex, an adjacent warehouse conversion including a large building called Limehouse Cut
- Canals of the United Kingdom
- History of the British canal system

== Sources ==
=== General ===
- Appleby, John H. (1995). "Charles Dingley, Projector, and his Limehouse Sawmill". In Saunders, Ann Loreille (ed.). London Topographical Record. Vol. XXVII. London Topographical Society. pp. 179–193. ISBN 0-902087-35-5.
- Ayers, Gwendoline M. (1971). England's First State Hospitals and the Metropolitan Asylums Board, 1867-1930. University of California Press. ISBN 9780520017924.
- Baker, T.F.T., ed. (1998). "Stepney: Early Stepney". A History of the County of Middlesex. Vol. 11 (Stepney, Bethnal Green. London: Victoria County History.
- Bazalgette, Joseph William (1865). On the main drainage of London: and the interception of the sewage from the River Thames. Institution of Civil Engineers.
- Beardmore, Nathaniel (1854). "Description of the Navigation and Drainage Works, recently executed on the Tidal portion of the River Lee". Minutes of Proceedings of the Institution of Civil Engineers. XIII.
- Beardmore, N. (12 December 1856). "Improvements in the River Lea Navigation". The Engineer. II: 669–670.
- Bevir, Mark (1996). "Fabianism, Permeation and Independent Labour" (PDF). The Historical Journal. 39 (1). Cambridge University Press: 179–196. doi:10.1017/S0018246X00020720. JSTOR 2639945.
- Boyes, John; Russell, Ronald (1977). The Canals of Eastern England. David and Charles. ISBN 978-0-7153-7415-3.
- Brees, S.C. (1839). Appendix to Railway Practice. London: John Williams, Library of Science of Art.
- Bull, G. B. G. (1958). "Elizabethan Maps of the Lower Lea Valley". The Geographical Journal. 124 (3). The Royal Geographical Society (with the Institute of British Geographers: 375–378. doi:10.2307/1790790. JSTOR 1790790.
- Burch, W. (1853). "A practical essay on the water supply of the northern, north-eastern, and eastern positions of the metropolis, comprising the districts of the New River Company and East London Water Company, etc". Lse Selected Pamphlets. London: Effingham Wilson (LSE Library: LSE Selected Pamphlets). JSTOR 60240696.
- Butler, Sir W.F. (1887). The Campaign of the Cataracts: Being a Personal Narrative of the Great Nile Expedition of 1884-5 (2 ed.). London: Sampson Low, Marston, Searle and Livingston.
- Colburn, Zerah, ed. (1869). "Limehouse Basin Improvement". Engineering. 27.
- Commissioners Appointed to Inquire Into the Best Means of Preventing the Pollution of Rivers (River Lee) (1867). Second Report and Evidence. Her Majesty's Stationery Office.
- Committee of Magistrates (1826). Report on the Public Bridges of Middlesex. London: J. Rider.
- Cooney, E.W. (1991). "Eighteenth Century Britain's Missing Sawmills: A Blessing in Disguise?". Construction History. 7: 29–46. JSTOR 41613688.
- Cooney, E.W. (1998). "Eighteenth Century Britain's Missing Sawmills: A Return Visit". Construction History. 14: 83–7. JSTOR 41601862.
- Cumberlidge, Jane (2009). Inland Waterways of Great Britain (8th Ed.). Imray Laurie Norie and Wilson. ISBN 978-1-84623-010-3.
- Despard, Richard Carden (1858). Manby, Charles (ed.). "Description of the Improvements on the Second Division of the River Lea Navigation: with Remarks on the position of Canals generally, in reference to the development of their resources". Minutes of Proceedings of the Institution of Civil Engineers. XVII.
- Duckworth, George H. (1897). George H.Duckworth's Notebook: Police District 11 [Poplar and Limehouse]. London School of Economics and Political Science Library.
- Dunstan, James (1862). The History of the Parish of Bromley St Leonard in the County of Middlesex. London: Hunt & Son.
- Edwards, Clive D. (1995). "British Imports of American Furniture in the Later Nineteenth Century". Furniture History. 31: 210–216. JSTOR 23407909.
- Edwards, L.A. (1972). Inland Waterways of Great Britain (5 ed.). Huntingdon: Imray, Laurie, Norie and Wilson Ltd. ISBN 085288 012 X.
- Fairclough, Keith Rowland (1986). The River Lea 1571-1767: A River Navigation prior to canalisation (PDF). Queen Mary University of London.
- Fairclough, K.R. (1989). "The River Lea before 1767: An Adequate Flash Lock Navigation" (PDF). The Journal of Transport History. 10 (2): 128–144. doi:10.1177/002252668901000205. S2CID 113432513.
- Farr, William (1852). Report on the Mortality of Cholera in England, 1848-9. London: Her Majesty’s Stationery Office.
- Feldman, David (1983). "There Was an Englishman, An Irishman and a Jew...: Immigrants and Minorities in Britain". The Historical Journal. 26 (1). Cambridge University Press: 185–199. doi:10.1017/S0018246X0001966X. JSTOR 2638855.
- Flower, Captain L. (1877). "Pure Air and Pure Water". Journal of the Society of Arts. 25 (1280): 689–693. JSTOR 41335120.
- "Former Caird & Rayner Premises". Historic England.
- Godwin, George, ed. (25 January 1868). "New Street in Limehouse". The Builder. London.
- "Forrestt and Son". Grace's Guide to British Industrial History.
- Hansard (1852). Parliamentary Debates, 3rd series. Vol. CXIX. London: Cornelius Buck.
- Hansard (1868). Parliamentary Debates, 3rd series, v.190 (Nov. 19, 1867-Mar. 20, 1868). Vol. 190. London: Cornelius Buck.
- Higgins, Clement (1877). A Treatise on the Law Relating to the Pollution & Obstruction of Watercourses. London: Stevens & Haynes.
- Holmes, Rachel (2014). Eleanor Marx: A Lif. Bloomsbury. ISBN 978-0-7475-8384-4.
- House of Commons (1865). Journals. Vol. 120. Hansard.
- Hyndman, Henry Mayers (1911). The Record of an Adventurous life. Macmillan.
- "Island Lead Mills". Grace's Guide to British Industrial History.
- Jones-Baker, Doris (1995). "Technological innovation". RSA Journal. 143 (5461): 22. JSTOR 41376793.
- Keller, Lisa (2009). Triumph of Order: Democracy and Public Space in New York and London. Columbia University Press. ISBN 978-0-231-51847-5.
- Kerr, Matthew Newsom (2015). "Chapter 10: Sites of complaint and complaining: Fever and smallpox hospitals in late-Victorian London". In Reinarz, Jonathan; Wynter, Rebecca (eds.). Complaints, controversies and grievances in medicine: historical and social science perspectives. Routledge. ISBN 978-1-138-79490-0.
- Leather, John (2001). The Gaff Rig Handbook: History, Design, Techniques, Development. Brookline, Maine: Woodenboat Books. ISBN 0-937822-67-1.
- Lengths and Levels to Bradshaw's Maps of Canals, Navigable Rivers and Railways. From an Actual Survey. London: Bradshaw (LSE Selected Pamphlets). 1832. JSTOR 60240452.
- London Borough of Tower Hamlets (2011). "Limehouse Cut Conservation Area" (PDF). London Borough of Tower Hamlets.
- Llewellyn-Smith, H. (1929). "The New Survey of London Life and Labour". Journal of the Royal Statistical Society. 92 (4). Wiley: 530–558. doi:10.2307/2342215. JSTOR 2342215.
- London County Council (1903). Annual Report. London.
- Loudon, J. C., ed. (1836). "Report of the Committee on Mr Martin's Plan for the Improvement of the Banks of the Thames". The Architectural Magazine and Journal of Improvements in Architecture, Building and Furnishing. III. London: Longmans: 360–383.
- Macgregor, John (1880). The Voyage Alone of the Yawl "Rob Roy" (4 ed.). London: Sampson Low, Marston, Searle and Livingston.
- Mansion House Council on the Dwellings of the Poor (1897). A Manual of the Law Affecting the Housing and Sanitary Condition of Londoners. London: Cassell.
- Mayhew, Henry (1861). London Labour and the London Poor: Cyclopædia of the Conditions and Earnings of Those that Will Work, Those that Cannot Work, and Those that Will Not Work. Vol. II. London: Griffin, Bohn.
- Metropolitan Board of Works (1861). Minutes of Proceedings. London.
- Metropolitan Board of Works (1866). Minutes of Proceedings, July–December. London: Brickhill and Batsman.
- Nicholson (2006). Nicholson Guides Vol 1: Grand Union, Oxford and the South East. Harper Collins. ISBN 978-0-00-721109-8.
- Orton, Thomas (1866). Special report by Mr Orton, Medical Officer of Health, upon the cholera epidemic of 1866. London: Board of Works for the Limehouse District.
- "Board of Trade further report, Regent's Canal (Limehouse Basin) Bill". Parliamentary Papers. Vol. LIV. London: HMSO. 1864.
- "Proceedings of the Select Committee on the Lee River Conservancy Bill, Minutes of Evidence". Parliamentary Papers, 1867-1868, Reports from Committees. Vol. XI. London: HMSO.
- Pett Ridge, W. (1923). A Story Teller Forty Years in London. London: Hodder & Stoughton.
- Post Office London (1891). Commercial and Professional Directory for 1891.
- Priestly, Joseph (1831). Historical account of the navigable rivers, canals, and railways, throughout Great Britain, as a reference to Nichols, Priestley & Walker's new map of inland navigation, derived from original and parliamentary documents in the possession of Joseph Priestley, Esq. London: Longman.
- Rendel, James Meadows (1850). "Report on the proposed improvement of the River Lee navigation". Lse Selected Pamphlets (LSE Selected Pamphlets ed.). Hertford, England: Trustees of the Lee Navigation. JSTOR 60240262.
- Robinson, C.N. (1895). "Chapter VIII - Naval Reinforcements in War Time - The Supply of Warship Material and Machinery". In Brassey, T. A. (ed.). The Naval Annual. Portsmouth: J. Griffin.
- Sargent, Edward (2015). "A History of Rope Making (Docklands History Group Meeting March 2015)" (PDF).
- Select Committee on the Royal National Lifeboat Institution (1897). Report of. Her Majesty's Stationery Office.
- Sloane, Nan (2018). The Women in the Room: Labour's Forgotten History. London and New York: Tauris. ISBN 978-1-78831-223-3.
- Smeaton, John (1837). "Upon the New Making and Completing the Navigation of the River Lea, from the River Thames, through Stanstead and Ware to the Town of Hertford". Reports of the late John Smeaton, F.R.S. made on various occasions in the course of his employment as a civil engineer. Vol. I (2 ed.). London: M. Taylor.
- Staniland, C.J. (1886). "Lifeboats and Lifeboat-Men". The English Illustrated Magazine 1885-1886. London and New York: Macmillan.
- The Lancet Sanitary Commission (8 September 1866). "Report on the Epidemic of Cholera in the East End of London". The Lancet. II: 273–274.
- Thomas, Brinley (1936). "The New Survey of London Life and Labour". Economica. New Series. 3 (12). Wiley on behalf of The London School of Economics and Political Science and The Suntory and Toyota International Centres for Economics and Related Disciplines: 461–75. JSTOR 2549252.
- Thomas, Richard (2010a). Bow Back Rivers. History of the Lee and Stort Navigation. Richard Thomas.
- Thomas, Richard (2010b). Limehouse Cut. History of the Lee and Stort Navigation. Richard Thomas.
- Thomas, Richard (2010c). Limehouse Lock. History of the Lee and Stort Navigation. Richard Thomas.
- Vaughn, Laura (2018). Mapping Society: The Spatial Dimensions of Social Cartography. UCL Press. doi:10.14324/111.9781787353053. ISBN 978-1-78735-305-3.
- von Helmholtz-Phelan, Anna A. (1927). The social philosophy of William Morris. Duke University Press.
- Webster, Nicky (2016). 'My Lord Salisbury': An Eighteenth Century Aristocrat in a Nineteenth Century World. Matador. ISBN 978-1785891-458.
- Worth, Jennifer (2012). Call the Midwife: A True Story of the East End in the 1950s (Illustrated ed.). Weidenfeld & Nicolson. ISBN 978-0-297-868-781.

=== Acts of Parliament and law reports ===
- "An Act for Improving the Navigation of the River Lee, from the Town of Hertford to the River Thames; and for extending the said Navigation to the Flood-gates belonging to the Town Mill, in the said Town of Hertford". Anno Regni Georgii III. Regis Magnæ Britanniæ, Franciæ & Hiberniæ, Septimo. London: Mark Baskett, King's Printer. 1766. ("Lee Navigation Improvement Act 1767")
- "An Act to alter and amend the Acts relating to the Navigation of the River Lee, in the Counties of Hertford, Essex, and Middlesex, and to enable the Trustees further to improve the Navigation, and to dispose of the surplus water, and for other purposes.". Local and Personal Laws 1850 ch. 51-112 13 & 14 Vic. London. 1850. ("Lee Navigation Improvement Act 1850")
- Local and Personal Laws 1855 ch. 151-198 17 & 19 Vic. London. 1855. ("River Lee Water Act, 1855")
- Rickards, George Kettilby (1858). "Victoria Park Approach Act, 1858". The Statues of Great Britain and Ireland 21 & 22 Victoria, 1857-8. London: Eyre & Spottiswood. (""Victoria Park Approach Act, 1858")
- "The Queen v. Gilbert (James George), Burton (Harry)". Old Bailey online. 20 April 1885.
- "The Queen v. O'Connell (Patrick), Sullivan (Johanna)". Old Bailey online. 26 July 1897.

=== Maps ===
- Booth, Charles (1898). Maps Decriptive of London Poverty (Map). London School of Economics. Sheet 1.
- Cary, John (1795). New and accurate Plan of London and Westminster (Map).
- Cross, J. (1861). New Plan of London (Map).
- Cruchley, George Frederick (1827). New Plan of London (Map).
- Fairburn, John (1802). Map of London and Westminster (Map).
- Horwood, Richard; Faden, William (1819). Plan of the Cities of London and Westminster the Borough of Southwark, and parts adjoining shewing every house (Map) (4 ed.). London.
- Kelly, Frederic Festus (1857). Kelly's Post Office Directory (Map).
- Mogg, Edward (1809). London in Miniature (Map).
- Ordnance Survey (1895). OS London 1:1,056 — Sheet VII.70 (Map).
- Ordnance Survey (1898). Surrey III.NE six inch map (Map).
- Stanford, Edward (1864). Library Map Of London And Its Suburbs 1864 (Map).
- Telford, Thomas (1834). Map of the New River from its Source near the Town of Ware to London (Map). British Library Maps.Crace.VIII.54. Archived from the original on 30 September 2019.

=== Newspaper and magazine reports ===
Note: Newspapers that are not free-to-view (blue link) are mostly accessible at the British Newspaper Archive (subscription required).

- "News". Oracle. 17th and 18th Century Burney Collection. 28 September 1798.
- "The River Lea. Proposed Improvement of the Navigation". Hertford Mercury and Reformer. 13 April 1850.
- "Improvement of the River Lee". Hertford Mercury and Reformer. 18 May 1850.
- "Improvement of the River Lee". Hertford Mercury and Reformer. 1 June 1850.
- "Improvement of the River Lee: Dinner to John Marchant". Hertford Mercury and Reformer. 7 September 1850.
- "Town Council Meeting". Herts Guardian, Agricultural Journal, and General Advertiser. 8 May 1852.
- "Lee River Trust. Consolidation and Amendment of Acts". Herts Guardian, Agricultural Journal, and General Advertiser. 27 November 1852.
- "The River Lee Tolls". Herts Guardian, Agricultural Journal, and General Advertiser. 26 March 1853.
- "River Lee Tolls". Herts Guardian, Agricultural Journal, and General Advertiser. 28 April 1853.
- "River Lee Tolls". Herts Guardian, Agricultural Journal, and General Advertiser. 28 April 1853.
- "New Life Boats". Norfolk Chronicle. 18 February 1854.
- "Examinations at the Incorporated Law Society". London Evening Standard. 19 November 1856.
- "The Life-Boats of the Royal National Life-Boat Institution". Illustrated London News. 4 December 1858.
- "Fire at Limehouse". The Times. 21 June 1858.
- "The Ayr New Life-Boat". Greenock Advertiser. 28 June 1859.
- "Messrs. Forrestt's Life-Boat Building Yard". Illustrated London News. 16 November 1860.
- "Meeting of Traders on the Lee and Stort Rivers". Herts Guardian, Agricultural Journal, and General Advertiser. 20 February 1864.
- "The River Lee Navigation". Hertford Mercury and Reformer. 17 June 1865.
- Greville F. (6 January 1866). "The River Lea and its Tributaries". Field, The Country Gentleman's Newspaper.
- "Tremendous Conflagration in London". Leeds Times. 12 May 1866.
- "Local Intelligence. Conservancy of the Lee". Hertford Mercury and Reformer. 29 February 1868.
- "Shocking Affair at Limehouse". Morning Post. 17 August 1872.
- "Suspicious Death of a Policeman". Lloyds Weekly Newspaper. 6 October 1872.
- "Naval and Military Intelligence". The Times. 6 May 1878.
- "The Proposed Small-Pox Hospital in Limehouse". East London Observer. 13 January 1877.
- "East London Smallpox Hospital". The Times. 15 January 1877.
- "An East London Industry". East London Observer. 23 October 1880.
- "The Alleged Dynamitards". Dundee Courier. 24 February 1885.
- "The Police and the Public". East London Observer. 8 August 1885.
- "Mr William Morris Taken Into Custody". Sunday Times. 27 September 1885.
- "The Socialist Sunday Meetings at the East End". The Graphic. 3 October 1885.
- Stafford, John Phillip (10 October 1885). "The attitude of the police". Funny Folks.
- "East-End Football Association". Sporting Life. 27 November 1886a.
- "East-End Football Association". Sporting Life. 8 December 1886b.
- "A Life-Boat Competition". Illustrated London News. 18 December 1886.
- "Sporting Diary". Sporting Life. 3 February 1887a.
- "Great Fire at Limehouse". London Evening Standard. 8 November 1887.
- "East End Football Association". Sporting Life. 12 November 1887b.
- Dickens, Charles Jr. (14 January 1888). "The Outcasts' Havens". All the Year Round.
- "An Electric Travelling Crane". The Times. 12 December 1888.
- "An East End 'Mission' Examined". East London Observer. 4 October 1890.
- "Mr Walter Austin and His 'Charities'". Lloyds Weekly Newspaper. 5 October 1890.
- "About Miss Napton and Walter Austin". Lloyds Weekly Newspaper. 28 June 1891.
- "Truth". Sevenoaks Chronicle and Kentish Advertiser. 3 July 1891.
- Cassidy, James (1895). "Peeps Into Busy Places: In an Indiarubber Manufactory". Chatterbox. Vol. XXVI. pp. 198–199, 202–203.
- "Kicking A Mother To Death In Limehouse". Tower Hamlets Independent and East End Local Advertiser. 31 July 1897.
- "Bankruptcy Court". London Evening Standard. 27 July 1906.
- "Eastern Echoes". Tower Hamlets Independent and East End Local Advertiser. 28 August 1909.
- "A Fleet in Waiting". Evening News (London). 20 May 1926.
- "The Lifeboat Hospital". Daily News (London). 1 December 1927.
- "Destructive Oil Works Fire". Aberdeen Press and Journal. 11 July 1929.
- Hillier, Bevis (12 November 1994). "Books: Knowledge of two lifetimes". The Spectator.

=== Tools ===
- Bank of England (2019). "Inflation calculator".
