= Philip Maynard Williams =

British political analyst

Philip Maynard Williams, FBA (17 March 1920 – 16 November 1984) was a British political analyst.

He was educated at the Stationers' Company's School in Hornsey and at Trinity College, Oxford, where he was awarded a first in modern history in 1940. In 1946 he was appointed a lecturer at Trinity and became a Fellow of Nuffield College, Oxford in 1950. From 1953 until 1958 he was a Fellow and Tutor at Jesus College, Oxford, after which he was reappointed Fellow of Nuffield. He was also Dean of Nuffield from 1968 until 1972.

His first book, Politics in Post-War France (1954), was described as "magisterial" by The Times and "unsurpassed" by Stanley Hoffmann. Williams' thesis was that "the difficulties of French government" were attributable "to historical and social, rather than to constitutional or temperamental factors". In 1964 he published a rewritten edition (Crisis and Compromise), writing in the new preface: "I seriously over-estimated the stability of a regime which had yet to face a political and emotional challenge as grave as the Irish question in Britain or the problems of the South in the United States".

In the early 1960s Williams was an active member of the Gaitskellite Campaign for Democratic Socialism. On 10 October 1960 Williams issued a statement (with Julius Gould) in support of the Labour Party leader Hugh Gaitskell:

We, the undersigned Labour Party members and supporters, wholeheartedly support the position taken by Mr. Gaitskell in the Labour Party conference debate on defence and his opposition to a policy of unilateral disarmament or neutralism for Britain. We urge the Parliamentary Labour Party to support their leader in the stand which he has taken.

The 62 signatories to the statement included Janet Vaughan, A. J. Ayer, J. A. G. Griffith, H. L. A. Hart, Stuart Hampshire and William A. Robson.

Roy Jenkins had originally planned to write Gaitskell's official biography but in 1968 he had to abandon it due to his commitments as a government minister. Gaitskell's literary executors (Jenkins and Anthony Crosland), with the agreement of Gaitskell's widow, then asked Williams to write it. Williams' biography of Gaitskell eventually appeared in 1979 and, according to The Times, "it was acknowledged as a masterly political biography". F. M. Leventhal claimed that it "will long remain the definitive assessment of Labour politics between 1951 and 1963". Henry Pelling claimed that it was "the fullest account ever published of the Bevanite split in 1951, of the struggle for unilateral nuclear disarmament, and of Labour's initial reactions to the proposal to enter the European Common Market".

In 1981 he signed the Limehouse Declaration and joined the Social Democratic Party.

Williams was elected a Fellow of the British Academy in 1983.

== Works ==
- Politics in Post-War France: Parties and the Constitution in the Fourth Republic (London: Longmans, 1954; 2nd edn. 1961).
- De Gaulle's Republic (London: Longmans, 1962).
- Crisis and Compromise: Politics in the Fourth Republic (New York: Archon Books, 1964).
- The French Parliament: Politics in the Fifth Republic (New York: F. A. Praeger, 1968).
- Hugh Gaitskell (London: Jonathan Cape, 1979).
