= 1956 Labour Party deputy leadership election =

British political party election

- 2 February 1956

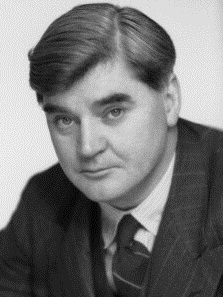
Candidate	Jim Griffiths	Aneurin Bevan
Popular vote	141	111
Percentage	56.0%	44.0%
Deputy Leader before election
Herbert Morrison
Elected Deputy Leader
Jim Griffiths

The 1956 Labour Party deputy leadership election took place on 2 February 1956, following the resignation of sitting deputy leader Herbert Morrison. Morrison resigned after his heavy defeat in the leadership election in December 1955, but the party decided not to hold a deputy leadership election until the new year.

== Candidates ==
Herbert Morrison resigned as Deputy Leader of the Labour Party after a humiliating third-place defeat behind the winner Hugh Gaitskell and the runner-up Aneurin Bevan in the 1955 Labour Party leadership election. During this contest the Labour Party was divided between Bevanite and Gaitskellite wings.

- Aneurin Bevan, Shadow Minister of Labour and National Service, Member of Parliament for Ebbw Vale
- Jim Griffiths, Shadow Secretary of State for the Colonies, Member of Parliament for Llanelli

== Results ==
Only ballot: 2 February 1956
Candidate	Votes	%
Jim Griffiths	141	56.0
Aneurin Bevan	111	44.0
Jim Griffiths elected

The day after the result was announced, the political correspondent of The Glasgow Herald reported that "Mr Griffiths's success was a foregone conclusion", but Bevan attracted a much higher vote than had been expected. He speculated that if Bevan could "keep his personal animosities under control, and restrain his tendency to quarrel with colleagues in public" he would be "a formidable contender" for the post of deputy leader if he were to challenge Griffiths the following year.

As a result of Bevan's performance, his rival Gaitskell appointed him to his Shadow Cabinet as Shadow Colonial Secretary. He also won the election as party treasurer over George Brown in October 1956. One month later, he was promoted to Shadow Foreign Secretary for his fierce denunciation of the Suez Crisis. Afterwards the Bevanites and the Gaitskellites would increasingly reconcile, and Bevan was elected unopposed in the next deputy leadership election after Griffiths' retirement in 1959.

== Notes and references ==
- Quinn, Thomas (2013). "Labour Party Deputy Leadership Elections 1952-2007". University of Essex. Archived from the original on 17 April 2014.
- "Mr J Griffiths's majority of 30". The Times. 3 February 1956.
- "New deputy leader". Manchester Guardian. 3 February 1956.
