= Campaign for Democratic Socialism =

Faction within the British Labour Party

The Campaign for Democratic Socialism or CDS was a social democratic and democratic socialist organisation in the British Labour Party, serving as a pressure group representing the right wing of the party. Established in 1960, the CDS was composed of Gaitskellites, Labour members who supported the then-party leader, Hugh Gaitskell.

The origins of the CDS can be traced to the 1959 general election, which Labour was largely expected to win, but lost due to the Conservatives exploiting public uncertainty over the Labour economic programme. Gaitskell had promised that there would be no new taxes under his administration should he become Prime Minister, not wanting to tamper with the prosperity that had emerged in Britain under the Conservative governments of Winston Churchill, Anthony Eden, and Harold Macmillan. However, the Bevanites – the left wing faction of the Labour Party – had pushed through an electoral manifesto stating it would raise taxes to support increased government expenditures, undercutting Gaitskell's public image. In the aftermath of the electoral failure, which Gaitskell blamed on the Bevanites and their economic views, Gaitskell attempted (and failed) to "modernize" the Labour charter's Clause IV, which called for nationalisation.

As a result of the massive Bevanite grassroots mobilisation against Gaitskell, the CDS was established in October 1960 by a group of Labour politicians and supporters, among the most prominent of which were Bill Rodgers, Dick Taverne, Anthony Crosland, Douglas Jay, Roy Jenkins. They established as their goals the promotion of economic modernisation and reformism as official policies of the party.

Shortly after the CDS was formed, the Labour Party held its 1960 party conference, at which the Bevanites secured the commitment of the party to backing unilateral nuclear disarmament. The CDS declared the need to create a grassroots organisation for the Labour right that could compete with the organisations allied to the Bevanites, specifically Tribune and the Campaign for Nuclear Disarmament, and positioned itself as that organisation. It was extremely successful; at the 1961 party conference the Gaitskellites managed to overturn the previous year's commitment to disarmament largely due to the CDS efforts. In between the 1959 and 1964 elections, 23 of the 29 Labour MPs elected in by-elections were allied to the CDS, as were 7 of the 12 Labour regional election organisers.

After the reversal of the disarmament issue, the CDS returned to its efforts to oppose Clause IV. The CDS also supported British entry into the European Economic Community, which most Gaitskellites supported. CDS influence began to wane, first with the splitting of Gaitskell over the EEC issue in 1962, then with his death and replacement as party leader by the Bevanite Harold Wilson in 1963, a position he retained until 1976. After Wilson became prime minister in the 1964 general elections the CDS shut down.

However, despite Wilson's vows to "smash" the CDS before he would resign as Party Leader, former CDS members managed to elect Roy Jenkins to the position of Deputy Party Leader shortly after the 1970 Labour electoral defeat. However, the Labour left managed to remove him in 1972. In 1977, Bill Rodgers established the Campaign for Labour Victory (CLV), an organization that was somewhat a successor to the CDS. By 1981, the former CDS members had felt that the Labour party had gone too far to the left and claimed that Trotskyists had taken over the party, removing its responsibility to the party membership. As a result, the "Gang of Four" of Labour moderates issued the Limehouse Declaration, stating that they were leaving the Labour Party to establish the Social Democratic Party. Two of the Gang of Four (Roy Jenkins and Bill Rodgers) were former CDS founders, and a number of the younger CDS members joined in leaving Labour for the SDP.

== Bibliography ==
- Bell, Patrick. The Labour Party in Opposition, 1970-1974. London: Routledge, 2004, pp. 3, 190-216.
- Brivati, Brian. "Campaign for Democratic Socialism." In Contemporary British History, Vol. 4, No. 1 (September 1990), pp. 11–12.
- McKenzie, Robert Trelford. British Political Parties: The Distribution of Power within the Conservative and Labour Parties. Charlottesville: University of Virginia, 1963, pg. 622.
