= Limehouse Declaration =

British political manifesto (1981)

The Limehouse Declaration was a statement issued on 25 January 1981 by four senior British Labour politicians, all MPs or former MPs and Cabinet Ministers: Roy Jenkins, David Owen, Bill Rodgers and Shirley Williams. It became known as the Limehouse Declaration as it was made near David Owen's London home in Limehouse. The four were known as the Gang of Four.

The opening paragraph of the declaration indicates that it was triggered by decisions taken at the Labour Party conference in January 1981.

The calamitous outcome of the Labour Party Wembley conference demands a new start in British politics. A handful of trade union leaders can now dictate the choice of a future Prime Minister.

— The Limehouse Declaration (opening)

In this document, the so-called 'Gang of Four' signalled their intent to leave the Labour Party and form a Council for Social Democracy, as they felt the party had been taken over by the left-wing members. This Council became the basis for the British Social Democratic Party (SDP).

The declaration was launched on a small bridge on Narrow Street, Limehouse. Organisation was last-minute, with Matthew Oakeshott being sent to the Savoy Hotel to make photocopies of the statement, and visiting the flat of Shirley Williams to find appropriate clothes for her to wear at the press call.

The four stated that they would soon produce an initial list of politicians and others who would support the new Council for Social Democracy. At this point the 'Gang of Three' (Williams, Rodgers and Owen) had not yet left the Labour Party, but Williams admitted that "almost inevitably" they would take this step. However Williams, whom The Glasgow Herald considered to be the new group's "greatest asset as far as public appeal is concerned", was reported to want to delay the formal split until after the local elections in May in order to avoid upsetting Labour moderates whose support they hoped to win.

One week later, on 5 February 1981, an advertisement was published in The Guardian under the name of the Council for Social Democracy announcing that they had received 8,000 individual messages of support, including a number of people who would go on to form the SDP's youth wing (the Young Social Democrats), such as Daniel Finkelstein and Richard Muller. The advertisement listed one hundred of their names, which included thirteen former Labour MPs, four of whom had been cabinet ministers including George Brown, former Deputy Leader of the Labour Party.

== The Gang of Four ==
Name (Birth–Death)	Portrait	Constituency	Previous Office(s)
Roy Jenkins (1920–2003)		Glasgow Hillhead (from March 1982)	Deputy Leader of the Labour Party (1970–1972); Chancellor of the Exchequer (1967–1970); Home Secretary (1965–1967, 1974–1976); Minister of Aviation (1964–1965)
David Owen (1938–)		Plymouth Devonport	Foreign Secretary (1977–1979); Minister of State for Foreign Affairs (1976–1977); Minister of State for Health and Social Security (1974–1976); Under-Secretary of State for the Navy (1968–1970)
Bill Rodgers (1928–)		Stockton-on-Tees	Transport Secretary (1976–1979); Minister of State for Defence (1974–1976); Minister of State for the Treasury (1969–1970); Minister of State for Trade (1968–1969); Under-Secretary of State for Economic Affairs (1964–1967); Parliamentary Under-Secretary of State for Foreign Affairs (1967–1968)
Shirley Williams (1930–2021)		Crosby (from November 1981)	Education Secretary and Paymaster General (1976–1979); Prices and Consumer Secretary (1974–1976); Minister of State of Home Affairs (1969–1970); Minister of State for Education and Science (1967–1969); Parliamentary Secretary to the Minister for Housing and Local Government (1966–1967)

== The list of 100 ==
Below is the list of 100 Council of Social Democracy supporters whose names were published in the Guardian advertisement of 5 February 1981:

- Austen Albu, former Labour MP
- George Apter, company director
- Michael Barnes, former Labour MP
- Peter Birkby, Chair, Bradford West constituency Labour party (CLP)
- Dick Buchanan, former Labour MP
- Lord Bullock, crossbench peer and historian
- Philip Burgess, university teacher
- Tyrrell Burgess, educationalist
- Alec Cairncross, economist
- George Canning, former Labour Lord Mayor of Birmingham
- John Cannon, historian
- D. L. Carey-Evans, farmer
- Charles Carter, former university vice-chancellor
- Jim Cattermole, former Labour regional organiser
- Frank Chapple, General Secretary, EETPU
- Ann Coulson, former Labour councillor, Birmingham City Council
- Danny Crawford, President, UCATT
- Frederick Dainton, scientist
- Jim Daly, former Labour Greater London Council committee chair
- Richard Davies, administrator
- Edmund Dell, former Labour MP and Cabinet minister
- Lord Diamond, Labour peer and former Cabinet minister
- Lord Donaldson of Kingsbridge, Labour peer and former government minister
- Douglas Eden, polytechnic lecturer and co-founder, Social Democratic Alliance (SDA)
- Geraint Evans, opera singer
- Eddie Fineran, member, ASTMS
- Jean Floud, social scientist
- Lord Flowers, crossbench peer and physicist
- John Frears, Labour councillor, Leicestershire County Council
- Paul Genney, Secretary, Great Grimsby CLP
- Lord George-Brown, former Labour MP and Deputy Leader, and Cabinet minister
- George Godber, former Chief Medical Officer for England and Wales
- John Godfrey, university lecturer
- Celia Goodhart, school teacher
- William Goodhart, barrister
- Frank Hahn, economist
- Willie Hannan, former Labour MP
- Stephen Haseler, polytechnic lecturer and co-founder, SDA
- Eric W. Hawkins, university professor
- Michael Hughes, Secretary, Cardigan CLP
- Sydney Jacobs, former Labour agent and councillor, Liverpool City Council
- Jeffrey Jowell, barrister
- Anthony Lester, barrister
- Clive Lindley, businessman
- Evan Luard, former Labour MP
- Kenneth Lomas, former Labour MP
- Norman MacKenzie, journalist and author
- Anne Mallet, university lecturer
- David Marquand, former Labour MP
- Robert McCullagh, former Labour PPC
- Alec McGivan, Secretary, Campaign for Labour Victory (CLV)
- James Meade, economist
- Stephen Mennell, sociologist
- Anne Mitchell, school teacher
- Joan Mitchell, economist
- John Morgan, writer and broadcaster
- Norman Morris, obstetrician and gynaecologist
- Huw Morris-Jones, university professor
- William Mowbray, former President, Scottish TUC
- Leslie Murphy, businessman
- Richard Murray, former Labour PPC
- Angela Newton, former Labour councillor, South Holland District Council
- Julia Neuberger, rabbi
- Hilda Nickson, Officer, North Norfolk CLP
- David Pannick, barrister
- Lord Perry of Walton, crossbench peer and former university vice-chancellor
- Colin Phipps, former Labour MP
- John Pick, engineer
- Frank Pickstock, former Labour Lord Mayor of Oxford
- Usha Prashar, social administrator
- Frank Price, former Labour Lord Mayor of Birmingham
- Steve Race, composer and pianist
- Dora Radcliffe, member, Bebington CLP
- Michael Rawlins, pharmacologist
- John Riches, school headteacher
- John Rickarby, branch Chair, Lowestoft CLP
- Eirlys Roberts, consumer rights campaigner
- Kenneth Robinson, former Labour MP and Cabinet minister
- Kirby Robinson, Treasurer, Newcastle East CLP
- David Sainsbury, businessman
- Lord Sainsbury, Labour peer and businessman
- Anthony Sampson, author and broadcaster
- Jack Service, General Secretary, CSEU
- Keith Smith, Scottish Organiser, CLV
- Robert Souhami, physician
- Janet Suzman, actress
- Dick Taverne, former Labour and Democratic Labour MP
- Clem Thomas, rugby journalist and former Liberal parliamentary candidate
- Stuart Thompstone, former Secretary, Newark CLP
- Lady Thomson of Monifieth
- Polly Toynbee, journalist
- Barbara Ward, Baroness Jackson of Lodsworth, crossbench peer and economist
- Jack Watson, Secretary, Argyll CLP
- Clive Wilkinson, Leader, Birmingham City Council
- Philip Williams, political historian and biographer of Hugh Gaitskell
- Peter Wilson, Labour councillor, Lothian Regional Council
- Ian Wright, President, Cambridge Students' Union
- Lord Young of Dartington, Labour peer and sociologist
- Wayland Young, 2nd Baron Kennet, Labour peer and author
- Michael Zander, legal scholar

== Cultural references ==
The events leading up to the declaration were the basis of the play Limehouse by Steve Waters at the Donmar Warehouse.
