= 1960 Labour Party leadership election =

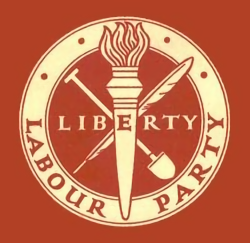
- 3 November 1960
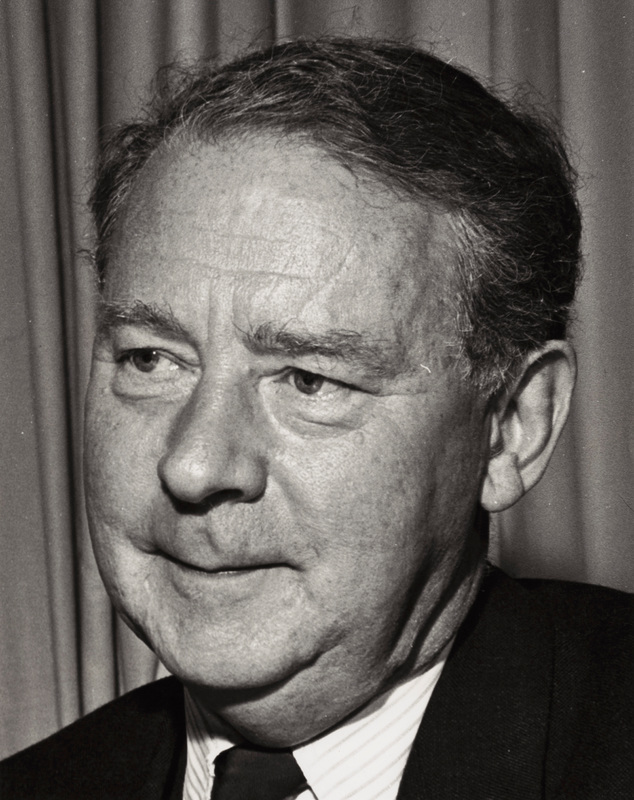

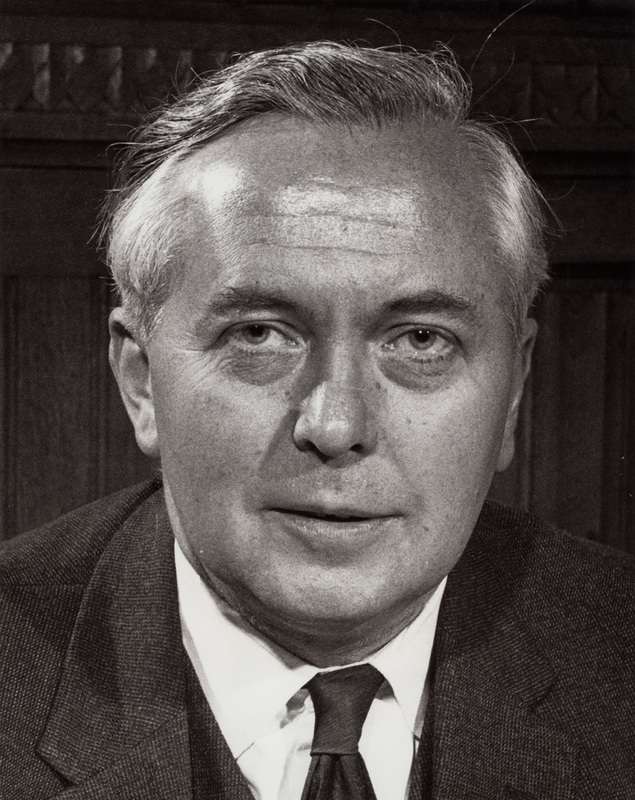
Candidate	Hugh Gaitskell	Harold Wilson
Popular vote	166	81
Percentage	67.2%	32.8%
Leader before election
Hugh Gaitskell
Elected Leader
Hugh Gaitskell

The 1960 Labour Party leadership election was held when, for the first time since 1955, the incumbent leader Hugh Gaitskell was challenged for re-election. Normally the annual re-election of the leader had been a formality. Gaitskell had lost the 1959 general election and had seen the Labour Party conference adopt a policy of unilateral nuclear disarmament which he considered disastrous and refused to support. A vacancy in the deputy leadership was first made by the death of incumbent Aneurin Bevan.

== Background ==
Following the heavy defeat of the Labour Party in the 1959 general election, its leader Hugh Gaitskell had determined that the party must change fundamentally to make itself electable. He decided to attempt to rewrite Clause IV of the party constitution, which appeared to commit it to nationalisation of every industry. However his move provoked firm opposition from the major unions and the left wing of the party, and facing certain defeat, he withdrew it in March 1960. In the meantime the Government's decision to abandon the British Blue Streak missile and buy instead the US Skybolt system had made nuclear weapons a prominent political issue. Gaitskell supported the decision to buy an American system and to remain in NATO, a policy stance which outraged the left. At the party conference in Scarborough in October 1960, motions calling for unilateral nuclear disarmament were carried despite Gaitskell's speech declaring that he and his allies would "fight and fight and fight again to save the Party we love".

Elections for the Leader and Deputy Leader were formally held by the Parliamentary Labour Party at the beginning of each Parliamentary session, which happened later in October. There was already a vacancy for the Deputy Leader of the Party due to the death of Aneurin Bevan in July, and many senior party figures were weighing up whether to stand for that post; contested elections for vacant posts were usual, but incumbents were not normally challenged. The result of the faction-fighting was that many on the left thought Gaitskell was both out of touch with the party and that a challenge might force him to the left, so they were keen to have a credible challenger. One left candidate who was keen to fight for the deputy leadership was Harold Wilson, who found himself subjected to pressure to challenge Gaitskell instead. Peter Shore, then head of the Research Department at party headquarters, thought Gaitskell had lost the confidence of party staff and Wilson could restore it. Jennie Lee, Bevan's widow and a fellow Labour MP, led a delegation to Wilson.

Wilson resisted but his hand was forced when Anthony Greenwood resigned from the Shadow Cabinet saying he would not serve under Gaitskell while he defied conference decisions. Greenwood then announced his candidature for leader but said he would stand aside in favour of someone with "broader" appeal, by which he meant Wilson. Wilson knew that the leadership challenge would not succeed but thought he stood a good chance of winning the deputy leadership; what changed his mind was the fear that he would lose the mantle of the left-wing standard bearer should he not stand. He was also still furious with Gaitskell over a failed attempt to move him from the post of Shadow Chancellor of the Exchequer the previous year. Although Wilson was aligned to the left, he was not a supporter of unilateralism; in standing for the leadership he said the issue was "unity versus civil war".

== Candidates ==
Only two candidates were nominated.

- Hugh Gaitskell (born 1906), had been MP for Leeds South since 1945 and served as Chancellor of the Exchequer in 1950–1951. Gaitskell was elected party leader in 1955. He was aligned with the right wing of the party.
- Harold Wilson (born 1916), the MP for Ormskirk from 1945 to 1950 and for Huyton since 1950, had been President of the Board of Trade from 1947 but resigned from the Attlee cabinet in April 1951 in opposition to National Health Service prescription charges (which Gaitskell had introduced in order to pay for the Korean War). Wilson had been a Bevanite in the early 1950s but had returned to the front bench and served as Shadow Chancellor under Gaitskell's leadership.

== Ballot ==
The result of the only ballot of Labour MPs on 3 November was as follows:

Only ballot: 3 November 1960
Candidate	Votes	%
Hugh Gaitskell	166	67.2
Harold Wilson	81	32.8
Majority	85	34.4
Turnout	229	N/A
Hugh Gaitskell re-elected
