= Gaitskellism =

British Labour Party ideology

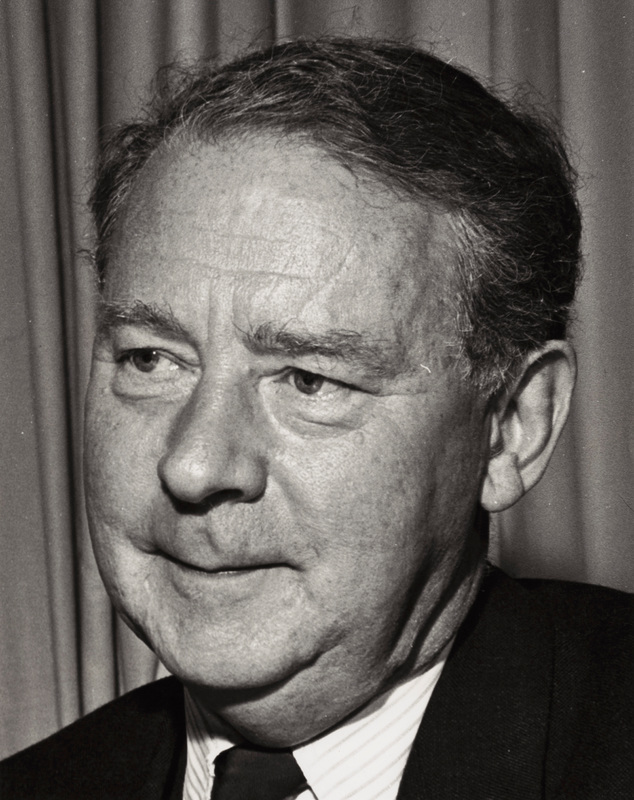
Hugh Gaitskell

Gaitskellism was the ideology of a faction in the British Labour Party in the 1950s and early 1960s which opposed many of the economic policies of the trade unions, especially nationalisation and control of the economy.

Theoretically, it repudiated the long-standing orthodox position that identified socialism with public ownership of the means of production, and that such ownership was essential to achieve socialist objectives, and emphasized the goals of personal liberty, social welfare, and, above all, social equality. It downplayed loyalty to the labour movement as a central ethical goal, and argued that the new goals could be achieved if the government used appropriate fiscal and social policy measures within the context of a market-oriented mixed economy. Public ownership was not specifically rejected, but was seen as merely one of numerous useful devices.

The movement was led by Hugh Gaitskell and included Anthony Crosland, Roy Jenkins, Douglas Jay, Patrick Gordon Walker, and James Callaghan, influenced by the teachings of London school economist Evan Durbin. Gaitskellites represented the political right of the Labour Party and were opposed by the Bevanites, the left-wing faction of the party led by Aneurin Bevan and Michael Foot. In the 1950s, there were many parallels between Gaitskellism and the economic policies of Rab Butler, the Conservative Chancellor of the Exchequer. This convergence of the two main parties was dubbed "Butskellism".

== History ==
In the 1945 general election, the Labour Party won its first majority in Parliament, with Clement Attlee becoming prime minister. Both Gaitskell and Bevan took positions in the Cabinet, Gaitskell as Minister of Fuel and Power and Bevan as Minister of Health.

In October 1950, Stafford Cripps was forced to resign as Chancellor of the Exchequer due to failing health, and Gaitskell was appointed to succeed him. His time as Chancellor was dominated by the struggle to finance Britain's part in the Korean War, which put enormous strain on public finances. The cost of the war meant that savings had to be found from other budgets. Gaitskell's budget of 1951 introduced charges for certain prescriptions on the National Health Service.

He had a falling out with Bevan, who had defended the NHS and had left over the matter, and the budget split the government. Harold Wilson and John Freeman joined Bevan in resigning in protest of Gaitskell's policies. Later that year, Labour lost power to the Conservatives in the 1951 election. Gaitskell was replaced as Chancellor by Rab Butler, who largely continued Gaitskell's economic policies. This was termed Butskellism and laid the foundation for the post-war consensus.

During the period of opposition, the feud between the Gaitskellites and Bevanites continued. In 1954, Gaitskell and Bevan ran against each other for the position of Treasurer of the Labour Party, which was seen as a stepping-stone to the position of Party Leader. Gaitskell defeated Bevan. Following Labour's defeat in the 1955 election, Attlee announced his retirement as Party Leader (and subsequently, Leader of the Opposition). In the leadership election, the Labour left rallied around Bevan, while the Labour right was split between Gaitskell and Herbert Morrison. Gaitskell defeated both, gaining almost sixty per cent of the vote, and on 14 December 1955 became both Leader of the Labour Party and Leader of the Opposition.

During the early period of Gaitskell's tenure as Party Leader, the opposition between the Gaitskellites and Bevanites simmered, centring mainly on the issues of nuclear disarmament (which the Bevanites supported and the Gaitskellites opposed) and Britain's participation in NATO, specifically the foreign policy of opposing the Soviet Union and supporting the United States (which the Bevanites opposed and Gaitskellites supported). However, during this initial period the factional infighting dimmed somewhat; Gaitskell appointed Bevan to the Shadow Cabinet as Shadow Colonial Secretary and then Shadow Foreign Minister, the position he held during the Suez Crisis which enabled him to formulate Labour's response to the actions of Prime Minister Anthony Eden. Also in 1956, Bevan was elected Party Treasurer, defeating the Gaitskellite candidate, George Brown. Ironically, in 1957 Bevan split from the Bevanites due to a speech he gave opposing nuclear disarmament at the annual Labour Party conference.

The hostilities between factions exploded again after the 1959 election. Labour was widely expected to win the election, with the Conservatives unpopular after the Suez Crisis. However, the Conservatives managed to increase their majority, largely due to the Conservatives' exploiting Labour's internal divisions over economics. The Labour election manifesto, drafted by the left, stated that it would raise taxes to pay for an increase in spending, especially pensions, while Gaitskell publicly promised that he would not raise taxes. After the election Gaitskell blamed the Bevanite economic position for the electoral defeat and, in an effort to modernize the party in the face of the Conservatives' electoral and economic successes, attempted to reverse the Labour charter's Clause IV calling for nationalisation. The Bevanites managed to defeat this attempt. The Clause IV struggle had the effect of creating the pro-Gaitskellite Campaign for Democratic Socialism as a pressure group within the party. In 1960 the Bevanites managed to commit to Labour backing nuclear disarmament, only for the Gaitskellites to reverse it in 1961.

In 1959, Bevan was elected Deputy Party Leader, only to die shortly before the 1960 party leadership election. The Bevanites instead backed Harold Wilson, who lost to Gaitskell by almost two-thirds of the vote. However, the factional infighting, largely over the nuclear issue, was so much that there was another party leadership election the next year. In that election, the Bevanites backed Anthony Greenwood, who lost to Gaitskell by almost three-fourths of the vote.

Near the end of his life, Gaitskell himself began to move away from the Gaitskellites on several issues. The Gaitskellites generally supported Britain entering the European Economic Community, which Gaitskell opposed, claiming it would cause the end of Britain as an independent nation. In early 1963, Gaitskell died. In the ensuing party leadership election Wilson again was the candidate of the former Bevanites, while the Gaitskellite vote was split between George Brown and James Callaghan. In the first round of voting, the two Gaitskellites split the right-wing vote, with Wilson getting 47% of the vote. In the second round between Wilson and Brown, Wilson won with 58% of the vote, the same margin that Gaitskell had on his election in 1955.

== Legacy ==
Wilson went on to become Prime Minister at the 1964 general election, holding the office from 1964-70 and again from 1974-76. Despite being a former Bevanite, Wilson largely followed Gaitskellite economic policies, and the former Gaitskellite Callaghan followed Wilson as Prime Minister from 1976-79 and Leader of the Labour Party from 1976-80.

As late as 1977, Austin Mitchell still described himself as a Gaitskellite during his initial run for Parliament.

In 1981, largely in response to the election of the former Bevanite Michael Foot as party leader, the formerly-Gaitskellite Campaign for Democratic Socialism members eventually left the Labour Party to establish the more moderate Social Democratic Party.

In 1983, Foot was replaced as party leader by Neil Kinnock, who moved the party towards the centre and away from its traditional base, accordingly with the breakdown of the post-war consensus. He was replaced as leader in 1992 by former Gaitskellite John Smith. When Tony Blair became Leader of the Labour Party in 1994 and then Prime Minister in 1997, he continued to move the party towards the right, and he largely followed the Gaitskellite positions on economics and defence, ending the party's Clause IV commitment to nationalisation in 1995, supporting the UK Trident programme, and retaining close relations with the United States.

== See also ==
- The Future of Socialism
- Godesberg Program
- Blairism
