= Labour Party Constitution =

Rulebook of the UK's Labour Party

The Labour Party Constitution is the rulebook of the UK Labour Party.

== Original in 1918 ==
The original Labour Party constitution was drafted by Sidney Webb, a founder of the London School of Economics and Fabian Society. The objects of the Labour Party were as follows:

1. To organise and maintain in parliament and in the country a political Labour Party

2. To cooperate with the General Council of the Trades Union Congress, or other kindred organisations, in joint political or other action in harmony with the party constitution and standing orders.

3. To give effect as far as possible to the principles from time to time approved by the party conference.

4. To secure for the workers by hand or by brain the full fruits of their industry and the most equitable distribution thereof that may be possible upon the basis of the common ownership of the means of production, distribution, and exchange, and the best obtainable system of popular administration and control of each industry or service.

5. Generally to promote the political, social and economic emancipation of the people, and more particularly of those who depend directly upon their own exertions by hand or by brain for the means of life.

== 1960 amendments ==
In 1960, Hugh Gaitskill attempted amendments to the constitution, including change of clause IV, but was voted down. However two further points were added.

6. To cooperate with labour and socialist organisations in the commonwealth overseas with a view to promoting the purposes of the party and to take common action for the promotion of a higher standard of social and economic life for the working population of the respective countries. 7. To cooperate with the labour and socialist organisations in other countries and to support the United Nations and its various agencies and other international organisations for the promotion of peace, the adjustment and settlement of international disputes by conciliation or judicial arbitration, the establishment and defence of human rights, and the improvement of the social and economic standards and conditions of work of the people of the world

== Current version ==
The Labour Party Constitution was amended in 1995 under Tony Blair, and changed the "Aims and Values" under Clause IV as follows.

1. The Labour Party is a democratic socialist party. It believes that by the strength of our common endeavour, we achieve more than we achieve alone so as to create for each of us the means to realise our true potential and for all of us a community in which power, wealth and opportunity are in the hands of the many not the few, where the rights we enjoy reflect the duties we owe, and where we live together, freely, in a spirit of solidarity, tolerance and respect.

2. To these ends we work for:

A. A dynamic economy, serving the public interest, in which the enterprise of the market and the rigour of competition are joined with the forces of partnership and co-operation to produce the wealth the nation needs and the opportunity for all to work and prosper, with a thriving private sector and high quality public services, where those undertakings essential to the common good are either owned by the public or accountable to them
B. A just society, which judges its strength by the condition of the weak as much as the strong, provides security against fear, and justice at work; which nurtures families, promotes equality of opportunity and delivers people from the tyranny of poverty, prejudice and the abuse of power
C. An open democracy, in which government is held to account by the people; decisions are taken as far as practicable by the communities they affect; and where fundamental human rights are guaranteed;
D. A healthy environment, which we protect, enhance and hold in trust for future generations.

3. Labour is committed to the defence and security of the British people, and to cooperating in European institutions, the United Nations, the Commonwealth and other international bodies to secure peace, freedom, democracy, economic security and environmental protection for all.

4. Labour will work in pursuit of these aims with trade unions, co-operative societies and other affiliated organisations, and also with voluntary organisations, consumer groups and other representative bodies.

5. On the basis of these principles, Labour seeks the trust of the people to govern.

== See also ==
- Labour Party (UK)
- United Kingdom labour law
- United Kingdom enterprise law
