= 1955 Labour Party leadership election =

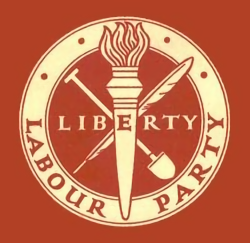
- 14 December 1955
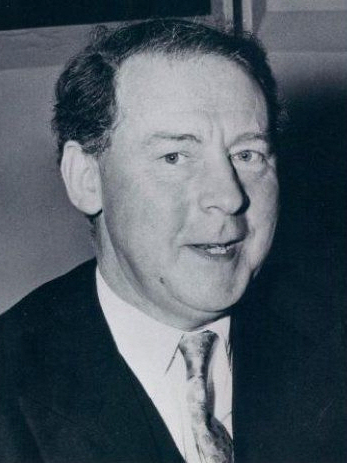

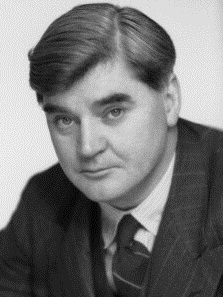

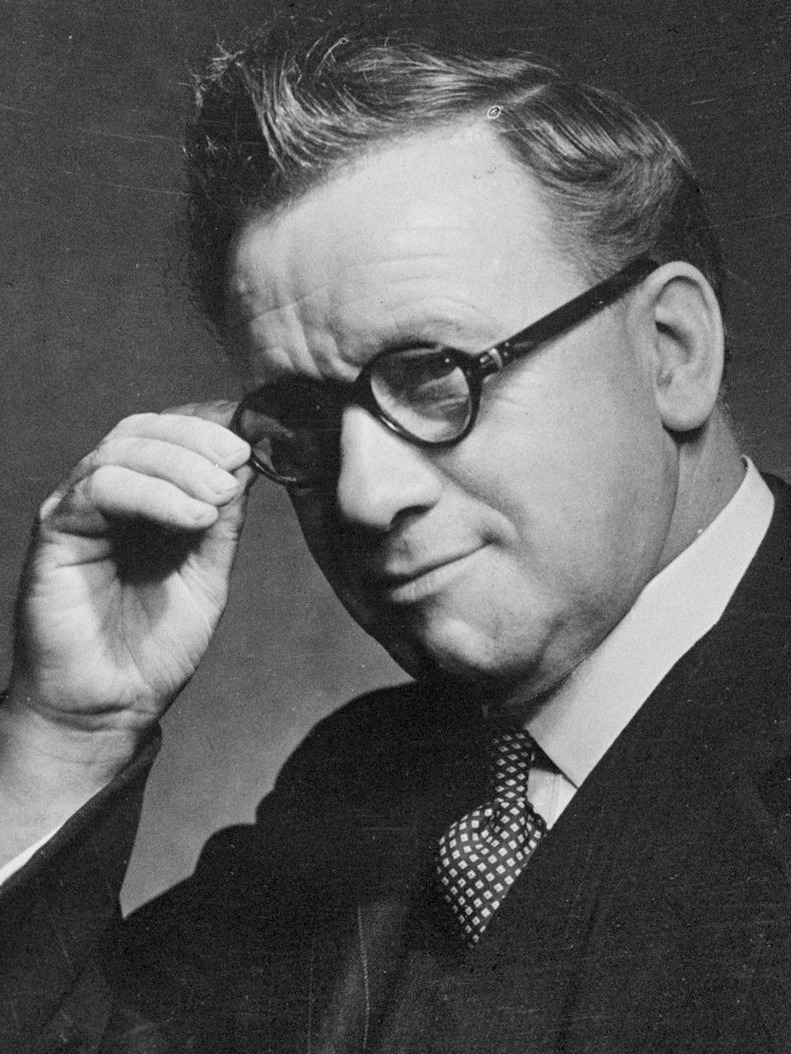
Candidate	Hugh Gaitskell	Aneurin Bevan	Herbert Morrison
Popular vote	157	70	40
Percentage	58.8%	26.2%	15.0%
Leader before election
Herbert Morrison (interim)
Clement Attlee
Elected Leader
Hugh Gaitskell

The 1955 Labour Party leadership election was held following the resignation of Clement Attlee. Attlee was Prime Minister from 1945 to 1951 and stayed on as party leader until he lost the 1955 general election.

== Candidates ==
=== Declared candidates ===
- Aneurin Bevan, Shadow Minister of Labour and National Service, Member of Parliament for Ebbw Vale
- Hugh Gaitskell, Shadow Chancellor of the Exchequer, Member of Parliament for Leeds South
- Herbert Morrison, incumbent Deputy Leader, Member of Parliament for Lewisham South

=== Potential candidates who declined to run ===
- Jim Griffiths, Shadow Secretary of State for the Colonies, Member of Parliament for Llanelli

== Campaign ==
Despite his advancing age and Labour's loss of the 1951 general election, Labour Party Leader Clement Attlee delayed his retirement from politics in order to keep the Labour Party united during its fracture between Gaitskellite and Bevanite factions. He also did not want Deputy Leader Herbert Morrison to assume full Leadership. Beginning with the retirement of Hugh Dalton following the 1951 election most senior members of the Labour Party aside from Morrison resigned from the government, leaving the leadership open to a new generation of the party when Attlee finally resigned due to Labour's loss of the 1955 election.

Morrison was once considered the heir apparent to Attlee, but by the early 1950s was widely distrusted and was considered to be too old for the job. Aneurin Bevan had next been considered the primary front-runner for the Labour Party leadership, but had resigned from the Cabinet in 1951 to protest the introduction of National Health Service prescription charges. Despite the Bevanites dominating the National Executive Committee, Bevan himself weakened his support through his hostile relations with the Parliamentary Labour Party. Hugh Gaitskell simultaneously emerged as a potential candidate after a successful tenure as Chancellor of the Exchequer and after the trade union movement which had backed Bevan increasingly gravitated towards him.

Three candidates were nominated, The left wing father of the National Health Service, Bevan, the younger centrist candidate from the right wing of the party Gaitskell, the former Chancellor of the Exchequer and the former Deputy Prime Minister Morrison, who had been deputy leader as well as having served in the senior ministerial offices of Home Secretary and Foreign Secretary, was also seeking the leadership. Morrison, the leading London politician of his generation, had been an MP since 1923 (with some breaks) and was representing Lewisham South in 1955.

Morrison believed he would easily win against Gaitskell and Bevan on the basis of seniority, despite being warned he would actually be routed due to his old age and unpopularity in the party. Gaitskell initially endorsed Morrison but entered the race himself in order to prevent Bevan from winning. Bevan likewise continued his campaign despite being aware he could not win solely to deny Gaitskell the leadership, at one point proposing that they both stand down and allow Morrison to run unopposed. Gaitskell crucially won the endorsement of the "Big Three" trade unions who between them sponsored 40 percent of Labour MPs: the Transport and General Workers' Union under Arthur Deakin, the National Union of Mineworkers under Will Lawther, and the General and Municipal Workers Union under Tom Williamson.

== Ballot ==
The result of the only ballot of Labour MPs on 14 December was as follows:

Only ballot: 14 December 1955
Candidate	Votes	%
Hugh Gaitskell	157	58.8
Aneurin Bevan	70	26.2
Herbert Morrison	40	15.0
Majority	87	32.6
Turnout	267	96.4
Hugh Gaitskell elected

Gaitskell won the largest victory of any Labour Party leadership election until Neil Kinnock in 1983.

Following the election, Morrison resigned as Deputy Leader of the Labour Party. Bevan also ran for the subsequent 1956 Labour Party deputy leadership election but narrowly lost to Jim Griffiths. However, he performed well enough in the election to be re-elected to Gaitskell's Shadow Cabinet, and the Gaitskellite and Bevanite factions of the party would increasingly reconcile after the Suez Crisis. Bevan finally became Deputy Leader after Griffiths' retirement in 1959 and held the office until his death a year later.
