= 1961 Labour Party leadership election =

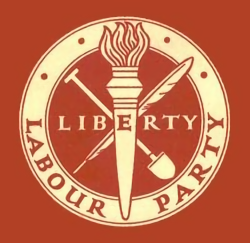
- 2 November 1961
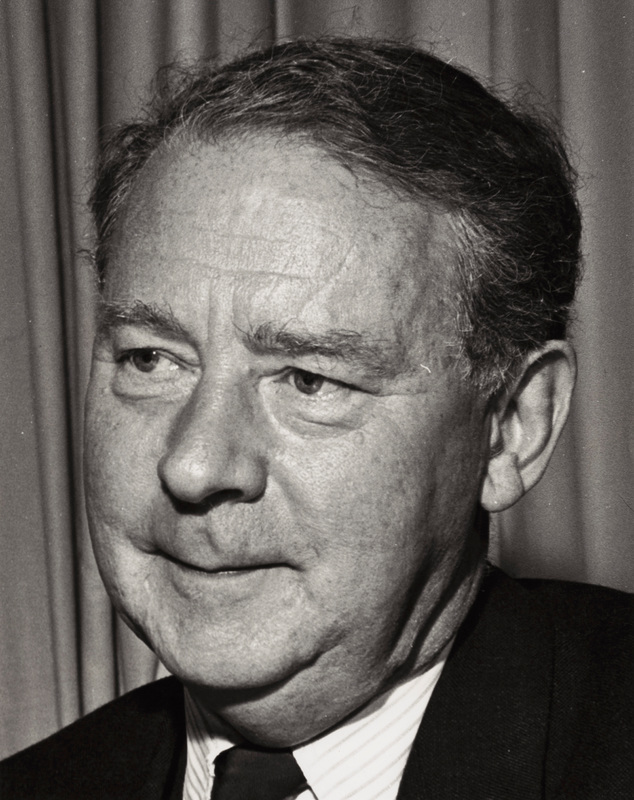

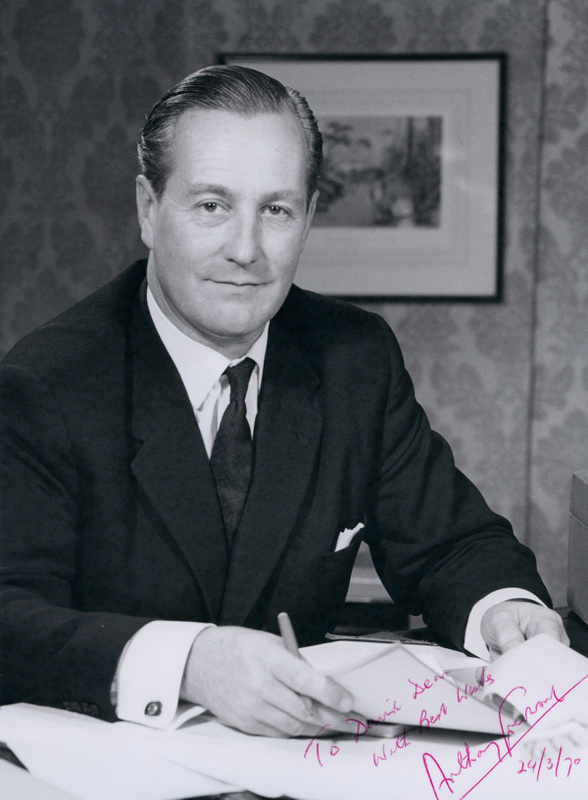
Candidate	Hugh Gaitskell	Tony Greenwood
Popular vote	171	59
Percentage	74.4%	25.7%
Leader before election
Hugh Gaitskell
Elected Leader
Hugh Gaitskell

The 1961 Labour Party leadership election was held when, for the second year in succession, the incumbent leader was challenged for re-election. Normally the annual re-election of the leader had been a formality.

The challenge followed factional in-fighting over issues like nuclear disarmament. The leader favoured the retention of nuclear weapons by the UK, whereas the left wing of the party supported the Campaign for Nuclear Disarmament.

== Candidates ==
Two candidates were nominated.

1. The left-wing candidate the previous year had been Harold Wilson. In 1961 the candidate was a less well-known political figure, Tony Greenwood (1911–1982), then MP for the Lancashire constituency of Rossendale. He had been an MP since 1946 and was the son of Arthur Greenwood (1880–1954), who had been a Labour leadership candidate in 1935.
2. The incumbent right-wing leader of the party was Hugh Gaitskell (1906–1963), who had been Chancellor of the Exchequer in 1950–51. Gaitskell had been MP for Leeds South since 1945 and party leader since 1955.

== Ballot ==
The result of the only ballot of Labour MPs on 2 November was as follows:

Only ballot: 2 November 1961
Candidate	Votes	%
Hugh Gaitskell	171	74.35
Tony Greenwood	59	25.65
Majority	112	48.70
Turnout	230	N/A
Hugh Gaitskell re-elected
