= Brian Brivati =

British historian

Brian Leopoldo Brivati is a British historian. He was a professor of contemporary history at Kingston University and worked as a director of the John Smith memorial trust from 2008 to 2012.

His work has appeared in The Guardian, The Times, the Financial Times, The Independent on Sunday, The Observer, New Statesman, Progress, the Fabian Review and Parliamentary Brief. Brivati has appeared as a political commentator on BBC Radio 4.

Brivati is a specialist in designing and delivering professional development, leadership and bespoke training programmes for government, NGOS, the private sector and overseas clients. He also works as a special adviser to politicians, government departments and civil society organisations in Central and Eastern Europe, Iraq and other Middle East countries.

Brivati's academic career evolved from public policy, political history and biography into the teaching of Human Rights. His research interests are focussed on the interface between human rights and cyber security, the evolving nature of conflict, and the place of genocide and crimes against humanity in contemporary politics. Before joining PGI, he was Professor of Human Rights and Life Writing at Kingston University and is still a visiting Lecturer there.

He is academic director of the PGI Cyber Academy and an adviser to Cleave and Co, and co-chair of the Kurdish Genocide UK advisory council. He also sits on the editorial boards of Total Politics and the IPPR Journal. Brivati is a frequent contributor to print and broadcast media and a keynote and guest lecturer on a range of topics in the UK and abroad.

Brivati is a director of The Stabilisation and Recovery Network.

== Works ==
- Brivati, Brian, ed. (22 February 2022). Losing Afghanistan: The Fall of Kabul and the End of Western Intervention. Biteback Publishing. ISBN 978-1-78590-732-6.
- Brivati, Brian (20 July 2021). Icarus: The Life and Death of the Abraaj Group. Biteback Publishing. ISBN 978-1-78590-722-7.
- Brivati, Brian (2021). Arif Naqvi's Abraaj Group & the Geopolitics of Karachi Electric. Vanguard Books. ISBN 978-969-402-642-8.
- Brivati, Brian (2007). The End of Decline: Blair and Brown in Power. Politico's. ISBN 978-1-84275-171-8.
- Bale, Tim; Brivati, Brian (11 September 2002). New Labour in Power: Precedents and Prospects. Routledge. ISBN 978-1-134-68114-3.
- Brivati, Brian; Heffernan, Richard, eds. (8 May 2000). The Labour Party: A Centenary History. Springer. ISBN 978-0-230-59558-3.
- Brivati, Brian (1999). Lord Goodman. Richard Cohen Books. ISBN 978-1-86066-156-3.
- Brivati, Brian (1996). Hugh Gaitskell. Richard Cohen Books. ISBN 978-1-86066-073-3.
- Brivati, Brian; Buxton, Julia; Seldon, Anthony, eds. (1996). The Contemporary History Handbook. Manchester University Press. ISBN 978-0-7190-4836-4.
- Brivati, Brian (September 1990). "Campaign for democratic socialism". Contemporary Record. 4 (1): 11–12. doi:10.1080/13619469008581098.
- Brivati, Brian (8 January 2007). "The Blair audit: war, human rights, liberalism". openDemocracy.
- Brivati, Brian (14 March 2014). "Tony Benn obituary". the Guardian.
- "Brian Brivati, Author at New Statesman". New Statesman.
- "Brian Brivati Articles". Progress Archives. Progressive Britain.
- "Brian Brivati". Dissent.
- "Brian Brivati". Euston Manifesto.
