= Parliamentary Brief =

First published in 1992, Parliamentary Brief is a monthly British political magazine circulated by request to members of the British House of Commons, members of the House of Lords, senior civil servants, and political journalists. Reports—some produced in association with international institutions, including the United Nations—are distributed to a wider audience. This includes, for example, the European Union, public sector bodies, and corporate organisations. It is based in London.

Dubbed by one political commentator as the ‘magazine for the political in-crowd’ its editorial columns are noted for their expert analysis. Many of the topics it covers do not make headlines in the mainstream press, but nevertheless are critical to analysis of government policy at home and abroad. It has been described as ‘required reading’ (George Jones, political editor, The Daily Telegraph), with ‘an impressive range of sources’ (Philip Gould, adviser to the Prime Minister, 10 Downing Street). It is no longer in print.

Parliamentary Brief April 2007 cover

Wholly independent, Parliamentary Brief has no association or links with any political party though as part of its coverage of current affairs it publishes articles by senior figures from across the political divide.

Although ‘non-party’ its commentary is often severely critical. It has pursued campaigns with some distinction — for example, in highlighting genocide in Darfur long before that issue was taken up by the general media and in warning of the shortfalls in the UK government’s response to climate change.
