= Hugh Gaitskell =

British politician (1906–1963)

The Right Honourable Hugh Gaitskell CBE
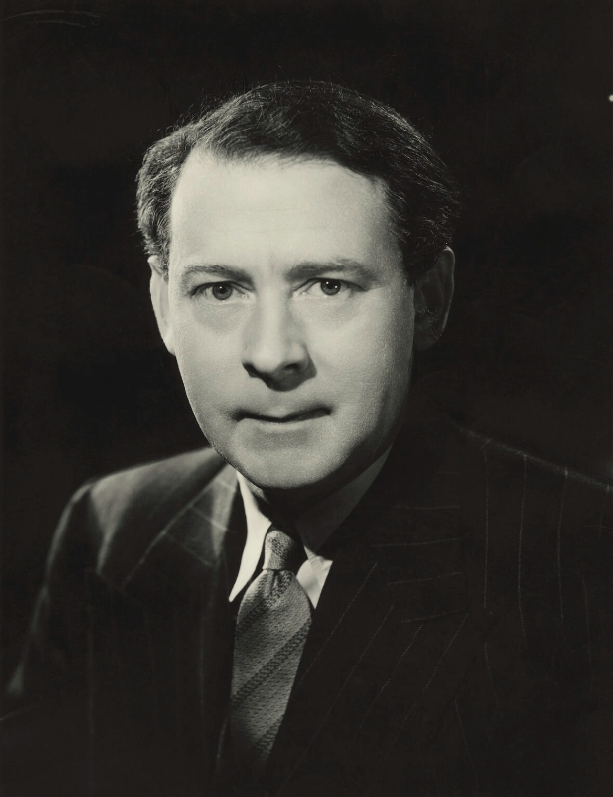
- Gaitskell in 1947

Leader of the Opposition
- In office 14 December 1955 – 18 January 1963
- Monarch: Elizabeth II
- Prime Minister: Anthony Eden; Harold Macmillan
- Deputy: Jim Griffiths; Aneurin Bevan; George Brown
- Preceded by: Herbert Morrison
- Succeeded by: George Brown

Leader of the Labour Party
- In office 14 December 1955 – 18 January 1963
- Deputy: Jim Griffiths; Aneurin Bevan; George Brown
- Preceded by: Clement Attlee (Note: Herbert Morrison acted from 7 December to 14 December 1955.)
- Succeeded by: Harold Wilson (Note: George Brown acted from 18 January to 14 February 1963)

Shadow Chancellor of the Exchequer
- In office 26 October 1951 – 14 December 1955
- Leader: Clement Attlee
- Preceded by: Rab Butler
- Succeeded by: Harold Wilson

Chancellor of the Exchequer
- In office 19 October 1950 – 26 October 1951
- Prime Minister: Clement Attlee
- Preceded by: Stafford Cripps
- Succeeded by: Rab Butler

Minister for Economic Affairs
- In office 28 February 1950 – 19 October 1950
- Prime Minister: Clement Attlee
- Preceded by: Stafford Cripps
- Succeeded by: Arthur Salter

Minister of Fuel and Power
- In office 7 October 1947 – 28 February 1950
- Prime Minister: Clement Attlee
- Preceded by: Manny Shinwell
- Succeeded by: Philip Noel-Baker

Parliamentary Secretary to the Ministry of Fuel and Power
- In office 10 May 1946 – 7 October 1947
- Prime Minister: Clement Attlee
- Preceded by: William Foster
- Succeeded by: Alfred Robens

Member of Parliament for Leeds South
- In office 5 July 1945 – 18 January 1963
- Preceded by: Henry Charleton
- Succeeded by: Merlyn Rees

Personal details
- Born: Hugh Todd Naylor Gaitskell; 9 April 1906 London, England
- Died: 18 January 1963 (aged 56) London, England
- Resting place: St John-at-Hampstead, London
- Party: Labour
- Spouse: Anna Dora Creditor (m. 1937)
- Children: 2
- Education: New College, Oxford

Hugh Todd Naylor Gaitskell (9 April 1906 – 18 January 1963) was a British politician who was Leader of the Labour Party and Leader of the Opposition from 1955 until his death in 1963. An economics lecturer and wartime civil servant, he was elected to Parliament in 1945 and held office in Clement Attlee's governments, notably as Minister of Fuel and Power following the bitter winter of 1946–47, and eventually joining the Cabinet as Chancellor of the Exchequer. Facing the need to increase military spending in 1951 due to the Korean War, he imposed National Health Service charges on dentures and spectacles, prompting the leading left-winger Aneurin Bevan to resign from the Cabinet.

The perceived similarity in his outlook to that of his Conservative Party counterpart Rab Butler was dubbed "Butskellism", initially a satirical term blending their names, and was one aspect of the post-war consensus through which the major parties largely agreed on the main points of domestic and foreign policy until the 1970s. With Labour in opposition from 1951, Gaitskell won bitter leadership battles with Bevan and his supporters to become the Leader of the Labour Party and Leader of the Opposition in 1955. In 1956 he opposed the Eden government's use of military force at Suez. Against a backdrop of a booming economy he led Labour to its third successive defeat at the 1959 general election.

In the late 1950s, in the teeth of opposition from the major trade unions, he attempted in vain to remove Clause IV of the Labour Party Constitution, which committed Labour to nationalisation of all the means of production. He did not reject public ownership altogether, but also emphasised the ethical goals of liberty, social welfare and above all equality, and argued that they could be achieved by fiscal and social policies within a mixed economy. His revisionist views, on the right wing of the Labour Party, were often called Gaitskellism and influenced the later New Labour philosophy.

Despite this setback, Gaitskell reversed an attempt to adopt unilateral nuclear disarmament as Labour Party policy, and opposed Prime Minister Harold Macmillan's attempt to lead the UK into the European Common Market. He died suddenly in 1963, when he appeared to be on the verge of leading Labour back into power and becoming the next Prime Minister.

== Early life ==
Hugh Gaitskell was born in Kensington, London, the third and youngest child of Arthur Gaitskell (1869–1915), of the Indian Civil Service, and Adelaide Mary, née Jamieson (died 1956), whose father, George Jamieson, was consul-general in Shanghai and prior to that had been Judge of the British Supreme Court for China and Japan. He was known as "Sam" as a child. The Gaitskells had a long family connection with the Indian Army, and he spent his childhood in Burma. After his father's death, his mother soon remarried and returned to Burma, leaving him at boarding school.

Gaitskell was educated at the Dragon School from 1912 to 1919, where he was a friend of the future poet John Betjeman. He then attended Winchester College from 1919 to 1924.

He attended New College, Oxford, from 1924 to 1927. Studying under G. D. H. Cole, Gaitskell became a socialist and wrote a long essay on Chartism, arguing that the working class needed middle class leadership. Gaitskell's first political involvement came about as a result of the General Strike of 1926. Most students supported the government and many volunteered for civil defence duties, or helped to run essential services. Gaitskell, unusually, supported the strikers and acted as a driver for people like his Oxford contemporary Evan Durbin and Cole's wife Margaret, who made speeches and delivered the trade union newspaper British Worker. After the collapse of the General Strike, Gaitskell spent another six months raising funds for the miners, whose dispute (technically a lockout rather than a strike) did not end until November. He graduated with a first-class degree in Philosophy, Politics and Economics in 1927.

== Academic and early political career ==
In 1927–28 Gaitskell lectured in economics for the Workers' Educational Association to miners in Nottinghamshire. His essay on Chartism was published as a WEA booklet in 1928. This was his first experience of interaction with the working class. Gaitskell eventually came to oppose both Cole's Guild socialism and Syndicalism and to feel that the General Strike had been the last failed spasm of a strategy – attempting to seize power through direct trade union action – which had already been tried in the abortive Triple Alliance Strike of 1921. It is unclear whether Gaitskell was ever sympathetic to Oswald Mosley, then seen as a future leader of the Labour Party. Gaitskell's wife later insisted that he never had been, but Margaret Cole, Evan Durbin's wife and Noel Hall believed that he was, although as an opponent of factional splits he was not tempted to join Mosley's New Party in 1931.

Gaitskell helped to run the New Fabian Research Bureau, set up by G. D. H. Cole in March 1931. He was selected as Labour candidate for Chatham in autumn 1932. Gaitskell moved to University College London in the early 1930s at the invitation of Noel Hall. In 1934 he joined the XYZ Club, a club for Labour financial experts (e.g. Hugh Dalton, of whom he became a protégé, Douglas Jay and Evan Durbin) and City people such as the economist Nicholas Davenport. Dalton and Gaitskell were often referred to as "Big Hugh and Little Hugh" over the next fifteen years.

In 1934 Gaitskell was in Vienna on a Rockefeller scholarship. He was attached to the University of Vienna for the 1933–34 academic year and witnessed first-hand the political suppression of the social democratic workers movement by the conservative Engelbert Dollfuss's government in February 1934. He sheltered activist and journalist Ilse Barea-Kulcsar when she was threatened with arrest. His experiences in Vienna made a lasting impression, making him profoundly hostile to conservatism but also making him reject as futile the Marxian outlook of many European social democrats. This placed him in the socialist revisionist camp.

At the 1935 general election, he stood unsuccessfully as the Labour Party candidate for Chatham. Gaitskell helped to draft "Labour's Immediate Programme" in 1937. This had a strong emphasis on planning, although not as much as his mentor Dalton would have liked, with no plans for the nationalisation of banks or the steel industry. He also drafted documents which would have been used in the election due in 1939–40. Dalton helped him to be selected as candidate for South Leeds in 1937, and had it not been for the war, he would very likely have become an MP by 1940.

Gaitskell became head of the Department of Political Economy at UCL when Hall was appointed Director of the National Institute of Economic and Social Research in 1938, jointly with Paul Rosenstein-Rodan. He also became a University Reader. He opposed the appeasement of Nazi Germany and supported rearmament.

== Personal life ==
According to Michael Bloch, Gaitskell enjoyed a number of same-sex relationships while at Oxford, including with John Betjeman, and in the 1930s in Vienna, with John Gunther.

Whilst a WEA lecturer in the late 1920s Gaitskell lived for a time with a local woman in Nottinghamshire. This is thought to have been his first adult relationship. Until the early 1930s he rejected marriage as a "bourgeois convention".

By the mid-1930s Gaitskell had formed a close relationship with a married woman, Dora Frost (née Creditor), who came out to join him in Vienna for the latter part of his stay there. Adultery still carried such stigma that she thought it best not to help him during his Parliamentary campaign in Chatham in 1935. After her divorce, hard to obtain prior to the passage of the Matrimonial Causes Act 1937, they were eventually married on 9 April 1937, Gaitskell's thirty-first birthday, with Evan Durbin as best man. Dora had a son, Raymond Frost (b 1925), from her first marriage. The Gaitskells had two daughters: Julia, born in 1939, and Cressida, born in 1942. Dora Gaitskell became a Labour life peer a year after her husband's death and died in 1989.

Gaitskell had a long-term affair in the 1950s with the socialite Ann Fleming, the wife of the writer Ian Fleming. She wrote to Evelyn Waugh about a dinner party in 1958 in which Gaitskell and friends from Oxford days "held hands and recited verse because in early life they had loved each other in the same set", until the arrival of her husband "silenced the eminent homos", who "did not seem too pleased." Woodrow Wyatt wrote that "there was a scintilla of platonic homosexuality in [Gaitskell's] affection for Tony [Crosland]".

In private he was humorous and fun-loving, with a love of ballroom dancing. This contrasted with his stern public image. He was a member of the Steering Committee of the Bilderberg Group.

== Wartime civil servant and election to Parliament ==
During the Second World War, from the formation of Churchill's coalition government in May 1940 Gaitskell worked with Noel Hall and Hugh Dalton as a senior civil servant for the Ministry of Economic Warfare, giving him experience of government. As Dalton's Private Secretary Gaitskell was more of a Chef de Cabinet and trusted adviser. Observers watched Gaitskell blossom and enjoy exercising power. Dalton liked to shout at his subordinates; Gaitskell sometimes shouted back. Along with Dalton, Gaitskell was moved to the Board of Trade in February 1942, where for the first time he came into contact with the leaders of the miners' unions, who were later to support him in his struggles against Aneurin Bevan in the 1950s. For his service, he was appointed Commander of the Order of the British Empire in 1945.

In March 1945 Gaitskell suffered a coronary thrombosis brought on by overwork. Advised to rest, he considered withdrawing from his parliamentary candidacy in Leeds, but he was popular with his constituency workers and they offered to campaign for him even if he was unable to do so. He was also approached to return to UCL as a Professor after the war, but he disliked the constant state of flux of academic economics and the increasing emphasis on mathematics, a subject of which he had little knowledge. By now he found himself more drawn to public life.

Gaitskell was elected Labour Member of Parliament (MP) for Leeds South in the Labour landslide victory of 1945. Despite his illness, as a protégé of Dalton he was seriously considered for immediate appointment as a junior minister, Parliamentary Under-Secretary at the Board of Trade (under Stafford Cripps). This would have been a rare honour since 263 of the 393 Labour MPs in 1945 were newly elected, but it did not take place.

As a backbencher he spoke in debates in support of Dalton's nationalisation of the Bank of England, which eventually received Royal Assent on 14 February 1946. Dalton was trying to score party points by claiming that he was reasserting political control over the City of London, a far-fetched claim as the Bank was already under political control. Although some Conservative MPs spoke against the measure it was not opposed by Churchill, then Leader of the Opposition, who had had an ambivalent view of the Bank since his own time as chancellor in the 1920s.

== Ministry of Fuel and Power ==
Gaitskell was given his first ministerial appointment in May 1946 as Parliamentary Under-Secretary for Fuel and Power, serving under Emmanuel "Manny" Shinwell. The job had initially been earmarked for Harold Wilson, with Gaitskell pencilled in to succeed Wilson as Parliamentary Under-Secretary at the Ministry of Works. Gaitskell believed that Shinwell, who was suspicious of middle class intellectual socialists, may have picked him in preference to Wilson because the latter was already an expert on the mining industry.

Gaitskell played an important role steering the Coal Nationalisation Bill through the House of Commons, bearing the brunt of the committee stage and winding up the final debate. In the fuel crisis of February 1947 Shinwell, who had ignored Gaitskell's warnings, had to ask the Cabinet for permission to shut down power stations; Gaitskell was put on and ran the key committee which decided where coal should be sent. In 1947 he once again played an important role steering electricity nationalisation through the House of Commons, winding up the debate on the second reading.

On 7 October 1947 Gaitskell was promoted to Minister of Fuel and Power in Shinwell's place. He was not made a member of the Cabinet, although he often attended Cabinet meetings when his input was required. He had committed a gaffe during the municipal election campaign in Hastings earlier that year, when he recommended that people save fuel by taking fewer baths, adding that he had never taken all that many himself; in the House of Commons in late October Churchill joked that it was no wonder that the Government were "in bad odour" and asked the Speaker if he might be permitted to describe Labour ministers as "lousey", normally an unparliamentary expression, as it would be a simple statement of fact. Gaitskell made himself very unpopular by abolishing the basic petrol ration for private motorists, but encouraged the building of oil refineries, a move little-noticed at the time which would have important repercussions for the future.

== Treasury matters ==
=== Devaluation ===
In early July 1949 Gaitskell shared Chancellor of the Exchequer Stafford Cripps' worries that Treasury officials were too "liberal" and too reluctant to implement socialist measures. Like Cripps and Dalton, Gaitskell was a devotee of cheap money. Not only were higher interest rates seen as associated with the Gold standard and the deflationary policies of the 1920s, but the policy preference in the 1940s was for quantitative controls (e.g. exchange controls in finance, or rationing of physical goods) rather than the price mechanism. Interest rates, which had been cut to low levels in the 1930s, did not begin to be used as an instrument of policy again until after the Conservatives returned to power in 1952.

Cripps was seriously unwell and had to go to Switzerland to convalesce on 18 July; Attlee announced that he was taking over Cripps' responsibilities with three young, financially able, ministers to advise him. Gaitskell soon emerged as the leader of the group, the others being Harold Wilson, President of the Board of Trade, and Douglas Jay, Economic Secretary to the Treasury. All three had been wartime civil servants.

The young ministers were now in favour of devaluation of the Pound sterling, currently at $4.03. Jay lunched with Gaitskell on 20 July 1949, and they agreed that this would help to reverse the drain of capital out of the UK, that the US was unlikely to help with further loans or gifts of dollars, that Commonwealth countries needed to be encouraged to buy British goods rather than goods priced in dollars, that there was potential to increase exports to dollar areas, and that if nothing was done there was a risk of reserves running low and a collapse in sterling putting the UK at the mercy of the US. On 21 July Gaitskell, Jay and Wilson met the Prime Minister to tell him that devaluation was inevitable as reserves were still dropping. On 29 July, the Cabinet agreed in principle to devalue, having also been given the same advice in another memo from senior civil servants, Sir Edward Bridges (Permanent Secretary to the Treasury) and the two Treasury Second Secretaries (Robert Hall and Sir Edwin Plowden).

Cripps returned to London on 18 August to be greeted by two memoranda from Gaitskell. One was a short paper advising a general election that autumn after devaluation. Cripps did indeed make that recommendation to Attlee, but it was rejected. The second paper was ten pages on devaluation, which in Edmund Dell's view it is unlikely he actually read. Gaitskell argued that with employment high, the balance of payments in decent shape and inflation a containable problem, the only problem was shortage of dollars, with US opinion very reluctant to help the UK any more. He recommended spending cuts to keep inflation under control – but did not say how much. He also recommended that sterling initially float within a band of $2.80–$2.60, a proposal discussed with Hall and Plowden. He recommended devaluation by 4 September, but rejected the idea that currencies become fully convertible – in the way that John Maynard Keynes had advocated at the Bretton Woods Conference – as this might prevent governments protecting full employment. Dell argues that Gaitskell's memo was full of the impatience of a young man at his elders clinging to office, but that on the other hand he himself had been slow to recognise the need for devaluation. Gaitskell and Wilson met with Attlee, Ernest Bevin and Cripps at Chequers on 19 August, and Bevin and Cripps agreed with some reluctance to devaluation. The decision was finally confirmed by the Cabinet on 9 August, although Cripps rejected Gaitskell's plan for a floating band. Devaluation (from $4.03 to $2.80) was announced on Sunday 18 September after a secret Cabinet meeting the day before. Many other countries followed suit, so it was mainly UK trade with dollar-using countries which was affected.

Gaitskell had initially been suspicious of devaluation because it was a price mechanism, but earned the admiration of Robert Hall over this crisis. He accepted the need for spending cuts to help make devaluation work and keep to keep the Americans happy, and thought former chancellor Dalton "rather dishonest" for arguing at the Economic Policy Committee that cuts were not necessary. Cripps, who had implied in his devaluation broadcast that devaluation was an alternative to cuts, threatened to resign unless cuts of £300m were agreed; Aneurin Bevan (Minister of Health) in turn threatened to resign as did A.V. Alexander (Minister of Defence). In the event most of the cuts were to future spending plans except for Bevan's housing budget.

=== Minister for Economic Affairs ===
In January 1950 Gaitskell submitted a paper called "Control and Liberalisation" to the Economic Policy Committee, which he was sometimes invited to attend. He wrote that "On 'liberalisation' we have gone about far enough. But we have done it for political reasons – US and Europe". He was opposed to the convertibility of currencies and non-discrimination between trading partners, both policies which the US favoured. Britain still preferred to encourage trade in pounds sterling within the Commonwealth, and Gaitskell wanted to preserve Britain's ability to avoid downturns like the US downturn of 1948–9, which Britain had largely escaped because of devaluation.

In the February 1950 General Election the Government were re-elected with a tiny majority. In the ensuing reshuffle Gaitskell was appointed Minister for Economic Affairs, effectively Deputy Chancellor but still outside the Cabinet. He was made a full member of the Economic Policy Committee. Soon after his promotion he recorded that he often had to stiffen up Cripps, who was not as tough as his public image would suggest, to make sure he did not make too many concessions in negotiations with colleagues.

The level of spending on the new NHS was already running far in excess of predictions. In November 1949, with the high level of public spending already a problem and under pressure from Cripps, Bevan had pushed an act through Parliament granting the government the power to impose prescription charges, although they were not brought in just yet (Cripps had wanted 1 shilling per prescription, but Bevan had not agreed to this). In the 1949–50 financial year Cripps had allowed £90m of extra health service spending ("supplementaries"). Early in 1950 Cripps backed off from a plan to introduce further charges, this time on false teeth and spectacles, after Bevan threatened to resign, but Gaitskell was put on a committee to monitor Bevan's agreement to a ceiling on NHS spending. The Treasury wanted health spending capped at £350m per annum, although it was willing to accept £392m for 1950–1.

There was already friction between Gaitskell and Bevan. At one meeting, probably 28 June 1950, Bevan had been about to walk out of the room until Attlee called him back. Bevan stopped attending Cripps' Thursday night dinners for economics ministers. After one of those dinners Bevan's old ally John Strachey, now Minister of Food, rebuked him for attacking Gaitskell, whom he thought "one of the really considerable men of the Government", a suggestion to which Bevan responded with derision, calling him "nothing, nothing, nothing".

=== Rearmament and European Payments Union ===
By the second half of 1950 the western powers were caught up in a major rearmament drive. The outbreak of the Korean War in June 1950 at first threatened US loss of South Korea (which was seen as vital for the defence of Japan), and by the autumn threatened to escalate into a general war between the US and Communist China. There were also very real worries that the Soviets might invade western Europe (which was unarmed, with strong communist influence in many countries) and that the US would not help Britain if she did not help herself. The crushing of democracy in Czechoslovakia had been as recent as 1948. In August 1950 the British defence budget was hiked from £2.3bn to £3.6bn (a total over a three-year period); at this stage it had appeared that the US would be willing to help foot the bill.

In September 1950 inflationary pressure was worsened when the TUC voted to end the existing two-year wage freeze, although there was no wage explosion just yet. It was difficult for the Treasury to take tough measures given the government's small majority and the likelihood of another election soon.

Gaitskell thought balance of payments problems should be solved not by realignments of currencies but by asking surplus countries like the US and Belgium to inflate their economies (so they would import more). He was attacked for this by the US Secretary of the Treasury John Wesley Snyder and Camille Gutt (former Belgian finance minister and now managing director of the IMF). Dell argues that Gaitskell did not realise that other countries had their own domestic problems. In September 1950, with Britain's balance of payments now in surplus, Gaitskell negotiated British membership of the European Payments Union, meaning that instead of bilateral clearing, European currencies were to be convertible against one another even if not against the US dollar. Previously dollars had been needed for trade within Europe. Until then Gaitskell had shared concerns that some countries might stay in permanent deficit and thus effectively use their neighbours for free borrowing, or conversely that Belgium's surplus would enable her to suck gold and dollars from Britain. The EPU lasted until sterling was made convertible in 1958.

Although Gaitskell had until recently thought Bevan an inevitable future leader for the Labour Party, by the 1950 Party Conference (2 October) The Daily Telegraph's political correspondent guessed correctly that he and Gaitskell were already fighting a proxy battle for the future leadership.

=== Promotion to the Chancellorship ===
Cripps, whose health was still failing, had notified Attlee of his intention to resign as Chancellor of the Exchequer on 26 April 1950. He attempted to resign in the summer but was dissuaded by Gaitskell and Plowden because of the outbreak of the Korean War. He instead went on a long holiday, leaving Gaitskell in charge.

It was now becoming clear that the US Congress was reluctant to help Britain meet the cost of rearmament. Gaitskell visited Washington in October 1950, his first visit there, just before becoming Chancellor. He warned that the terms of trade were shifting against Britain, and of the costs of rearmament.

In October 1950 Cripps finally resigned as Chancellor of the Exchequer. Dalton proposed Gaitskell for the vacancy. Sir Edward Bridges wanted Herbert Morrison, a political heavyweight; Morrison had been an early advocate of devaluation but did not regard himself as qualified. Gaitskell was appointed at the young age of 44, especially unusual as most of Attlee's Cabinet were in their sixties or older. He became the Chancellor with the shortest Parliamentary apprenticeship since Pitt the Younger in 1782. As Chancellor of the Exchequer he retained the same control over economic planning which Cripps had had. Both Cripps and Gaitskell insisted that Gaitskell be listed after Attlee, Bevin and Morrison in the official Cabinet pecking order.

Bevan was furious at Gaitskell being promoted over him, even though, as Gaitskell correctly guessed in his diary, he probably did not want the job himself. Gaitskell recorded that Bevan often asserted that Cripps had promised him the Exchequer.

The US Chiefs of Staff wanted an even greater increase in the British armaments budget to £6bn over three years, a plan backed by the British Chiefs of Staff and urged on Prime Minister Attlee on his visit to the US in Dec 1950. On his return from Washington Attlee told the House of Commons on 29 January 1951 that the defence budget was to be hiked to £4.7bn over the next three-year period, including a fourfold increase in munitions production. The defence budget was to increase from 8% to 14% of GNP, a proportion exceeded only by the US amongst NATO members. At the peak 2.5m people, 11% of the workforce, would be engaged in defence work.

== Chancellor of the Exchequer, 1950–51 ==
=== Economic philosophy ===
On his appointment, Gaitskell told William Armstrong, his Principal Private Secretary, that the main job over next few years would be the redistribution of wealth.

Rab Butler and Samuel Brittan, both writing in the early 1970s, commented that Gaitskell was the most technically qualified chancellor of the 20th century up until that date. However, Dell comments that he often went into excessive detail, including personally overseeing economic forecasts, and held excessively long meetings. This may have been from a love of micro-management or because, as an advocate of controls and planning, he was suspicious of treasury officials, whom he thought excessively inclined to free market mechanisms.

In December 1950, Gaitskell rejected the advice of Kim Cobbold (Governor of the Bank of England) and Hall that interest rates be raised, calling such a policy "completely antiquated".

=== Cost of rearmament ===
Marshall Aid, which had totalled $3.1bn over previous three years, ended officially on 1 January 1951, although in practice it had ended six weeks earlier. It was held that the balance of payments was now strong enough for it no longer to be necessary. Harold Wilson (President of the Board of Trade) and George Strauss (Minister of Supply) warned Gaitskell that the burden of rearmament was too much for the shortage of raw materials and manufacturing capacity, but Gaitskell ignored them as they were friends of Bevan. On 27 January 1951 Bevan was reshuffled to the Ministry of Labour with Health, now under Hilary Marquand, downgraded to a non-Cabinet appointment. Gaitskell welcomed the changes as reducing an obstacle to economies in health spending.

Gaitskell still favoured discrimination in favour of sterling trade and was opposed to sterling convertibility but was now a lot more pro-American since his October 1950 visit to Washington. By February 1951 he was strongly critical of anti-Americanism in cabinet.

Bevan's Commons speech on 15 February 1951 defended the extra £4.7bn on armaments, although most of it was a warning not to rearm too fast and that communism would be defeated through democratic socialism and not through arms. The following day Gaitskell recorded his regret that for all Bevan's brilliance in oratory he should be "a difficult team worker, and some would say even worse – a thoroughly unreliable and disloyal colleague."

=== Budget ===
Gaitskell made the controversial decision to introduce charges for prescription glasses and dentures on the National Health Service in his spring 1951 budget. The Cabinet had agreed in principle in February 1951 to charges on teeth and spectacles. For 1951-2 Bevan was demanding £422m of health spending, whereas Gaitskell was willing to allow £400m. Gaitskell wanted to pass on half the cost of false teeth and spectacles, to bring in £13m in 1951-2 and £23m in a full year. Children, the poor and the sick were to be exempt. On 9 March Ernest Bevin was moved from the Foreign Office, dying a month later. Bevan, who had hoped to succeed him, was passed over for promotion to a major job for the second time in six months. By this point other ministers felt that Bevan was looking for an issue on which to resign, and that it was pointless making too many concessions as he needed to be made to appear to be in the wrong.

In addition, Purchase Tax was increased from 33% to 66% on certain luxury items such as cars, television sets and domestic appliances, while entertainment tax was increased on cinema tickets. At the same time, however, taxation on profits was raised and pensions increased to compensate pensioners for a rise in the cost of living, while the allowances for dependent children payable to widows, the unemployed and the sick, together with marriage and child allowances, were also increased. In addition a number of small items were removed from purchase tax, and the amount of earnings allowed without affecting the state pension was increased from 20 shillings (£1) to 40 shillings (£2) a week. Besides taxing the better off and protecting pensions, Gaitskell actually increased NHS spending. The budget increased defence spending by £500m to £1.5bn for 1951–2, helped by a surplus inherited from Cripps and optimistic growth forecasts. Plans to introduce capital-gains tax were postponed until 1952.

Prime Minister Attlee's initial reaction to the draft budget was that there were not likely to be many votes in it. Gaitskell replied that he could not expect votes in a rearmament year. Ernest Bevin did not like the idea of health charges and tried in vain to negotiate a compromise. Education Minister George Tomlinson suggested a repetition of the previous year's formula, a spending ceiling of £400m. Gaitskell was prepared to offer a delay in the introduction of charges but rejected the Tomlinson formula despite Attlee's urgings, since the ceiling could not be achieved without charges. Attlee went into hospital to be treated for a duodenal ulcer on 21 March. From his sickbed he wrote what Kenneth O. Morgan calls a "remarkably vacuous letter", which "dealt with none of the substantive points at issue". At a Cabinet meeting on 22 March Gaitskell was dissuaded from his original intention to insist on prescription charges since they might fall heavily on the genuinely sick.

=== Bevan's resignation ===
Gaitskell and Attlee warned of risks that the rearmament programme might not be fully implemented. Gaitskell warned the Economic Policy Committee (3 April 1951) of the shortage of machine tools, and stated that some could be imported from the US but that this would weaken the balance of payments.

A very angry Bevan saw the charges as a blow to the principle of a free health service, telling a heckler while he was making a speech in Bermondsey (3 April 1951) that he would resign rather than accept health charges. Gaitskell, besides the obvious need for a new Chancellor to assert his authority, saw this as a deliberate attempt to bounce the Cabinet publicly, telling Dalton that Bevan's "influence was very much exaggerated" and that he might split the Labour Party as Lloyd George had the Liberals.

In two long Cabinet meetings on 9 April Bevan found himself supported only by Harold Wilson. Herbert Morrison, who was chairing the Cabinet whilst Attlee was being treated in hospital, again proposed a compromise that there be an agreed ceiling on public spending but no NHS charges. Gaitskell was determined that there would not be an open-ended commitment to welfare spending at the expense of economic investment or rearmament, and rejected Morrison's proposal. At the second meeting, Gaitskell threatened to resign, but quietly and without a public fuss, if he did not have the backing of the Cabinet; the resignation of the Chancellor on the eve of the budget would have caused a political crisis. Douglas Jay and others attempted in vain to persuade Gaitskell to compromise, but he refused, arguing that two members of the Cabinet should not be allowed to dictate to eighteen, although he agreed not to specify just yet the date at which the charges would come into effect. A final attempt by Attlee to negotiate a compromise from his sickbed (10 April) came to nothing. The affair brought Gaitskell close to physical and emotional collapse.

Gaitskell won the admiration of Treasury officials for his stance: on the morning of the budget Sir Edward Bridges came to tell him of the respect he had earned in the department and that it was "the best day we have had in the Treasury for ten years". Gaitskell recorded that Bridges, Plowden, Leslie (Head of Information) and Armstrong were all urging him to stand firm and that he was "overcome with emotion" at Armstrong's words.

Gaitskell's budget was praised at the time. His predecessor Stafford Cripps wrote to him praising him for not giving in to "political expediency", whilst he was supported in public by two younger MPs later to be staunch allies, Roy Jenkins and Anthony Crosland. After the budget Tony Benn, who was on the right of the Labour Party at that time, recorded the atmosphere at the party meeting (i.e. a meeting of Labour MPs) on 11 April as "sheer relief" that it had not been worse; the Parliamentary Labour Party (PLP) strongly supported the budget. However, Bevan soon rejected Gaitskell's proposed compromise that it be announced that the health charges were not to be permanent as "a bromide". Bevan's ally Michael Foot wrote an editorial in Tribune comparing Gaitskell to Philip Snowden (the Chancellor whose cuts in 1931 had brought down the Second Labour Government, after which he and other leading members of the Cabinet entered into the Tory-dominated National Government). Bevan resigned on 21 April, as did Harold Wilson and John Freeman.

Gaitskell defended his budget at the party meeting on 24 April. He said it was still too early to tell if the rearmament programme was actually achievable. Benn commented after the meeting on how Gaitskell's greatness arose from his combination of "intellectual ability and political forcefulness". Bevan then made an angry speech which did not impress many of the PLP.

=== Analysis ===
Edmund Dell argues that neither Bevan nor Gaitskell emerge with much credit from the affair. "Gaitskell was obsessed by Bevan and by the need to establish his authority over him". Charges on false teeth and spectacles were "insignificant" in the context of the greater budget and "financially were neither here nor there" ... but Bevan was "impatient and arrogant and noisy and apparently intent on exhausting the tolerance of his cabinet colleagues". Gaitskell agreed to limit health charges to three years (subject to Parliament voting to extend them), made concessions on pensions to the Trade Union Group of MPs, and a diary entry suggests he was not happy about dividend constraints – yet he was not prepared to make significant concessions to Bevan. However, Dell argues that all chancellors have to make sticking points or they would have to give in to everybody. Gaitskell saw himself as defending the country and wanted to prove Labour a "responsible party of government", but the public were not yet aware of the looming inflation problem. Gaitskell told George Brown in 1960: "It was a battle between us for power – he knew it and so did I".

John Campbell agrees that Bevan may have been partly right that Gaitskell, abetted by Morrison, was deliberately trying to drive him out of the Cabinet. Gaitskell believed that Labour had to be seen to govern with fiscal responsibility, telling Dalton on 4 May 1951 that he and Bevan were engaged in a battle for the soul of the Labour Party, and that if Bevan won Labour would be out for many years (although, ironically, Gaitskell won but they were out of power for many years anyway). Had Attlee not been sick, he might have been able to patch up a compromise.

Historian Brian Brivati believes that the importance of the charges was "irrelevant" to the huge cost of rearmament, which damaged Britain's recovery in the years which followed by absorbing earnings from exports.

=== Aftermath ===
A £300m surplus in the British balance of payments in 1950 turned into a £400m deficit in 1951, the most sudden reversal on record up until that time. This was caused partly by businesses switching to rearmament rather than generating exports. The other reason was a deterioration in the terms of trade: higher oil prices after the Iranian oil crisis caused an outflow of dollars, whilst prices of wool, tin and rubber fell so the rest of the sterling area was not earning so many dollars from exports. By the second half of 1951 the overseas sterling area was importing from North America at double the 1950 rate. By 1951 inflation was beginning to increase, the government budget surplus had disappeared, and in another sign of an overheating economy unemployment was down to 1945 levels. By the second half of 1951 Gaitskell was worried about the political effect of the higher cost of living, but the Financial Times and The Economist accused him of using higher prices to choke off consumption and free up resources for rearmament instead of consumer goods production.

Gaitskell again rejected Treasury advice to raise interest rates to cool the economy in June, July and August 1951. He argued that higher interest rates would be perceived as generating profits for the banks, which would not sit well with trade unions, and he was only prepared to consider demanding that the banks restrict credit. Gaitskell (diary 10 August 1951) stated that he and Morrison thought that Attlee had been too weak in dealing with Bevan. By August–September 1951 the Treasury were taken by surprise by a full-on sterling crisis, which they passed on to the incoming Conservative Government. Sterling was trading unofficially at $2.40, below the official rate of $2.80.

Gaitskell visited Washington in the autumn of 1951, where he thought US Treasury Secretary John Wesley Snyder "a pretty small-minded, small town, semi-isolationist". A committee was formed, containing Plowden and Averell Harriman, to investigate the way in which US rearmament was absorbing and pushing up the prices of world raw materials. Gaitskell was horrified by Attlee's calling an election (19 September 1951) when he and Morrison were in North America. If Attlee had held on for another six or nine months Labour might have won. Labour lost the October 1951 General Election despite getting more votes than the Conservatives. Whilst the Bevanites blamed defeat on Morrison's policy of "consolidation", the right blamed Bevan for causing a split. Nobody imagined Labour would be out of power for more than a few years, and Attlee expected to be Prime Minister again by 1953.

When the Conservatives returned to power, the new chancellor Rab Butler would get the balance of payments back into surplus in 1952 by cutting overseas spending, a measure which Dell suggests Gaitskell had not wanted to irritate the Americans by taking. In his memoirs (Art of the Possible, p. 163) Butler later called him "a political mouse who, confronted with a gigantic deterioration in the balance of payments, responded by cutting a sliver off the cheese ration". After the Conservatives cut the armament plans in 1952 Crosland told people that Gaitskell had made him look like "a complete idiot" for supporting the budget in public. However, even by the end of 1951 there was less likelihood of the Korean War turning into a general war (the front line had stabilised, with the US administration being clear that they did not wish to escalate hostilities against China), so any government might have pared back defence spending in 1952.

== Opposition: the Bevanite split 1951–55 ==
=== 1951–52 ===
In opposition, Gaitskell's house at Frognal Gardens, Hampstead became a centre for political intrigue. At first Herbert Morrison still seemed likely to succeed Attlee as leader. This period was characterised by factional infighting between the 'Bevanite' left of the Labour party led by Aneurin Bevan, whose strength lay mainly in the constituency Labour Parties ("CLP"s) and the 'Gaitskellite' right who had the upper hand in the Parliamentary Party (Labour MPs – known collectively as the "PLP").

In February 1952 Bevan led a rebellion of 56 other Labour MPs to vote against the Conservatives' defence spending plans (the official Labour position was to abstain). Dalton recorded (11 March) that Gaitskell was, behind the scenes, keen for a showdown with Bevan. At the party meeting Bevan refused to agree to toe the party line, but the issue was defused by a conciliatory motion by the centrist "Keep Calm" group, passed against the wishes of the platform. Bevan at this time thought that Gaitskell should be reduced to "a junior clerk" in the next Labour Government. On 1 August 1952, when Gaitskell had succeeded in putting Churchill (Prime Minister at the time) on the ropes in a House of Commons debate, Bevan intervened to attack Gaitskell, an event greeted with Tory relief and according to Crossman "icy silence" on the Labour benches.

Dalton (30 September 1952) thought the Morecambe Party Conference "the worst ... for bad temper and general hatred, since 1926" whilst Michael Foot thought it "rowdy, convulsive, vulgar, splenetic". A series of left-wing motions were passed. Bevanites took over the constituency section of Labour's National Executive Committee (the "NEC"): Bevan, Barbara Castle, Tom Driberg, Ian Mikardo and Harold Wilson took the top five places with Crossman seventh. Veteran right-wingers such as Herbert Morrison and Hugh Dalton were voted off, with Jim Griffiths in sixth place the only member of the Old Guard to survive; Shinwell, who as Minister of Defence was seen as responsible for the rearmament programme, had been voted off the previous year.

In a speech at Stalybridge (5 October 1952) Gaitskell alleged that "about one-sixth" of the constituency delegates "appeared to be Communist or Communist-inspired" and attacked "the stream of grossly misleading propaganda with poisonous innuendos and malicious attacks on Attlee, Morrison and the rest of us" published in Tribune. He claimed that Labour was threatened by "mob rule" got up by "frustrated journalists" (a number of Bevanites, including Michael Foot and Tom Driberg, were journalists). He received strong backing from the TGWU whose block vote was of immense importance at the Labour Conference and which was able to exert pressure on its sponsored MPs to toe the party line.

Attlee then gave a speech at the newly built Royal Festival Hall demanding an end to groups within the party. After the PLP voted 188–51 to ban such groups Bevan insisted, over the wishes of Foot and Crossman, that the Bevanite group be disbanded. The Shadow Cabinet elections (elected by Labour MPs when the party was in opposition) were topped by Jim Griffiths and Chuter Ede. Gaitskell was in third place with 179 votes. Bevan, who had just challenged Morrison unsuccessfully for the Deputy Leadership, scraped on in twelfth and last place with 108 votes.

=== 1953–54 ===
Tony Benn wrote of Gaitskell (24 September 1953) "he is intellectually arrogant, obstinate and patronising. I respect – but cannot quite admire – him".

Relations between Bevan and Gaitskell continued to be acrimonious. On one occasion in 1953, when Gaitskell called for unity at a Shadow Cabinet meeting, Bevan was observed to give him "a glare of concentrated hatred" and declared: "You're too young in the movement to know what you're talking about". Bevan resigned from the Shadow Cabinet in April 1954 over Labour's support for the setting-up of SEATO.

Bevan stood against Gaitskell for Party Treasurer, knowing he would likely lose but hoping to discredit union bosses Arthur Deakin and Tom Williamson in the eyes of rank-and-file trade union members. In the event even Sam Watson, leader of Bevan's own miners' union, supported Gaitskell. Gaitskell won by 4.3 million votes to 2 million. Bevan gave a speech to the Tribune party at the conference, declaring that the Labour Leader needed to be a "desiccated calculating machine". He was widely and probably wrongly thought to be referring to Gaitskell, to whom the label stuck. In fact it may well have been aimed at Attlee who had the previous day warned against "emotionalism" whilst privately Bevan thought that Gaitskell was highly emotional and, as he had shown in 1951, "couldn't count". The Treasurership election was seen as particularly important as it was lining up a successor to Attlee, whose retirement was clearly fairly imminent.

=== 1955 ===
In March 1955 Bevan, who had given no hint of disagreement with party policy at the party meeting a few days earlier, now challenged Attlee in a House of Commons debate to demand terms for use of the new H-Bomb in return for Labour's support for the weapon. He and 62 other abstained in the vote, leading to demands from loyalists that the party whip be withdrawn from him as a preliminary to him being formally expelled from the Labour Party by the NEC.

Writing a few days later, Gaitskell claimed to have felt that "sooner or later [Bevan] would have to go, but I was not sure whether this was the right moment" (19 March). However, Gaitskell told an audience at Doncaster that Bevan had made "a direct challenge to the elected Leader of our Party" and accused him of not being a team player. At a party meeting a few days later (16 March) Bevan accused Gaitskell of having told a direct lie against him and declared that it was "those hatchet-faced men sitting on the platform" who were undermining the leadership. After a lukewarm summing up by Attlee the PLP voted by 114–112 to withdraw the whip from Bevan.

Gaitskell felt he had to follow the lead of the unions and pushed for Bevan's expulsion, telling Crossman (24 March) that Ian Mikardo was running a Bevanite organisation in the constituency parties to make Bevan leader. When Crossman interjected that Bevan "was only half wanting" to be leader, had not made any conspiracy against Attlee and was mainly concerned at voicing protests against Morrison and Gaitskell, the latter replied that "there are extraordinary parallels between Nye and Adolf Hitler. They are demagogues of exactly the same sort ... There are minor differences but what is striking is the resemblance". Summoned to appear before an NEC sub-committee, Bevan refused to be "cornered by Gaitskell". In the event Gaitskell intervened only once at the meeting, asking Bevan to give a pledge that he would not attack the leader – Bevan refused as it was "a trap". Bevan's apology for his rebellion over the H-Bomb was accepted. Gaitskell described the result (2 April) as "a stalemate ... my own position is no doubt weaker". Gaitskell thought the need to move against Bevan "dirty work" (April 1955).

The May 1955 General Election was the first since 1931 in which Labour's vote had not increased. In Tribune on 21 June 1955 Gaitskell poured scorn on the idea that more left-wing policies (or, as he put it, policies more similar to those of the Communist Party) would have won Labour more votes. Campbell argues that "history overwhelmingly supports" Gaitskell's argument that elections are won by appealing to the centre ground rather than to a party's core base, tempting as the latter strategy often is to parties in opposition.

At the Margate conference that autumn Gaitskell gave a stirring and well-received speech including an apparently unscripted passage stressing his own socialist credentials and arguing that nationalisation was still a "vital means" to achieving that end. Bevan was observed to be watching the speech "red-faced and furious" and complaining of Gaitskell's "sheer demagogy". In October 1955 Gaitskell was re-elected Party Treasurer by a wider margin over Bevan than the previous year.

The apparent congruence between Gaitskell's economic policies and those of his Conservative successor as chancellor Rab Butler, who had retained and extended NHS charges, was sometimes labelled "Butskellism" by the press. This view was not shared by Gaitskell himself, and after Butler's emergency "Pots and Pans" budget in October 1955, in which he reversed tax cuts made prior to the Conservatives' re-election at the general election earlier that year, he attacked him strongly for allegedly having misled the electorate. Gaitskell won further praise for his attacks on Butler.

== Party leader ==
Following the retirement of Attlee as leader in December 1955, Gaitskell stood for party leader against Bevan and the ageing Herbert Morrison. At that time (and until 1981) the Labour Party leader was elected solely by MPs. In a final effort to stave off an inevitable Gaitskell victory, Bevan proposed that he and Gaitskell both withdraw in Morrison's favour, but Gaitskell rejected the offer. Gaitskell comfortably defeated Bevan (Morrison came a poor third) in the party leadership contest. Chuter Ede described the leadership election as "the political funeral of two of the greatest publicity mongers I've ever known," adding that Gaitskell had never actively sought publicity.

Gaitskell told a friend that "The leadership came to me so early because Bevan threw it at me by his behaviour", a view shared by Attlee and Harold Wilson. Gaitskell was very inexperienced for a party leader by the standards of the time. He offered Bevan a public olive branch at the party meeting after the result, promising that he would "not be outdone in generosity" if Bevan accepted the vote. Bevan agreed to do so, wishing Gaitskell "higher office".

Brivati writes that Gaitskell's 1951–55 "political performance ... has not received the credit it deserves, for energy, for strategy and for sheer nerve".

== Leader of the Opposition, 1955–1963 ==
=== Suez ===
In 1956 the Egyptian ruler Colonel Gamal Abdel Nasser nationalised the Suez Canal Company, beginning the Suez Crisis. Gaitskell initially told the Prime Minister, Sir Anthony Eden, and the Chancellor of the Exchequer Harold Macmillan at a dinner with King Faisal II of Iraq on 26 July 1956, that they would have the support of public opinion for the use of military action against Nasser, but warned Eden that he must act quickly and would have to keep the Americans closely informed. Gaitskell denounced Nasser's action at 11am on 27 July in the House of Commons debate.

Gaitskell's position became more cautious during the summer, and he suggested the dispute with Egypt should be referred to the United Nations. His first speech on Suez (2 August 1956) attacked Nasser and was welcomed by many Conservatives, and implied that he would support the use of force, but in Brivati's view did not give enough emphasis to his stipulation that it be done through the United Nations. He had believed Eden's assurances that he had no intention of using force. In two letters to Eden sent on 3 and 10 August Gaitskell condemned Nasser, but warned that he would not support any action that violated the United Nations charter. In his letter of 10 August, Gaitskell wrote: "Lest there should be any doubt in your mind about my personal attitude, let me say that I could not regard an armed attack on Egypt by ourselves and the French as justified by anything which Nasser has done so far or as consistent with the Charter of the United Nations. Nor, in my opinion, would such an attack be justified in order to impose a system of international control over the canal – desirable though this is. If, of course, the whole matter were to be taken to the United Nations and if Egypt were to be condemned by them as aggressors, then, of course, the position would be different. And if further action which amounted to obvious aggression by Egypt were taken by Nasser, then again it would be different. So far what Nasser has done amounts to a threat, a grave threat to us and to others, which certainly cannot be ignored; but it is only a threat, not in my opinion justifying retaliation by war."

Gaitskell passionately condemned the eventual Anglo-French military intervention to secure the Suez Canal, supposedly launched to enforce international law and to separate the Egyptian and Israeli combatants; the Israeli attack had in fact been launched in collusion with the British and French to supply a pretext for the invasion. On 31 October he publicly called the invasion "an act of disastrous folly" which threatened the Atlantic Alliance, the United Nations and Commonwealth solidarity. On 4 November 1956 Gaitskell gave a powerful broadcast, attacking the Prime Minister now it was clear Eden had been lying to him in private. Gaitskell was accused by the Conservatives of trying to appeal to the Labour Left, and of betrayal.

Gaitskell's stance on Suez attracted some Liberal support. The pollster Mark Abrams convinced him of the need to broaden Labour's appeal by picking up anti-colonialist votes, but this would be a development of longer-term importance to the Labour Party. At the time Gaitskell was much-criticised in the press, especially for his ill-judged and unsuccessful plea for Tory dissidents to remove Eden from power. The Conservatives not only attacked Gaitskell as unpatriotic for failing to support British troops in action, but also tried to exploit perceived differences between Gaitskell and Bevan, who had rejoined the Shadow Cabinet earlier in the year and who had now been promoted to Shadow Foreign Secretary. Crossman noted that this forced Bevan to be loyal to Gaitskell (15 December 1956), making the two men allies of a kind.

=== Nationalisation and political philosophy ===
Gaitskell was a consensual leader in 1955–59, in contrast to his earlier and later image. Labour was widely expected to win the next general election and in Campbell's view he arguably did not give a clear enough lead or attack the Conservatives aggressively enough.

Gaitskell had initially believed nationalisation to be both morally right and economically efficient, and hoped in vain that manager-worker relations would be transformed. But in 1956 he published a Fabian pamphlet "Socialism and Nationalisation" (actually written three years earlier), arguing that there was no need for greater public ownership, and that his goals were full employment, industrial democracy and a greater spread of economic power. Gaitskell still supported physical controls and his views were a little to the left of those expressed by Anthony Crosland in "The Future of Socialism" (1956).

Gaitskell's political philosophy became known as Gaitskellism, and from the late 1950s brought him into increasing conflict with the trade unions over nationalisation. Besides repudiating the unquestioned commitment to public ownership of the means of production, now seen as merely one of numerous useful devices, he emphasised the goals of personal liberty, social welfare and above all social equality. Gaitskellism tended to downplay loyalty to the Labour movement as a central ethical goal, and argued that the new goals could be achieved if the government used appropriate fiscal and social policy measures within the context of a market-oriented mixed economy. Gaitskell's cadre of supporters included Anthony Crosland, Roy Jenkins, Douglas Jay, Patrick Gordon Walker and James Callaghan.

Frank Cousins became General Secretary of the TGWU in 1956, beginning the process whereby the unions began to shift left. The 1957 Conference endorsed the document "Industry and Society", which called for more flexibility, including state purchase of shares in small private firms. This was loudly condemned by Bevan's wife Jennie Lee and by Michael Foot, editor of Tribune but out of Parliament at the time.

=== 1959 general election ===
In the summer of 1959 Bevan supported Gaitskell on the NEC against Frank Cousins over unilateralism, which Bevan had opposed at the 1957 Conference, and nuclear tests (24 June 1959). Crossman believed Bevan could have overthrown Gaitskell (17 July 1959) and that both Bevan and Gaitskell thought Wilson an unprincipled careerist (13 August 1959). In the summer of 1959 Hugh and Dora Gaitskell, accompanied by Bevan, went to the USSR to copy Macmillan's recent successful trip.

At Newcastle, with a general election clearly imminent, Gaitskell pledged that Labour's spending plans would not require him to raise income tax, for which he was attacked by the Tories for supposed irresponsibility.

During the 1959 election campaign Crossman thought Gaitskell had become "a television star" with Bevan "a rather faded elder statesman behind him" (22 September 1959). The Labour Party had been widely expected to win the 1959 general election, but did not. The Conservatives increased their majority, a fact partly attributable to the post-war prosperity that Britain was now experiencing. Gaitskell was undermined by public doubts about the credibility of proposals to raise pensions and by a highly effective Conservative campaign run by Harold Macmillan under the slogan "Life is better with the Conservatives, don't let Labour ruin it." This election defeat led to questions being asked as to whether Labour could ever win a general election again, but Gaitskell remained as leader.

=== Clause IV ===
Following the election defeat, bitter internecine disputes resumed. Gaitskell blamed the Left for the defeat and attempted unsuccessfully to amend Labour's Clause IV—which its adherents believed committed the party to further nationalisation of industry, while Gaitskell and his followers believed it had become either superfluous or a political liability.

On the Tuesday after the election Gaitskell lunched "bibulously" with Bevan at Asheridge in the Chilterns to discuss his plans for party reform. At this time he had no plans to revise Clause IV. He told Crossman (19 October) that Bevan simply wanted to succeed Jim Griffiths as deputy leader and had shown no inclination to resist moderate policies. After initially expressing surprise, Gaitskell accepted Crossman's advice that Bevan be allowed a veto over any change to nationalisation policy.

The November 1959 Conference, postponed because of the election, was already divided by rumours that Gaitskell was planning action over Clause IV. Ignoring advice from his allies, and partly motivated by detailed polling by Mark Abrams which showed that younger voters regarded Labour as old-fashioned, Gaitskell pushed for reform. Brivati writes that Clause IV was irrelevant in practice but Gaitskell had made "a frontal assault on ... a Labour equivalent of the Thirty-nine Articles of the Church of England".

Bevan saw Gaitskell's speech in advance and made no objection to it at the time. Gaitskell did not rule out further nationalisation, but saw it as a means to an end, pouring scorn on the idea that Labour should be committed to nationalising "the whole of light industry, the whole of agriculture, all the shops, every little pub and garage". Bevan now claimed he had "misunderstood or misheard" what Gaitskell planned and was reported to be "absolutely livid" and "wondering whether to blow the whole thing wide open". In the end he made a conciliatory speech, mentioning that Barbara Castle (who had attacked Gaitskell's proposal) and Gaitskell had both quoted his own dictum that Socialism was about controlling the "commanding heights" of the economy. He argued that according to the principles of Euclid if two things are equal to a third thing they must both be equal to one another, and so there could not be any real difference between Castle and Gaitskell.

Benn wrote (28 November 1959): "Nye's speech this afternoon was witty, scintillating, positive, conciliatory – the model of what a Leader should do. He didn't knock Hugh out but he gently elbowed him aside". The cartoonist "Vicky" showed Gaitskell pedalling to Blackpool on a tandem with Bevan behind him – then pedalling back again but this time with Bevan in the front saddle (30 November 1959).

There was much talk that Bevan might now seize the party leadership, but it seems unlikely that he had the stomach for this anymore, not least as he had never wanted to be leader solely for its own sake. Gaitskell could no longer afford to quarrel with his deputy, and he enjoyed a position of great influence as keeper of the party's conscience, similar to, but much more powerful than, the position of John Prescott relative to Tony Blair forty years later. Moreover, by the end of 1959 Bevan was seriously unwell; he withdrew from the public eye and died in July 1960.

In March 1960 the NEC agreed a new statement of Labour's aims as an addition to Clause IV rather than a replacement. Throughout the summer of 1960 union conferences, many of whose rule books had their own equivalent to Clause IV, were hostile to the new proposal, and in the end four of the six largest unions opposed Gaitskell's plans. The new proposal was demoted to a "valuable expression".

=== Unilateral disarmament ===
Unilateral nuclear disarmament was increasingly popular amongst union activists and was also debated in several union conferences in the spring and summer of 1960. The great majority of the PLP supported NATO and multilateral disarmament.

Gaitskell took on Frank Cousins and wanted to show that Labour were a party of government, not just of opposition. At the October 1960 Scarborough Conference two resolutions in favour of unilateral disarmament – proposed by the TGWU and the Engineers' Union – were carried, whilst the official policy document on defence was rejected. Gaitskell roused his supporters by promising to "Fight and Fight and Fight Again" to reverse the decision. Labour doctrine was that the Parliamentary Party had discretion over the timing of implementation of conference policy. In practice, in the 1940s and 1950s, the unions, whose block votes dominated conference, had been broadly supportive of the PLP, but this was now beginning to change. Gaitskell was challenged unsuccessfully for the leadership by Harold Wilson in November 1960.

The Blackpool Conference of October 1961 saw a narrow conference vote in favour of multilateral disarmament. Winning the unilateralism vote in 1961 restored Gaitskell's authority in the party and his reputation in the country. Unilateral nuclear disarmament remained a divisive issue, and many on the Left continued to call for a change of leadership. Gaitskell was again challenged unsuccessfully for the Labour leadership in November 1961, this time by Anthony Greenwood.

The Campaign for Democratic Socialism was founded to promote the Gaitskellite cause – it never acquired much influence in the ranks of the trades unions, but achieved some success in promoting the selection of friendly Parliamentary candidates. Many of the younger CDS members would later be among the founding members of the breakaway Social Democratic Party (SDP) in 1981.

Richard Hamilton with his wife, Terry Hamilton, both supporters of Campaign for Nuclear Disarmament, collaborated to produce Portrait of Hugh Gaitskell as a Famous Monster of Filmland, 1964, with Richard completing the piece in 1964 after Terry's death in 1962. Arts Council England bought the piece for the national collection, which caused controversy. The painting was considered a tasteless attack. Hamilton stated in his posthumously published autobiography (written in the third person):

When it was completed he was unhappy about the result. The painting did not have the aggression he had intended or the stylistic polarity he had aimed at. It was perhaps too smart-alecky, too clever: sarcasm was not the right tool for a subject that affected all humanity.

=== EEC entry ===
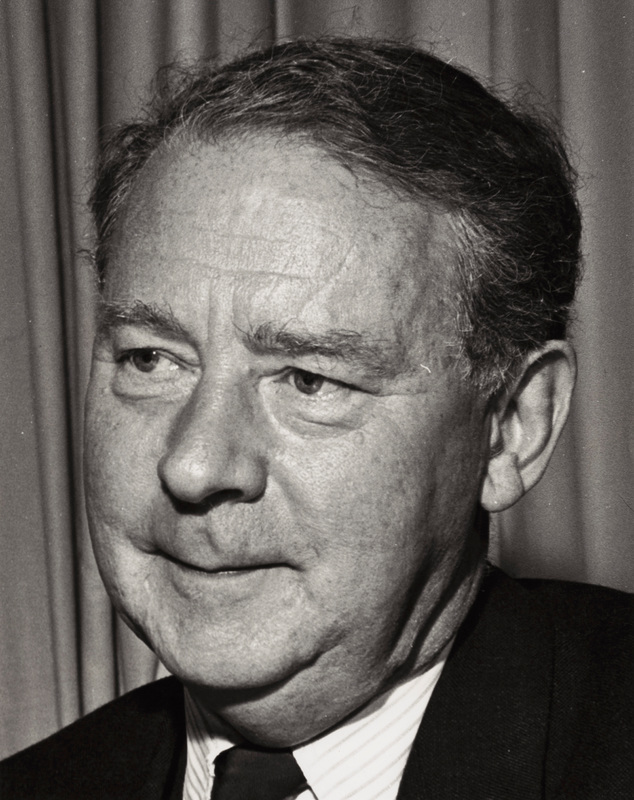
Gaitskell in 1961

Gaitskell alienated some of his supporters by his opposition to British membership of the European Economic Community, which Conservative Prime Minister Macmillan had been seeking since July 1961. Although not entirely opposed in principle to British entry, he believed that the EEC was resistant to reform and that membership would hurt Britain's relations with the Commonwealth.

Gaitskell was particularly fearful that British membership would undermine ties with the Commonwealth. He was worried that the close-knit economic and political ties with Commonwealth nations would have to be dismantled, and replaced by the protectionist Common External Tariff and Common Agricultural Policy in the European Community.

In a speech to the party conference in October 1962, Gaitskell argued that if the aim was for Britain to participate in a Federal Europe, this would mean "the end of Britain as an independent European state, the end of a thousand years of history!" He added: "You may say, all right! Let it end! But, my goodness, it's a decision that needs a little care and thought."

In the speech Gaitskell summoned up the memory of Vimy Ridge and Gallipoli, where Canadian and ANZAC troops had fought alongside British, mixing his defence of national identity with the tradition of the Commonwealth. The speech dismayed many of Gaitskell's natural supporters but was applauded by many on the Left, causing his wife Dora to observe "all the wrong people are cheering".

== Death ==
In mid-December 1962, Gaitskell fell ill with flu, but he was declared well enough by his doctor to travel to the Soviet Union, where he met the Soviet leader Nikita Khrushchev for talks. Upon his return to Britain his condition deteriorated after he contracted another virus. On 4 January 1963 he was admitted to Middlesex Hospital in Marylebone, where, despite efforts by doctors to save his life, he died on 18 January, with his wife at his bedside. He had died from complications following a sudden flare-up of lupus, an autoimmune disease, which had affected his heart and kidneys. He was 56. His body was cremated at Golders Green Crematorium on 23 January 1963. His ashes are buried in the churchyard of St John-at-Hampstead Church, north London. His wife died in 1989 and was buried alongside him.

Gaitskell had inherited £14,000 (around £800,000 at 2015 prices) from an aunt in April 1938, which was invested for him by a friend in the city and multiplied several times (at a time of relatively high inflation). Gaitskell appears to have largely ignored this sum of capital, and his wife had no idea of his wealth. His estate was valued for probate at £80,013-10s-0d on 23 April 1963 (around £1.7m at 2020 prices).

The shock of Gaitskell's death was comparable to that of the sudden death of the later Labour Party leader John Smith in May 1994, when he too seemed to be on the threshold of Number 10.

Beginning with his time as a minister under Attlee, Gaitskell kept a diary until 1956. The diary is an important primary source for the politics of the era.

=== Conspiracy theories ===
Gaitskell's death left an opening for Harold Wilson in the party leadership; Wilson narrowly won the next general election for Labour 21 months later. The abrupt and unexpected nature of Gaitskell's death led to some speculation that foul play might have been involved. The most popular conspiracy theory involved a supposed Soviet KGB plot to ensure that Wilson (alleged by the supporters of these theories to be a KGB agent himself) became prime minister. This claim was given new life by Peter Wright's controversial 1987 book Spycatcher, but the only evidence that ever came to light was the testimony of a Soviet defector, Anatoliy Golitsyn. MI5 repeatedly investigated Wilson over the course of several years before conclusively deciding that he had no relationship with the KGB.

== Legacy ==
=== Gaitskellites and after ===
Gaitskell was adored by followers like Roy Jenkins, who thought him a beacon of hope, decency and integrity, especially as Wilson's government came more and more to seem one of shabby compromises. Left-wingers like Barbara Castle loathed him for his intransigence. Many, including Tony Benn – a Labour centrist at the time – simply thought him a divisive figure and initially welcomed Wilson as a fresh start who could unite the party. In the event Wilson's closest allies as Prime Minister – Crossman and Castle – were former Bevanites.

However, many of the Gaitskellites held leading positions in Harold Wilson's Cabinet of 1964–70. Many of them – e.g. Roy Jenkins and Bill Rodgers but not Anthony Crosland or Douglas Jay – became supporters of British membership of the EEC, an issue on which Labour was split in the 1970s and which helped to precipitate the SDP split of 1981.

John Campbell writes that "the echoes of the Gaitskell–Bevan rivalry continued to divide the party right up to the 1980s". Neil Kinnock (Labour Leader 1983–92) grew up in South Wales and was brought up as an admirer of Bevan, but although he disliked the comparison his battle with the hard-left Militant tendency in the mid-1980s had echoes of Gaitskellism; John Smith (Labour Leader 1992–4) had been a Gaitskellite as a young man in the early 1960s; Tony Blair's first act as leader in 1994 was finally to abolish Clause IV – for this and other acts he was supported by the elderly Roy Jenkins, who had become a Liberal Democrat by then. Like Gaitskell before him, Blair was often seen by many of his enemies in the Labour Party as a public-school educated, middle-class interloper.

Tony Benn contrasted Gaitskell's stand on the Suez Crisis to that of the former British Prime Minister Tony Blair on the war in Iraq. Margaret Thatcher compared Blair with Gaitskell in a different manner, warning her party when Blair came to power that he was the most formidable Labour leader since Hugh Gaitskell.

=== Assessments ===
Gaitskell's socialism was, in Campbell's view, that of a public servant wanting to see the world more rationally governed. Gaitskell very likely might have become Prime Minister had he lived; however, he left no lasting monument other than "the fading memory of promise unfulfilled". Gaitskell, although no Marxist, was a sincere socialist but nonetheless was in some respects the first "moderniser" who saw how Labour would have to adapt to survive.

His longtime close friend Roy Jenkins concluded a decade afterwards, in an article which he later quoted in his memoirs:

All his struggles illustrated some blemishes as well as exceptional strength. He would not have been a perfect prime minister. He was stubborn, rash, and could in a paradoxical way become too emotionally committed to an over-rational position which, once he had thought it rigorously through, he believed must be the final answer. He was only a moderately good judge of people. But when these faults are put in the scales and weighed against his qualities they shrivel away. He had purpose and direction, courage and humanity. He was a man for raising the sights of politics. He clashed on great issues. He avoided the petty bitterness of personal jealousy. You could raise a banner which men were proud to follow, but he never perverted his leadership ability; it was infused by sense and humour, and by a desire to change the world, not for his own satisfaction, but so that people might more enjoy living in it.... He was that very rare phenomenon, a great politician who was also an unusually agreeable man.

Because he never became prime minister, and because of the great capacity many considered that he had for the post, Hugh Gaitskell is remembered largely with respect from people both within and outside of the Labour Party. Gaitskell is regarded by some as "the best Prime Minister we never had".

Brivati acknowledged that he had "an almost reckless honesty and courage" which could turn into stubbornness. "His leadership was a heroic failure" and "The defining moment of the post-war history of the Labour Party". Although by 1963 Gaitskell appeared to be on the verge of leading Labour back into power, it still took what Brivati describes as "the greatest performance by a leader of the opposition [last] century" for Harold Wilson to lead Labour back by a narrow majority.

Brivati writes that for Gaitskell "socialism was not an end state ... but the reform of institutions and practices for the more effective realisation of preferred values". Evan Durbin's Politics of Democratic Socialism (1940) was a seminal text. Gaitskell was not, in Brivati's view, a "progressive" in any modern sense. He favoured equality and thought the free market wasteful. He wanted to incorporate Liberal opinion within the Labour vote. However, the modernising leaders of subsequent generations, Neil Kinnock and Tony Blair, were to a certain extent continuing Gaitskell's tradition.

=== Memorials ===
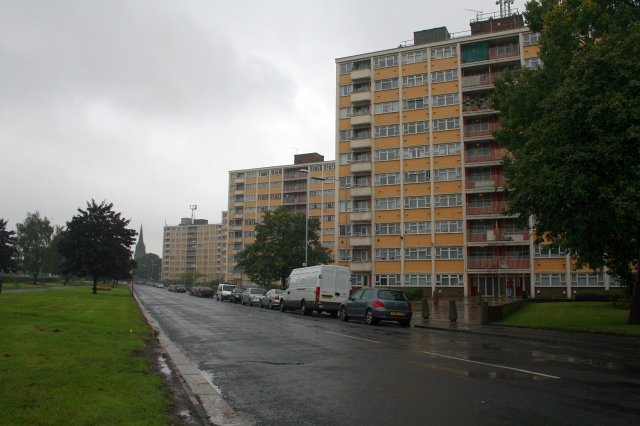
The Gaitskell flats in Holbeck, Leeds were named after Gaitskell. They were demolished in 2010.

His name appears in popular culture from time to time. For example, Hugh Gaitskell House is the building Nicholas Lyndhurst's character, Garry Sparrow, is looking for in Goodnight Sweetheart when he first stumbles into Second World War London. A tower block of that name can be found opposite Stoke Newington railway station in North London.

Hugh Gaitskell Primary School is situated in Beeston, part of his former Leeds South constituency, the area is now represented by Hilary Benn.

In 1978, some 15 years after his death, a new housing development by Sandwell council in the Tividale area of the West Midlands was named Gaitskell Terrace.

A portrait bust of Hugh Gaitskell was made by British sculptor Leslie Cubitt Bevis in 1964 and purchased by the National Portrait Gallery in 1967.

Gaitskell was buried in Hampstead, and a memorial plaque to his name is prominently placed in the cloisters of New College, Oxford.

== Bibliography ==
- Brivati, Brian. "Gaitskell, Hugh Todd Naylor (1906–1963)", Oxford Dictionary of National Biography (Oxford University Press, 2004; online edn, Jan 2011) accessed 26 June 2016 doi:10.1093/ref:odnb/33309 (print edition listed under "Matthew" below)
- Brivati, Brian. Hugh Gaitskell (2006) London: Politico's Publishing/Methuen. ISBN 978-1842751862
- Davies, A.J. To Build a New Jerusalem: The Labour Movement from the 1880s to the 1990 (1992) Abacus ISBN 0-349-10809-9
- Campbell, John (2010). Pistols at Dawn: Two Hundred Years of Political Rivalry from Pitt and Fox to Blair and Brown. London: Vintage. ISBN 978-1-84595-091-0. (contains an essay on Gaitskell and Bevan)
- Dell, Edmund (1997). The Chancellors: A History of the Chancellors of the Exchequer, 1945–90. London: HarperCollins. ISBN 978-0-00-638418-2. (pp. 135–58 covers his term as Chancellor)
- Dutton, David. British Politics Since 1945: The Rise, Fall and Rebirth of Consensus (2nd ed. Blackwell, 1997). excerpt for political history seen from the Post-War Consensus viewpoint.
- Jones, Tudor. Remaking the Labour Party: From Gaitskell to Blair (1996) excerpt and text search
- Matthew, Colin, ed. (2004). Dictionary of National Biography. Vol. 21. Oxford: Oxford University Press. ISBN 978-0-19-861411-1., essay on Gaitskell written by Brian Brivati
- Pelling, Henry (1992) [1963]. A History of British Trade Unionism. London: Penguin. ISBN 978-0-14-013640-1.
- Thorpe, D. R. (1989). Selwyn Lloyd. London: Jonathan Cape Ltd. ISBN 978-0-224-02828-8.
- Williams, Philip (1985) [1979]. Hugh Gaitskell. London: Jonathan Cape Ltd. ISBN 978-0-224-01451-9.
- Williams, Philip, ed. (1983) [1979]. The Diary of Hugh Gaitskell 1945-1956. London: Jonathan Cape Ltd. ISBN 978-0-224-01911-8.

Parliament of the United Kingdom
| Preceded by Henry Charleton | Member of Parliament for Leeds South; 1945–1963 | Succeeded by Merlyn Rees |
Political offices
| Preceded by William Foster | Parliamentary Secretary to the Ministry of Fuel and Power; 1946–1947 | Succeeded by Alfred Robens |
| Preceded by Manny Shinwell | Minister of Fuel and Power; 1947–1950 | Succeeded by Philip Noel-Baker |
| Preceded by Sir Stafford Cripps | Minister for Economic Affairs; 1950^{1} | Vacant Office abolished Title next held by Sir Arthur Salter |
| Preceded by Sir Stafford Cripps | Chancellor of the Exchequer; 1950–1951 | Succeeded by Rab Butler |
| Preceded by Arthur Greenwood | Treasurer of the Labour Party; 1954–1956 | Succeeded by Aneurin Bevan |
| Preceded by Clement Attlee | Leader of the Labour Party; 1955–1963 | Succeeded by Harold Wilson |
| Preceded by Clement Attlee | Leader of the Opposition; 1955–1963 | Succeeded by Harold Wilson |
Notes and references
1. "List of Ministers". The National Archives. Archived from the original on 20 November 2007.
