= Bevanism =

Political ideology of Aneurin Bevan

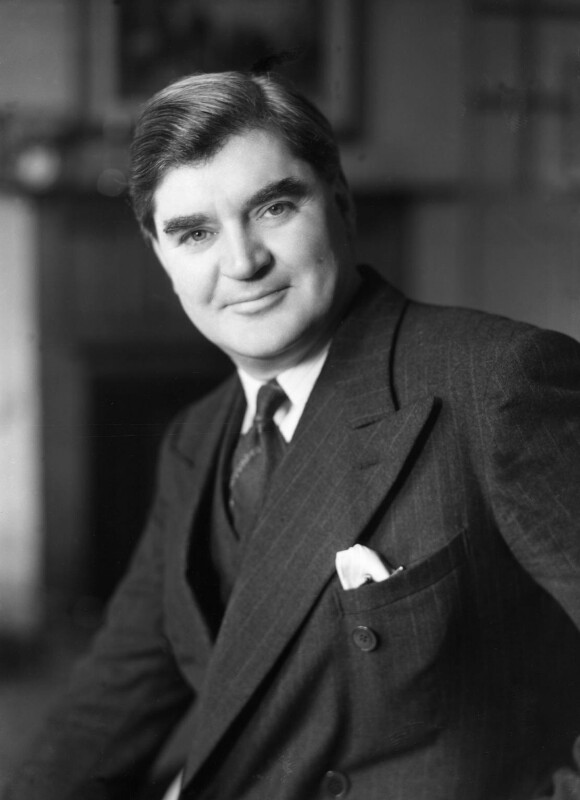
Aneurin Bevan

Bevanism was a movement on the left wing of the Labour Party in the late 1950s led by Aneurin Bevan which also included Richard Crossman, Michael Foot and Barbara Castle. Bevanism was opposed by the Gaitskellites, moderate social democrats within the party. The Gaitskellites typically won most of the battles inside Parliament, but Bevanism was stronger among local Labour activists. The Bevanites split over the issue of nuclear weapons, and the movement faded away after Bevan died in 1960.

== History ==
Bevanism was influenced by Marxism; Bevan's biographer and later Leader of the Labour Party Michael Foot said that Bevan's "belief in the class conflict stayed unshaken", while acknowledging that Bevan was not a traditional Marxist. Despite declaring inspiration from Karl Marx, Bevan did not visibly support insurrectionist concepts of proletarian revolution, arguing that revolution depended on the circumstances, or the typical organisational model of many Communist parties. According to Ed Balls, Bevan and his supporters instead preferred a strident but pluralist conception of democratic socialism, tempered by pragmatic sensibilities and practical application.

The Bevanite Group of MPs, of which there were about three dozen, coalesced following Bevan's resignation from the Cabinet in 1951 when the health service started charging for previously free services such as spectacles in order to help pay for Britain's involvement in the Korean War. Bevanites Harold Wilson and John Freeman resigned with Bevan himself. The group in Parliament drew heavily from the previous "Keep Left" group, which had previously dissented from the pro-American foreign policy of the 1945–1951 Labour government favoured by Clement Attlee, his Foreign Secretary Ernest Bevin and Hugh Gaitskell. According to Crossman in December 1951 the group was not organised, and Bevan could not be persuaded to have any consistent or coherent strategy, but they did have a group who met regularly and liked each other and came to represent "real Socialism" to a large number of Party members. Picture Post called them the "Bevanly Host" in April 1952.

== Local organisations ==
Bevanites organised in Constituency Labour Parties across Britain, and set up local discussion groups known as "Brains Trusts", also a legacy of the "Keep Left" group.

Brains Trusts organised in support of the newspaper favoured by Bevanites, Tribune magazine, allocating left-wing MPs and campaigners to form speaking panels around the country. Tribune itself provided an important print voice for Bevanite politicians and was in wide circulation.

== Objectives ==
The Bevanite movement emerged from the earlier "Keep Left" group, which had formed in 1947 around the New Statesman journal and published pamphlets critiquing the Labour government's policies. The Keep Left group had attempted through discussion and pamphlets to produce practical proposals informed by socialist values, and their concerns about government economic and international policies showed affinities with later Bevanite positions.

The main Bevanite objectives were:

=== Economic and Social Policy ===
- State ownership of the "commanding heights of the economy". Many nationalisations had made up the bedrock of Labour's previous manifestos, such as "Let us face the future". Bevanites' views towards nationalisation mirrored those of Vladimir Lenin, in that state control was only seen as necessary in the context of exchange or distribution, as opposed to the total and immediate appropriation of as much private property as possible.
- A comprehensive and completely free 'cradle to grave' system of welfare, health provision and education. This reflected their commitment to preserving and extending the welfare state established by the 1945 Labour government.
- Housing for all. Bevan, as Minister of Housing, had taken steps to repair war damage to housing, provide prefabricated housing and grant subsidies to local authorities to enable them to offer homes available for rent.
- Full employment. The Keep Left pamphlets had emphasised the importance of manpower management and maintaining the gains made since 1945.
- The nationalisation of the steel industry, contrary to the views of many colleagues.
- Greater industrial democracy and workers' control of nationalized industries, which Bevan believed were governed unconstitutionally due to their lack of public accountability.

=== Political Philosophy and Approach ===
- Contempt for dogma as a modus operandi; an open-minded approach to democratic socialism. The Keep Left pamphlets advocated for a form of socialism that "does not, like communism, mean transferring the economic power of the all-powerful capitalist to an all-powerful Party" but rather "distributing economic power between three groups: the democratic representatives in Parliament and on the local authorities; enlightened management; and the workers themselves."
- Respect for the arts and cultural policy. This reflected a broader vision of socialism that encompassed cultural as well as economic transformation.
- A complementary ability to drop unpopular policies when necessary, demonstrating pragmatic flexibility.
- Freedom of debate, opinion and criticism within the Labour Party. The group valued discussion and debate as essential to developing alternative policy proposals.

=== Defence and International Relations ===
- General unwillingness to yield upon the perceived gains made since 1945, for example, opposition to means testing for social security benefits, and opposition to prescription charges as military spending increased. The Bevanite Group coalesced following Bevan's resignation from the Cabinet in 1951 when the health service started charging for previously free services such as spectacles in order to help pay for Britain's involvement in the Korean War.
- Scepticism towards most American foreign policy, especially the Southeast Asia Treaty Organization and West German rearmament. The Keep Left pamphlet had advocated a democratic socialist "third force" foreign policy, with a socialist Europe acting independently from either the United States or the Soviet Union, against the pro-American foreign policy of Labour foreign secretary Ernest Bevin.
- Opposition to high defence expenditure, especially for nuclear weapons, and calls for better relations with the Soviet Union. However, the movement later split over nuclear weapons when Bevan began advocating the maintenance of Britain's nuclear deterrent, saying that without them a future British foreign secretary would be going "naked into the conference chamber."

=== Organisational Method ===
- Bevanites organised in Constituency Labour Parties across Britain, and set up local discussion groups known as "Brains Trusts", a legacy of the "Keep Left" group. These organised in support of Tribune magazine, allocating left-wing MPs and campaigners to form speaking panels around the country.
- Tribune magazine provided an important print voice for Bevanite politicians and was in wide circulation among party activists.

The Bevanites represented what they considered to be "real Socialism" and maintained strong support among constituency Labour parties, though the Gaitskellites typically won most of the battles inside Parliament, while Bevanism was stronger among local Labour activists.

== Party role ==
Historian Kenneth O. Morgan says. "Bevan alone kept the flag of left-wing socialism aloft throughout – which gave him a matchless authority amongst the constituency parties and in party conference." At the 1952 Labour Party Conference, Bevanites were elected to six of the seven places on the National Executive Committee by constituency representatives.

== Bevanites ==
Other than Bevan himself, the following prominent Labour politicians are often considered Bevanites, but may not identify themselves as such:

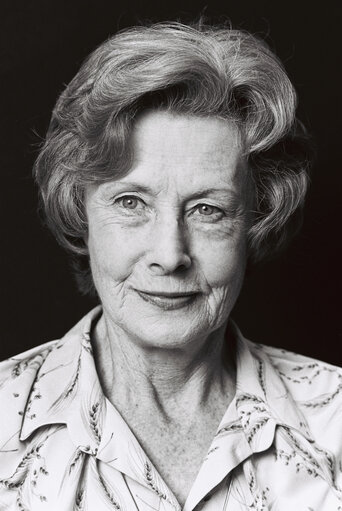
Barbara Castle

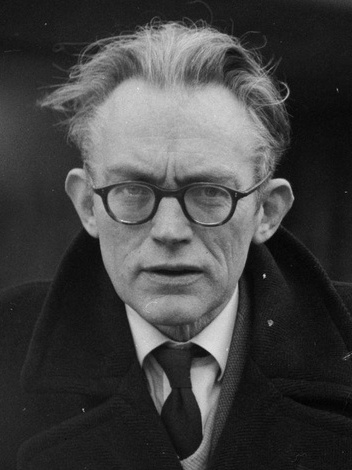
Michael Foot

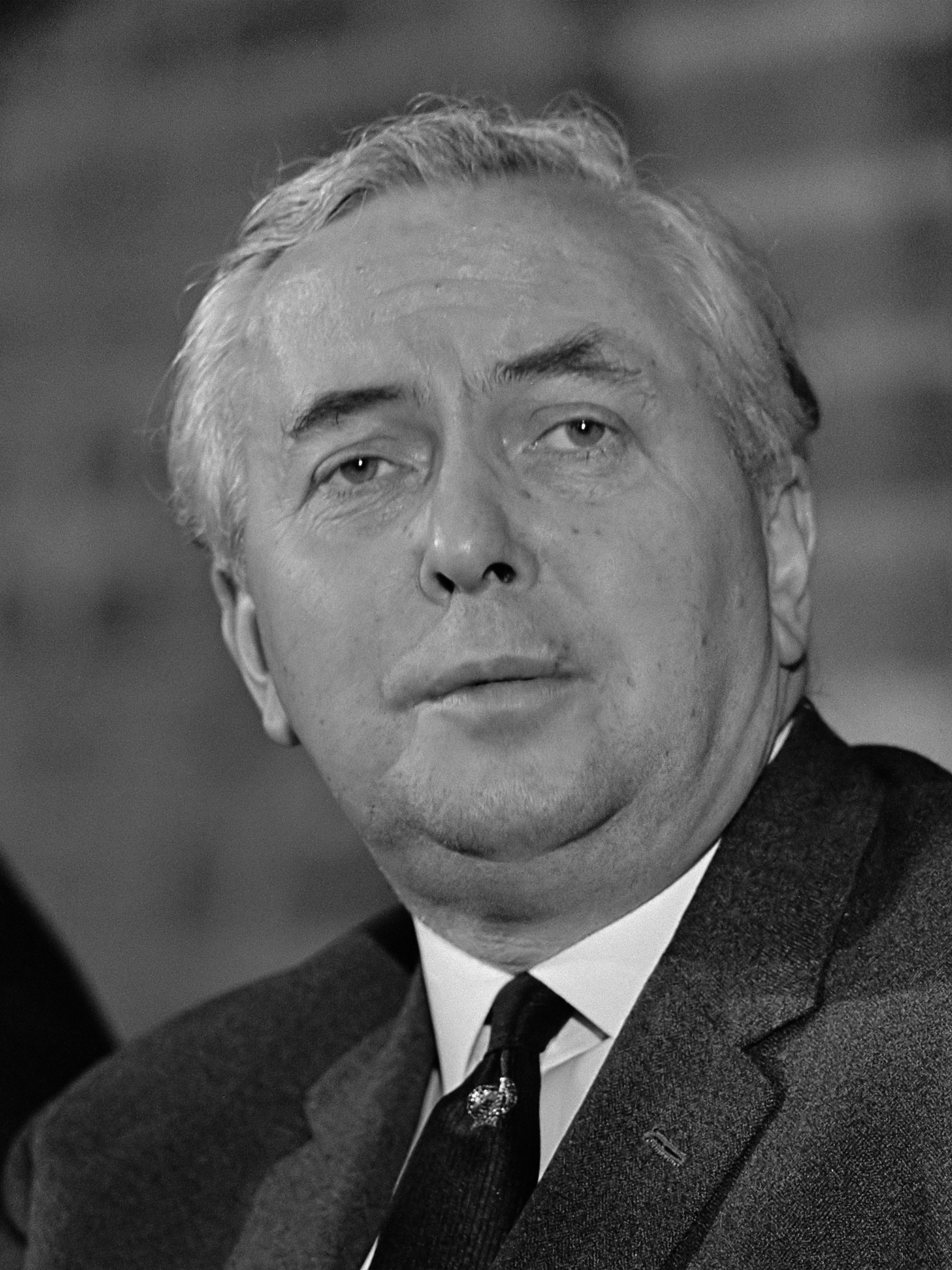
Harold Wilson

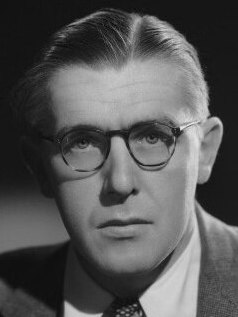
Richard Crossman

- Barbara Castle – former Secretary of State for Employment and Secretary of State for Health and Social Security – Leading Bevanite who was elected to the National Executive Committee in 1952 alongside other Bevanites. Known for her socialist principles and role in advancing women's rights through legislation such as the Equal Pay Act.
- Richard Crossman – former Leader of the House of Commons and Secretary of State for Health and Social Services – University classics lecturer who became one of the intellectual leaders of the Bevanite movement. Co-authored the "Keep Left" pamphlet and served on Labour's National Executive Committee from 1952.
- Tom Driberg – former MP for Maldon and Barking – Journalist and politician who was prominent in the "Keep Left" group that became the Bevanites. Never held ministerial office but was influential in left-wing politics and served as Labour Party Chairman.
- Michael Foot – former Leader of the Labour Party and Secretary of State for Employment – Joined with Richard Crossman and Ian Mikardo as one of the "ringleaders" of the group that became disgruntled with the Attlee government's diminishing socialist impetus after 1947. Later became Labour Party leader and authored Bevan's biography.
- John Freeman – former Parliamentary Secretary to the Ministry of Supply – Resigned alongside Bevan and Wilson in April 1951 over NHS prescription charges. Later became editor of the New Statesman and pioneered the television interview programme Face to Face.
- Anthony Greenwood - left-wing challenger to Hugh Gaitskell in 1961, later serving in Harold Wilson's governments.
- Neil Kinnock – former Leader of the Labour Party – Admirer of Nye Bevan who contributed a foreword to a reprint of Bevan's "In Place of Fear" in 1978. Received support from surviving Bevanites including Ian Mikardo, Barbara Castle, and Michael Foot during his leadership.
- Ian Mikardo – former MP and Chairman of the Labour Party – Ardent socialist and Zionist who remained a backbencher but was a member of the National Executive Committee for most years between 1950 and 1978. Co-authored the "Keep Left" pamphlet and was a founding member of the Tribune Group.
- Harold Wilson – former Prime Minister of the United Kingdom and Leader of the Labour Party – Resigned alongside Bevan and Freeman in April 1951 over NHS prescription charges. Later became Labour leader and Prime Minister, though he largely followed more moderate economic policies while in government despite his Bevanite background.

== Split over nuclear disarmament ==
Later in his political career, Bevan began advocating the maintenance of Britain's nuclear deterrent, against those who became associated with the Campaign for Nuclear Disarmament (CND), saying that without them a future British foreign secretary would be going "naked into the conference chamber." This split the Bevanites; many, such as leading Bevanite Michael Foot, continued to oppose Britain's nuclear weapons, with Labour's 1983 manifesto under Foot's leadership of the party calling for unilateral nuclear disarmament.

== See also ==
- History of the British Labour Party
- Political history of the United Kingdom (1945–present)
- Tony Benn
- Barbara Castle
- Richard Crossman
- Tom Driberg
- Jennie Lee, Baroness Lee of Asheridge
- Ian Mikardo
- George Thomas, 1st Viscount Tonypandy
