= Clause IV =

Section of the British Labour Party's constitution concerning economic views

Clause IV is part of the Labour Party Rule Book which sets out the aims and values of the British Labour Party. The original clause, adopted in 1918, called for common ownership of industry, and proved controversial in later years; Hugh Gaitskell attempted to remove the clause following Labour's loss in the 1959 general election.

In 1995, under the leadership of Tony Blair, a new Clause IV was adopted. This was seen as a significant moment in Blair's redefinition of the party as New Labour, but has in the years since survived beyond the New Labour branding.

== Text ==
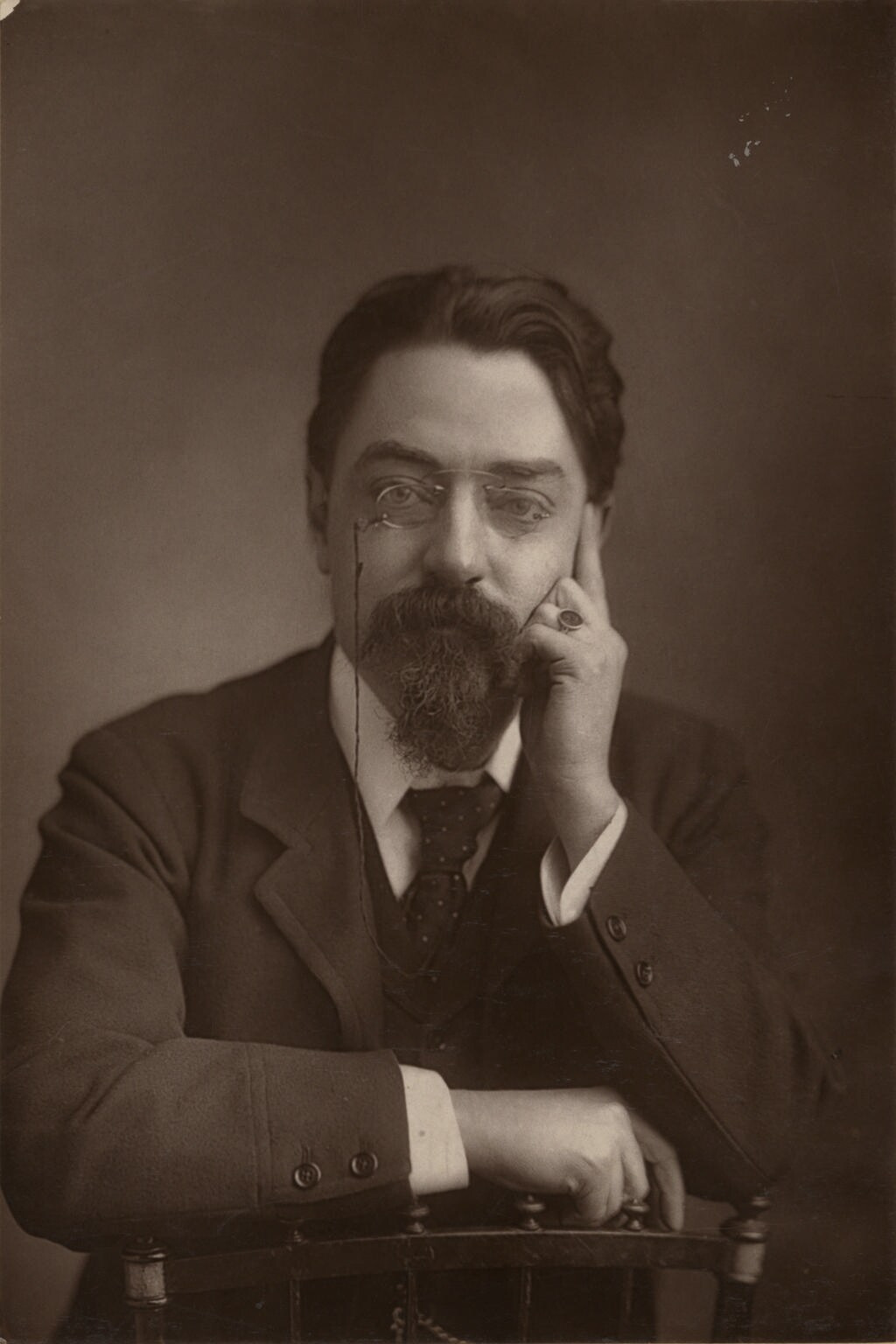
Sidney Webb, a socialist economist and early member of the Fabian Society who drafted the original Clause IV in 1917.

The original version of Clause IV was drafted by Sidney and Beatrice Webb in November 1917, and adopted by the party in 1918. It read, in part 4:

To secure for the workers by hand or by brain the full fruits of their industry and the most equitable distribution thereof that may be possible upon the basis of the common ownership of the means of production, distribution and exchange, and the best obtainable system of popular administration and control of each industry or service.

This section was widely seen as the Labour Party's commitment to socialism, even though the word "socialism" is not explicitly mentioned. The Manchester Guardian heralded it as showing "the Birth of a Socialist Party", stating that:

The changes of machinery are not revolutionary, but they are significant. There is now for the first time embodied in the constitution of the party a declaration of political principles, and these principles are definitely Socialistic. ... In other words, the Labour party becomes a Socialist party (the decisive phrase is "the common ownership of the means of production") ... Platonic resolutions have been passed before now, both by the Labour party and by the Trade Unions Congress in favour of the Socialistic organisation of society, but they are now for the first time made an integral part of the party constitution.

In 1918, nationalisation was seen by many voters as akin to modernisation – the nationalisation of the railways was a widely supported policy, for instance, as it would reduce the plethora of uncoordinated and competing companies. This text is usually assumed to involve nationalisation of the whole economy, but close reading of the text shows that there are many other possible interpretations. Common ownership, though later given a technical definition in the Industrial Common Ownership Act 1976, could mean municipal ownership, worker cooperatives or consumer cooperatives.

In December 1944, the Labour Party adopted a policy of "public ownership" and won a clear endorsement for its policies – the destruction of the "evil giants" of want, ignorance, squalour, disease and idleness (identified by William Beveridge in the Beveridge Report)– in the post-war election victory of 1945 which brought Clement Attlee to power. However, the party had no clear plan as to how public ownership would shape their reforms, and much debate ensued.

The nationalization was led by Herbert Morrison, who had had the experience of uniting London's buses and underground train system into a centralized system in the 1930s. He started with the Bank of England in April 1946, whereby stockholders received compensation and the governor and deputy governor were both re-appointed. Further industries swiftly followed: civil aviation in 1946, and railways and telecommunications in 1947, along with the creation of the National Coal Board, which was responsible for supplying 90% of the UK's energy needs. 1946 also saw the establishment of the National Health Service, which came into force in July 1948; railways, canals, road haulage and electricity were all also nationalised in 1948. By 1951, the iron, steel and gas industries had also been brought into public ownership.

== Hugh Gaitskell's fight ==
After losing the 1959 general election, Labour Party leader Hugh Gaitskell came to believe that public opposition to nationalisation had led to the party's poor performance and proposed to amend Clause IV. The left wing of the party fought back and managed to defeat any change: symbolically, it was then agreed to include Clause IV, part 4, on Labour Party membership cards.

The economic crisis of the 1970s, and the defeats suffered by the trade union movement, as well as the decline in influence of the Communist Party of Great Britain, led to a strengthening of the position of Labour Party members who were opposed to Marxism.

== Tony Blair's alteration ==
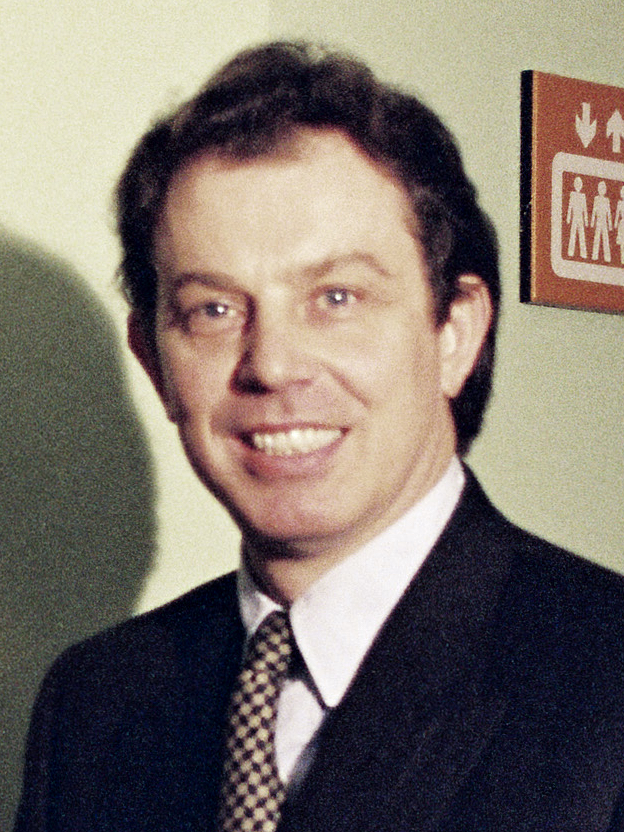
Tony Blair, Labour leader 1994–2007 and Prime Minister 1997–2007

Tony Blair had in 1993, before becoming Leader of the Labour Party, written a pamphlet for the Fabian Society which criticised the wording of Clause IV for not clearly stating the means and ends of the party. Blair put forward a case for re-defining socialism in terms of a set of values which were constant, while the policies needed to achieve them would have to account for a changing society. At the conclusion of the 1994 conference, after becoming Leader, Blair proposed that the Labour Party needed a new statement of aims and values and stated that he would draw one up and present it to the party. This astonished many people, as the last time such a move had been taken in the late 1950s, it had been a failure. The new version was adopted at a Special Conference at Easter 1995 following a debate, and reads, in part:

The Labour Party is a democratic socialist party. It believes that by the strength of our common endeavour we achieve more than we achieve alone, so as to create for each of us the means to realise our true potential and for all of us a community in which power, wealth and opportunity are in the hands of the many, not the few, where the rights we enjoy reflect the duties we owe, and where we live together, freely, in a spirit of solidarity, tolerance and respect.

This version of Clause IV currently appears on the back of individual Labour Party membership cards today.

Presentationally, the abandonment of the socialist principles of the original Clause IV represented a break with Labour's past and, specifically, a break with its 1983 Manifesto (dubbed "the longest suicide note in history", by Gerald Kaufman, one of the party's MPs), in which greater state ownership was proposed.

== Jeremy Corbyn's leadership ==
The leader of the Labour Party from 2015 to 2020, Jeremy Corbyn, was a consistent supporter of renationalising public utilities, such as British Rail and energy companies, to bring them back into public ownership.

Corbyn ignited controversy within his party in an interview with The Independent on Sunday:

"I think we should talk about what the objectives of the party are, whether that's restoring the Clause Four as it was originally written or it's a different one, but I think we shouldn't shy away from public participation, public investment in industry and public control of the railways. I'm interested in the idea that we have a more inclusive, clearer set of objectives. I would want us to have a set of objectives which does include public ownership of some necessary things such as rail."

Although this has been seen by some as an endorsement for the reinstatement of the original Clause IV, Corbyn denied this and said that more discussion within the party was needed.

During the 2016 leadership election Owen Smith called for a rewriting of Clause IV to make a specific reference to tackling inequality, which he said should be "right at the heart of everything that we do".

== Other uses ==
Clause Four was also the name of a campaigning group within the Labour Party's student wing (now Labour Students), which succeeded in ending its control by the Militant group in 1975. However, the attempt of the Clause Four group to oppose Militant in the Labour Party Young Socialists (LPYS) was a failure, and LPYS was eventually dissolved.

=== Clause Four moment ===
The changing of Clause IV was seen by political commentators as the defining moment at which Old Labour became New Labour. The phrase "Clause Four moment" has subsequently become a metaphor for any need or perceived need for a fundamental recasting of a political party's principles or attitudes.

== See also ==
- Labour Party Constitution
