= 1894 Hackney South by-election =

UK Parliamentary by-election

The 1894 Hackney South by-election was held on 7 May 1894 following the resignation of the incumbent Liberal MP, Sir Charles Russell, prior to being made a Lord of Appeal in Ordinary. Russell vacated his Parliamentary seat by being appointed Steward of the Manor of Northstead on 26 April 1894.

== Candidates ==
The Conservative Party candidate was Thomas Herbert Robertson, a barrister. He had contested the constituency at the previous general election.

The Liberal Party candidate was John Fletcher Moulton. Moulton had been the Member of Parliament for Clapham from 1885 to 1886 and had contested Nottingham South in 1892.

== Result ==
1894 Hackney South by-election
Party	Candidate	Votes	%	±%
Liberal	John Fletcher Moulton	4,530	51.1	−6.3
Conservative	Thomas Robertson	4,338	48.9	+6.3
Majority		192	2.2	−12.6
Turnout		8,868	75.9	+5.9
Registered electors		11,688		
Liberal hold		Swing	−6.3	
