= Herbert Morrison =

British politician (1888–1965)

The Right Honourable The Lord Morrison of Lambeth CH PC
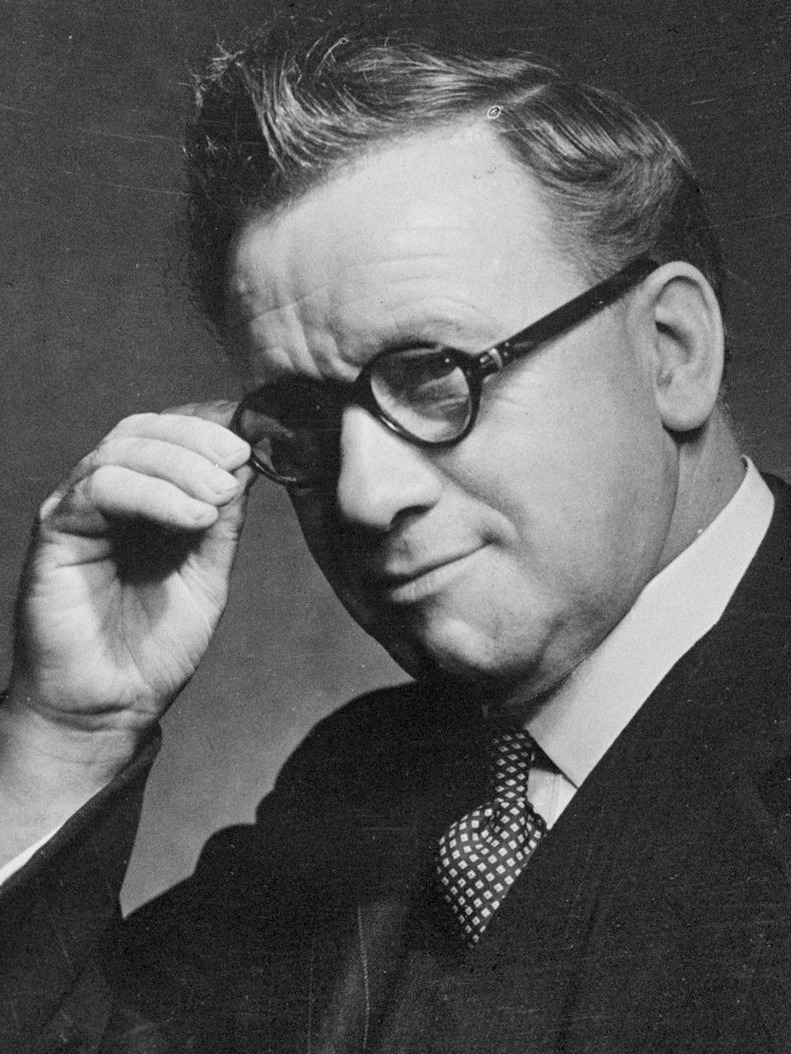
- Morrison in 1947

Leader of the Opposition
- In office 25 November 1955 – 14 December 1955
- Monarch: Elizabeth II
- Prime Minister: Anthony Eden
- Preceded by: Clement Attlee
- Succeeded by: Hugh Gaitskell

Deputy Leader of the Opposition
- In office 26 October 1951 – 25 November 1955
- Leader: Clement Attlee
- Preceded by: Anthony Eden
- Succeeded by: Jim Griffiths

Deputy Leader of the Labour Party
- In office 26 July 1945 – 14 December 1955
- Leader: Clement Attlee
- Preceded by: Arthur Greenwood
- Succeeded by: Jim Griffiths
Ministerial positions
Foreign Secretary
In office 9 March 1951 – 26 October 1951
Prime Minister	Clement Attlee
Preceded by	Ernest Bevin
Succeeded by	Anthony Eden
Lord President of the Council
In office 26 July 1945 – 9 March 1951
Prime Minister	Clement Attlee
Preceded by	The Lord Woolton
Succeeded by	The Viscount Addison
Leader of the House of Commons
In office 26 July 1945 – 16 March 1951
Prime Minister	Clement Attlee
Preceded by	Anthony Eden
Succeeded by	James Chuter Ede
Home Secretary Minister of Home Security
In office 4 October 1940 – 23 May 1945
Prime Minister	Winston Churchill
Preceded by	John Anderson
Succeeded by	Donald Somervell
Minister of Supply
In office 12 May 1940 – 4 October 1940
Prime Minister	Winston Churchill
Preceded by	Leslie Burgin
Succeeded by	Andrew Rae Duncan
Minister of Transport
In office 7 June 1929 – 24 August 1931
Prime Minister	Ramsay MacDonald
Preceded by	Wilfrid Ashley
Succeeded by	John Pybus
Local Government positions
Leader of the London County Council
In office 9 March 1934 – 27 May 1940
Preceded by	William Ray
Succeeded by	Charles Latham

Member of the House of Lords Lord Temporal
- Life peerage 2 November 1959 – 6 March 1965

Member of Parliament
- In office 14 November 1935 – 18 September 1959
- Preceded by: Marjorie Graves
- Succeeded by: Carol Johnson
- Constituency: Hackney South (1935–1945); Lewisham East (1945–1950); Lewisham South (1950–1959)
- In office 30 May 1929 – 7 October 1931
- Preceded by: George Garro-Jones
- Succeeded by: Marjorie Graves
- Constituency: Hackney South
- In office 6 December 1923 – 9 October 1924
- Preceded by: Clifford Erskine-Bolst
- Succeeded by: George Garro-Jones
- Constituency: Hackney South

Personal details
- Born: Herbert Stanley Morrison; 3 January 1888 London, England
- Died: 6 March 1965 (aged 77) Sidcup, Kent, England
- Party: Labour
- Spouses: Margaret Kent (m. 1919; died 1953) Edith Meadowcroft (m. 1955)
- Children: 1
- Relatives: Peter Mandelson (grandson)

Herbert Stanley Morrison, Baron Morrison of Lambeth (3 January 1888 – 6 March 1965) was a British politician who held a variety of senior positions in the Cabinet as a member of the Labour Party. During the inter-war period he was Minister of Transport during the second MacDonald ministry, then after losing his parliamentary seat at the 1931 general election he became Leader of the London County Council in the 1930s. After returning to the Commons, he was defeated by Clement Attlee in the 1935 Labour Party leadership election but later served as Home Secretary in the wartime coalition.

Morrison organised Labour's victorious 1945 election campaign, and was appointed Leader of the House of Commons and acted as Attlee's deputy prime minister in the Attlee ministry of 1945–51. Attlee, Morrison, Ernest Bevin, Stafford Cripps, and initially Hugh Dalton formed the "Big Five" who dominated those governments. Morrison oversaw Labour's nationalisation programme, although he opposed Aneurin Bevan's proposals for a national body to run the National Health Service. Morrison developed his social views from his work in local politics and always emphasised the importance of public works to deal with unemployment. In the final year of Attlee's premiership, Morrison had an unhappy term as Foreign Secretary. He was hailed as "Lord Festival" for his successful leadership of the Festival of Britain, a critical and popular success in 1951 that attracted millions of visitors to fun-filled educational exhibits and events in London and across the country.

Morrison was widely expected to succeed Attlee as Labour leader but Attlee, who disliked him, postponed stepping down until 1955. Morrison, who by then was nearing 70 and considered too old, came a poor third in the 1955 Labour leadership election.

== Early life ==
Morrison was born in Brixton, Lambeth, London, youngest child (there being two boys and four girls) of police constable Henry Morrison (c. 1849−1917) and Priscilla Caroline, née Lyon (c. 1848−1907), daughter of an East End carpet fitter. Henry Morrison had a "weakness for the bottle", and held strong Conservative political opinions with which his son would later come to disagree strongly.

As a baby, he permanently lost the sight in his right eye due to infection. He attended Stockwell Road Primary School and, from the age of 11, St Andrew's Church of England School. He left school at 14 to become an errand boy and then a shop assistant. He recalled in 1949 in a foreword to P C Hoffman's history of shop worker trades unionism, how hard his life had been: "I started at eight in the morning. I finished at half past nine in the evening, ten on Fridays and midnight on Saturdays. It was years before we got an early closing day, and then it was five o'clock. I enjoyed the work...but it was a dog's life, especially as I was trying to read and study in my spare time".

He developed strong socialist beliefs as a teenager, firstly through listening to street orators, and then through extensive reading. He developed an interest in improving social conditions, after deciding that poor living conditions were the cause of many social ills. His early politics were radical, and in 1907 he joined the Social Democratic Federation; however, he soon rejected the revolutionary politics of that organisation, and joined the more moderate Independent Labour Party (ILP) in 1910, becoming a dedicated activist. During the First World War, although he could have escaped military service due to his blind eye, he chose to make a stand and become a conscientious objector, and he was sent to work in a market garden in Letchworth.

== Political career ==
=== Local politics in London, 1919–1929 ===
Morrison became a pioneer leader in the London Labour Party (LLP) and one of its leading organisers. He was elected to the Metropolitan Borough of Hackney in 1919 when the Labour Party won control of the Borough, and he served as Mayor during 1920–21. In 1921 he came into conflict with many in the LLP in opposing the Poplar Rates Rebellion in the neighbouring borough of Poplar, led by the future party leader George Lansbury. Morrison believed that unconstitutional direct action would harm Labour's electoral appeal.

He was elected to the London County Council (LCC) in 1922. Morrison quickly rose to the top of the London Labour Party, becoming its Chief Whip in 1923, and its leader in 1925.

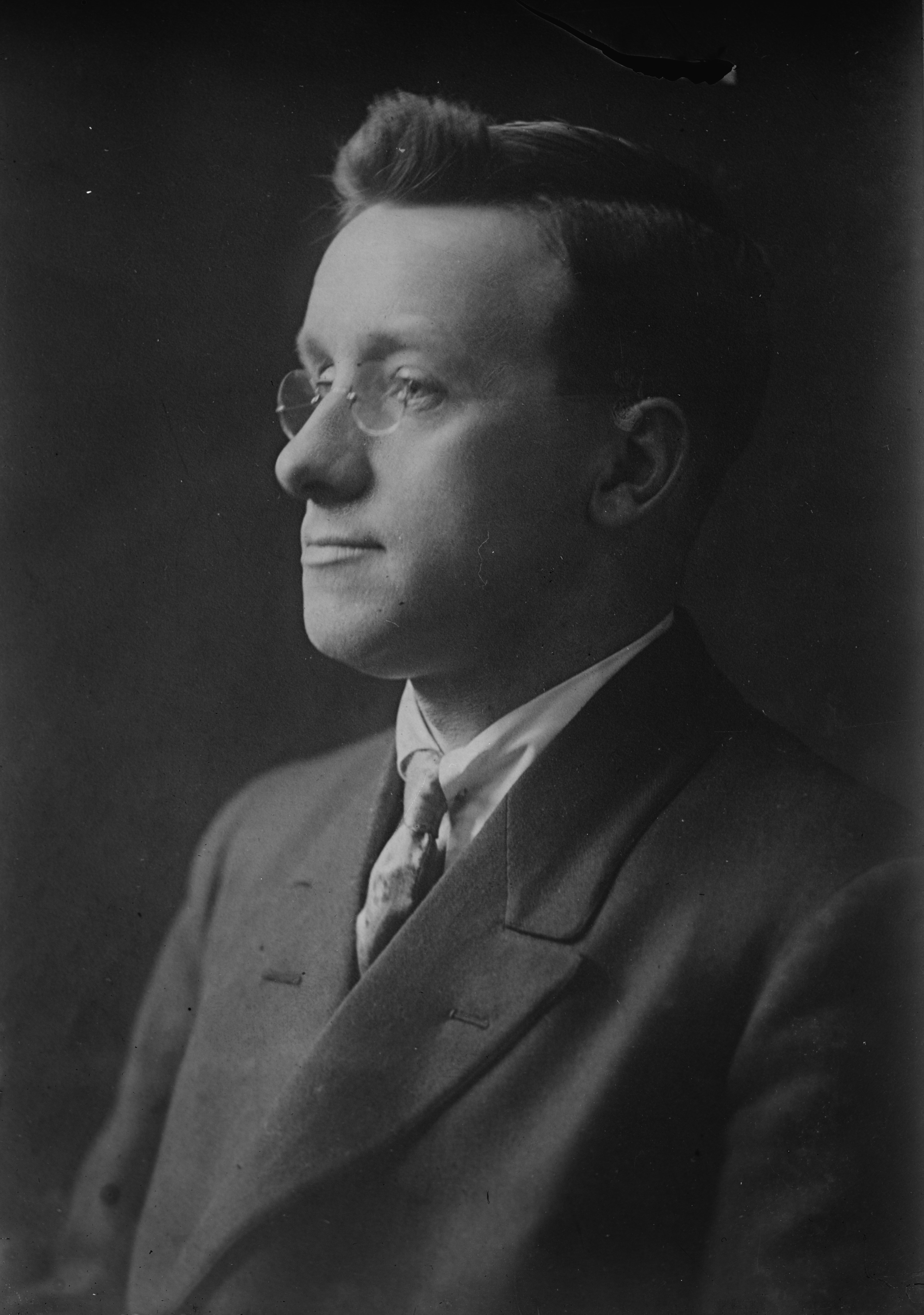
Morrison in the 1920s

=== National politics ===
He was elected to Labour's National Executive Committee in 1920. At the 1923 general election he became Member of Parliament (MP) for Hackney South. He was not offered a post in Ramsay MacDonald's short-lived first Labour government, and sat as a backbencher. He lost the seat again in October 1924 when Labour lost the general election.

Morrison was politically on the right wing of the Labour Party and was a fierce opponent of the Communist Party of Great Britain's attempts to affiliate with Labour. He argued that Communism was incompatible with the Labour Party's ethos of peaceful social transformation. He gained a reputation as the 'chief witchfinder' for his efforts to root out Communists from the party. He believed that Labour should have broad appeal across social classes, and appeal to middle-class voters as well as to its working-class base.

==== Minister of Transport, 1929–1931 ====
Morrison returned to Parliament in the 1929 general election, which returned a minority Labour government, and MacDonald appointed him Minister of Transport. In this role he modernised traffic law through the Road Traffic Act 1930. He also introduced legislation to unify London's public transport under a public body, the London Passenger Transport Board; although the Labour government collapsed in 1931 before the legislation could be passed, the Bill was passed largely unchanged by the subsequent National Government in 1933. Morrison voted with the majority of the cabinet to cut unemployment benefit in the crisis of 1931, and he lost his seat again in Labour's landslide defeat at the 1931 general election.

=== Leader of the London County Council, 1934–1940 ===
Morrison continued to sit on the London County Council, and in 1933 was re-elected to lead the Labour Group (his leadership having lapsed during his time as a minister). He wrote a book, Socialisation and Transport: the Organisation of Socialised Industries with Particular Reference to the London Passenger Transport Bill, which encapsulated his ideas on nationalisation. Managers would be appointed to run monopoly industries in the public interest. He did not, however, envisage democratic control by the workers.

Unexpectedly, Labour won a majority at the 1934 London County Council election and Morrison became Leader of the LCC. This made him the leader of the largest local authority in Britain, and the most powerful Labour figure in the country at the time, and gave him control of almost all local government services in London. His main achievements here included the creation of the Metropolitan Green Belt around the suburbs. He confronted the government over its refusal to finance the replacement of Waterloo Bridge; eventually the government agreed to pay 60% of the cost of the new bridge. The LCC made much progress in slum clearance and the construction of new housing estates during Morrison's tenure, so much so that he was said to have done "more to refashion the face of the City since Sir Christopher Wren". Improvements were also made to hospital and welfare services.

London Conservatives frequently accused him of seeking to "build the Tories out of London", the implication being that the LCC would deliberately build council houses in order to affect local voting patterns. His biographers, Bernard Donoughue and George W. Jones, have written that "Morrison never said or wrote" the words attributed to him.

Morrison was a pioneer in using the talents of women, and promoted women to chair various committees of the LCC. He promoted women to positions which they had never previously held, such as memberships of the Fire Brigade Committee and the Metropolitan Water Board.

==== 1935 leadership election ====
In the 1935 general election, Morrison was once again elected to the House of Commons and immediately challenged Clement Attlee for the leadership of the party in the leadership election. Although Morrison was widely seen as the favourite in many sections of the press and intelligentsia, he came second in the first ballot, and was defeated by a wide margin by Attlee in the final ballot. Many causes have been suggested for his defeat; one factor was the loyalty to Attlee which the MPs who had served in the previous Parliament had felt. Attlee had also led Labour through the 1935 general election which had seen Labour gain over 100 seats, and many MPs would have seen it as ingratitude to deprive him of the leadership. Another factor was Morrison's refusal to give a clear undertaking to give up his job at the LCC if elected leader. He was also widely distrusted by the left of the party. Both he and his supporter Hugh Dalton put some of the blame on the Masonic New Welcome Lodge, who, they claimed, backed the third-place leadership candidate Arthur Greenwood and then switched their votes to Attlee. After losing, Morrison declined to stand for the post of Deputy Leader, instead deciding to concentrate on his LCC work.

==== 1937 LCC election ====
He convinced Labour to adopt the new electioneering techniques that opponents had been using, especially using advertising agencies in the 1937 local elections. For example, he stressed housing, education and his own leadership with posters featuring Morrison alongside children and with a backdrop of new LCC flats above slogans such as "Labour Puts Human Happiness First", "Labour Gets Things Done" and "Let Labour Finish the Job". This strategy paid dividends, for Labour increased its majority on the LCC in the 1937 London County Council election.

In 1939, Conservative MPs defeated Herbert Morrison's Bill introducing "site value rating", a tax on similar lines to land value tax, in the old LCC area.

=== Wartime Coalition government, 1940–1945 ===
In May 1940, Labour joined the wartime coalition government under Winston Churchill, and Morrison was appointed as Minister of Supply, which put him in charge of procuring supplies for the army. Only a few months later, in October, Churchill moved him to the posts of Home Secretary and Minister of Home Security, succeeding John Anderson. Churchill chose Morrison for the roles because he was known and trusted by Londoners who were by that time enduring the Blitz.

His role as Home Secretary put him in charge of policing and justice, while his role as Minister of Home Security put him in control of all central and regional civil defence organisations, such as air raid wardens, rescue squads, fire services, and the Women's Voluntary Service. He was also responsible for giving approval to local ARP schemes and providing public shelters.

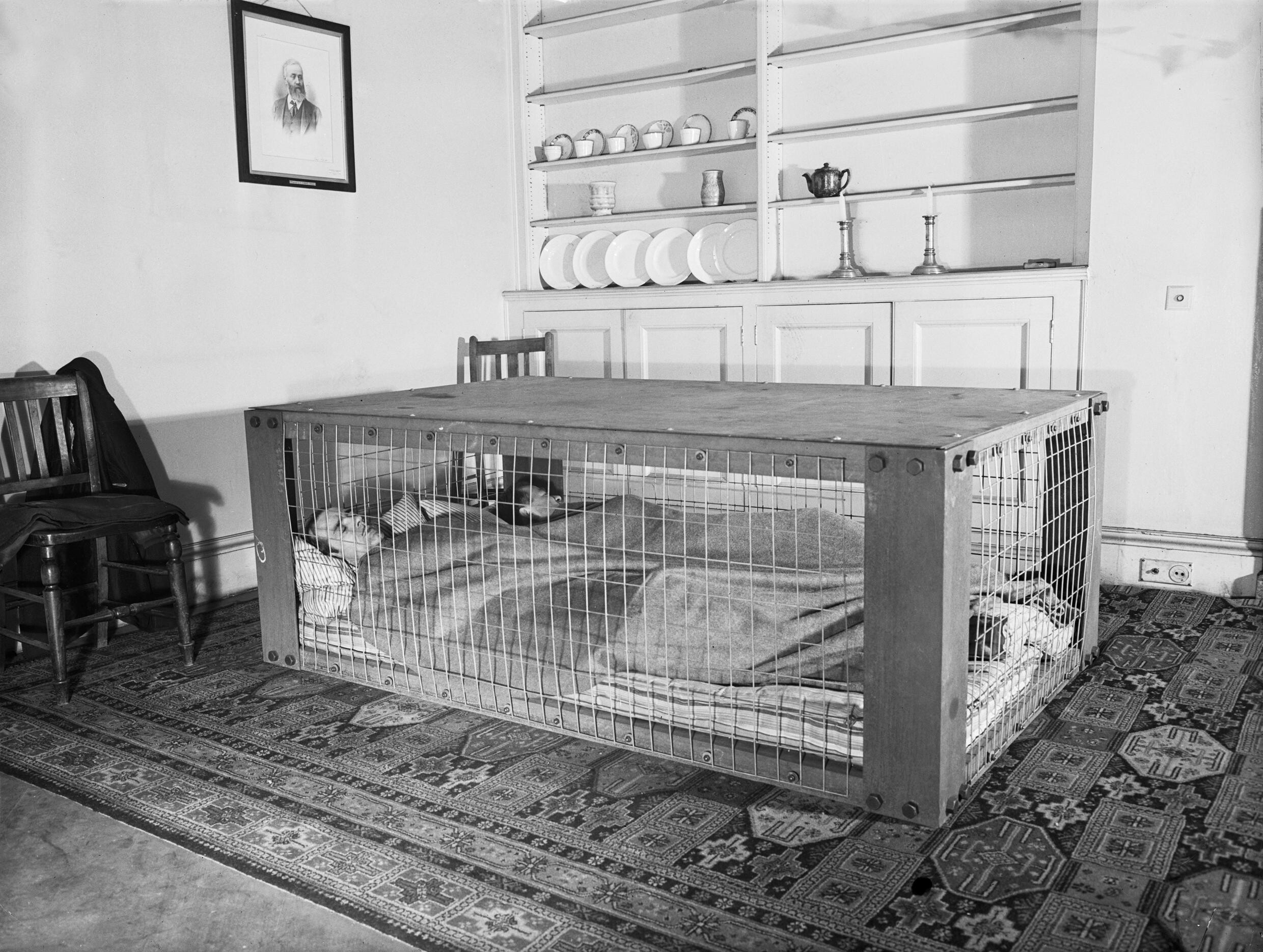
A Morrison shelter, named after Morrison who introduced them

The immediate task was in improving the provision of air raid shelters. Despite official disapproval, Londoners had been using deep shelters in London Underground stations and tunnels unofficially, without any proper organisation or facilities. Morrison immediately overturned the government's previous opposition to the use of deep shelters, and set about improving the conditions in them, with proper bedding, lighting, heating, sanitation and first aid being provided. He also oversaw the introduction of a type of indoor shelter which became known as the Morrison shelter.

Morrison introduced some improvements to the civil defence system, such as the recruiting of voluntary fire-watchers to help deal with incendiary attacks, and the creation in 1941 of the National Fire Service, which replaced the chaotic patchwork of local fire brigades.

As Home Secretary, Morrison had to balance civil liberties and freedom of speech with the wartime requirement for censorship and the need to maintain morale, as such he had to take many potentially unpopular and controversial decisions. Although Morrison retained a generally permissive stance towards press freedom, on 21 January 1941, he banned the Daily Worker for opposing war with Germany and supporting the Soviet Union. The ban lasted for a total of 18 months before it was rescinded.

The arrival of black American troops caused concern in the government, leading Morrison, the Home Secretary, to comment: "I am fully conscious that a difficult social problem might be created if there were a substantial number of sex relations between white women and coloured troops and the procreation of half-caste children." That was in a memorandum for the cabinet in 1942. In 1942, Morrison was confronted with an appeal from the Central British Fund for German Jewry (which subsequently renamed itself World Jewish Relief) to admit 350 Jewish children from Vichy France. Although Case Anton ensured the scheme's failure, Morrison had been reluctant to accept it beforehand, wanting to avoid provoking the "anti-foreign and anti-semitic feeling which was quite certainly latent in this country (and in some isolated cases not at all latent)".

In November 1942, he was promoted to Churchill's War Cabinet.

In 1943, Morrison made the controversial decision to release Sir Oswald Mosley, former leader of the British Union of Fascists from prison on health grounds. Mosley had been interred since May 1940 under emergency regulations, but suffered from phlebitis. He was released into house arrest under police supervision. The decision to release him caused an uproar of protest; however, after a fierce debate in the House of Commons, Morrison's action was upheld by a vote of 327–62.

In 1943, he ran for the post of Treasurer of the Labour Party but lost a close contest to Arthur Greenwood.

=== Labour government, 1945–1951 ===
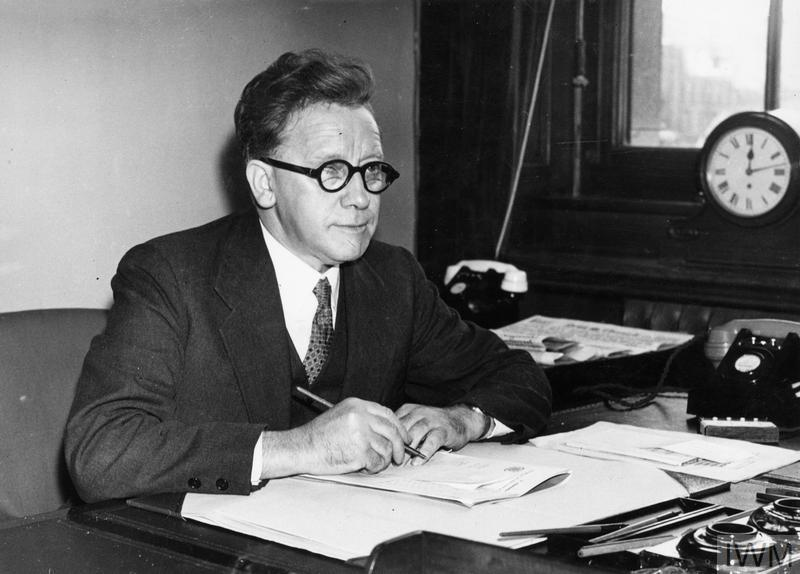
Morrison in 1945

==== 1945 general election ====
Following the end of the war, Morrison was instrumental in drafting the Labour Party's 1945 manifesto Let us Face the Future. He organised the general election campaign and enlisted the help of left-wing cartoonist Philip Zec, with whom he had clashed during the early stages of the war when, as Minister of Supply, he took exception to an illustration commenting on the costs of supplying the country with petrol. Labour won a massive and unexpected victory at the 1945 general election, Morrison having switched his own seat to Lewisham East.

==== Leadership manoeuvres ====
Morrison and his supporters Ellen Wilkinson, Maurice Webb and Harold Laski had made little secret of their desire for Morrison to lead the Labour Party instead of Clement Attlee. Despite winning the election under Attlee, on the verge of him going to Buckingham Palace to accept the invitation to form a government from King George VI, Morrison asked Attlee to delay going until a meeting had been held by the Parliamentary Labour Party to elect the leader. Attlee, at the urging of Ernest Bevin ignored this request, and went straight to the Palace, thus making his premiership a fait accompli. Morrison, however, did not let the matter rest, and the next day raised the matter of leadership again, and claimed incorrectly that a decision made in 1933 meant that the Parliamentary Labour Party would have to vote on the leadership before a government could be formed. It turned out on examination that this was based on a misinterpretation. Attlee was able to ignore the request, and went ahead and formed his government; he showed no resentment towards Morrison or Wilkinson, and appointed both to his cabinet.

==== In government ====
Although Morrison initially asked Attlee to be appointed as Foreign Secretary, he was instead persuaded to take the positions of Lord President of the Council and Leader of the House of Commons, which gave him responsibility for coordinating Labour's domestic programme. Whenever Attlee was away for any reason, Morrison stood in for him, and became the de facto deputy prime minister; although he never formally held that title, he did obtain the post of Deputy Leader of the Labour Party. Morrison supervised the major Labour programme of nationalising large sectors of industry. As Lord President he chaired the committee on the Socialization of Industries, and followed the model that was already in place of setting up public corporations – such as, in broadcasting, the establishment in 1927 of the BBC. The owners of corporate stock were given government bonds in exchange, and the government took full ownership of each affected company, consolidating it into a national monopoly. The management remained the same, only now they became public servants working for the government. For the Labour Party leadership, nationalisation was a method to consolidate national planning in their own hands.

Morrison believed that the new National Health Service (NHS) being set up by Aneurin Bevan should be run by local councils, rather than by a national body. Morrison argued that London had the best council-run hospitals in the country; however, Bevan won the backing of the prime minister, and his vision for a national NHS was realised.

In July 1946, Morrison, together with US ambassador Henry F. Grady proposed "The Morrison-Grady Plan", intended to resolve the Palestine conflict, calling for federalisation under overall British trusteeship. Morrison was a longtime sympathizer with Zionism, but the plan was ultimately rejected by both Palestinian Arabs and Zionists.

===== Foreign Secretary, 1951 =====
Following Ernest Bevin's resignation as Foreign Secretary in March 1951, Morrison took over his role, but did not feel at ease in the Foreign Office. Attlee later described his appointment as a 'bad mistake' and 'he had no idea he (Morrison) was so ignorant' when it came to foreign affairs. The main issue which arose during his tenure was the crisis which erupted in Iran, when its nationalist Prime Minister Mohammed Mosaddeq nationalised the Anglo-Persian Oil Company, Morrison advocated for military action in response, but his views were not shared by his cabinet colleagues. His tenure there of seven months was cut short by Labour's defeat in the 1951 general election in October, and he was appointed a Member of the Order of the Companions of Honour in November that year.

==== Festival of Britain ====
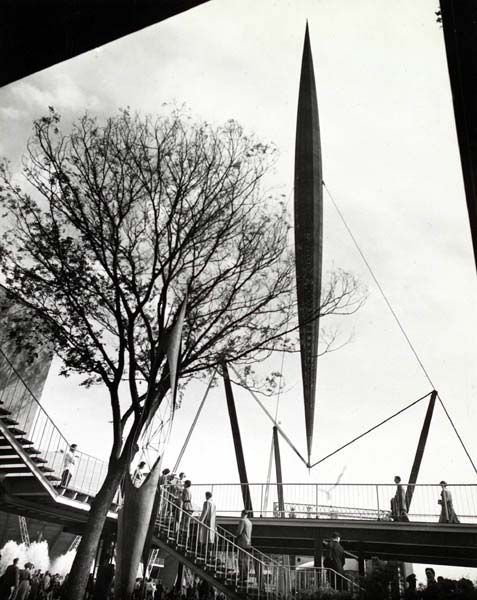
The 300-feet-tall Skylon at the Festival of Britain, 1951

While Morrison lacked a deep concern for foreign affairs, he was the prime mover and enthusiastic leader of the 1951 Festival of Britain, a major project whose planning began in 1947. The original goal was to celebrate the centenary of the Great Exhibition of 1851. However, the plans were changed. It was not to be another World Fair, and international themes were absent; even the Commonwealth was ignored. Instead, the Festival focused entirely on Britain and its achievements; it was funded chiefly by the government, with a budget of £12 million. The Conservatives gave little support. The Labour government was losing support, and the implicit goal of the festival was to give the people a feeling of successful recovery from the war's devastation, as well as promoting British science, technology, industrial design, architecture and the arts. Historian Kenneth O. Morgan says the Festival was a "triumphant success" as thousands:

flocked to the South Bank site, to wander around the Dome of Discovery, gaze at the Skylon, and generally enjoy a festival of national celebration. Up and down the land, lesser festivals enlisted much civic and voluntary enthusiasm. A people curbed by years of total war and half-crushed by austerity and gloom, showed that it had not lost the capacity for enjoying itself....Above all, the Festival made a spectacular setting as a showpiece for the inventiveness and genius of British scientists and technologists.

=== 1955 leadership election ===
Although Morrison had effectively been Attlee's heir presumptive since the 1930s, Attlee had always distrusted him. Attlee remained as Leader through the early 1950s and fought the 1955 election, finally announcing his retirement after Labour's defeat. Morrison was then 67, and was seen to be too old to embark on a new leadership role. During the leadership election, he was the interim Leader of the Labour Party. Although he stood, he finished last, by a wide margin, of the three candidates, with many of his supporters switching to Hugh Gaitskell, who won the election. Gaitskell asked Morrison to continue as Deputy Leader but he resigned, effectively ending his front-line political career. Ironically, Gaitskell predeceased Morrison by two years, dying in 1963.

=== Last years, 1955–1965 ===
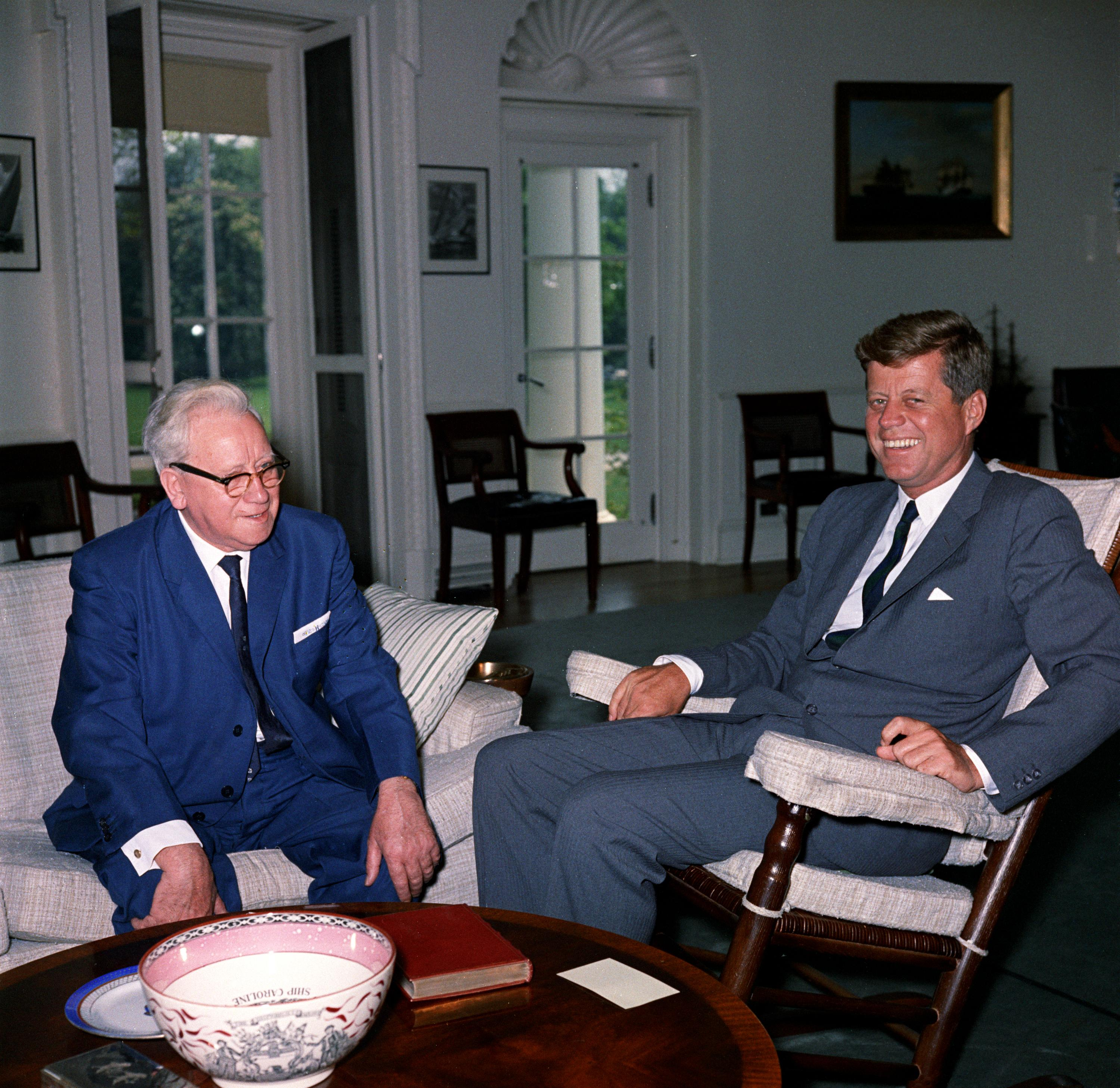
Morrison (left) meeting US president John F. Kennedy in 1962

During the Suez Crisis in 1956, Morrison advocated unilateral action by the United Kingdom against Egypt, following Colonel Nasser's seizure of the Suez Canal. Morrison stood down from Parliament at the 1959 general election and was made a life peer as Baron Morrison of Lambeth, of Lambeth in the County of London on 2 November 1959. He published his autobiography in 1960, although it was widely considered disappointing.

Morrison retained an active life well into his seventies. Between 1960 and 1965 he served as President of the British Board of Film Censors. In this role he undertook a tour of the United States in 1962, during which he visited Hollywood, and met the then US president John F. Kennedy. Towards the end of 1964, the eyesight in his one remaining eye began to fail, and the board decided not to renew his contract.

From 1961 to 1965, Morrison was Director of the FCI News Agency, an organisation reporting on events behind the Iron Curtain and run by exiles from Soviet regimes such as the journalist Josef Josten.

He remained politically active in the House of Lords until almost his death, his last major political battle in the early-1960s was a long and bitter campaign to prevent the London County Council being abolished and replaced by the much larger Greater London Council. This was ultimately unsuccessful as he failed to prevent the London Government Act 1963 from being passed.

== Personal life ==
Whilst working in a market garden in Letchworth during the First World War, Morrison met his first wife, Margaret Kent (1896–1953), a secretary and daughter of a railway clerk. The couple married on 15 March 1919. Kent was a shy woman who spoke with a stutter, and rarely made public appearances. Morrison's total involvement in politics meant that theirs was not a happy marriage; his later autobiography made no mention of Kent or their daughter, Mary (1921–2006). Morrison had a protracted affair with Labour MP and Minister Ellen Wilkinson, who died in 1947, although views differ as to whether this was a platonic or sexual relationship.

Following Kent's death in July 1953 from stomach cancer, Morrison married Edith Meadowcroft (b. 1908), a businesswoman of Conservative politics. The pair married on 6 January 1955 and their relationship appeared much more successful.

Morrison died from a stroke at Queen Mary's Hospital, Sidcup, on 6 March 1965, aged 77. His death occurred a few weeks before the London County Council was abolished, which he had campaigned against.

Morrison's grandson Peter Mandelson was a cabinet minister in the Labour governments of Tony Blair and Gordon Brown. Appointed British Ambassador to the United States in December 2024, Mandelson was stripped of the role by prime minister Keir Starmer in 2025.

== TV portrayal ==
Morrison was Foreign Secretary at the time of the defection of the double agents Guy Burgess and Donald Maclean. In Ian Curteis's 1977 Granada Television play Philby, Burgess and Maclean, Arthur Lowe appeared as Morrison – glowering to the camera in his final shot to show the opaque right lens of his spectacles.

== Bibliography ==
- Donoughue, Bernard; Jones, G.W. (2001). Herbert Morrison, Portrait of a Politician. Phoenix Press. ISBN 1 84212 441 2.

Parliament of the United Kingdom
Preceded by Clifford Erskine-Bolst	Member of Parliament for Hackney South; 1923–1924	Succeeded by George Garro-Jones
Preceded by George Garro-Jones	Member of Parliament for Hackney South; 1929–1931	Succeeded by Marjorie Graves
Preceded by Marjorie Graves	Member of Parliament for Hackney South; 1935–1945	Succeeded by Herbert Butler
Preceded by Sir Assheton Pownall	Member of Parliament for Lewisham East; 1945–1950	Constituency abolished
New constituency	Member of Parliament for Lewisham South; 1950–1959	Succeeded by Carol Johnson
Party political offices
Preceded by Fred Knee	Secretary of the London Labour Party; 1914–1947	Succeeded by Donald Daines
Preceded by Emil Davies	Leader of the Labour Party on London County Council; 1925–1929	Succeeded by Cecil Manning
Preceded by George Lansbury	Chair of the Labour Party; 1928–1929	Succeeded by Susan Lawrence
Preceded by Lewis Silkin	Leader of the Labour Party on London County Council; 1933–1940	Succeeded by Lord Latham
Preceded by Arthur Greenwood	Deputy Leader of the Labour Party; 1945–1955	Succeeded by Jim Griffiths
Political offices
Preceded by Wilfrid Ashley	Minister of Transport; 1929–1931	Succeeded by John Pybus
Preceded by William Ray	Leader of the London County Council; 1933–1940	Succeeded by Lord Latham
Preceded by Leslie Burgin	Minister of Supply; 1940	Succeeded by Andrew Duncan
Preceded by John Anderson	Home Secretary; 1940–1945	Succeeded by Donald Somervell
Preceded by John Anderson	Minister of Home Security; 1940–1945	Office abolished
Preceded by Lord Woolton	Lord President of the Council; 1945–1951	Succeeded by Viscount Addison
Preceded by Anthony Eden	Leader of the House of Commons; 1945–1951	Succeeded by Chuter Ede
Preceded by Ernest Bevin	Foreign Secretary; 1951	Succeeded by Sir Anthony Eden
Media offices
Preceded by Sidney Harris	President of the British Board of Film Censors; 1960–1965	Succeeded by David Ormsby-Gore
