= Charles Arthur Russell =

Charles Arthur Russell may refer to:

- Charles Russell, Baron Russell of Killowen (1832–1900), Irish statesman and jurist
- Arthur Russell (1951–1992), American musician
