= Timeline of the Abadan Crisis =

The Abadan Crisis was a major event in the history and development of modern Iran. The crisis began in 1951 after the Iranian government, under the democratically elected Prime Minister, Mohammad Mosaddegh, nationalized the British owned Anglo-Persian Oil Company, including the Abadan Refinery. In 1901, local Iranian sovereigns had sold an oil concession covering much of the country's southwest, to William Knox D'Arcy, by the time oil was discovered in commercial quantities in May 1908, D'Arcy was nearly bankrupt and sold his rights to the Anglo-Persian Oil Company in 1909. In the decades that followed the British profited immensely from the concession returns, local Iranians employees labored in often abysmal conditions while the APOC earned millions of pounds. The British hid the earnings of APOC from the Iranian government and refused to comply with the profit-sharing terms they had been agreed to.

The nationalization of the Anglo-Iranian Oil Company's assets namely oil refinery in Abadan infuriated the British Government who imposed a blockade of Iranian oil exports and began conspiring to overthrow the elected government. Eventually, the CIA orchestrated a successful coup in 1953, which enabled the Shah to rule autocratically for the next 26 years.

== Background ==
Year	Date	Event	Significance
1925		Mohammed Mosaddeq opposes coronation of Reza Shah.	Establishing a reputation for integrity.
1930s		Mosaddeq is hounded from public life by the powerful Reza Shah.	
1941		Reza Shah deposed during the Anglo-Soviet invasion of Iran and his son Mohammad Reza Shah is placed on the throne	Mosaddeq re-emerges as a popular hero.
1946–1949		The National Front, a coalition of parties and groups comes together with the goal of moving Iran's oil resources from British to Iranian control. Mosaddeq emerges in the leadership.	Marks the arrival in Iranian politics of an organized and sophisticated bloc opposed to British control of Iranian resources.
1946	March	Oil workers at Abadan strike for better housing, decent health care and enforcement of Iranian labor laws. British management brings in Arab and tribal strike breakers.	Raises awareness of workers' plight and British high handedness.
1949	May	Supplemental oil agreement offer by the British - guarantees royalty payments by AIOC "would not drop below 4 million pounds", a reduced area in which it would be allowed to drill, and a promise that more Iranians would be trained for administrative positions." But gives no "greater voice in company's management" or right to audit the company books. Prime Minister tried to argue with AIOC chairman, but chairman Fraser "dismissed him" and flies back to UK.	Arrogance of AIOC increases popular support for nationalization.
1950	Summer	New American ambassador Henry Grady arrives in Iran to a greeting of protests by thousands of Iranians. Several protesters are killed. Grady is unknown in Iran but serves as a supporter of Mosaddeq over the UK during the crisis.	Example of anti-Western and heavily politicized atmosphere at the time.
1950	Summer	General Haj Ali Razmara becomes prime minister.	Favorite of British, PM opposes nationalization.
1950	November 25	Supplemental Agreement rejected unanimously as inadequate by Mosaddeq-chaired parliamentary commission.	Nationalization gains further momentum.
1950	December, late	Word reaches Tehran of the Arabian American Oil Company deal to share profits with Saudis on a 50-50 basis. UK Foreign Office rejects idea of following suit. (p. 76-7).	Makes Supplemental Agreement look even worse to Iranians.
1951	January	Huge rally in Tehran to launch campaign to force nationalization of Anglo-Iranian Oil Company. National Front politicians are succeeded at the podium by a parade of mullahs issuing fatwas ordering support by Muslims for nationalization.	
1951	March 3	Razmara appears before majlis oil committee warning of illegality of nationalization, of the unpredictability of British retaliation, and of the potential devastation to Iran's economy from retaliation.	
1951	March 7	Prime Minister Razmara assassinated by Fadayan-e Islam. Majlis rejects Shah's choice for successor and three weeks later votes for Hussein `Ala as new PM.	Openness of Fadayan-e Islam and lack of any public sympathy for Rezmara intimidates politicians who oppose nationalization.
1951	March 15–20	Vote for nationalization of oil industry by Majlis and then Senate.	
1951	early April	Strikes and riots led by the communist Tudeh party protesting low wages and bad housing in oil industry and delays in nationalizing the oil industry. "Street demonstrations and sympathy strikes in Tehran, Isfahan, and the northern cities." Police in Abadan open fire, killing six workers. Britain sends gunboats "to protect British lives and property."	Mossadeq offered the premiership so that he could implement the nationalization law.

== Mosaddeq becomes prime minister ==
Year	Date	Event	Significance
1951	April 29	Mosaddeq voted Prime Minister. Basks in acclaim of "respect, devotion, loyalty" by Iranians. Cabinet is "noticeably conservative" with royalists included.	National Front and Mosaddeq's "main source of strength" is in "the streets" not in its parliamentary numbers.
1951	May 1	Shah signs law revoking Anglo-Iranian's concession and establishing the National Iranian Oil Company.	Nationalization official.
1951	May 26	The UK government lodges a formal complaint against Iran with the International Court of Justice. The court would rule in favor of Iran July 22, 1952.	
1951	June	Mosaddeq sends committee of five (including four National Front deputies) created by Majlis to Khuzestan to take over the oil installations" and implement the nationalization law.	Nationalization takes shape.
1951	July	Mosaddeq breaks off negotiations with AIOC when the latter threatens "to pull out its employees," and warns "tanker owners [that] the receipts from the Iranian government would not be accepted on the world market."	Confrontation escalates.
1951	July 15	US diplomat W. Averell Harriman arrives in Tehran to attempt to negotiate an end to the crisis; he is greeted by 10,000 protesters shouting "Death to Harriman". More than 20 people are killed and 2000 wounded in the protests. (p. 102)	Further escalation.
1951	August 22	British cabinet imposes a series of economic sanctions on Iran: Prohibits the export of key British commodities, including sugar and steel; directs the withdrawal of all British personnel from Iranian oil fields and all but a hard core of about 300 administrators from Abadan; and blocks Iran's access to its hard currency accounts in British banks.	Economic situation in Iran begins to deteriorate.
1951	September	AIOC evacuates its technicians and closes down the oil installations, while the British government reinforces its naval force in the Persian Gulf and lodges complaints against Iran before the United Nations Security Council.	
1951	October 19	Mosaddeq travels to the US to appear before the UN to present the Iranian case. After listening to both Mosaddeq and the British UN ambassador, the UN Security Council votes to `postpone discussion of the question to a certain day or indefinitely.`	"Humiliating diplomatic defeat" for the British.
1951	October 23	Mosaddeq travels to Washington DC to negotiate with US government and seek financial assistance from the World Bank.	Unsuccessful, no relief for Iran's economy.
1952	January? February?	Elections held despite lack of reform to exclude illiterates. "Realizing that the opposition would take the vast majority of the provincial seats, Mosaddeq stopped the voting as soon as 79 deputies - just enough to form a parliamentary quorum - had been elected." Mosaddeq asserts that `foreign agents` have been exploiting the election campaign with bribes to destabilize Iran, and thus `the supreme national interests of the country necessitate the suspension of elections."	Halt of vote counting is seen as a defense against subversive British agents by some, and "as undemocratic and grasping for personal power" by others.
1952	February	17th Majlis convenes. National Front, or pro-National Front, deputies occupy 30 out of 79 seats. Opposition harasses Mosaddeq "with side skirmishes" refusing to vote for special powers to deal with the economic crisis caused by the rapidly dwindling oil revenues", voice regional grievances against the capital. National Front, in turn, wages "a propaganda war against the landed upper class.".	
1952		With the departure of most foreign personnel, oil production falls from lack of maintenance and expertise. Oil boycott engineered by AIOC. Mosaddeq appeals to United States to mediate.	
1952	July	UK Royal Navy warships intercept Italian tanker Rose Mary after it leaves Iran and force it into the British protectorate of Aden on the grounds that the ship's oil was stolen property.	News of this scares off other customers and tanker owners, staunching the small flow of Iranian oil exports.
1952	July	Britain's boycott becoming devastatingly effective. Iranians "becoming poorer and unhappier by the day".	Mosaddeq's political coalition beginning to "fray", his enemies increasing in number.

== Mosaddeq resigns, is reinstated and wins emergency powers ==
Year	Date	Event	Significance
1952	July 16	Mosaddeq nominates his own War Minister. The Shah refuses to accept his nomination. Mosaddeq then resigns and appeals to the general public for support. After the Shah dismisses Mosaddeq and appoints another prime minister, the National Front—supported by the Tudeh—calls for protest strikes and mass demonstrations in favor of Mosaddeq.	Shift of power away from Shah who had traditionally controlled the ministry of war.
1952	July 21	1952 Iranian Uprising, Qiyam-e Siyeh-i Tir.: After five days of mass demonstrations, and 29 killed in Tehran, and "signs of dissension in the army," the Shah backs down and asks Mosaddeq to form a new government. Coincidentally, the final verdict in the case at the International Court of Justice is announced, supporting Iran's contention that the nationalization dispute is outside the court's jurisdiction.	Enormous personal triumph for Mosaddeq. Shah loses still more power.
1952	July 23	Mosaddeq asks majlis for "emergency powers for six months to decree any law he felt necessary for obtaining not only financial solvency, but also electoral, judicial, and educational reforms."	Capitalizing on the defeat of his opposition Mosaddeq deals "a rapid succession of blows ... not only at the Shah and the military but also at the landed aristocracy and the two Houses of Parliament.".
1952	August	Truman-Churchill joint communique issued, demonstrating America is in alliance with Britain. Calls for the amount of compensation for AIOC to be arbitrated. Mosaddeq responds with a demand for £50 million in compensation for underpayment by the British	Communique is "deeply damaging to Mosaddeq" as he can "not longer claim to be able to use [U.S.] against the British." Americans now closer to the British position that it is "impossible to do business with Mosaddeq."
1952	October	Mosaddeq "orders the British embassy shut" after learning of British plotting to overthrow him.	UK plans to overthrow Mosaddeq derailed.
1952	October 13	Gen. Abdolhossein Hejazi and three members of the Rashidian family are arrested for plotting against the government in association with a foreign (i.e. British) embassy. Gen. Hejazi was released shortly after and the Rashidians were released six weeks later.	Failure to crush anti-regime forces.
1952	October 23	General Zahedi, an anti-Mosaddeq conspirator goes underground after the Majlis declares the Senate dissolved, ending Zahedi's immunity from arrest. Zahedi has been meeting (conspiring) with British agents and Islamist leader Kashani.	Prospects for a coup now dim. "Britain has no intelligence agents in Iran" and Zahdi is "out of circulation." American Truman administration remains "implacably against the idea of intervention."
1953	January 20	Mosaddeq successfully presses Parliament to extend "emergency powers for another 12 months". With these powers, he decrees a land reform law that establishes village councils, and increases the peasants' share of production.	

== Opposition grows ==
Year	Date	Event	Significance
1953	mid-February	Mosaddeq works to limit Shah's power, demands "that the Shah confine himself to a government-designated budget", and give Crown properties to the state, or use them "for the public welfare, ... refrain from receiving government opponents ..."	Pre-emptive move against budding center of government opposition, arouses opponents such as Ayatollah Abol-Ghasem Kashani.
1953	February 28	Kashani mobilizes a clamorous pro-Shah crowd. A jeep carrying an army colonel and gang leader Shaban "the Brainless" Jafari smashes through the front gate of Mosaddeq's house. Mosaddeq is forced to flee in his pajamas over the back garden wall.	British diplomat reports that the mob`was certainly organized by former Mosaddegh supporter ... Kashani.`
1953	March 4–18	In the U.S., President Dwight D. Eisenhower, who has resisted the idea of a US instigated coup, comes "to the conclusion" that Iran is collapsing and that the "collapse could not be prevented as long as Mosaddeq" is in power. Others in his administration take "his change in tone as a sign that he would not resist the idea of a coup."	US planning for coup to remove Mosaddeq from office begins.
1953	March	Several former members of Mosaddeq's coalition began to turn against him. They include Muzzaffar Bazaui, head of the worker-based Toilers party; Hussein Makki, who had helped lead the takeover of the Abadan refinery and was at one point considered Mosaddeq's heir apparent; and most outspokenly Ayatollah Kashani, who damns "Mosaddeq with the vitriol he had once reserved for the British."	Defections reduce Mosaddeq's ability "to organize crowds in the streets." Result is "partly through the efforts" of Iranians working as British agents.
1953	April 4	$1 million given to the Tehran CIA station for use to `bring about the fall of Mosaddeq.`	
1953	April 19	Anti-Mosaddeq plotters kidnap Tehran police chief General Mahmoud Afshartus. He is killed by his captors as police close in. Zahedi, who will appoint himself the next prime minister, is implicated and takes refuge in the Majlis under Kashani's protection.	Iran shocked. Foe of coup eliminated. Plotters succeed in pushing Iran toward greater chaos.
1953	May	The Shah "is stripped of all powers he had recovered since [his father was deposed in] August 1941." His budget is cut, he is forbidden to communicate directly with foreign diplomats, royal lands are transferred back to the state, his sister is expelled from Iran, etc.	Competitor is weakened.
1953	May	Mosaddeq under siege, is losing support from erstwhile supporters in the bazaar and the army. The communist Tudeh party supports the government with "hard-knuckle tactics that employ thugs ... lawlessness."	As the National Front becomes weaker, the Tudeh party's support becomes more important to the government.
1953	June 14	In America, president Dwight D. Eisenhower approves the coup plot presented to him in `broad brush` outline by Director of Central Intelligence Allen Dulles.	
1953	June 25	Plans for the coup are laid out in detail at the U.S. State Department. Operation Ajax is given its final go ahead with unanimous vote.	Gray and black propaganda campaign begins attacking Mosaddeq as pro-Tudeh and anti-Islamic; working to destroying army morale and promoting economic collapse.
1953	July 1	Pro-Mosaddeq members managed to oust Kashani as Speaker by a 41–31 vote, but are not able to prevent a successful vote approving Hossein Makki as supervisor of the government's monetary policy.	Parliament effectively paralyzed.
1953	July 14	"National Front deputies resigned en masse, reducing the Majles below its quorum."	Effectively dissolves the 17th Majles, which had resisted Mosaddeq's bypassing of it with emergency powers to decree law.
1953	July 14–19	"Mosaddeq - supported by the Tudeh - calls for a national referendum" to dissolve parliament.	
1953	July 19	American coup organizer Kermit Roosevelt enters Iran, which is "aflame" with antagonism between pro and anti-Mosaddeq forces.	
1953	July 21	The communist Tudeh Party rallies against the Shah, against American imperialism and in favor of the Soviet Union. Rally draws a reported 100,000 demonstrators in Tehran. This far exceeds the 5000 supporters at an earlier National Front rally, which surprises and frightens non-communists.	One of the largest political demonstrations in Iran's history, suggests a shift in popular support to Communists.

== Referendum ==
Year	Date	Event	Significance
1953	July 29	Mosaddeq's cabinet decrees that referendum vote will have separately placed ballot boxes for yes or no ballots and "each ballot must be clearly inscribed with the full name of the voter and the number and place of issue of his identity card."	Abandonment of secret ballot is a violation of 1906 Constitution's insistence on a secret ballot.
1953	August 10	Yes wins with 99% approval, 2,043,300 vote to 1300 no votes. Mosaddeq now has authority to dissolve parliament.	"The transparent unfairness of this referendum [is] more grist for the anti-Mosaddeq mill."
1953	mid-August	Referendum gives Mosaddeq unprecedented powers, but government is weakened by dwindling oil revenues, increasing unemployment and rising consumer inflation.	Mosaddeq appears to be in full control but is losing his popular backing.

== Coup ==
Year	Date	Event	Significance
1953	Summer	Head of CIA, Allen Dulles, U.S. ambassador to Iran, Loy Henderson, and Princess Ashraf gather in Switzerland.	Meeting of conspirators.
1953	August 12	Colonel Nasiri flies to Ramsar on the Caspian Sea to get the Shah's signature on royal decrees dismissing Mosaddeq and appointing Zahedi in his place as prime minister.	A result of much effort by the CIA and allies to persuade the Shah to dismiss Mosaddeq.
1953	August 15–16	Failed coup attempt. Late at night "Colonel Nasiri of the Imperial Guards arrives at Mosaddeq's doorstep" with a number of Imperial Guards and "a royal decree replacing Mosaddeq with Zahedi as premier". Tipped off by the Tudeh's military network, a pro-Mosaddeq army contingent surrounds Nasiri and the coup fails.	With the planned coup a failure, CIA's Roosevelt chooses to stay in Iran and improvise another coup, and find another coup leader.
1953	August 16	Backlash against the coup attempt. Pro-Mosaddeq army units establish control throughout Tehran, arresting suspected coup participants. Freed from jail, Hossein Fatemi speaks on radio and to a large pro-Mosaddeq demonstration, denouncing the Shah as a traitor. His newspaper announces the Iranian people want the Shah hanged.	
1953	August 17	Shah flees Iran, stopping first in Baghdad. On hearing this news, the "National Front sets up a committee to decide the fate of the monarchy, and the Tudeh crowds pour into the streets, destroying royalist statues. In some provincial towns ... the Tudeh take over the municipal buildings." In Tehran, mob attacks are started by "black" mobs, i.e. paid for by the CIA to "loot shops, destroy pictures of the Shah, ransack offices of royalist groups", but include sincere supporters of Mosaddeq that have joined in the rioting.	Hurts Mosaddeq forces as they 1) mistakenly believe the Shah was behind coup, and with him gone, they relax their guard. 2) the disorder led many Iranians to believe Mosaddeq was losing control of the situation. 3) Mosaddeq reacted against calls for a republic as he saw them as going against his constitutional mandate as premier.
1953	August 18	Shah arrives in Rome without any money or entourage. In Tehran, riots have intensified and Mosaddeq instructs the army "to clear the streets of all demonstrators" following a (dishonest) promise by the American ambassador of "aid if law and order was reestablished."	Plotter takes advantage of Mosaddeq's trusting nature.
1953	August 19	'Shahban the Brainless' leads a noisy demonstration from the red light district to the bazaar; the gendarmerie transport 800 farm hands from the royal stables in Veramin to central Tehran. "The decisive day", people of the bazaar, led by athletes from gymnastic clubs, zurkhaneh, poured out en masse into the city and, supported by military loyal to the Shah, confronted and dispersed the military elements defending Mosaddeq. Many anti-Mosaddeq demonstrators are killed by military defenders as they attempt to overrun Mosaddeq's house, but in the afternoon General Fazallah Zahedi, commanding 35 Sherman tanks, surrounds the premier's residence. Nine-hour battle finally ends with 300 people dead, Mosaddeq fleeing, and his house burnt.	Counter-coup succeeds. George Lenczowski notes that it "was carried out with a more substantial participation of the Iranians themselves than has generally been acknowledged in the West", in spite of the US role in planning and financing the movement that supported the Shah.
1953	August 20	Mosaddeq is arrested and the Shah returns to Iran.	
1953	November–December	Mosaddeq is tried for treason, defends himself brilliantly and is given a three-year prison sentence.	
1957		Mosaddeq released from prison and confined to the village of Ahmad Abad, where his country estate is located. He spends the rest of his life running his farm, never leaving his estate compound.	

== See also ==
- Abadan Crisis
- International crisis
- National Front of Iran
- Mohammed Mossadeq
- 1953 Iranian coup d'état
