= Fellowship of Isis =

International spiritual organisation

- Abbreviation: FOI
- Formation: March 20, 1976
- Founder: Olivia Robertson; Lawrence Durdin-Robertson; Pamela Durdin-Robertson
- Type: Multi-faith spiritual organization

Fellowship of Isis logo, Aset Shemsu: retinue of Aset

The Fellowship of Isis (FOI) is a multi-faith spiritual organization focused on increasing awareness for the Goddess Isis. The Fellowship of Isis believes Isis best represents the energies of the dawning Aquarian Age. Despite worshipping pagan deities, the fellowship does not consider itself to be a Neopagan faith.

== History ==
The FOI was founded at Huntington Castle, County Carlow, Ireland at the Vernal equinox of 1976. The three co-founders were Olivia Robertson, her brother, Lawrence Durdin-Robertson (both are grandchildren of Thomas Herbert Robertson) and Lawrence's wife Pamela. They aimed to create a fellowship to "help the Goddess actively in the manifestation of Her divine plan." Olivia has described Isis as "God in female form." The FOI grew out of a "working group" created in 1963 called the Huntington Castle Centre for Meditation and Study. This Centre was active in gathering together various occult and theological figures such as Ross Nichols, Josephine and Mohun Lall, and Gerald Gough. The experiences shared within this group, along with the personal spiritual revelations and experiences of the three FOI co-founders led to the eventual founding of the Fellowship of Isis on the Vernal Equinox in 1976. From 1976 until the early 1990s, the group steadily grew.

In August 1993, the Fellowship of Isis was represented at the Parliament of the World's Religions at Chicago by Olivia Robertson and other member delegates. It is the first time that the Religion of the Goddess has been acknowledged as a world faith at this Parliament. The Parliament "became a showcase for the new religions in America, especially since mainstream Christianity was much underrepresented . . . Two feminist neopagan groups, the Covenant of the Goddess and the Fellowship of Isis, were among the sponsors of the parliament."

Custodianship of the Fellowship of Isis Foundation Centre is now under the aegis of the Durdin-Robertsons, heirs of the co-founders. In 2011, Olivia Robertson named her niece, Cressida Pryor, successor and FOI steward.

In October 2014, Cressida announced the Irish-based Circle of Brigid the "central parliament" and "executive board" of the Fellowship of Isis Foundation Centre, of which she is the overall adviser. The Circle of Brigid is also responsible for festivals at the Castle Centre in Ireland and has a subcommittee to sort ethics grievances.

The Fellowship is a globally organised religion, whose international and Internet presence is very large by comparison with its Irish base.

== Practices ==
"Over the past 30 years a body of liturgy has developed, detailing how the [Manifesto] principles can be practised by interested members through establishing a relationship between self and deity. Members are encouraged to express this spiritual relationship by enacting rituals, prayers and meditations, as detailed in the liturgy. This liturgy is drawn from the ritual structures of contemporary paganisms, Goddess spirituality and diverse archaeological scholarship into religious experience in the ancient world." The Liturgy of the Fellowship of Isis was written by Olivia Robertson, each ritual honouring different pantheons, and including a divinely channelled oracle encouraging spiritual communion with that Deity. These rites may be used for personal spiritual enhancement or, via instruction from a Fellowship of Isis centre, various degrees may be attained.

== Focus ==
The stated goal of the Fellowship of Isis is to support and promote the idea of the Divine Feminine. The Fellowship of Isis Manifesto sets out the basic principles of this society. The Fellowship accepts all religions and is not exclusivist. Members are free to maintain other religious allegiances. The good in all faiths is honoured. The Fellowship of Isis has no particular affiliations. It practices total religious tolerance, forbids sacrifice of any kind and discourages asceticism.

It is sometimes considered pagan, but co-founder Olivia Robertson stated in 2002: "We are happy to have thousands of Pagans among our 21,000 members in so many countries. But we also have Catholics, Protestants, Buddhists, Spiritualists and Hindus as members. All love and follow the religion of Isis of 10,000 Names."

All members in the Fellowship of Isis have equal privileges within it, and membership is free. Membership is open to anyone who wishes to join – once an individual has read through the Fellowship of Isis Manifesto and finds themselves in agreement with the principles laid out within it they become a member. There are no vows of secrecy. Members are free to resign at any time, if they so choose, and can rejoin again at a later time.

The Fellowship is dedicated to spreading the religion of all the Goddesses throughout this planet. The Gods are also venerated. The Goddess is seen as Deity, the Divine Mother of all beings, as well as the embodiment of Truth and Beauty. "The ecumenical nature of this nonprofit organization reveals itself in a membership that includes Protestants, Catholics, Jews, Hindus, Buddhists, Shintoists, Cabalists, Spiritualists, and Wiccan and pagan worshippers of all kinds."

FOI sub-groups, called "FOI Foundation Center Societies" or "Daughter Societies" of the Fellowship of Isis consist of the ‘College of Isis’ (Lyceums), the ‘Spiral of the Adepti’ (Iseums), the ‘Spiral of Alchemy’ (Solar Iseums), the 'Druid Clan of Dana' (Groves) and the 'Noble Order of Tara' (Priories). There are sub-chapters of these societies of the FOI in many major cities and countries around the world.

The Fellowship of Isis claims over 24,000 members in nearly a hundred countries. Members often blend their own traditions and beliefs with those offered by the Fellowship.

== See also ==
- Goddess movement
