= Frank Fredericks (musician) =

Frank Fredericks is the American founder and executive director of World Faith and co-founder of Religious Freedom USA.

He founded World Faith, an “interfaith community service organization,” in 2006, by developing an “action-based model” in New York City and exporting it to “conflict-prone regions” by empowering youth in Lebanon, India, Egypt, and Sudan.

== Education ==
Fredericks studied Music Business at New York University, and began working in the music industry, eventually managing Lady Gaga. He has also produced recordings and was the founder of the independent record label Çöñár Records.

Fredericks graduated with an MBA from the University of Oxford in 2016 where he was a Global Shaper Communities Scholar.

== Other works ==
Fredericks is a contributor to various blogs including the Huffington Post Religion section and speaks at events about interfaith issues, social entrepreneurship, and technology. He has been interviewed by various media outlets including Good Morning America, NPR, and New York magazine.

Mean Communications is a digital agency aimed to help impact organizations on branding, advertising, PR, and social media.

== Alumni ==
He is an alumnus of many organizations such as IFYC Germanacos Fellowship, Soliya Fellowship, AMENDS at Stanford, Ariane de Rothschild Fellowship, the YouthActionNet Fellowship, and has also been recognized by the World Economic Forum as a Global Shaper.
