= 1952 Iranian Uprising =

Revolt against the resignation Mohammad Mosaddegh

- Part of the Abadan Crisis
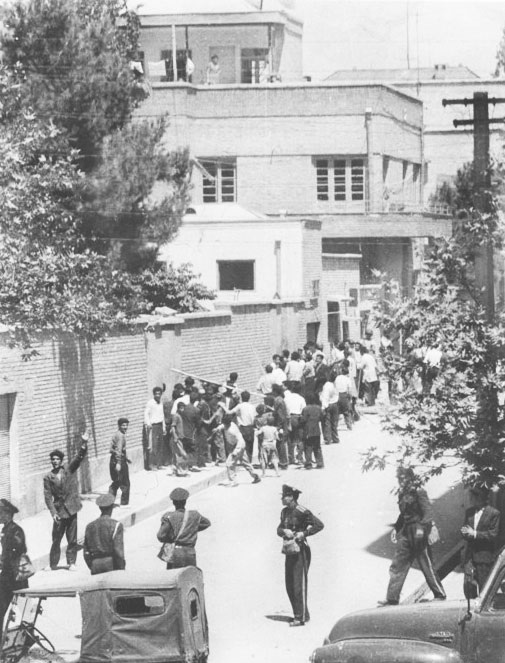
- Police and the demonstrators, 21 July 1952
- Date: 16–21 July 1952
- Location: Tehran, Iran
- Result: Pro Mosaddegh Victory

Parties
Imperial State of Iran; Shahrbani; Imperial Iranian Army	Pro Mosaddegh Protesters

The 1952 Iranian Uprising, more widely known as the July 21 Uprising (Persian: قیام ۳۰ تیر, Qiyam-e Si-ye Tir [qiˈʔɒːme siː je tiːr]) inside Iran, was a significant popular revolt that culminated on 21 July 1952, just five days after the resignation of Iran's Prime Minister Mohammad Mosaddegh.

On 16 July 1952, during the royal approval of his new cabinet, Mosaddegh asserted the Prime Minister's constitutional right to appoint the Minister of War and the Chief of Staff, a power that had previously been exercised by the Shah. The Shah refused, perceiving it as an attempt by Mosaddegh to strengthen his control over the government at the expense of the monarchy. In response, Mosaddegh resigned and appealed directly to the public for support, declaring that "in the present situation, the struggle started by the Iranian people cannot be brought to a victorious conclusion."

Veteran politician Ahmad Qavam (also known as Ghavam os-Saltaneh) was appointed as Iran's new Prime Minister. On the day of his appointment, he announced plans to resume negotiations with the British to resolve the oil dispute, reversing Mosaddegh's policy. In response, the National Front, along with various nationalist, Islamist, and socialist groups—including Tudeh—called for protests, the assassination of the Shah and other royalists, strikes, and mass demonstrations in support of Mosaddegh. Major strikes erupted in all of Iran's major cities, with the Bazaar in Tehran shutting down. Over 250 demonstrators in Tehran, Hamadan, Ahvaz, Isfahan, and Kermanshah were either killed or severely injured.

On the fourth day of mass demonstrations, Ayatollah Abol-Ghasem Kashani urged the people to launch a "holy war" against Qavam. The next day, Si-ye Tir (the 30th of Tir on the Iranian calendar and 21 July in the Gregorian calendar), military commanders withdrew their troops to barracks, concerned about the potential impact on their loyalty, and left Tehran under the control of the protesters. Alarmed by the unrest, the Shah requested Qavam's resignation and reappointed Mosaddegh to form a new government, giving him control over the Ministry of War as he had previously demanded. The Shah inquired if he should abdicate, but Mosaddegh declined.
