= Marjorie Graves =

British politician (1884–1961)

Frances Marjorie Graves

Member of Parliament for Hackney South
- In office 27 October 1931 – 25 October 1935
- Preceded by: Herbert Morrison
- Succeeded by: Herbert Morrison

Personal details
- Born: Frances Marjorie Graves; 17 September 1884 Allerton, Liverpool, England
- Died: 17 November 1961 (aged 77) Wareham, Dorset, England
- Party: Conservative
- Education: Château de Dieudonne, Bornel, France

Frances Marjorie Graves (17 September 1884 – 17 November 1961) was a British civil servant, Conservative politician and writer.

Graves was also a fellow of the Royal Historical Society and a great traveller.

== Early life ==
She was born in Allerton, Liverpool, and was the youngest daughter of William Graves and his wife Fanny Charlotte née Neilson. William Graves was a ship owner in the port whose father had been Conservative MP for Liverpool. The Graves family subsequently moved to Newells, Horsham, Sussex, where William became a Justice of the Peace. They also maintained a house in Brompton Square, London.

== Education ==
Marjorie had a private education, later schooling being carried out at Château de Dieudonne, Bornel, France. Her researches in the Bibliothèque Nationale and Archives Nationales in Paris led to her publications of three works.

== Career ==
=== Civil service ===
With the outbreak of war in 1914 she took up employment in the Foreign Office. She attended the post-World War I Paris Peace Conference, before transferring to the Intelligence Department of the Home Office.

=== Political career ===
Graves was politically a Conservative, and was a member of Holborn Borough Council from 1928 to 1934. She became the first female chairman of the Metropolitan Area of the National Union of Conservative and Unionist Associations in 1936.

In 1931 she was chosen as Conservative candidate for the parliamentary constituency of Hackney South, held by Labour cabinet minister Herbert Morrison. She succeeded in unseating Morrison to become the area's Member of Parliament. At the next general election in 1935 she was hopeful of retaining the seat, with her campaign centering on opposition to the use of Hackney Marshes for the building of council houses. She was, however, badly beaten, with Morrison returning to parliament with a large majority.

In 1936 she formed part of the British Government delegation to the League of Nations. In 1937 she was adopted as prospective candidate for Barnstaple, Devon. The next general election was, however, delayed until 1945 by the Second World War, and she did not contest the seat.

== Retirement ==
She retired to Wareham, Dorset, where she became a member of the county council. She was unmarried, and died in Wareham in November 1961.

== Interests ==
In 1932 and 1933 she was a vice-president of the Supporters Club of the Clapton Orient Football Club and worked closely with Herbert Morrison MP in support of Clapton Orient. Source: Neilson N. Kaufman, honorary historian Leyton Orient FC.

== Works ==
- Catalogue of the Loan Exhibition of relics of past and present wars, held at South Lodge, Horsham, 7 August 1916. By F. M. Graves. [With plates.] pp. ix. 62. G. P. Putnam's Sons: London & New York, 1917. 4º.
- Graves, Frances Marjorie. Quelques pièces relatives à la vie de Louis I., duc d'Orléans et de Valentine Visconti, sa femme. pp. xii. 310. 1913. Bibliothèque. Bibliothèque du XVe siècle. tom. 19. 1906, etc. 8º.
- Campan, Jeanne Louise Henriette. Mémoires sur la vie privée de Marie-Antoinette, reine de France. Memoirs of the Private Life of Marie Antoinette ... Third edition. Memoirs of the Private Life of Marie Antoinette, to which are added personal recollections illustrative of the reigns of Louis XIV, XV, XVI ... Also a memoir of Madame Campan by F. Barrière. A new edition, revised by F. M. Graves. With an introduction and notes by J. Holland Rose ... Illustrated with thirty plates [including portraits]. 3 vol. H. Young & Sons: Liverpool, 1917 [1916].

Parliament of the United Kingdom
Preceded by Herbert Morrison	Member of Parliament for Hackney South; 1931–1935	Succeeded by Herbert Morrison
