= Herbert Butler (politician) =

British politician

Herbert William Butler JP (30 January 1897 – 16 November 1971) was a British Labour politician.

Butler was the son of Frank Butler. He was educated at a London County Council elementary school, and served in the Royal Navy during World War I, from 1916 to 1919. as a stoker. Following the war he became involved in Labour politics, and in 1922 became agent for Herbert Morrison who was elected member of parliament (MP) for Hackney South at the 1923 general election. In the 1930s he was a leading opponent of Oswald Mosley's Blackshirt movement, which was active in the Hackney area.

He became a justice of the peace (JP) for London in 1929, and in 1934 he was elected to Hackney Borough Council. He was subsequently made an alderman and Mayor of Hackney in 1936/37. He remained a member of the borough council for more than thirty years, and was also a member of the North East Metropolitan Regional Hospital Board, chairman of the Hackney and Queen Elizabeth hospital group, and a freeman of the Borough of Hackney.

At the 1945 general election he was elected to succeed Herbert Morrison as MP for Hackney South, and held the seat until its abolition in 1955. From 1950 to 1951, Butler was Parliamentary Private Secretary (PPS) to the Civil Lord of the Admiralty, Walter "Stoker" Edwards. the Hackney South constituency was abolished at the 1955 general election, when Butler was elected as MP for the new constituency of Hackney Central. He held that seat until his retirement at the 1970 general election.

He died in St Leonard's Hospital, Shoreditch in November 1971, aged 74.

Parliament of the United Kingdom
Preceded by Herbert Morrison	Member of Parliament for Hackney South; 1945 – 1955	Constituency abolished
New constituency	Member of Parliament for Hackney Central; 1955 – 1970	Succeeded by Stanley Clinton-Davis
