= Mary Baptist Russell =

Nun, nurse, philanthropist, and educator (1829–1898)

Mary Baptist Russell RSM
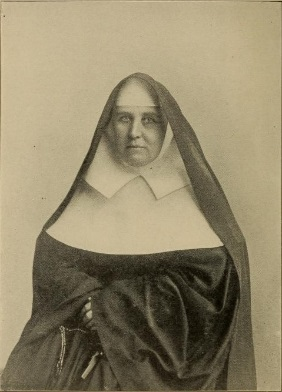
- Born: 18 April 1829; Seafield, Ballybot, Newry, County Down
- Died: 6 August 1898 (aged 69); San Francisco
- Other names: Katherine Russell; Mother Baptist

Mary Baptist Russell, RSM (18 April 1829 – 6 August 1898) was a Mercy Sister, nurse, philanthropist, and educator.

== Biography ==
Born Katherine Russell 18 April 1829 at Seafield in County Down she was the daughter of Arthur Russell and Margaret Mullan Hamill. Her father was a ship's captain turned Brewer. They had six children. Her mother had previously been Mrs Hamill and had already had six children from that marriage.

Russell was educated through both a governess and private schools in Newry. She was inspired by the Sisters of Mercy Convent in Kinsale who had taken up a mission of famine relief. Russell joined them by entering the convent on 24 November 1848, and on 2 August 1851 she had completed her profession. In 1854 Archbishop Joseph Alemany requested for Irish nuns to come to California. Nine nuns were selected and though young, Russell was chosen as the new mission's mother superior.

The nine set up their mission in San Francisco after arriving on 8 December 1854. Their convent opened on 2 January 1855. Their focus were the sick and poor of the city. During this time the Russell and her convent also started to set up schools. Their night school opened a month after the convent. They later opened a primary school each for boys and girls as well as an industrial school for girls. Their first attempt at working as nurses was turned down until there was an outbreak of cholera which came in September that year believed to have arrived on the ship Uncle Sam. Russell spent the next six months working with the cholera victims.

Russell borrowed money to buy the state Marine Hospital. She was prevented from using the hospital as a state service by the Know Nothing Party which claimed the existence of the hospital chapel was a violation of Church and State. Russell turned the hospital into St Mary's Hospital, California's first catholic hospital. Later Russell raised money to create a hospital on Rincon Hill which opened in 1861. Another epidemic swept the city in 1868, this time of smallpox.

Russell also arranged for the creation of a shelter for unemployed women in 1855, an asylum in 1861 and a home for the aged in 1872. The nuns also provided support for prison inmates. By 1863 Russell had founded another location in Grass Valley, California.

== Personal life ==
After leaving Ireland, Russell only returned once in 1878. She only saw one family member again, her brother, Charles Russell, in San Francisco in 1883. Russell began to suffer from strokes from 1891. She died 6 August 1898 in St Mary's Hospital.
