= Lewisham South =

Parliamentary constituency in the United Kingdom, 1950–1974

- Former borough constituency for the House of Commons

1950–February 1974
- Seats: one
- Created from: Lewisham East
- Replaced by: Lewisham East and Lewisham West

Lewisham South was a parliamentary constituency in Lewisham, London which returned one Member of Parliament (MP) to the House of Commons of the Parliament of the United Kingdom from 1950 until it was abolished for the February 1974 general election.

== Boundaries ==
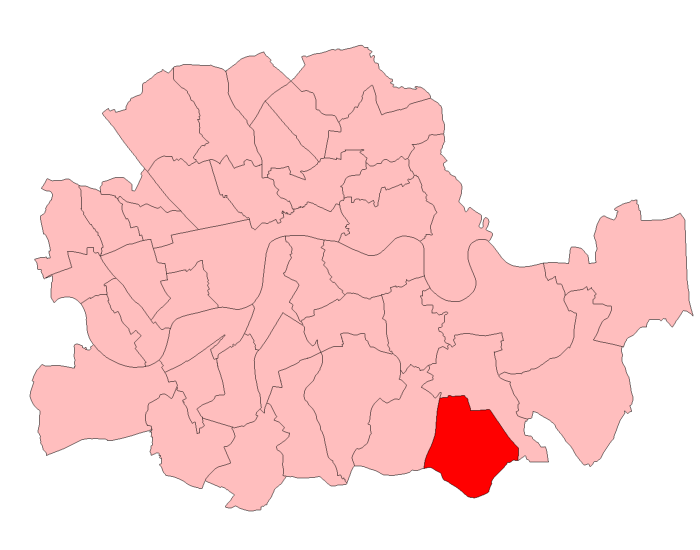
Lewisham South in the Parliamentary County of London 1950-74

The Metropolitan Borough of Lewisham wards of Bellingham, Catford, Downham, and Hither Green.

== Members of Parliament ==
Election	Member	Party
1950	Herbert Morrison	Labour
1959	Carol Johnson	Labour
Feb 1974	constituency abolished	

== Election results ==
=== Elections in the 1950s ===
General election 1950: Lewisham South
Party	Candidate	Votes	%	±%
Labour	Herbert Morrison	26,666	54.58	
Conservative	Frederick Gough	18,892	38.67	
Liberal	George William Rouse	2,665	5.45	
Communist	J. W. Jones	635	1.30	
Majority		7,774	15.91	
Turnout		48,858	86.51	
Labour win (new seat)				

General election 1951: Lewisham South
Party	Candidate	Votes	%	±%
Labour	Herbert Morrison	27,559	56.61	+2.03
Conservative	Charles Ross Hutchinson	20,548	42.21	+3.54
Communist	John Mahon	578	1.19	−0.11
Majority		7,011	14.40	−1.51
Turnout		48,685	85.36	−1.15
Labour hold		Swing	-0.75	

General election 1955: Lewisham South
Party	Candidate	Votes	%	±%
Labour	Herbert Morrison	23,821	55.79	
Conservative	John C Arnold	17,478	40.93	
Independent	John Loverseed	1,400	3.28	New
Majority		6,343	14.86	
Turnout		42,699	77.66	
Labour hold		Swing		

General election 1959: Lewisham South
Party	Candidate	Votes	%	±%
Labour	Carol Johnson	22,354	51.99	
Conservative	John Hunt	19,273	45.44	
Alert Party	George Forrester	788	1.86	New
Majority		3,081	7.55	
Turnout		42,415	78.60	
Labour hold		Swing		

=== Elections in the 1960s ===
General election 1964: Lewisham South Electorate
Party	Candidate	Votes	%	±%
Labour	Carol Johnson	20,078	52.46	
Conservative	Barney Hayhoe	12,486	32.63	
Liberal	Frank Bennett	5,706	14.91	
Majority		7,592	19.83	
Turnout		38,270	74.78	
Labour hold		Swing		

General election 1966: Lewisham South Electorate
Party	Candidate	Votes	%	±%
Labour	Carol Johnson	21,165	56.91	
Conservative	Gordon Dixon	11,247	30.24	
Liberal	Frank Bennett	4,779	12.85	
Majority		9,918	26.67	
Turnout		37,191	75.13	
Labour hold		Swing		

=== Elections in the 1970s ===
General election 1970: Lewisham South Electorate
Party	Candidate	Votes	%	±%
Labour	Carol Johnson	19,217	57.02	
Conservative	Gordon Dixon	13,665	40.55	
Independent	Diane Hart	821	2.44	New
Majority		5,552	16.47	
Turnout		33,703	65.74	
Labour hold		Swing		
