= Olivia Robertson =

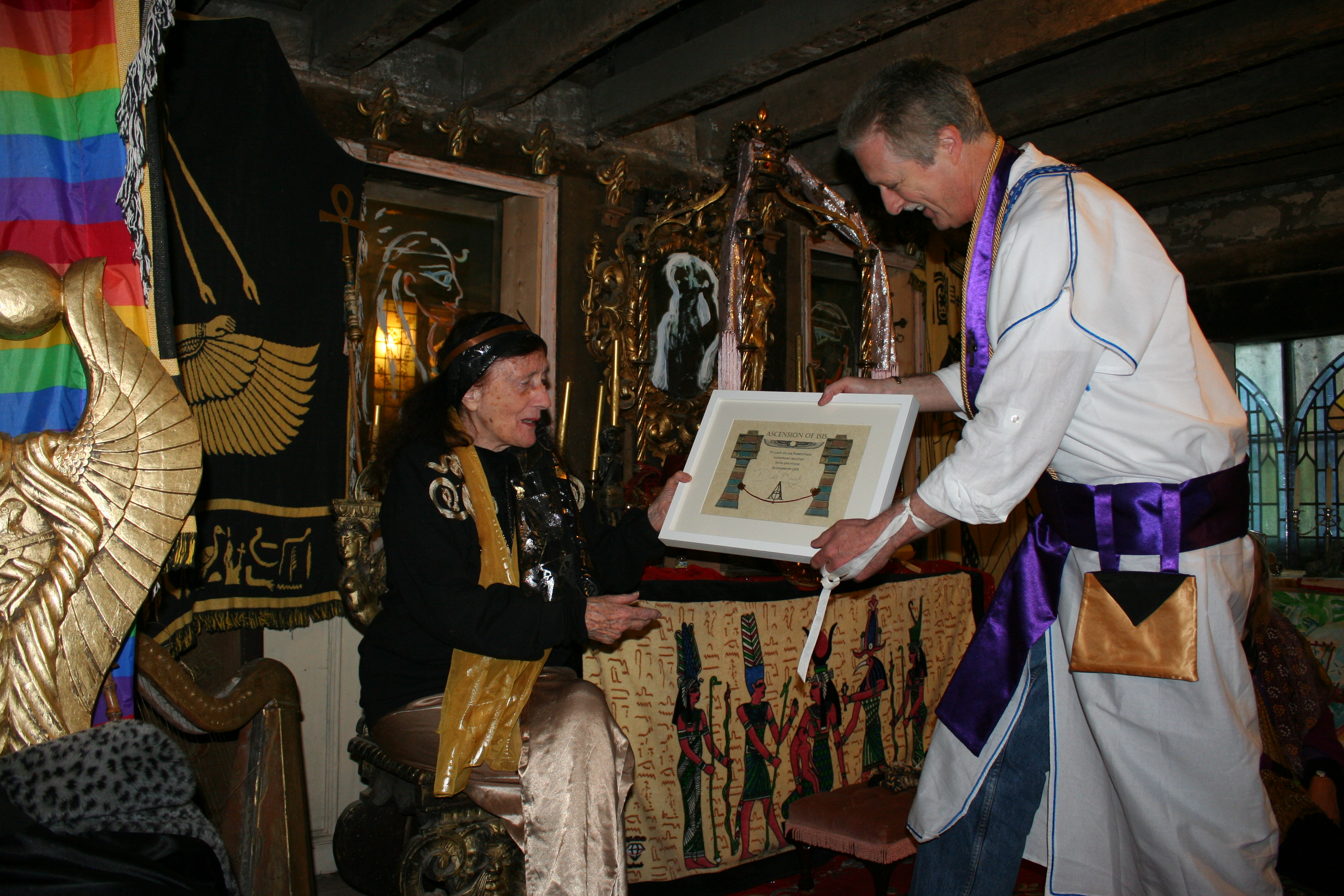
- Lady Olivia Robertson is conferred as an Honorary Ascendi of the Ascension of Isis by Reverend David de Roeck at the Temple of Isis, Clonegal Castle, Carlow, Ireland.
- Born: 13 April 1917; St Mary’s Hospital, London, England
- Died: 14 November 2013 (aged 96); Wexford, Ireland
- Occupations: Author, artist and priestess
- Known for: Fellowship of Isis

Olivia Melian Durdin-Robertson (13 April 1917 – 14 November 2013) was an author, artist, co-founder and high priestess of the Fellowship of Isis.

== Early life and education ==
Born at St Mary's Hospital in London, Olivia Robertson was descended from the theologian Richard Graves, a cousin of the author Robert Graves, and was a grandchild of Thomas Herbert Robertson. Her family roots descended from wealthy English Protestant rulers. She was the second of four children born to Nora and Manning Durdin-Robertson, an architect and town planner and a friend of the poet W. B. Yeats. Her family lived in Reigate in Surrey before moving back to their ancestral home Huntington Castle in Ireland, which had been inherited in 1925 on the death of her grandmother.

From 1938, Robertson was educated at Heathfield School, Ascot and the Grosvenor School of Modern Art. Her liking of the arts led her to have two art exhibits in the years 1939 and 1956 and even illustrated her own books.

Following the outbreak of World War II, although a pacifist she served as a V.A.D. nurse in Bedfordshire in 1940. She studied at University College Dublin in 1942, and then worked at Dublin Corporation until 1946. In 1946 she published her first book, St. Malachy's Court. Further books followed, including Field of the Stranger (1948), which was awarded the London Book Society's Choice award; The Golden Eye (1949), Miranda Speaks (1950), and It's an Old Irish Custom (1954). Her book The Dublin Phoenix (1956) sold out on its first day.

== Move to Huntington Castle ==
In 1960, Robertson moved back to Huntington Castle, the family home, with her brother, Lawrence Durdin-Robertson, and his wife Pamela. Huntington castle had been previously seized by the Irish Republican Army (IRA) to use as their headquarters around the year 1916 when the Anglo-Irish War was in its early beginnings. In 1963, she formed the Huntington Castle Centre for Meditation and Study with them. In 1976 the Fellowship of Isis (FOI) was founded.

She wrote her spiritual autobiography The Call of Isis in 1975, and also Isis of Fellowship, concerned with how the Fellowship of Isis was founded. On 30 April 1988 she appeared as a guest on After Dark, a British late night live discussion programme broadcast on Channel 4.

In August 1993 Robertson was invited to attend the World Parliament of Religions in Chicago. The FOI was chosen to represent the Goddess movement. Breakfasting there with the Dalai Lama remained one of the high points of her life. A film of her life, Olivia: Priestess of Isis, was released on DVD in 2011.

== Death ==
Robertson died in Wexford on 14 November 2013. Her funeral was a private ceremony held in the temple, organised by the Fellowship of Isis, followed by a public Church of Ireland service at St Fiacc's in Clonegal. An obituary was written in The Telegraph.

== Publications ==
- Field of the Stranger, 1948.
- St. Malachy's Court, 1947. ISBN 1-25891-794-7
- The Call of Isis, 1975. ISBN 0-95050-017-8
- Isis of Fellowship: How the Fellowship of Isis was Founded, 2002. ISBN 1-48406-781-9
- Ordination of Priestesses and Priests: of the Fellowship of Isis, 2013. ISBN 1-49100-607-2
