= Huntington Castle, Clonegal =

Castle in County Carlow, Ireland

Coordinates: 52.6898°N 6.6486°W

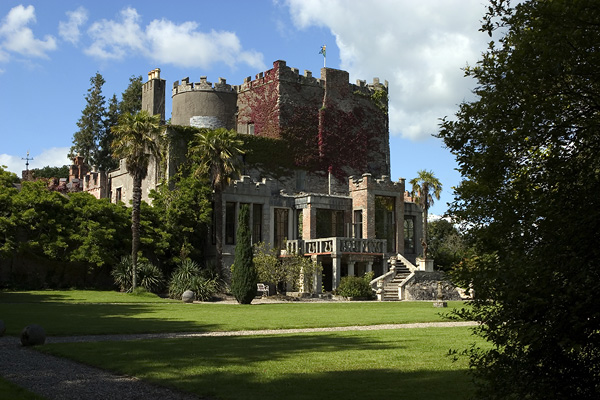
Huntington Castle

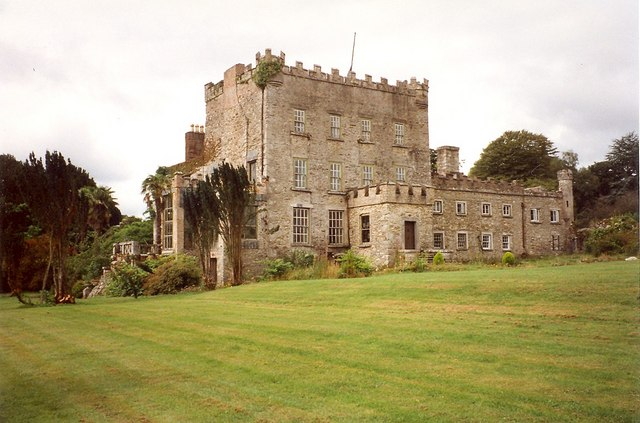
Huntington Castle

Huntington Castle, also known as Clonegal Castle, is a castle in Clonegal, County Carlow, Ireland, built in 1625.

It is now a private house open to the public for guided tours throughout June, July, August and September.

== History ==
The original tower house, which was used as a "plantation castle" during the plantation of that area in the early 17th century, was built in the 15th century as a stronghold for the Caviness family, an old Irish clan. Due to the strategic importance of the village of Clonegal during the Cromwellian conquest of Ireland because of its location on the road between Dublin and Wexford, the castle was captured and used as a garrison by Oliver Cromwell as he marched on Kilkenny in 1650.

The house was extended circa 1880 to include a seven bay two storey wing.

Huntington castle was seized by the Irish Republican Army (IRA) to use as their headquarters around the year 1916 when the Anglo-Irish War was in its early beginnings.

The house and grounds were redecorated by Manning Durdin Robertson in 1933 in a modern style including a new boat house, removal of battlements and reconstruction of the gateway.

It was the setting for Stanley Kubrick's film Barry Lyndon. Its basement has been the base of a religion, the Fellowship of Isis, since 1976, The castle hosted the Solas Festival in August 2008, co-founded by Olivia Robertson, her brother Lawrence Durdin-Robertson and his wife Pamela. The castle is now owned by Alexander and Claire Durdin Robertson.

== Gardens ==
The Esmonde family laid out most of the gardens in the 17th century. This includes the French limes on the Avenue, the parterre or lawns to the side of the house, the fish ponds on either side of the centre walk through the wilderness and the majority of yew trees which comprise the Yew Walk. Larger plantings have resulted in Huntington possessing a number of great Irish trees, including varieties of hickory, a cut leaved oak, Siberian crab and buckeye chestnut. A lake at the bottom of the wilderness was built for ornamental purposes but next to it is one of the earliest water turbine houses in Ireland, providing Huntington with its own electricity as early as 1888. The River Derry, which forms the boundary between Counties Wexford and Carlow, flows along the bottom of the wilderness, providing a pleasant setting for woodland walks.

== See also ==
- List of country houses in County Carlow
