= Hackney South =

Parliamentary constituency in the United Kingdom, 1885–1955

- Former borough constituency for the House of Commons

1885–1955
- Seats: one
- Created from: Hackney
- Replaced by: Bethnal Green and Hackney Central

Hackney South was a parliamentary constituency in "The Metropolis" (later the County of London). It was represented by nine Members of Parliament to the House of Commons of the Parliament of the United Kingdom, only two of whom, Horatio Bottomley and Herbert Morrison, were elected more than once.

== History ==
The constituency was created under the Redistribution of Seats Act, 1885 when the two-member Parliamentary Borough of Hackney was split into three single-member divisions. The seat, officially the Southern Division of the Parliamentary Borough of Hackney was first contested at the 1885 general election. The constituency was abolished in 1955.

== Boundaries ==
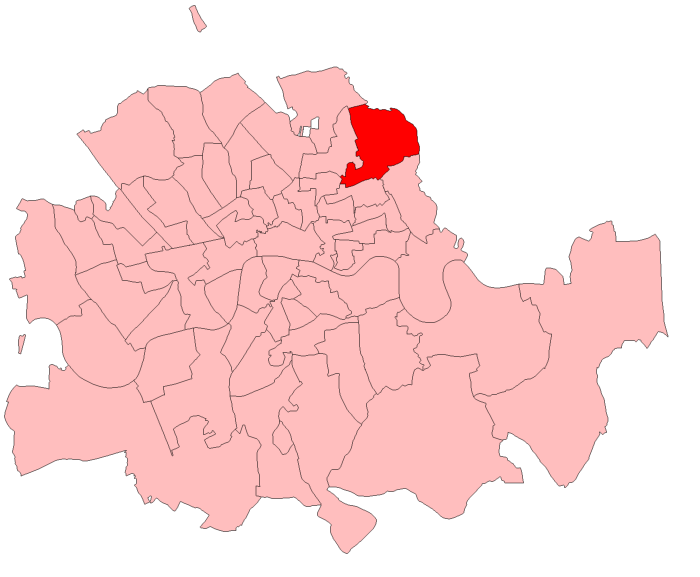
Hackney South in London 1885–1918

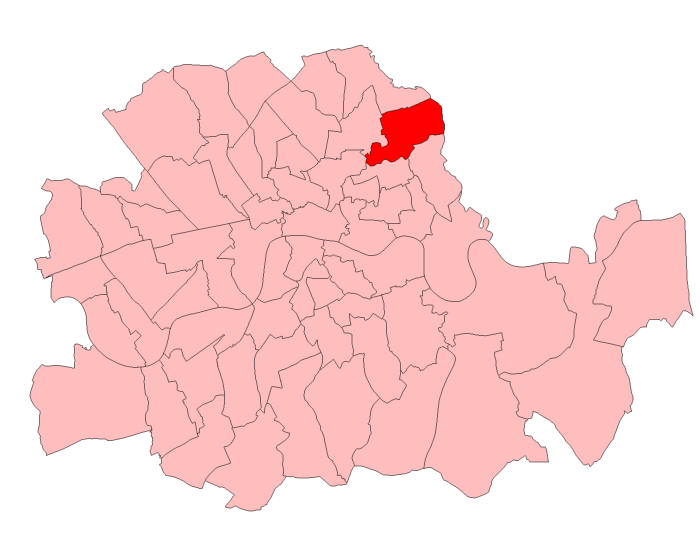
Hackney South in London 1918–1950

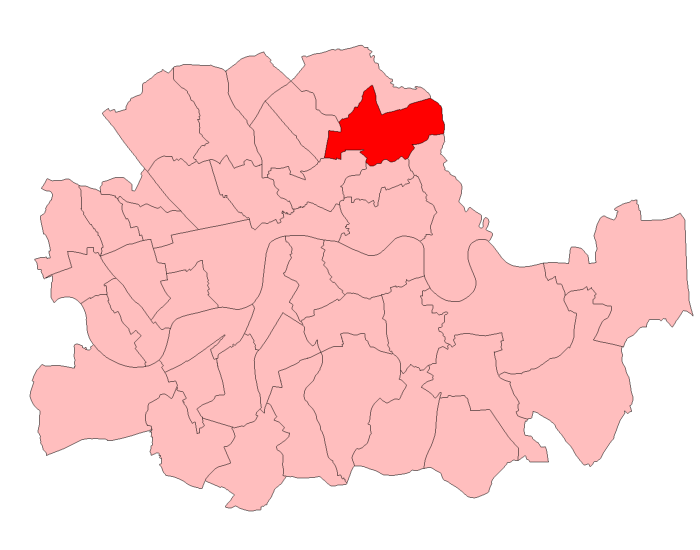
Hackney South in London 1950–1955

A map showing the wards of Hackney Metropolitan Borough as they appeared in 1916.

=== 1885–1918 ===
In 1885 the constituency was defined as consisting of:

- No. 7 or South Hackney Ward of Hackney Parish
- No. 6 or Homerton Ward of Hackney Parish
- The part of the No. 5 or Hackney Ward of Hackney Parish south of the centres of Everning Road, Upper Clapton Road, and the Upper and Lower Clapton Roads.

=== 1918–1950 ===
The Representation of the People Act 1918 redrew constituencies throughout Great Britain and Ireland. Seats in the County of London were redefined in terms of wards of the Metropolitan Boroughs that had been created in 1900. The Metropolitan Borough of Hackney was divided into three divisions, with the same names as the constituencies created in 1885. Hackney South was defined as consisting of:

- Homerton Ward
- South Hackney Ward
- The part of Clapton Park Ward to the south of a line drawn along the centres of Glenarm Road, Glyn Road and Redwald Road to its junction with Maclaren Street, thence across the recreation grounds in Daubeney Road to the borough boundary at a point fifty feet north of a boundary post situate at the junction of the Waterworks River with the River Lea at Lead Mill Point.

=== 1950–1955 ===
Under the Representation of the People Act 1948 the Boroughs of Hackney and Stoke Newington jointly formed two seats, the borough constituencies of Stoke Newington and Hackney North and Hackney South. Hackney South was enlarged: consisting of the Metropolitan Borough of Hackney except the five wards of Leaside, Maury, Southwold, Springfield and Stamford.

=== Redistribution ===
Following a review of constituencies by the Boundary Commission appointed under the House of Commons (Redistribution of Seats) Act 1949, parliamentary seats in the metropolitan boroughs of Bethnal Green, Hackney and Stoke Newington were redrawn. The Hackney South constituency was abolished, with most passing to a new Hackney Central borough constituency, and some parts to Bethnal Green.

== Members of Parliament ==
Election	Member	Party	Notes
1885	Sir Charles Russell	Liberal	later Baron Russell of Killowen
1894 by-election	John Fletcher Moulton	Liberal	later Baron Moulton
1895	Thomas Herbert Robertson	Conservative	
1906	Horatio Bottomley	Liberal	resigned 16 May 1912 after being declared bankrupt
1912 by-election	Hector Morison	Liberal	
1918	Horatio Bottomley	Independent	expelled 1 August 1922 after being convicted of fraud
1922 by-election	Clifford Erskine-Bolst	Conservative	
1923	Herbert Morrison	Labour	later Baron Morrison of Lambeth
1924	George Garro-Jones	Liberal	later 1st Baron Trefgarne
1929	Herbert Morrison	Labour	later Baron Morrison of Lambeth
1931	Marjorie Graves	Conservative	
1935	Herbert Morrison	Labour	later Baron Morrison of Lambeth
1945	Herbert Butler	Labour	
1955	constituency abolished		

== Elections ==
=== Elections in the 1880s ===
General election 1885: Hackney South
Party	Candidate	Votes	%	±%
Liberal	Charles Russell	3,544	57.7	N/A
Conservative	Charles Darling	2,602	42.3	N/A
Majority		942	15.4	N/A
Turnout		6,146	70.8	N/A
Registered electors		8,684		
Liberal win (new seat)				

Russell was appointed Attorney General for England and Wales, requiring a by-election.

Scoble

1886 Hackney South by-election
Party	Candidate	Votes	%	±%
Liberal	Charles Russell	3,174	61.4	+3.7
Conservative	Andrew Scoble	1,979	38.3	−4.0
Independent Liberal	Henry Munster	17	0.3	New
Majority		1,195	23.1	+7.7
Turnout		5,170	59.5	−11.3
Registered electors		8,684		
Liberal hold		Swing	+3.8	

General election 1886: Hackney South
Party	Candidate	Votes	%	±%
Liberal	Charles Russell	2,800	50.9	−6.8
Conservative	Charles Darling	2,700	49.1	+6.8
Majority		100	1.8	−13.6
Turnout		5,500	63.3	−7.5
Registered electors		8,684		
Liberal hold		Swing	−6.8	

=== Elections in the 1890s ===
Robertson

General election 1892: Hackney South
Party	Candidate	Votes	%	±%
Liberal	Charles Russell	4,440	57.4	+6.5
Conservative	Thomas Robertson	3,294	42.6	−6.5
Majority		1,146	14.8	+13.0
Turnout		7,734	70.0	+6.7
Registered electors		11,048		
Liberal hold		Swing	+6.5	

Russell is appointed Attorney General for England and Wales, requiring a by-election.

By-election, 1892: Hackney South
Party	Candidate	Votes	%	±%
Liberal	Charles Russell	Unopposed		
Liberal hold				

Russell is appointed Lord of Appeal in Ordinary, becoming Lord Russell of Killowen, causing a by-election.

Moulton

1894 Hackney South by-election
Party	Candidate	Votes	%	±%
Liberal	John Moulton	4,530	51.1	−6.3
Conservative	Thomas Robertson	4,338	48.9	+6.3
Majority		192	2.2	−12.6
Turnout		8,868	75.9	+5.9
Registered electors		11,688		
Liberal hold		Swing	−6.3	

General election 1895: Hackney South
Party	Candidate	Votes	%	±%
Conservative	Thomas Robertson	4,681	51.8	+9.2
Liberal	John Moulton	4,362	48.2	−9.2
Majority		319	3.6	N/A
Turnout		9,043	73.2	+3.2
Registered electors		12,360		
Conservative gain from Liberal		Swing	+9.2	

=== Elections in the 1900s ===
General election 1900: Hackney South
Party	Candidate	Votes	%	±%
Conservative	Thomas Robertson	4,714	51.9	+0.1
Liberal	Horatio Bottomley	4,376	48.1	−0.1
Majority		338	3.8	+0.2
Turnout		9,090	69.1	−4.1
Registered electors		13,146		
Conservative hold		Swing	+0.1	

General election 1906: Hackney South
Party	Candidate	Votes	%	±%
Liberal	Horatio Bottomley	6,736	57.1	+9.0
Conservative	Thomas Robertson	3,257	27.6	−24.3
Free Church and Progressive	William Riley	804	15.3	New
Majority		3,479	29.5	N/A
Turnout		10,797	89.9	+20.8
Registered electors		13,126		
Liberal gain from Conservative		Swing	+16.7	

=== Elections in the 1910s ===
General election January 1910: Hackney South
Party	Candidate	Votes	%	±%
Liberal	Horatio Bottomley	7,299	62.9	+5.8
Conservative	Conway Wertheimer	4,304	37.1	+9.5
Majority		2,995	25.8	−3.7
Turnout		11,603	82.2	−7.7
Liberal hold		Swing	−1.8	

General election December 1910: Hackney South
Party	Candidate	Votes	%	±%
Liberal	Horatio Bottomley	5,068	49.4	−13.5
Conservative	Sydney Charles Nettleton King-Farlow	3,243	31.6	−5.5
Independent Liberal	Richard Roberts	1,946	19.0	New
Majority		1,825	17.8	−8.0
Turnout		10,257	72.6	−9.6
Liberal hold		Swing	−4.0	

- Roberts was nominated by a breakaway local Liberal Association opposed to Bottomley, which was recognised by the London Liberal Federation.

Morison

1912 Hackney South by-election
Party	Candidate	Votes	%	±%
Liberal	Hector Morison	5,339	52.5	+3.1
Conservative	John Constant Gibson	4,836	47.5	+15.9
Majority		503	5.0	−12.8
Turnout		10,175	70.1	−2.5
Liberal hold		Swing	−6.4	

General election 1918: Hackney South
Party		Candidate	Votes	%	±%
	Independent	Horatio Bottomley	11,145	79.7	New
C	Liberal	Arthur Henri	2,830	20.3	−29.1
Majority			8,315	59.4	N/A
Turnout			13,975	55.4	−17.2
Registered electors			25,212		
	Independent gain from Liberal				
C indicates candidate endorsed by the coalition government.

=== Elections in the 1920s ===
1922 Hackney South by-election
Party	Candidate	Votes	%	±%
Coalition Unionist	Clifford Erskine-Bolst	9,118	50.2	New
Labour	Holford Knight	9,046	49.8	New
Majority		72	0.4	N/A
Turnout		18,164	56.3	+0.9
Registered electors		32,262		
Unionist gain from Independent		Swing	N/A	

General election 1922: Hackney South
Party	Candidate	Votes	%	±%
Unionist	Clifford Erskine-Bolst	14,017	60.2	N/A
Labour	Holford Knight	9,276	39.8	N/A
Majority		4,741	20.4	N/A
Turnout		23,293	70.0	+14.6
Registered electors		33,284		
Unionist gain from Independent		Swing	N/A	

General election 1923: Hackney South
Party	Candidate	Votes	%	±%
Labour	Herbert Morrison	9,578	42.8	+3.0
Liberal	George Garro-Jones	6,757	30.2	New
Unionist	Clifford Erskine-Bolst	6,047	27.0	−33.2
Majority		2,821	12.6	N/A
Turnout		22,382	65.8	−4.2
Registered electors		34,037		
Labour gain from Unionist		Swing	+18.1	

General election 1924: Hackney South
Party	Candidate	Votes	%	±%
Liberal	George Garro-Jones	13,415	53.5	+23.3
Labour	Herbert Morrison	11,651	46.5	+3.7
Majority		1,764	7.0	N/A
Turnout		25,066	72.5	+6.7
Registered electors		34,565		
Liberal gain from Labour		Swing	+9.8	

General election 1929: Hackney South
Party	Candidate	Votes	%	±%
Labour	Herbert Morrison	15,590	51.2	+4.7
Unionist	Sir Tresham Lever, 2nd Baronet	8,222	27.0	New
Liberal	Muriel Morgan Gibbon	6,302	20.7	−32.8
Communist	J. T. Murphy	331	1.1	New
Majority		7,368	24.2	N/A
Turnout		30,445	69.2	−3.3
Registered electors		43,997		
Labour gain from Liberal		Swing	+18.8	

=== Elections in the 1930s ===
General election 1931: Hackney South
Party	Candidate	Votes	%	±%
Conservative	Marjorie Graves	15,920	55.4	+28.4
Labour	Herbert Morrison	12,827	44.6	−6.6
Majority		3,093	10.8	N/A
Turnout		28,747		
Conservative gain from Labour		Swing		

General election 1935: Hackney South
Party	Candidate	Votes	%	±%
Labour	Herbert Morrison	15,830	59.3	+14.7
Conservative	Marjorie Graves	10,876	40.7	−14.7
Majority		4,954	18.6	N/A
Turnout		26,706		
Labour gain from Conservative		Swing		

General Election 1939–40

Another General Election was required to take place before the end of 1940. The political parties had been making preparations for an election to take place and by the Autumn of 1939, the following candidates had been selected;

- Labour: Herbert Morrison
- Liberal National:

=== Elections in the 1940s ===
General election 1945: Hackney South
Party	Candidate	Votes	%	±%
Labour	Herbert Butler	10,432	51.6	−7.7
National Liberal	Stanley Price	4,901	24.2	−16.5
Communist	William Rust	4,891	24.2	New
Majority		5,531	27.4	+8.8
Turnout		20,224		
Labour hold		Swing		

=== Elections in the 1950s ===
General election 1950: Hackney South
Party	Candidate	Votes	%	±%
Labour	Herbert Butler	35,821	61.0	+9.4
Conservative	Herbert P. Brooks	15,105	25.7	+1.5
Liberal	Frank Albert Marlow	5,575	9.5	New
Communist	John Richard Betteridge	1,891	3.8	−20.4
Majority		20,716	35.3	+7.9
Turnout		61,392	77.4	
Labour hold		Swing		

General election 1951: Hackney South
Party	Candidate	Votes	%	±%
Labour	Herbert Butler	39,271	66.5	+5.5
Conservative	Peter Rawlinson	18,003	30.5	+4.8
Communist	John Richard Betteridge	1,744	3.0	−0.8
Majority		21,268	36.0	+0.7
Turnout		59,018	77.1	−0.3
Labour hold		Swing		

== Sources ==
- Leigh Rayment's Historical List of MPs – Constituencies beginning with "H" (part 1)
