= Thomas Herbert Robertson =

British lawyer and politician

Robertson in 1895.

(Thomas) Herbert Robertson (26 April 1849 – 11 July 1916) was a British barrister and Conservative politician.

He was the only son of Thomas Storm Robertson, a physician and Fellow of the Royal College of Surgeons. Following education at Magdalen College, Oxford, from which he graduated in 1872, he studied law. He was called to the bar at Lincoln's Inn in 1878.

In 1880 he married Helen Alexandria Melian Durdin, co-heiress of Alexander Durdin of Huntington Castle, County Carlow, Ireland. The couple divided their time between the Irish estate (in 1899 Robertson was High Sheriff of Carlow) and their London home "The Cedars", South Hackney. They were well known for their philanthropic works in the Hackney area.

In 1892 a general election was called, and Robertson was selected as the Conservative candidate to contest the Hackney South constituency. He failed to unseat the sitting Liberal Member of Parliament and cabinet minister, Sir Charles Russell. Russell was elevated to the House of Lords in 1894, and Robertson was again Conservative candidate at the ensuing by-election. He narrowly failed to win the seat, reducing the Liberal majority to 192 votes.

Three years later a general election was held, and Robertson succeeded in taking the seat with a small majority of 319 votes. He was re-elected at the 1900 general election, by the slightly larger margin of 338 votes, but lost his seat in 1906, when a Liberal landslide saw him defeated by over 3,400 votes.

Robertson retired from politics and devoted himself to his Irish estate while maintaining a London home in Bedford Square. He died at his London residence in July 1916, aged 67.

His granddaughter was Olivia Robertson, an author, artist, co-founder and High Priestess of the Fellowship of Isis.

Parliament of the United Kingdom
Preceded by John Fletcher Moulton	Member of Parliament for Hackney South; 1895 – 1906	Succeeded by Horatio Bottomley
