= Carol Johnson (British politician) =

Carol Alfred Johnson, CBE (24 November 1903 – 30 July 2000) was a British Labour politician.

Johnson was educated at the School of Law, and the London School of Economics, before becoming a solicitor. After a period in private practice, he became an assistant town clerk. From 1943 to 1959, he was secretary to the Parliamentary Labour Party.

Johnson was elected to Lambeth Borough Council in 1937, serving until 1949. He was elected as Member of Parliament for Lewisham South from 1959, serving until the general election of February 1974, when the constituency was abolished by boundary changes.

Johnson was chair of the History of Parliament Trust. He was joint honorary secretary of the British Council of the European Movement, and was also active in the Ramblers' Association. He was made a Commander of the Order of the British Empire in 1951, and was also a Commander of the Order of Merit of the Italian Republic.
