= John Fletcher Moulton, Baron Moulton =

British politician

The Right Honourable The Lord Moulton GBE KCB PC FRS FRAS
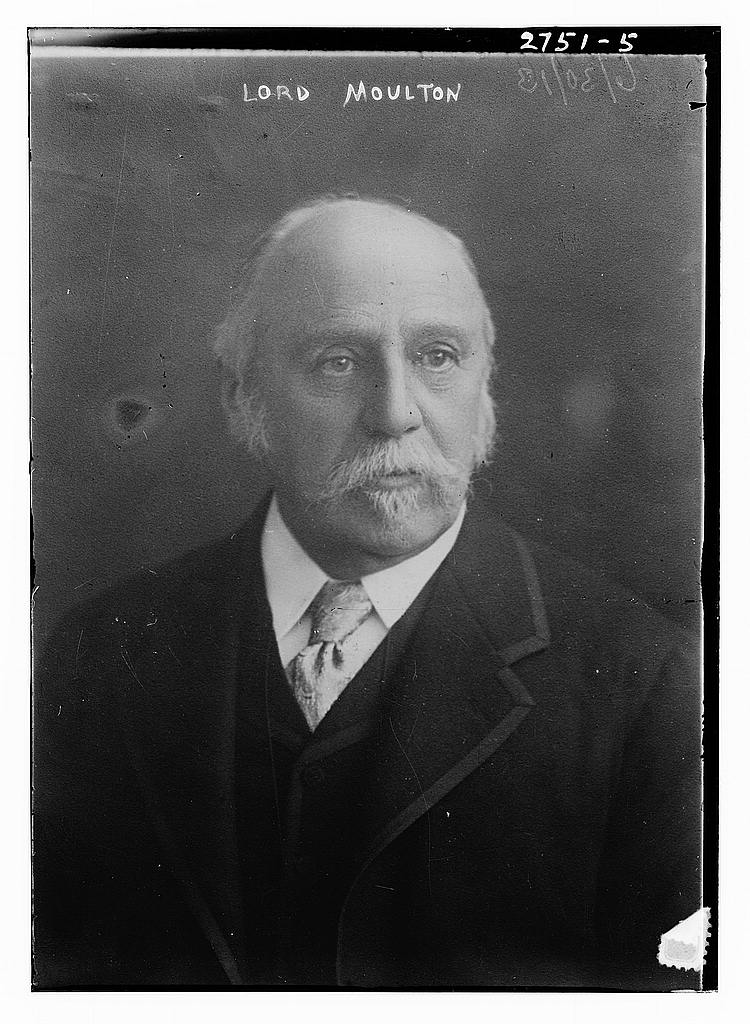
- Moulton, c. 1913

Lord of Appeal in Ordinary
- In office 1912–1921

Member of Parliament
- In office 1898–1906
- Preceded by: Thomas Owen
- Succeeded by: George Marks
- Constituency: Launceston
- In office 7 May 1894 – 1895
- Preceded by: Charles Russell
- Succeeded by: Thomas Herbert Robertson
- Constituency: Hackney South
- In office 1885–1886
- Preceded by: Constituency established
- Succeeded by: John Saunders Gilliat
- Constituency: Clapham

Personal details
- Born: John Fletcher Moulton; 18 November 1844 Madeley, Shropshire, England
- Died: 9 March 1921 (aged 76)
- Spouse(s): Clara Thomson (m. 1875; died 1888) Mary May Davis (m. 1901)
- Children: Hugh Moulton
- Education: St John's College, Cambridge

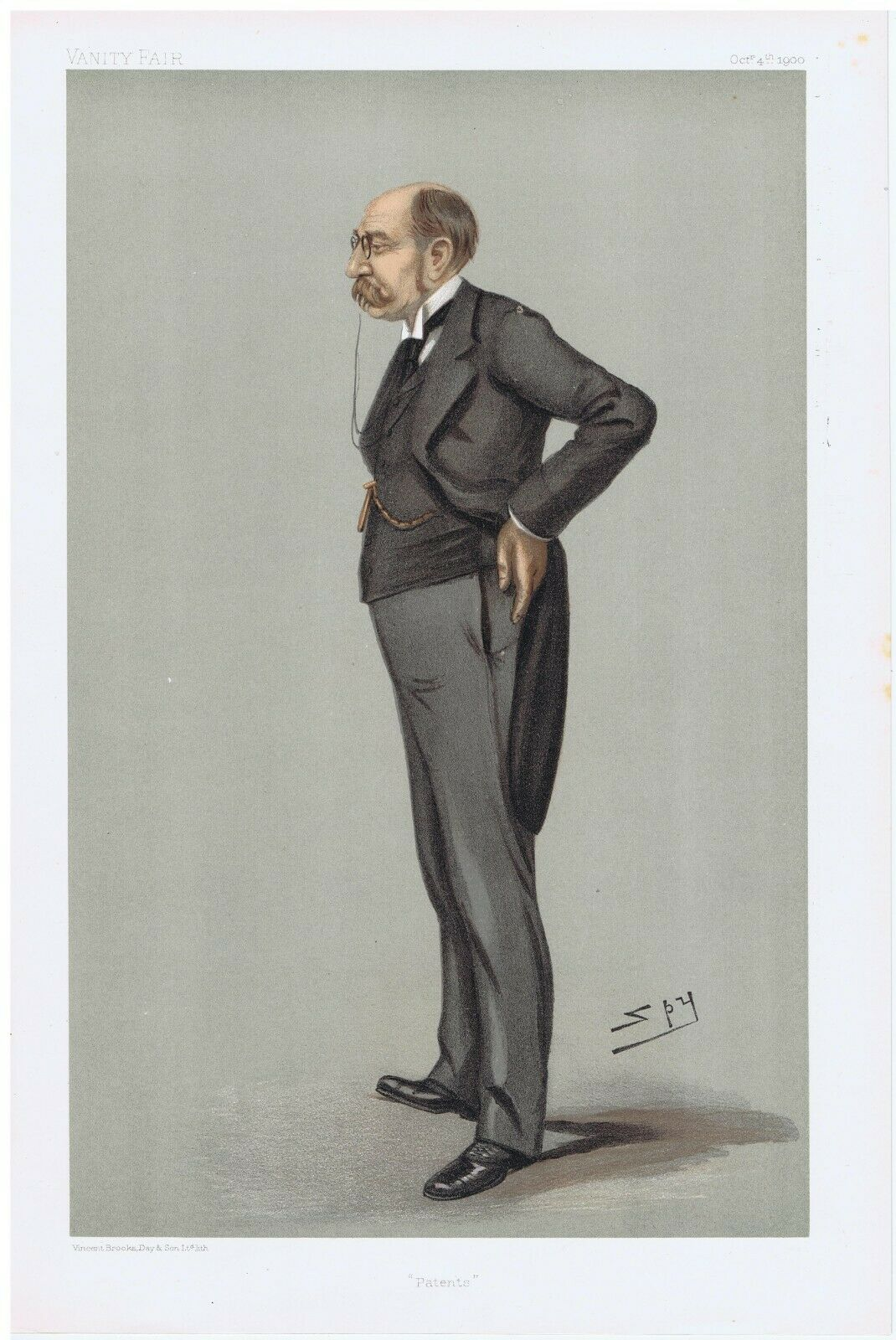
"Patents". Caricature by Spy published in Vanity Fair in 1900.

John Fletcher Moulton, Baron Moulton (18 November 1844 – 9 March 1921) was an English mathematician, barrister, judge and Liberal politician. He was a Cambridge Apostle.

== Early life ==
Moulton was born in Madeley, Shropshire, England, as one of six children of a scholarly minister of the Wesleyan Methodist Church, James Egan Moulton. He was sent to Kingswood School at the age of 11 where he excelled at academic subjects. He achieved the top marks in the Oxford and Cambridge Local Examinations and achieved a scholarship to St John's College, Cambridge, graduating Senior Wrangler in 1868 and winning the Smith's Prize. He was at one point judged to be one of the twelve most intelligent men in the United Kingdom.

== Career ==
After a brilliant mathematical career at Cambridge and election to a Fellowship, Moulton became a London barrister, specialising in patent law. He also experimented on electricity and was elected a Fellow of the Royal Society. A great advocate for medical research, he was the first chair of the Medical Research Council. He was awarded the French Legion of Honour for his work in establishing international units for measuring electricity.

Moulton also corresponded with Charles Darwin.

Moulton became a Liberal Party Member of Parliament successively for Clapham 1885–86, South Hackney 1894–95, and Launceston 1898–1906. He backed the attempts of Gladstone to solve the problems in Ireland through Irish Home Rule. In 1906 Moulton was made Lord Justice on the Court of Appeal and Privy Councillor. In 1912 he entered the House of Lords with a life peerage and the title, created on 1 October, Baron Moulton, of Bank in the County of Southampton.

The First World War gave Lord Moulton his greatest challenge. In 1914 he became chairman of a committee to advise on the supply of explosives, a difficult problem because the British had only a feeble organic chemistry industry. Before long Moulton became Director-General of the Explosives Department, first in the War Office and later in the Ministry of Munitions. He mobilised a brilliant group of administrators and scientists who expanded production more than 20-fold— throughout the war there was more explosives than shells to hold them. They also made fertilizers, and in 1917 became responsible for producing poisonous gases. Though loyal to orders, Moulton believed that poison gas was a departure from civilised warfare.

During the entire four war years Lord Moulton worked a ten-hour day and took less than ten days holiday. At weekends he drove about the country to inspect munitions plants and to locate sites for new ones. He was awarded the Knight Commander of the Order of the Bath in 1915, the Knight Grand Cross of the Order of the British Empire in 1917, the Etoile Noir of France, the Order of Leopold (Belgium) and was the last person to receive the Order of the White Eagle before the collapse of the Russian monarchy.

After the war, despite pressure to lead the expansion of the British chemical industry, he returned to his love: the law. He died in London on 9 March 1921.

In July 1924, The Atlantic published an impromptu speech Lord Moulton had given at the Authors' Club in London a few years prior to his death: "Law and Manners." In it, he addresses "the domain of Obedience to the Unenforceable."

== Family ==
He married Clara Thomson née Hertz (born c.1836) widow of Robert William Thomson) on 24 April 1875. She died in 1888. His second marriage, on 20 May 1901 in Naples, was to Mary May Davis (born 10 February 1870 in Massachusetts). He had one child from his first marriage (Hugh Lawrence Fletcher Moulton 1876-1962), and one daughter, Sylvia, by his second marriage. He also had two stepsons and two stepdaughters, all from his first marriage. During 1904 his two stepdaughters mounted a legal action against him, arguing that in his capacity as executor of their mother's will, he had not paid to them various monies left to them by their mother in that will. The judgment in the Chancery Court handed down in June 1905 supported Moulton's contention in his defence that it was legitimate for him to claim that an unwritten agreement existed under which he was entitled to deduct money for the step-daughters' board and keep during the period they were living under his roof. In March 1906 the Appeal Court overturned that judgment and found against Moulton.

== Arms ==
Coat of arms of John Fletcher Moulton, Baron Moulton
| Crest Upon a Mount a Lamb statant proper holding in the mouth a Trefoil slipped Vert the whole between four Ears of Wheat stalked and leaved two on either side also proper Escutcheon Gules four Bars per pale Argent and Or two Flaunches of the third each charged with a Sun of the field |

== See also ==
- Rev. Dr. James Hope Moulton, nephew
- Rev. Dr. William Fiddian Moulton, brother
- Rev. Dr. James Egan Moulton, brother
- Dr. Richard Green Moulton, brother
- Rev. James Egan Moulton Jr, nephew

== Notes ==
Parliament of the United Kingdom
| New constituency | Member of Parliament for Clapham; 1885 – 1886 | Succeeded by John Saunders Gilliat |
| Preceded by Sir Charles Russell | Member of Parliament for Hackney South; 1894–1895 | Succeeded by Thomas Herbert Robertson |
| Preceded by Thomas Owen | Member of Parliament for Launceston; 1898–1906 | Succeeded by Sir George Marks |
