= World Faith =

World Faith is an international NGO founded in 2008 by Frank Fredericks. The organization’s stated mission is to end religious violence. World Faith mobilizes religiously diverse young people to address religious violence.

The organization is based in New York City, but oversees seven chapters in just as many countries. The countries World Faith operates in as of 2020 include: Burundi, Gambia, India, Indonesia, Malawi, Nigeria, Pakistan, and the United States. Local chapters focus on a range of issues determined by local communities, such as education, public health, and women's issues.

== Achievements ==
In 2010, World Faith was recognized by the United Nations Alliance of Civilizations Forum as one of nine "most innovative organizations best positioned to promote intercultural dialogue."

As of the World Faith 2016 Annual Report, the organization had 668 volunteers and has accumulated 39, 506 hours of volunteer work, in the entire span of the organization there has been a total of 5,000 volunteers and 300,000 hours of service. In the same year, it has been shown that there has been a 10% increase in volunteers who identify as women, raising the number to 49%. In 2016 World Faith operated 11 schools in five countries, serving more than 2,500 students.
