= Abadan Crisis =

Oil crisis in Iran from 1951 to 1954

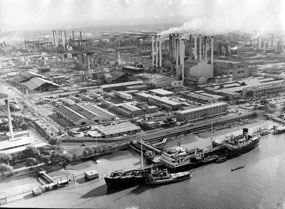
Anglo-Iranian Oil Company in Abadan

The Abadan Crisis (Persian: بحران نفتی ایران, romanized: Bohrân-e Nafti-ye Irân, lit. 'Iran Oil Crisis') occurred from 1951 to 1954, after Iran nationalized the Iranian assets of the BP controlled Anglo-Iranian Oil Company (AIOC) and expelled foreign companies from oil refineries in the city of Abadan.

== Prelude ==
The AIOC was the United Kingdom's "single largest overseas asset" and a "source of national pride" in the British post-war era of Clement Attlee and Ernest Bevin. Even as late as the "1940s and early 1950s some high British officials still believed that Persian petroleum was actually and rightly British petroleum because it had been discovered by the British, developed by British capital, and exploited through British skill and British ingenuity."

In stark contrast, Iranian Premier Mohammad Mosaddegh believed the 1933 concession granted to the AIOC by Iran was "immoral as well as illegal". Mosaddegh "challenged every aspect of the British commercial presence in Iran". The British feared that if Mosaddegh's policies prevailed, "nationalists throughout the world could abrogate British concessions with impunity."

== Nationalization ==
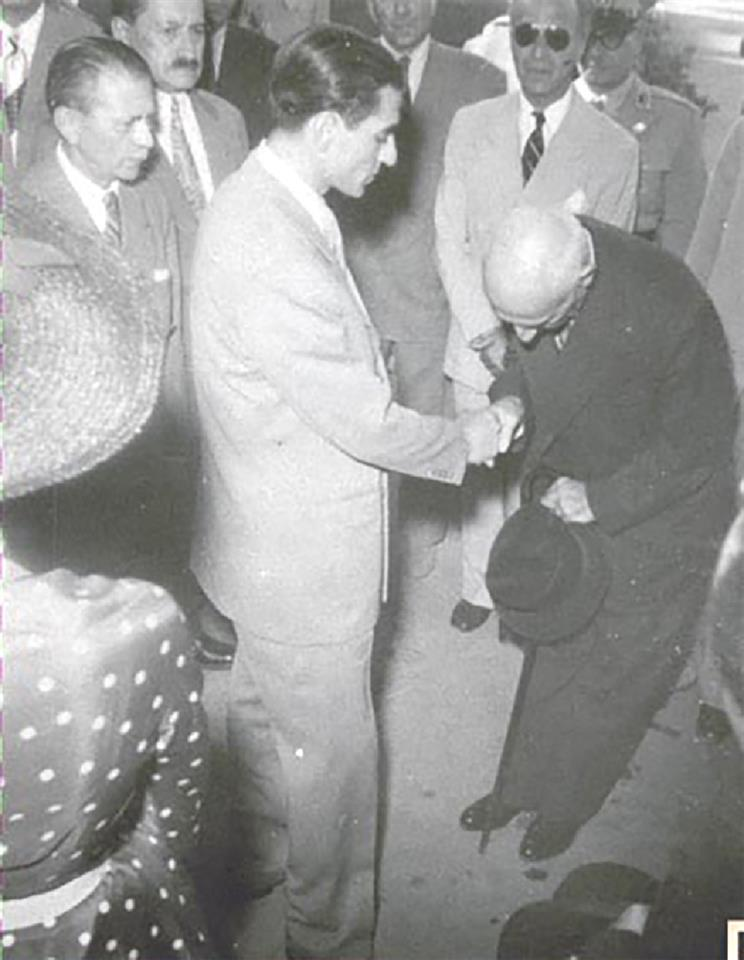
Prime minister Mohammad Mosaddegh shaking hands with Shah Mohammad Reza Pahlavi

The AIOC was nationalized by the Iranian Parliament in March 1951. This was enormously popular among Iranians, who saw the move as a long overdue staunching of the bleeding of its national wealth, which could then be harnessed as a tool to fight poverty nationally. In Britain, the nationalisation was widely seen as an intolerable breach of contract or theft. British emissaries in the United States argued that allowing Iran to nationalise the oil company "would be widely regarded as a victory for the Russians" and would also "cause a loss of one hundred million pounds per annum in the United Kingdom's balance of payments, thus seriously affecting our rearmament program and our cost of living."

British warships blockaded Abadan. On 22 August, the British cabinet imposed a series of economic sanctions on Iran. It prohibited exports of key British commodities, including sugar and steel, directed the withdrawal of all British personnel from Iranian oil fields and all but a hard core of about 300 administrators from Abadan and blocked Iran's access to its hard currency accounts in British banks.

After the withdrawal of the British workers in the autumn of 1951, the Iranians felt confident that they could easily hire non-British technicians to run the industry and then quickly train their own nationals to replace them. This did not prove to be the case: the United States, Sweden, Belgium, the Netherlands, Pakistan, and West Germany all refused to make their technicians available to the nationalized Iranian industry. Only Italy agreed, demonstrating that most industrialized countries supported Britain over Iran in the nationalization dispute.

In July 1952, the Royal Navy intercepted the Italian tanker Rose Mary and forced it into the British protectorate of Aden on the grounds that the ship's petroleum was stolen property. News that the Royal Navy was intercepting tankers carrying Iranian oil scared off other tankers and effectively shut down oil exports from Iran.

== Coup d'état ==
The prime minister, who was selected by the Shah and approved by the Majlis, was overthrown on 19 August 1953, following a coup d'état orchestrated by the United Kingdom and the United States. During the coup, codenamed Operation Ajax, the CIA and MI6 restored Mohammad Reza Pahlavi to power. In August 1954, the AIOC was set under the control of an international consortium. Initially, ownership shares in the consortium proposed to be divided along the following lines: 40% to be divided equally (8% each) among the five major American companies with BP to have a 40% share, Shell 14% and CFP 6%. Iran now received 25% of the profits compared to 20% of the original treaty with the AIOC. Saudi Arabia and other oil-exploiting countries of the region received up to 50% of the profits in cooperation with American oil companies at the same time.

== See also ==
- International crisis
- National Front (Iran)
- Timeline of the Abadan Crisis
- British occupation of Bushehr
- Nissho Maru Incident
