= Charles Russell, Baron Russell of Killowen =

Irish statesman and Lord Chief Justice of England

The Right Honourable The Lord Russell of Killowen GCMG PC
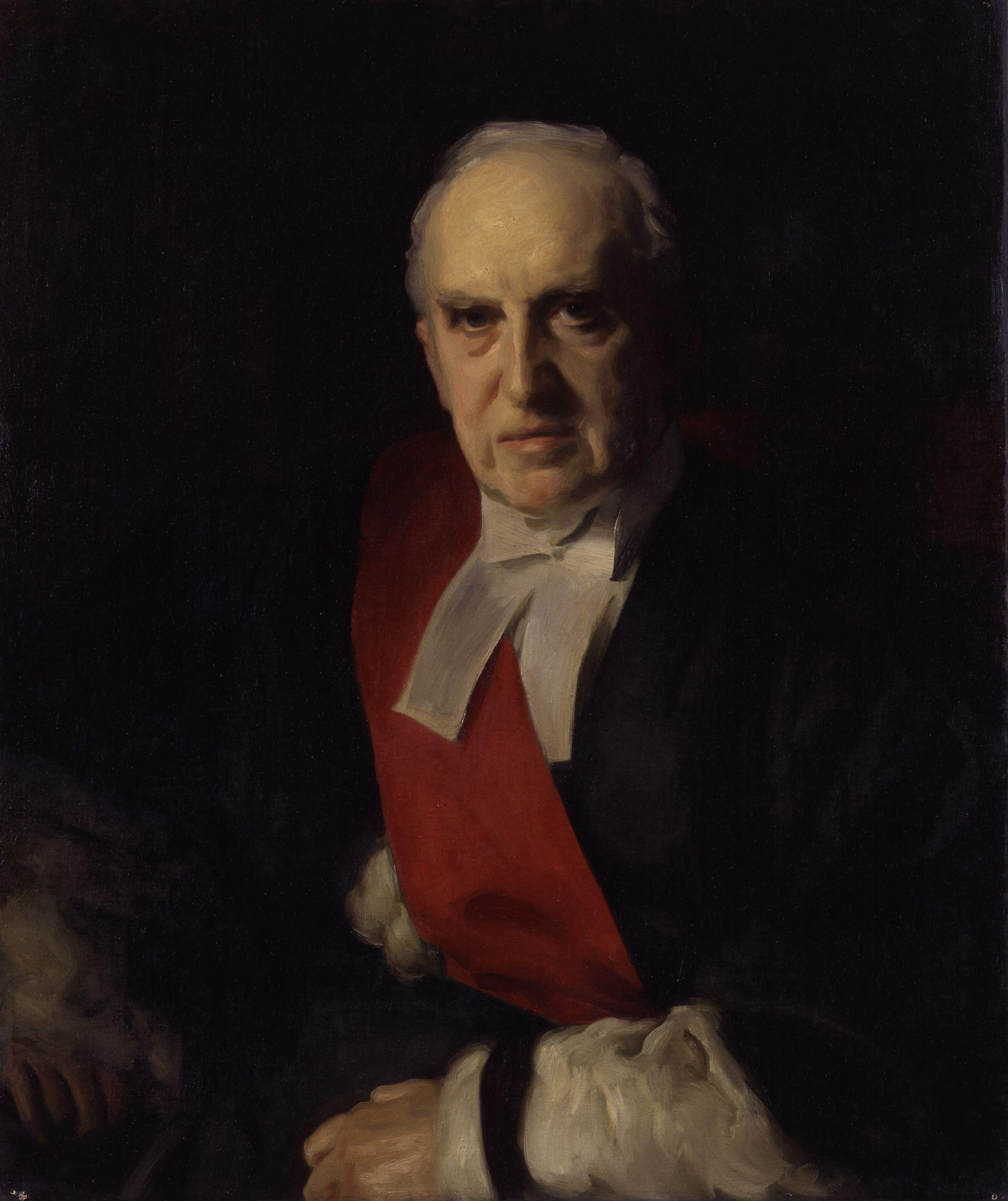
- Portrait by John Singer Sargent, 1900

Lord Chief Justice of England
- In office 11 July 1894 – 10 August 1900
- Monarch: Queen Victoria
- Preceded by: The Lord Coleridge
- Succeeded by: The Viscount Alverstone

Lord of Appeal in Ordinary
- In office 1894–1894

Attorney-General for England
- In office 20 August 1892 – 3 May 1894
- Monarch: Queen Victoria
- Prime Minister: William Ewart Gladstone; The Earl of Rosebury
- Preceded by: Sir Richard Webster
- Succeeded by: Sir John Rigby
- In office 9 February 1886 – 20 July 1886
- Monarch: Queen Victoria
- Prime Minister: William Ewart Gladstone
- Preceded by: Sir Richard Webster
- Succeeded by: Sir Richard Webster

Member of Parliament for Dundalk
- In office 2 April 1880 – 1885
- Preceded by: Philip Callan
- Succeeded by: constituency abolished

Member of Parliament for Hackney South
- In office 1885 – 10 July 1894
- Preceded by: new constituency
- Succeeded by: John Fletcher Moulton

Personal details
- Born: Charles Arthur Russell; 10 November 1832 Newry, County Down; Ireland
- Died: 10 August 1900 (aged 67) Westminster, London; England
- Party: Liberal
- Spouse: Ellen Mulholland (1858–1900)
- Relations: Rosa & Clara Mulholland (sisters-in-law)
- Children: 9, including Frank Russell
- Education: St. Malachy's College Castleknock College
- Occupation: Solicitor, Barrister, Judge
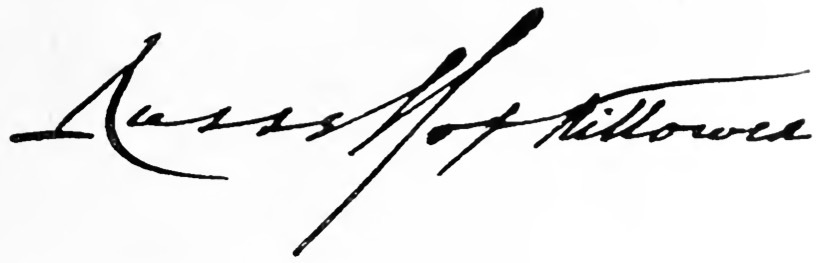
- Signature

Charles Arthur Russell, Baron Russell of Killowen, GCMG, PC (10 November 1832 – 10 August 1900) was an Irish statesman of the 19th century, and Lord Chief Justice of England. He was the first Roman Catholic to serve as Lord Chief Justice since the Reformation.

== Early life ==
Russell was born at 50 Queen Street (now Dominic Street) in Newry, County Down, the elder son of Arthur Russell (d.1845) of Killowen, County Down, a brewer, of Newry and Seafield House, Killowen, County Down, by his wife Margaret Mullin of Belfast. The family was in moderate circumstances. Charles was one of five children: his three sisters all became nuns and his brother Matthew Russell was ordained as a Jesuit priest.

Although Russell believed himself to be of Irish origin, he was later granted for his coat of arms a differenced version of the arms of the Russell Dukes of Bedford, which family originated in Dorset, England, in the 16th century. No relationship between the two families is apparent. Arthur Russell having died in 1845, the care of his large family devolved upon their talented mother and their paternal uncle, Charles William Russell.

He studied at the diocesan seminary, St Malachy's College, Belfast, at a private school in Newry, and Castleknock College, in Castleknock, Dublin. He then entered the law offices of Messrs Denvir, Newry, in 1849, and of O'Rourke, McDonald & Tweed, Belfast, in 1852. Admitted a solicitor in 1854, he practised in the county courts of Down and Antrim, and became at once the champion of the Catholics who had resisted organised attempts at proselytising by Protestants in these counties. He matriculated at Trinity College, Dublin in 1856, but never graduated.

== Lawyer ==
Friends urged Russell to become a barrister in London, and in 1856 he entered Lincoln's Inn. After study under Maine, Broom, and Birkbeck, he was called to the Bar in 1859. His success on the northern circuit soon recalled him to London, where he took silk in 1872, and divided the mercantile business of the circuit with Lord Herschell. His fees averaged £3,000 a year from 1862 to 1872, £10,000 in the next decade, £16,000 in the third, and in 1893–1894, his last year of practice (while attorney-general), reached £32,826. He was regarded as the leading advocate of his time. He was a strong supporter of Florence Maybrick, whom he believed to have been wrongly convicted.

== Home Rule advocate ==
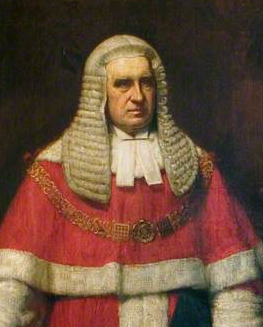
Lord Russell, Lord Chief Justice

In his first years in London he had been weekly correspondent of the Dublin paper "The Nation", an advanced Nationalist organ, and entered Parliament as a Liberal being elected, after two defeats, member for Dundalk in 1880. He generally acted with the Nationalists on Irish, and always on Catholic, questions, and, when he visited the United States of America in 1883, bore a flattering introduction from Charles Stewart Parnell. Elected member of parliament for Hackney South (1885–1894), he was knighted and appointed Attorney General by Prime Minister William Ewart Gladstone in 1886, and again became Attorney General in 1892 on the return of the Liberals to power. He was a strenuous advocate of Irish Home Rule in Parliament and on public platforms, and was leading advocate for Parnell at the Parnell Commission hearings in 1888–89. His cross-examination of the witnesses of the "Times", and especially his exposure of Richard Pigott, the author of the forgeries, made a favourable verdict inevitable. His famous eight-day speech for the defence was his greatest forensic effort.

== International arbitrations ==
In 1893 he represented Britain in the Bering Sea Arbitration, his speech against the United States' contentions lasting eleven days, and was appointed to the Order of St Michael and St George as a Knight Grand Cross (GCMG) "in recognition of services rendered in connection with the recent Behring Sea Arbitration" that year.

== Judicial career ==
Having been sworn of the Privy Council in April 1894, he was made a Lord of Appeal in Ordinary in May and was raised to the peerage for life as Baron Russell of Killowen, of Killowen in the County of Down, from his native village of Killowen. In July that year, he was appointed to be the Lord Chief Justice of England, the first Catholic to attain that office for centuries. He won speedily the public confidence and is ranked with the most illustrious of his predecessors. Lord Russell of Killowen revisited the United States in 1896 as the guest of the American Bar Association and delivered a notable address on arbitration. In 1899 he represented Britain during the Venezuelan boundary dispute arbitration hearings which followed from the Venezuela Crisis of 1895, and displayed all his old power of separating vital points from obscuring details. The following year he was attacked while on circuit by an internal malady, and, after a few weeks' illness, died in London, after receiving the sacraments of the Catholic Church, of which he had been always a faithful and devoted member. His place of burial is a small enclosed family cemetery within Epsom Cemetery.

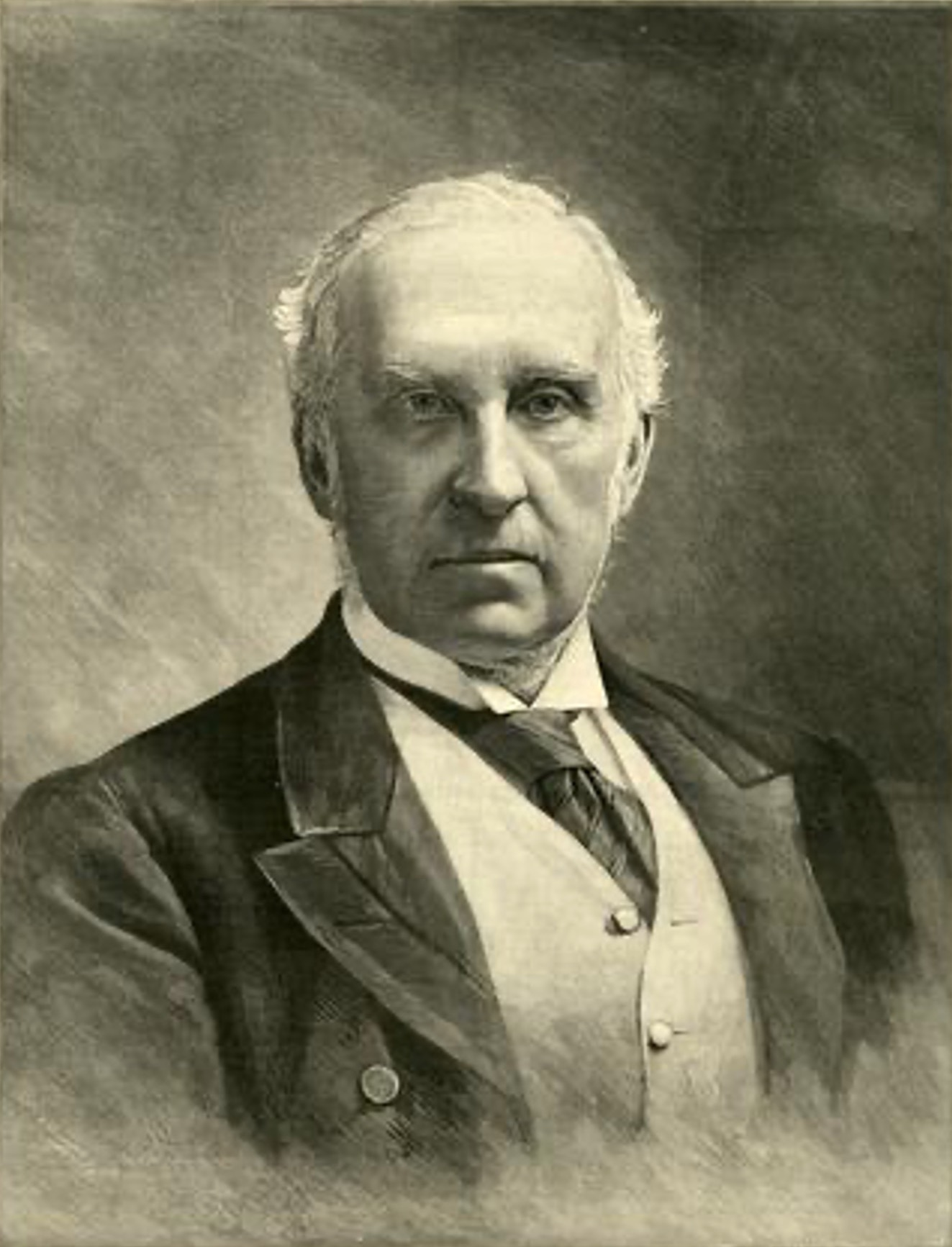
Portrait of Lord Russell, 1894.

== Family ==
He was married in 1858 to Ellen Mulholland, daughter of Dr. Mulholland, of Belfast, who succeeded him. They had five sons and four daughters, including:

- Arthur Joseph Russell (1862-1907), married his cousin Mary Florence Cumming, without issue.
- Sir Charles Russell, 1st Baronet, KCVO (1863–1928) (created a Baronet in 1916)
- Eileen Mary Russell (b.1865), married Douglas Lyon Holms
- Cyril Russell (b.1866), whose son Alec Charles Russell (1894–1938) inherited his uncle's baronetcy, by special remainder.
- Francis Xavier Joseph Russell (1867–1946), who would in 1929 be created Baron Russell of Killowen
- Mary Gertrude Russell (b. 1874), a nun
- Lieutenant-Colonel Bertrand Joseph Russell (b. 1876), Royal Horse Artillery
- Lilian Russell (b. 1878), married Henry Olpherts Drummond
- Margaret Russell (b. 1879)

His third son Francis Xavier Joseph "Frank" Russell and Frank's son Charles Ritchie Russell, were also prominent jurists ultimately appointed Lords of Appeal in Ordinary (in 1929 and 1975, respectively). Both took the title "Baron Russell of Killowen" on appointment, the same title as Charles Russell.

== Recognition ==
The unanimous tribute paid him by the English and American Bar and by the people and journals of the most diverse political and religious views attested that, despite his masterful character as lawyer, judge, and parliamentarian, and his stalwart loyalty to his faith and country, he had attained a rare and widespread popularity. In him were blended many qualities not usually found together. With a keen and orderly mind, a resolute will, great capacity for work, and severe official dignity, he combined sensibility of temperament, a spirit of helpfulness and comradeship, and a dreamer's devotion to ideals. He was always ready to write and speak for educational, religious, and benevolent purposes, though such action was not calculated to forward his political ambitions. Devoted to his family, he crossed the continent on his first American trip to visit Mother Mary Baptist Russell of San Francisco (who, with two others of his sisters, had entered the Order of Mercy), and found time to write for his children and send them day by day an admirable account of his experiences. In 1907 Bishop's Road in South Hackney was renamed Killowen Road in recognition of his work as the local M.P.

== Arms ==
Coat of arms of Charles Russell, Baron Russell of Killowen
Crest A Goat passant Argent armed Or charged on the body with three Trefoils slipped fesswise Vert Escutcheon Argent a Lion rampant Gules on a chief Sable three Escallops of the field the whole within a Bordure engrailed Vert Supporters Dexter: A Goat Or semée of Trefoils slipped Vert and gorged with a Collar Gemel Gules; Sinister: A Lion reguardant Or semée of Escallops Gules and gorged with a like collar Motto Che sera sera (What will be, will be)

== Publications ==
- "Diary of a Visit to the United States"; since edited by his brother Matthew Russell, and published (1910) by the U.S. Catholic Historical Society.
- "New Views of Ireland" (London, 1880);
- "The Christian Schools of England and Recent Legislation" (1883);
- Essay on Coleridge in the "North American Review" (1894),
- Essay on the legal profession in the "Strand Magazine" (1896);
- "Arbitration, its Origin, History, and Prospects" (London, 1896).

He was caricatured twice by "Spy".

== Notes ==
Parliament of the United Kingdom
Preceded by Philip Callan	Member of Parliament for Dundalk; 1880–1885	Constituency abolished
New constituency	Member of Parliament for Hackney South; 1885–1894	Succeeded by John Fletcher Moulton
Legal offices
Preceded by Sir Richard Webster	Attorney General; 1886	Succeeded by Sir Richard Webster
Preceded by Sir Richard Webster	Attorney General; 1892–1894	Succeeded by Sir John Rigby
Preceded by The Lord Coleridge	Lord Chief Justice of England and Wales; 1894–1900	Succeeded by The Lord Alverstone
