= Doris Ryer Nixon =

American civic leader (1893–1948)

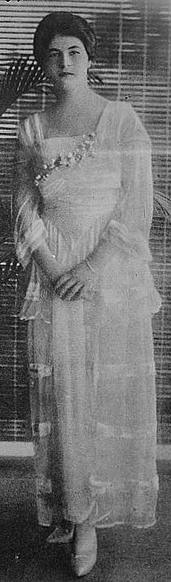
- Born: October 1, 1893; San Francisco, California, U.S.
- Died: June 24, 1948 (aged 54); San Francisco, California
- Occupation: Civic Leader
- Spouse: Stanhope Wood Nixon (m. 1917–1945) divorced
- Children: Lewis Nixon III and Blanche Nixon
- Parent(s): Fletcher and Blanche Ryer

Doris Ryer Nixon (October 1, 1893 – June 24, 1948) was an American civic leader, particularly on the home front during World War II. The granddaughter of one of California's first doctors, and daughter-in-law of a shipbuilder and industrialist, she became a national vice-president of the American Women's Voluntary Services (AWVS) during the war.

== Biography ==
=== Early life and education ===
Nixon was born in San Francisco, on October 1, 1893, to Fletcher and Blanche Ryer, who were wealthy agriculturalists. In 1906, she attended a school in Paris, France.

=== Debutante ===
Fletcher Ryer died in 1911, before reaching age 50. As Doris reached her early 20s, she and her mother became increasingly involved in the social scenes on the east coast, taking Benjamin Thaw's "cottage" in Newport, Rhode Island, for the summer of 1915. She was formally presented as a debutante in Newport that year. As the Oakland Tribune would write, "Mrs. Ryer has had her eye on several members of the British aristocracy for Doris, but this cruel war, of course, smashed all of her well-laid plans to smithereens." (Her mother would later marry Clifford Erskine-Bolst, a British Conservative Party politician (who was elected to the British House of Commons in 1923 and again in 1931.)

=== Marriage and family ===
She married Stanhope Wood Nixon January 23, 1917 in New York City. He was the son of Lewis Nixon I, a naval architect who briefly led Tammany Hall, and who was the namesake of Nixon Nitration Works and its home village of Nixon, New Jersey. Stanhope had become a subject of controversy several years before their marriage, after he was arrested for assaulting and seriously injuring a phone company engineer in New Haven following a wine party (an offense for which he was fined but not jailed). Doris and Stanhope were joined the following year by a son, Lewis Nixon III, and in 1923 by a daughter, Blanche Nixon. A second son was born in March 1922 but died two months later.

Doris and Stanhope were often apart, with Stanhope tending to the family business in New Jersey and Doris deeply involved in community activities in California. They were divorced in 1945.

=== Civic leadership ===
Nixon was the founder and president of Guide Dogs for the Blind, Inc., state commander of the California Cancer Society, and national vice-president of the American Women's Voluntary Services during World War II. The AWVS was a key organization for coordinating volunteer activities in support of the war effort. She had founded the California chapter, and had served as its first president. She also served as a member of the World Affairs Council and numerous organizations devoted to peace.

In June 1947 she and 119 other civic leaders signed a letter urging Congress to immediately adopt legislation providing for universal military training.

=== Death ===
Nixon died in her home in San Francisco on June 24, 1948, at age 54. She left an estate valued at approximately $750,000, which included a half interest in a 6,600-acre (27 km^{2}) ranch on Ryer Island.

== Legacy ==
Her son, Lewis Nixon III, served as an officer in the 506th Parachute Infantry Regiment, part of it with E Company. His association with E Company would bring him fame after his 1995 death, when the company became the subject of the 2001 television mini-series Band of Brothers based on the Stephen Ambrose book.
