= Howard Cox =

British academic and professor

Howard Cox is a British academic and Professor of International Business History at the University of Worcester. His research covers international business, industrial and corporate change, and the business history of various industries, including publishing, tobacco, alcoholic beverages, and food retailing. He is a contributor to the History of Oxford University Press which will be published in 2016, and is an associate member of the Centre for Printing History and Culture (CPHC). His keynote lecture to the 2016 symposium of the CHPC was about the founder of John Bull, Horatio Bottomley and entitled "Horatio Bottomley and the Making of John Bull Magazine."

== Publications ==
As collaborator:

- Cox, H. and Mowatt, S (2014) Revolutions from Grub Street: A History of Magazine Publishing in Britain. Oxford University Press.
- John, R., Cox, H., Grimwade, N. and Ietto-Gillies, G. (1997) Global Business Strategy, London: International Thomson Press.

As author:

- Cox, H. (2000) The Global Cigarette: Origins and Evolution of British American Tobacco, 1880-1945, Oxford: Oxford University Press.

As editor:

- Cox, H., Clegg, J. and Ietto-Gillies, G. (1993) The Growth of Global Business, London: Routledge. Reprinted 2012.
