= Lewis Nixon III =

United States Army officer (1918–1995)

Lewis Nixon
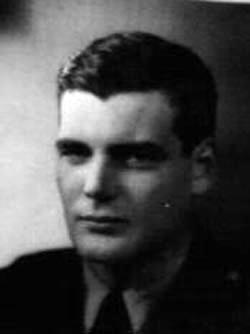
- Born: September 30, 1918; New York City, U.S.
- Died: January 11, 1995 (aged 76); Los Angeles, California, U.S.
- Burial place: Forest Lawn Memorial Park
- Relatives: Lewis Nixon (grandfather); Stanhope Wood Nixon (father); Doris Ryer Nixon (mother)
- Military career
- Allegiance: United States of America
- Branch: United States Army
- Service years: 1941–1945
- Rank: Captain
- Unit: E Company, 2nd Battalion, 506th PIR, 101st Airborne Division
- Conflicts: World War II; Battle of Normandy; Operation Market Garden; Battle of the Bulge; Western Allied invasion of Germany; Operation Varsity

Lewis Nixon III (September 30, 1918 – January 11, 1995) was a United States Army officer who, during World War II, served at the company, battalion, and regimental level with the 506th Parachute Infantry Regiment, 101st Airborne Division. Nixon was portrayed in the HBO miniseries Band of Brothers by Ron Livingston.

== Early life ==
Lewis Nixon was born to Stanhope Wood Nixon and Doris Ryer Nixon on September 30, 1918, in New York City. He was the grandson of shipbuilder Lewis Nixon and Sally Wood Nixon. At age seven, Lewis took third place in the model yacht regatta at Conservatory Lake in Central Park on May 22, 1926, earning a gold and bronze medal in the 35-inch (890 mm) boat class. As a youth, Nixon lived in New York City and Montecito, California; he traveled the world extensively, visiting Germany, France, and England. Nixon graduated from Cate School in Carpinteria, then attended Yale University for two years.

== Military service ==
Nixon volunteered to be drafted into the United States Army and entered service on January 14, 1941, at Trenton, New Jersey. After graduating from Army Officer Candidate School in 1941 as an infantry second lieutenant, he volunteered for the parachute infantry, part of the U.S. Army's fledgling airborne forces. He was assigned to E Company, 2nd Battalion, 506th Parachute Infantry Regiment (506th PIR). The regiment was commanded by Colonel Robert Sink. The 506th was an independent regiment until June 1943, when it became part of the 101st Airborne Division. Nixon went through the regimental unit training and pre-airborne training at Camp Toccoa, Georgia, and Airborne School at Fort Benning, eventually training at many locations throughout the United States. In September 1943, he was sent with the 506th to Aldbourne, Wiltshire, England, in preparation for the Allied invasion of Normandy.

Nixon was appointed as the 2nd Battalion intelligence officer (S2). He and the 506th parachuted into Normandy on June 6, 1944. Shortly after Easy Company fought in the Battle of Carentan on June 12, 1944, he was moved up to the regimental level as the 506th S2. He served in the Netherlands, Belgium, and Germany. In the Netherlands, he was hit by a bullet from a German MG 42 machine gun. The bullet went through his helmet, grazed his forehead, and left a small burn mark. He developed a drinking problem, and was eventually removed and assigned back down to the 2nd Battalion as the operations officer (S3), where he continued to display his skill at planning and operations, but did not have to deal with the politics and high visibility at the regimental level.

Nixon was one of the few men of the 101st Airborne to jump with another division or regiment. On March 24, 1945, Nixon was assigned by Major General Maxwell Taylor, the commanding general of the 101st, to be an observer with Major General William Miley's 17th Airborne Division during Operation Varsity, the airborne crossing of the river Rhine. Nixon's plane took a direct hit and only he and three others got out. He is also one of very few men in the 101st to earn three Combat Jump Stars on his Jump Wings.

In Berchtesgaden, he had first choice of an extensive captured wine collection originally assembled at Hermann Göring's orders, comprising bottles stolen from wineries across France and other European occupied territories. Nixon saw the defeat of Germany and ended World War II with the rank of captain. He never fired a shot in combat, though he spent much time on the front lines during intense close fighting. He returned home in September 1945.

Nixon was remembered as always having a source of whisky no matter where the company was, and in particular for his love of the blended whisky Vat 69, as noted in the book Band of Brothers by Stephen E. Ambrose and the miniseries made from it.

== Family ==
On 20 December 1941, Nixon married Katharine Page of Phoenix, Arizona. That marriage failed, as did the next.

In 1956, Nixon married his third wife, Grace Umezawa. She had been a student in California in the spring of 1942 when President Franklin Roosevelt ordered the incarceration of Japanese Americans. Richard Winters served as the best man at the wedding. Nixon got his life back together and overcame his alcoholism during their marriage. They had no children.

== Later years ==
After the war, Nixon worked at his family's Nixon Nitration Works in Edison (then Raritan Township), New Jersey, alongside his father, Stanhope, and longtime friend, Dick Winters.

Lewis Nixon died of complications from diabetes in Los Angeles, California, on January 11, 1995. Winters gave the eulogy at Grace's request. Clarence Hester and Bob Brewer of Easy Company also attended the funeral.

Nixon's widow Grace was a guest at a farewell party for Ron Livingston before he left for England for an actor boot camp ahead of filming the Band of Brothers miniseries, where he plays Nixon. Livingston recorded their meeting in an official HBO video diary.

== Bibliography ==
- Ambrose, Stephen E. (1992). Band of Brothers: Easy Company, 506th Regiment, 101st Airborne from Normandy to Hitler's Eagle's Nest. Simon & Schuster. ISBN 978-0-7434-6411-6.
- Winters, Major Dick; Kingseed, Cole C. (2006). Beyond Band of Brothers: The War Memoirs of Major Dick Winters. Berkley Hardcover. ISBN 978-0-425-20813-7.
