= John Bull (magazine) =

Various British periodicals, 1820 to 1964

John Bull is the name of a succession of different periodicals published in the United Kingdom during the period 1820–1964. In its original form, a Sunday newspaper published from 1820 to 1892, John Bull was a champion of traditionalist conservatism. From 1906 to 1920, under Member of Parliament Horatio Bottomley, John Bull became a platform for his trenchant populist views. A 1946 relaunch by Odhams Press transformed John Bull magazine into something similar in style to the American magazine The Saturday Evening Post.

All versions of the publication intended to cash in on John Bull, the national personification of the United Kingdom in general and England in particular. (In political cartoons and similar graphic works, John Bull is usually depicted as a stout, middle-aged, country-dwelling, jolly and matter-of-fact man.)

== Sunday newspaper ==
John Bull
- Format: Weekly newspaper
- Founder: Theodore Hook
- Publisher: Theodore Hook
- Editor: Theodore Hook
- Launched: 1820; 206 years ago
- Ceased publication: 1892; 134 years ago
- Political alignment: Traditionalist conservatism
- Language: English
- City: London
- Country: United Kingdom

The original John Bull was a Sunday newspaper established in the City, London EC4, by Theodore Hook in 1820. Under Hook, John Bull was a champion of high Toryism and the virulent detractor of Queen Caroline. Witty criticism and pitiless invective secured it a large circulation, and Hook derived, for the first year at least, an income of £2,000. Hook was arrested, however, on account of his debt to the state, and was confined to a sponging-house from 1823 to 1825.

This iteration of John Bull lasted until July 1892, although subsequent identically named publications were cited in 1899 and 1903.

== Magazine ==
=== Bottomley period ===
John Bull
- John Bull cover, January 1957
- Former editors: Horatio Bottomley (1906–1920); Geoffrey Williamson (c. 1923); Tom Darlow (at least 1936–1938)
- Categories: Culture, Fiction, Nonfiction, Cartoons
- Circulation: 750,000 (1914)
- Publisher: Horatio Bottomley (1906–1920); Odhams Press (1920–1964)
- Founder: Horatio Bottomley
- First issue: 1906; 120 years ago
- Final issue: 1964; 62 years ago
- Country: United Kingdom
- Based in: London
- Language: English

Horatio Bottomley, an MP for the Liberal Party, relaunched the magazine on 12 May 1906. From its first issue John Bull adopted a tabloid style that, despite occasional lapses in taste, proved immensely popular. Among its regular features, Bottomley revived his "The World, the Flesh and the Devil" column from The Sun, and also adapted that paper's slogan: "If you read it in John Bull, it is so". Bottomley persuaded Julius Elias, managing director of Odhams Limited, to handle the printing, but chaotic financial management meant that Odhams were rarely paid. This situation was resolved when the entire management of the magazine, including the handling of all receipts and payments, was transferred to Elias, leaving Bottomley free to concentrate on editing and journalism. Circulation rose rapidly, and by 1910 had reached half a million copies.

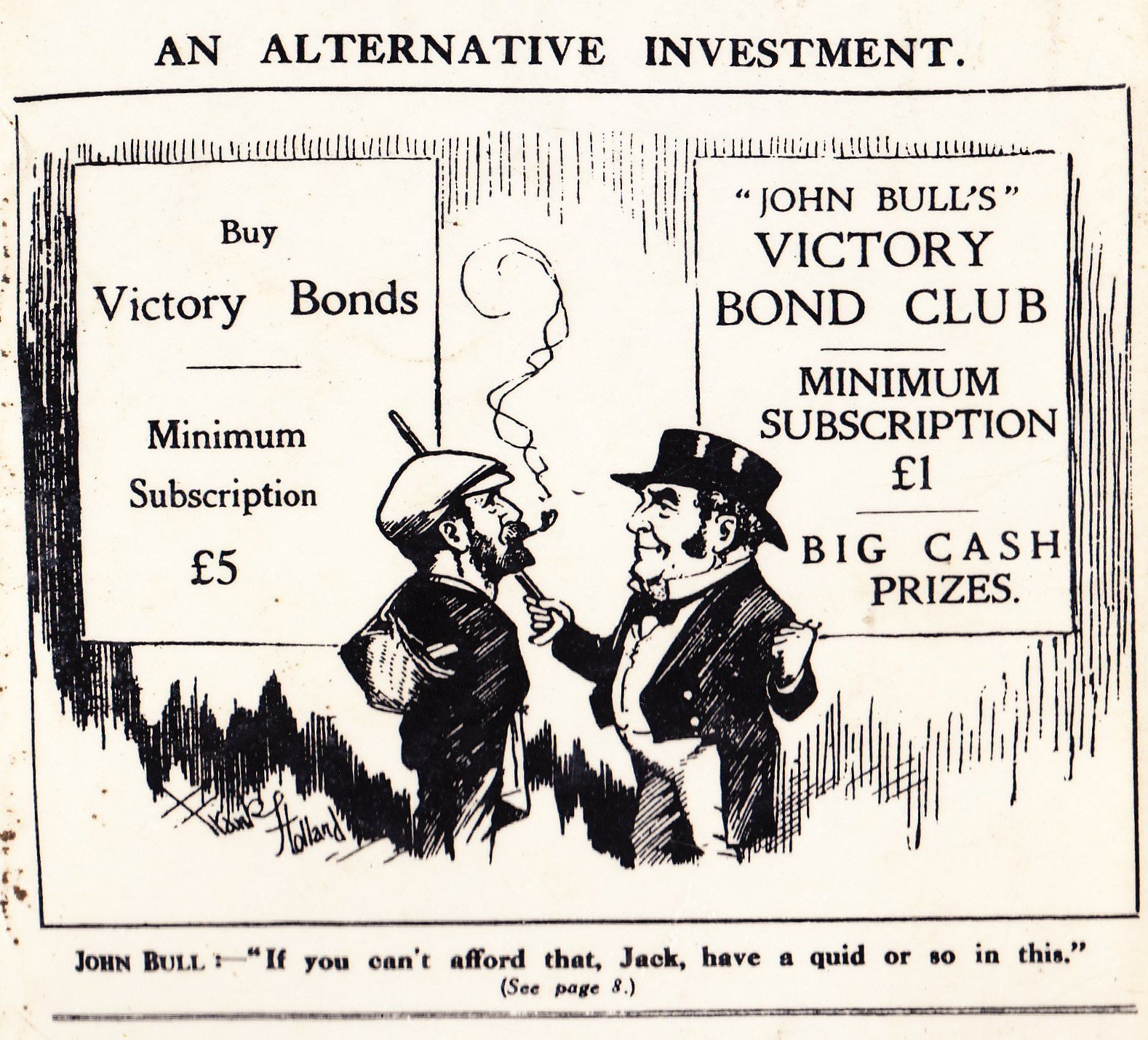
John Bull advertises Bottomley's "Victory Bonds" scheme, 12 July 1919

After the murder of the Austrian Archduke Franz Ferdinand on 28 June 1914 in Sarajevo, allegedly with Serbian complicity, John Bull described Serbia as "a hotbed of cold-blooded conspiracy and subterfuge", and called for it to be wiped from the map of Europe. When Britain declared war on the Central Powers on 4 August, Bottomley quickly reversed his position, and within a fortnight was demanding the elimination of Germany. John Bull campaigned relentlessly against the "Germhuns", and against British citizens carrying German-sounding surnames—the danger of "the enemy within" was a persistent Bottomley theme.

The periodical continued production during the First World War; Howard Cox estimates its sales by August 1914 at in excess of three quarters of a million copies a week. By the end of October 1914 the cover of John Bull was '"boasting that the magazine’s circulation was the largest of any weekly journal in the world".

Charles Frederick Palmer served as John Bull's deputy editor from at least 1918 until his premature death in October 1920.

Following the October Revolution in Russia, John Bull adopted a strong anti-communist tone in its articles.

John Bull was the subject of a libel case in 1919 concerning a biographical film about David Lloyd George. Partly as a result, in 1920 Odhams Press revoked the pre-war partnership agreement and took full control of John Bull. Bottomley was made editor for life, but a year later Odhams terminated this arrangement with a final pay-off of £25,000, which ended Bottomley's connection with the paper. (In 1927, Bottomley tried to resurrect his business career by starting a new magazine, John Blunt, as a rival to John Bull, but the new venture lasted little more than a year before closing, having lost money from the start.)

=== Odhams period ===
In 1923, the magazine was said to be "ultra-patriotic." Geoffrey Williamson was editor around this time. Evidence of the magazine being in print are cited in 1931, 1939, and 1944. The "popular" Tom Darlow was editor during the period 1936–1938.

Elkan Allan, later to become a television producer, worked as the magazine's picture editor in the 1940s.

The 1946 relaunch featured covers that encapsulated post-war Britain and employed some of Britain's finest illustrators. During this period, the magazine also included short stories by major British authors such as H. E. Bates, Agatha Christie, Nicholas Monsarrat, N. J. Crisp, Gerald Kersh, J. B. Priestley and C. S. Forester.

During John Bull's run it incorporated other magazines, such as Illustrated (1958), Passing Show, and Everybody's Weekly (1959).

=== End of publication ===
Following a sharp drop in circulation, the magazine was renamed Today, The New John Bull in 1960. It attempted to appeal to a younger readership with features on aspects of youth culture, such as rock and roll. In 1964, its circulation was just over 700,000, but advertising revenue did not meet its costs, and it was closed. Officially, it was merged with Weekend magazine.
