= 1912 Hackney South by-election =

UK parliamentary by-election

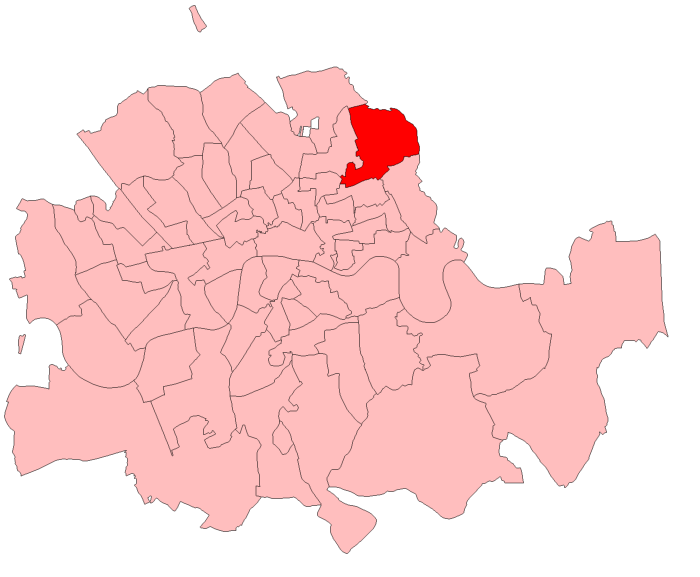
Hackney South in London, 1912

The 1912 Hackney South by-election was a Parliamentary by-election held on 24 May 1912. The constituency returned one Member of Parliament (MP) to the House of Commons of the United Kingdom, elected by the first past the post voting system.

== Vacancy ==
In May 1912, Horatio Bottomley, the controversial Liberal MP for Hackney South, was forced to resign his seat when he was declared bankrupt. Bottomley had been unpopular with a large portion of the party's activists in Hackney, who had run their own candidate against him in December 1910.

== Electoral history ==
General election December 1910: Hackney South
Party	Candidate	Votes	%	±%
Liberal	Horatio Bottomley	5,068	49.4	−13.5
Conservative	Sydney Charles Nettleton King-Farlow	3,243	31.6	−5.5
Independent Liberal	Richard Roberts	1,946	19.0	New
Majority		1,825	17.8	−8.0
Turnout		10,257	72.6	−9.6
Independent hold		Swing	-4.0	

== Candidates ==
The two Liberal factions came together to nominate Hector Morison for the vacancy. Morison was a 62-year-old Scottish member of the London Stock Exchange. He was also a former Member of Parliament, he had sat for Eastbourne from January to December 1910, when he was defeated.

The Unionists selected John Constant Gibson, a 51-year-old Scottish businessman.

== Result ==
The Liberal Party held the seat.

Morison

Hackney South by-election, 1912
Party	Candidate	Votes	%	±%
Liberal	Hector Morison	5,339	52.5	+33.5
Conservative	John Constant Gibson	4,836	47.5	+15.9
Majority		503	5.0	−12.8
Turnout		10,175	70.1	−2.5
Liberal hold		Swing	-6.4	

== Following election ==
General election 14 December 1918: Hackney South
Party	Candidate	Votes	%	±%
Independent	Horatio Bottomley	11,145	79.7	N/A
Liberal	Arthur Henri	2,830	20.3	−32.2
Majority		8,315	59.4	N/A
Turnout		13,975	55.4	−17.2
Independent gain from Liberal		Swing		

- Henri was the endorsed candidate of the Coalition Government.

== Aftermath ==
Morison served only one term as a member of the Commons. He chose to retire at the next general election in 1918. Horatio Bottomley, whose bankruptcy had been annulled, regained the Hackney South seat as an independent though he would later be expelled again, leading to the 1922 Hackney South by-election.
