= Hector Morison =

Hector Morison

Hector Morison (1850 – 4 June 1939) was a British stockbroker and Liberal Party politician.

He was the son of John Morison of Glasgow, and was educated at the city's academy and university. He joined a Glasgow firm of chartered accountants and stockbrokers, but found his opportunities too limited. Accordingly, in 1879 he moved to London, and in 1886 became a member of the London Stock Exchange.

In 1876 Morison had married Josephine Ashton, member of a Manchester family of textile industrialists. He built up an expertise in the textile industry, and was a principal trader in the shares of J & P Coats, the Bradford Dyers Association and the English Sewing Cotton Company.

Morison was politically a man of strong Liberal views. He was elected to the Croydon School Board, and was the party's parliamentary candidate at Lewes in 1906 and at Eastbourne in January and December 1910.

In May 1912, Horatio Bottomley, the controversial Liberal MP for Hackney South, was forced to his resign his seat when he was declared bankrupt. Bottomley had been unpopular with a large portion of the party's activists in Hackney, who had run their own candidate against him in December 1910. The two Liberal factions came together to nominate Morison for the vacancy. He was comfortably elected at the by-election held on 24 May.

Morison served only one term as a member of the Commons. He chose to retire at the next general election in 1918. Horatio Bottomley, whose bankruptcy had been annulled, regained the Hackney South seat as an independent.

Hector Morison played no further part in public life, living in quiet retirement. He died, aged 89, at his home "Beechcroft", Kenley, near Croydon, in June 1939.

Parliament of the United Kingdom
Preceded by Horatio Bottomley	Member of Parliament for Hackney South; 1912 – 1918	Succeeded by Horatio Bottomley
