= 1922 Hackney South by-election =

UK Parliamentary by-election

The 1922 Hackney South by-election was held on 18 August 1922, after the expulsion from the UK House of Commons of the incumbent MP, Horatio Bottomley, who was leader of the Independent Parliamentary Group which attacked the Lloyd George coalition from the right. Bottomley had a colourful career and had been forced to resign from the Commons before for bankruptcy, which had led to the 1912 Hackney South by-election. Originally elected to Hackney South as a Liberal, he remained popular and had come back in 1918 as an Independent MP. He was expelled in 1922 due to the collapse of another of his financial schemes and his subsequent fraud conviction.

The by-election was won by the Coalition Unionist candidate Clifford Erskine-Bolst.

Hackney South by-election, 18 August 1922
Party		Candidate	Votes	%	±%
C	Unionist	Clifford Erskine-Bolst	9,118	50.2	N/A
	Labour	Holford Knight	9,046	49.8	New
Majority			72	0.4	N/A
Turnout			18,164	56.3	+0.9
	Unionist gain from Independent				
C indicates candidate endorsed by the coalition government.

Although elected a member of the 31st parliament, Erskine-Bolst was unable to take his seat as the House had adjourned, and did not meet again prior to dissolution. Erskine-Bolst then held the seat in the 1922 general election with a substantially larger majority but came third in the 1923 general election.
