= Stanhope Wood Nixon =

American businessman

- Born: April 1, 1894; Philadelphia, Pennsylvania
- Died: January 12, 1958 (aged 63); East Brunswick Township, New Jersey
- Education: Yale University
- Spouse: Doris Ryer (m. 1917; div. 1945)
- Children: Lewis Nixon III; Blanche Nixon
- Parent(s): Lewis Nixon I Sally Lewis Wood

Stanhope Wood Nixon (April 1, 1894 – January 12, 1958) was a vice president of the Nixon Nitration Works during the 1924 Nixon Nitration Works disaster. He later became chairman of the board.

He was born on April 1, 1894, in Philadelphia, Pennsylvania, a son of Lewis Nixon I. In 1902 or 1903, he was painted as a boy by the Swiss-born American artist Adolfo Müller-Ury (1862–1947) full-length dressed in Scottish costume (Private Collection, New Jersey).

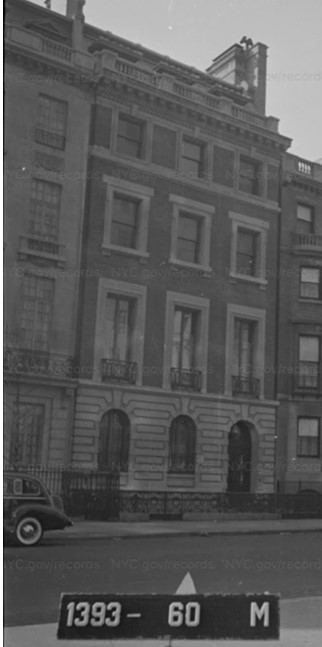
Ripley House at 16 East 79th Street in 1940s

He attended Yale University at the Sheffield Scientific School, where he was arrested for assault in 1914 after he almost killed Edward H. Evrit with a large metal bolt. He withdrew from Yale and never graduated. He married Doris Ryer in 1917; the couple had two children who survived to adulthood: Lewis Nixon III and Blanche Nixon. A third child, Fletcher Ryan, died as an infant on May 21, 1922.

He was a vice president of the Nixon Nitration Works during the 1924 Nixon Nitration Works disaster, and his father was the president. Neither of them were present on the day of the explosion.

He and his wife divorced in Palm Beach, Florida, in 1945. He later married Elizabeth Mulcahy. He died on January 12, 1958, at his home in East Brunswick Township, New Jersey.

== Legacy ==
Stanhope's son, Lewis Nixon III (1918-1995, Captain, Ret.), was a US Army officer in "Easy" Company of the 506th Parachute Infantry Regiment of the 101st Airborne Division during World War II. Nixon III parachuted into combat on D-Day, participated in Operation Market Garden, and fought in the Battle of the Bulge.

Lewis III and his best friend Richard Winters (1918–2011) worked for Nixon Nitrate after World War II.

Lewis III and Winters were made famous by the miniseries Band of Brothers after Stephen E. Ambrose's 1992 book of the same name.
