= Clifford Erskine-Bolst =

British politician (1878–1946)

Member of Parliament
- In office 27 October 1931 – 25 October 1935
- Preceded by: Walter de Frece
- Succeeded by: Roland Robinson
- Constituency: Blackpool
- In office 18 August 1922 – 16 November 1923
- Preceded by: Horatio Bottomley
- Succeeded by: Herbert Morrison
- Constituency: Hackney South

Personal details
- Born: Clifford Charles Alan Lawrence Erskine-Bolst; 1878
- Died: 11 January 1946 (aged 67–68)
- Spouse: Blanche Ryer (div. 1933)
- Relatives: Doris Ryer Nixon (stepdaughter)

Captain Clifford Charles Alan Lawrence Erskine-Bolst (1878 – 11 January 1946) was a British Conservative Party politician.

During the First World War, he served as a lieutenant in the 1st Black Watch Regiment, and as a captain in the 3rd Royal Highlanders.

He was elected as Member of Parliament (MP) for Hackney South at a by-election in August 1922 following the expulsion of the independent MP Horatio Bottomley, who had been convicted of fraud. He held the seat at the November 1922 general election, but lost it the following year at the 1923 general election.

Erskine-Bolt returned to the House of Commons at the November 1931 general election, when he was elected in the Blackpool constituency, defeating the writer Edgar Wallace, who ran as an independent Liberal. He served only one term, stepping down at the 1935 general election.

He was married to California socialite Blanche Ryer from the early 1920s until their divorce in 1933. As a result of this marriage he became the stepfather of Doris Ryer Nixon.

His name appears in the San Francisco Social Register for 1927, and again in 1932 (where he and his wife are listed as residents of Èze, France).

== External lists ==
- Hansard 1803–2005: contributions in Parliament by Clifford Erskine-Bolst

Parliament of the United Kingdom
Preceded by Horatio Bottomley	Member of Parliament for Hackney South; 1922–1923	Succeeded by Herbert Morrison
Preceded by Sir Walter de Frece	Member of Parliament for Blackpool; 1931–1935	Succeeded by Roland Robinson
