= R. Norris Shreve =

American chemical engineer (1885–1975)

Randolph Norris Shreve (March 9, 1885 – February 17, 1975) was an American chemical engineer. After joining the Purdue University faculty in 1930, he helped to build the university's School of Chemical Engineering, the Purdue-Taiwan Engineering Project, and National Cheng Kung University in Taiwan. He and his wife Eleanor are the namesakes of the Shreve Professorship of Organic Technology and Shreve Residence Hall at Purdue, and Shreve Hall on the Cheng Kung University campus. He is the namesake of the Norris Shreve Award for Outstanding Teaching in Chemical Engineering.

== Early life ==
Shreve was born in St. Louis, Missouri on March 9, 1885. After graduating from Ferguson High School in Ferguson, Missouri, he was unable to afford college, and instead began work as a laboratory boy at the Mallinckrodt Chemical Works in St. Louis, where he learned chemistry from Charles Luedeking and William Lamar. Mallinckrodt loaned him enough money to allow him to attend Harvard University, where he graduated summa cum laude in 1907 after only three years of attendance (a record at Harvard that would remain for more than 40 years). After graduating, he returned to Mallinckrodt, where he became a chemist in the alkaloidal department. Lamar and Shreve left Mallinckrodt and St. Louis in 1911 for northern New Jersey, where Lamar founded Lamar Chemical Works, which Shreve soon took over. At age 29, he founded Shreve Chemical Company, before becoming a chemical engineering consultant in 1919.

== Career ==
In 1923 Shreve became the chief stockholder and president of Ammonite Company, which was then based at the Nixon Nitration Works in what is now Edison, New Jersey. On March 1, 1924, Ammonite, which was involved in extracting ammonium nitrate from shells from the Raritan Arsenal, triggered a massive explosion and resulting fire (known as the 1924 Nixon Nitration Works disaster) that destroyed the Nitration Works. This led to the dissolution of Ammonite in 1926.

Shreve joined the Purdue University College of Engineering faculty in 1930, becoming a full professor the next year. He defined his main research field as "organic chemical technology." Rising through the ranks, he chaired the School of Chemical Engineering from 1947 to 1951. He has been recognized as "the main proponent of teaching industrial chemistry in U.S. chemical engineering departments in the second quarter of the 20th century." In 1951 he became director of the Purdue-Taiwan Engineering Project, which was intended to improve engineering education in Taiwan, modernize its industries, and improve connections between its colleges of engineering and industries. This also played an important role in the modernization of Taiwan Provincial College of Engineering into Taiwan Provincial Cheng Kung University. From 1952 until 1961, he and his wife spent several months each year in Taiwan assisting the university's development. In 1961, he became a professor emeritus, and was awarded the honorary degree of Doctor of Engineering from Purdue.

Shreve was the holder or co-holder of five patents. He wrote several books, most notably Chemical Process Industries, a major text now in its fifth edition. In 2008 it was recognized by the American Institute of Chemical Engineers and its Centennial Celebration Committee, which included Shreve and Chemical Process Industries on its list of "30 Authors and their Groundbreaking Chemical Engineering Books."

Mr. and Mrs. Shreve also collected Asian jade and gems. He eventually donated their jade collection to the Indianapolis Museum of Art, where it is one of the museum's best-known collections. Their gem collection was donated to Purdue.

Shreve died on February 17, 1975, and was interred in Bellafontaine Cemetery, in St. Louis.

== Books and brochures ==
- Shreve, R. Norris; Wateson, Warren N.; and Willis, A.R. Dyes Classified By Intermediates. 1922.
- Shreve, R. Norris. Greensand Bibliography to 1930 (with a chapter on Zeolite Water Softeners). 1930.
- Shreve, R. Norris; Ullmann, Fritz; and Fotos, John Theodore. Intermediate Readings in Chemical and Technical German. New York: John Wiley & Sons, 1938.
- Shreve, R. Norris; and Fotos, John Theodore. Advanced Readings in Chemical and Technical German. New York: John Wiley & Sons, 1940.
- Shreve, R. Norris; and Olive, Theodore. Chemical Engineering Flow Sheets. 1944.
- Shreve, R. Norris. Chemical Process Industries. New York: McGraw-Hill, 1945.
- Shreve, R. Norris. Selected Process Industries. 1950.
- Shreve, R. Norris; Ewell, Raymond; and Alder, Thomas. Industrial Research and Development in the Philippines. 1956.
- Shreve, R. Norris. Shreve Collection of Gems and Gold (Brochure). The Lapidary Journal, Inc., San Diego, CA., 1971.
