= Lewis Nixon (naval architect) =

American naval architect and political activist

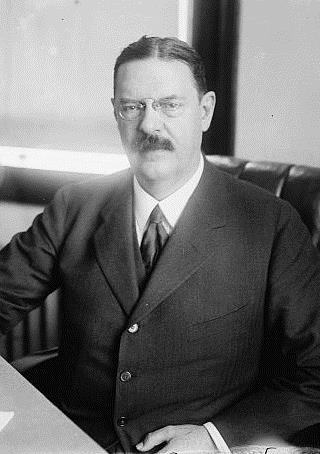
- Born: April 7, 1861; Leesburg, Virginia
- Died: September 23, 1940 (aged 79); Long Branch, New Jersey
- Occupations: Naval architect and political activist
- Spouses: Sally Lewis Wood (m. 1891; died 1937) Mary Doran (m. 1937)
- Children: Stanhope Wood Nixon, Joel Peter Nixon
- Relatives: Lewis Nixon III (grandson); Joel Peter Nixon Jr. (grandson); Kelly Christine Nixon (granddaughter)

Lewis Nixon (April 7, 1861 – September 23, 1940) was a naval architect, shipbuilding executive, public servant, and political activist. He designed the United States' first modern battleships, and supervised the construction of its first modern submarines, all before his 40th birthday. He was briefly the leader of Tammany Hall. He started an ill-fated effort to run seven major American shipyards under common ownership as the United States Shipbuilding Company, and he was the chair of the New York City commission that began construction of the Williamsburg Bridge.

== Birth and naval education ==
Nixon was born on the eve of the American Civil War, in Leesburg, Virginia, to Colonel Joel Lewis Nixon and Mary Jane Turner. Leesburg, only three miles into the Confederacy, changed hands several times over the course of the War. His brother George H. Nixon fought in the Virginia Cavalry as a member of "Mosby's Raiders."

Nixon graduated first in his class from the United States Naval Academy in 1882 and was sent to study naval architecture at the Royal Naval College, Greenwich, where, in 1885, he again graduated first in the class.

== Shipbuilding and other businesses ==
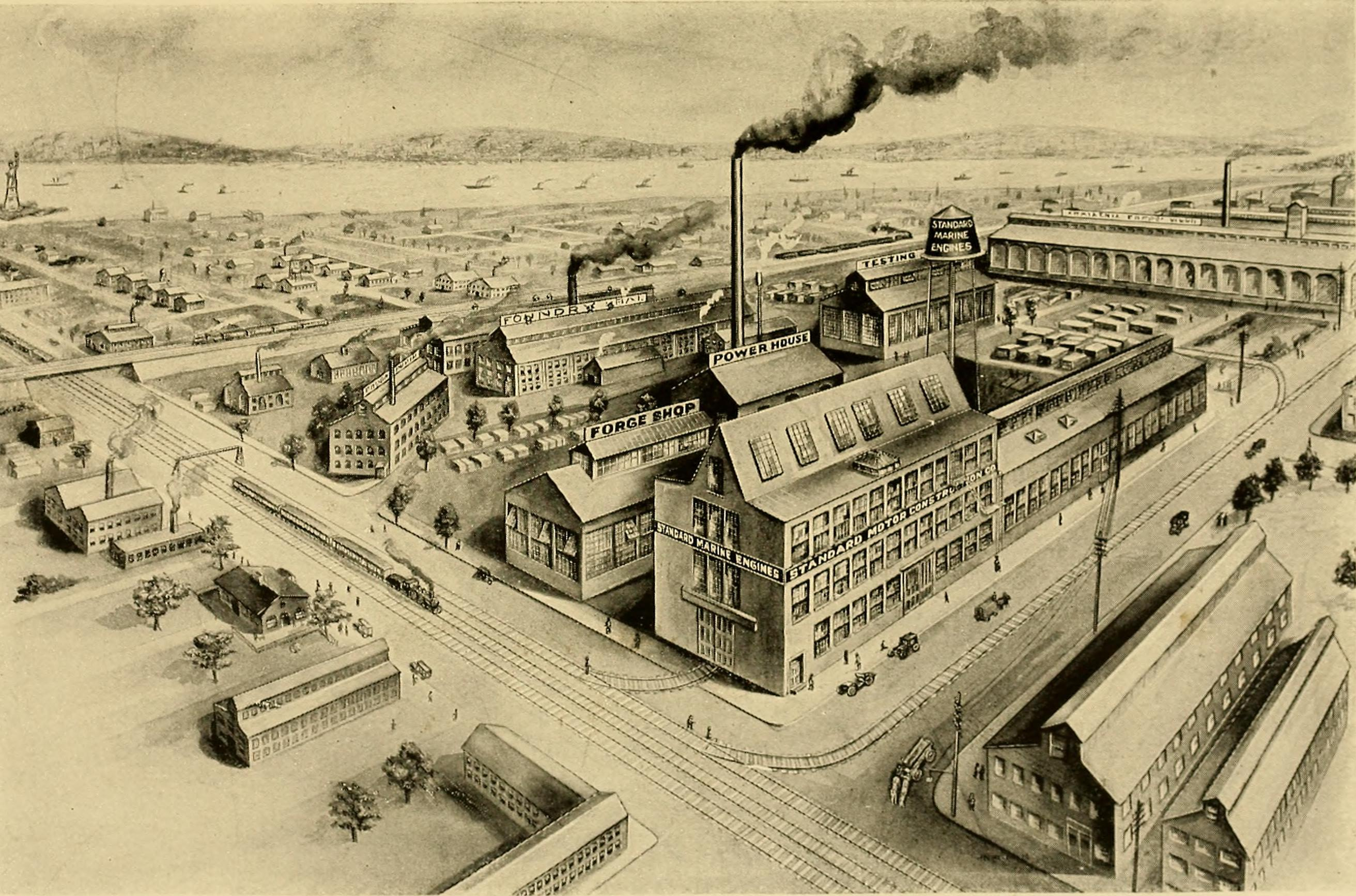
Standard Motor Construction Company, Jersey City, bef. 1920

On Nixon's return to the United States, he was assigned to the John Roach & Sons shipyard in Chester, Pennsylvania, which the United States Navy had commandeered in order to finish three protected cruisers of the new steel navy: USS Atlanta, USS Boston, and USS Chicago. In 1890, with help from assistant naval constructor David W. Taylor, he designed the three Indiana-class battleships: USS Indiana (BB-1), USS Massachusetts (BB-2) and USS Oregon (BB-3). While in Pennsylvania, he earned a Doctor of Science degree from Villanova University.

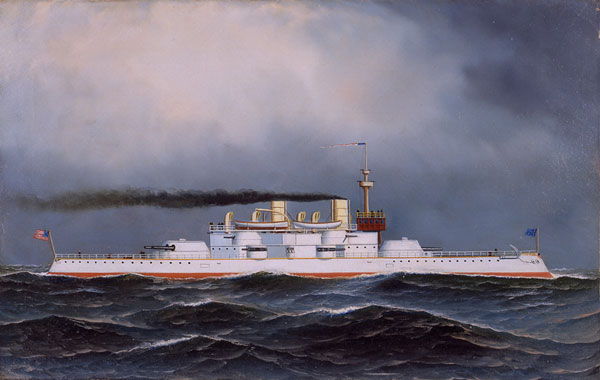
USS Massachusetts (BB-2) (painting by Antonio Jacobsen)

Soon after the contracts for the battleships were awarded, he resigned from the Navy to work as Superintendent of Construction for William Cramp & Sons Shipbuilding Company, the shipyard that won the lead contract.

In January 1895, Nixon leased the Crescent Shipyard in Elizabeth, New Jersey, and launched his own business. His superintendent-in-charge was Arthur Leopold Busch, another former William Cramp & Sons shipbuilder and naval architect, who had come from Great Britain to Philadelphia in 1892. Under Nixon and Busch, the yard built many vessels, including torpedo boats USS Nicholson (TB-29) and USS O'Brien (TB-30), cruiser USS Chattanooga (CL-18), monitor USS Florida (BM-9), gunboat USS Annapolis (PG-10), and Anstice yacht (1902) that was renamed the Sandy Hook.

Beginning in December 1896, the Crescent Shipyard built the United States' first submarines, including the USS Holland (SS-1). The submarine's success led to an order for more submarines of the "Holland Type" by the Navy. Those subs, known as the Plunger-class submarines, were built at the Crescent Shipyard and the Union Iron Works, a shipbuilding firm near Mare Island Naval Shipyard, 20 miles north of San Francisco. These submarines became America's first fleet of underwater fighting vessels, and were operated by the United States Navy on both coasts.

These submarines also gave birth to a new company, founded by John Philip Holland on February 7, 1899. His company was then known as the Holland Torpedo Boat Company and (after 1904) the Electric Boat Company.

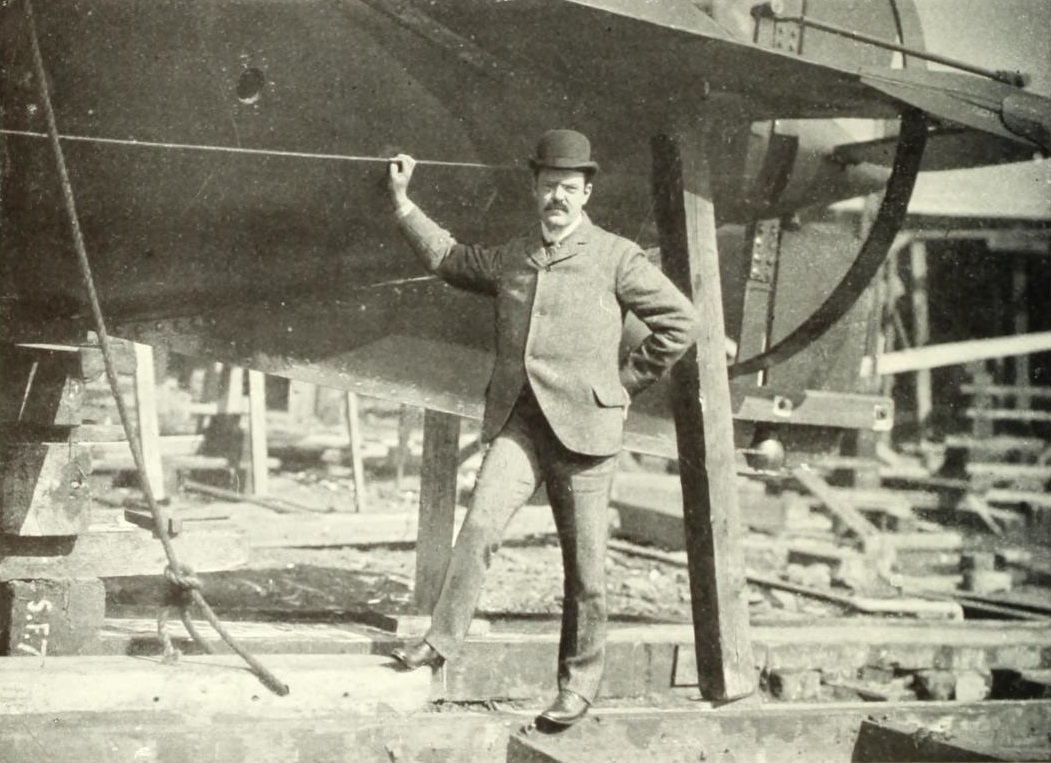
Lewis Nixon at Crescent Shipyard

Nixon also founded the International Smokeless Powder and Dynamite Company of Parlin, New Jersey. E. I. du Pont de Nemours and Company acquired it company from Nixon in 1904, forming part of what would soon be deemed DuPont's unlawful monopoly of the gunpowder industry.

Nixon also founded the United States Long Distance Automobile Company. From 1901 to 1903, its Jersey City, New Jersey, factory manufactured gasoline-powered cars "to meet the requirements of those who seek simplicity of construction, economy in running and unusual strength and durability." In January 1904, the company became Standard Motor Construction Company, which manufactured a larger car called a "Standard" through 1905. The auto lines were then sold to Hewitt Motor Co. of New York City. Nixon continued to serve as Standard Motor Construction's president into the next decade, when it was a major manufacturer of marine engines.

In 1902, promoter John W. Young persuaded Nixon to preside over the consolidation of Crescent Shipyard with six other shipyards on the East and West Coasts, to form a single shipbuilding trust, under the name United States Shipbuilding Company. Unfortunately, "the one thing [the consolidated firms] lacked, individually and collectively, was a realistic prospect of earning sustained profits." As the president of the new company, Nixon had convinced Charles M. Schwab, the U.S. Steel Corporation president and Bethlehem Steel owner, to help underwrite the business, while Schwab agreed to add Bethlehem Steel to the venture. However, the terms that Nixon and Schwab had negotiated for Schwab's financing were so one-sided in favor of Schwab and Bethlehem Steel that, when United States Shipbuilding failed almost immediately, it damaged the business reputations of both Nixon and Schwab. Within a year of its incorporation, the company's mortgage-holders forced it into receivership. It emerged from receivership, without Nixon, as Bethlehem Steel and Shipbuilding Company, in 1904. One of its first actions was to close Crescent Shipyard. By then, Nixon had re-entered the shipbuilding business by leasing a yard in Perth Amboy, New Jersey.

From late 1904 to January 1906, Nixon was in Russia supervising the construction of ten torpedo boats for the navy of Czar Nicholas II.

Nixon's shipbuilding expertise was called upon after the sinking of the RMS Titanic. Nixon suggested numerous changes including the required use of wireless communication devices on ships. He also suggested that ships have a more efficient way of reversing.

In 1910, Müller-Ury completed a three-quarter-length seated portrait of Nixon that was exhibited at Knoedler's that December.

From 1915 until his death, Nixon was president of the Nixon Nitration Works, in what is now the Nixon section of Edison, New Jersey. A 1924 explosion and resulting fire destroyed much of the Works, which was then rebuilt and resumed operations.

== Public service and political activism ==
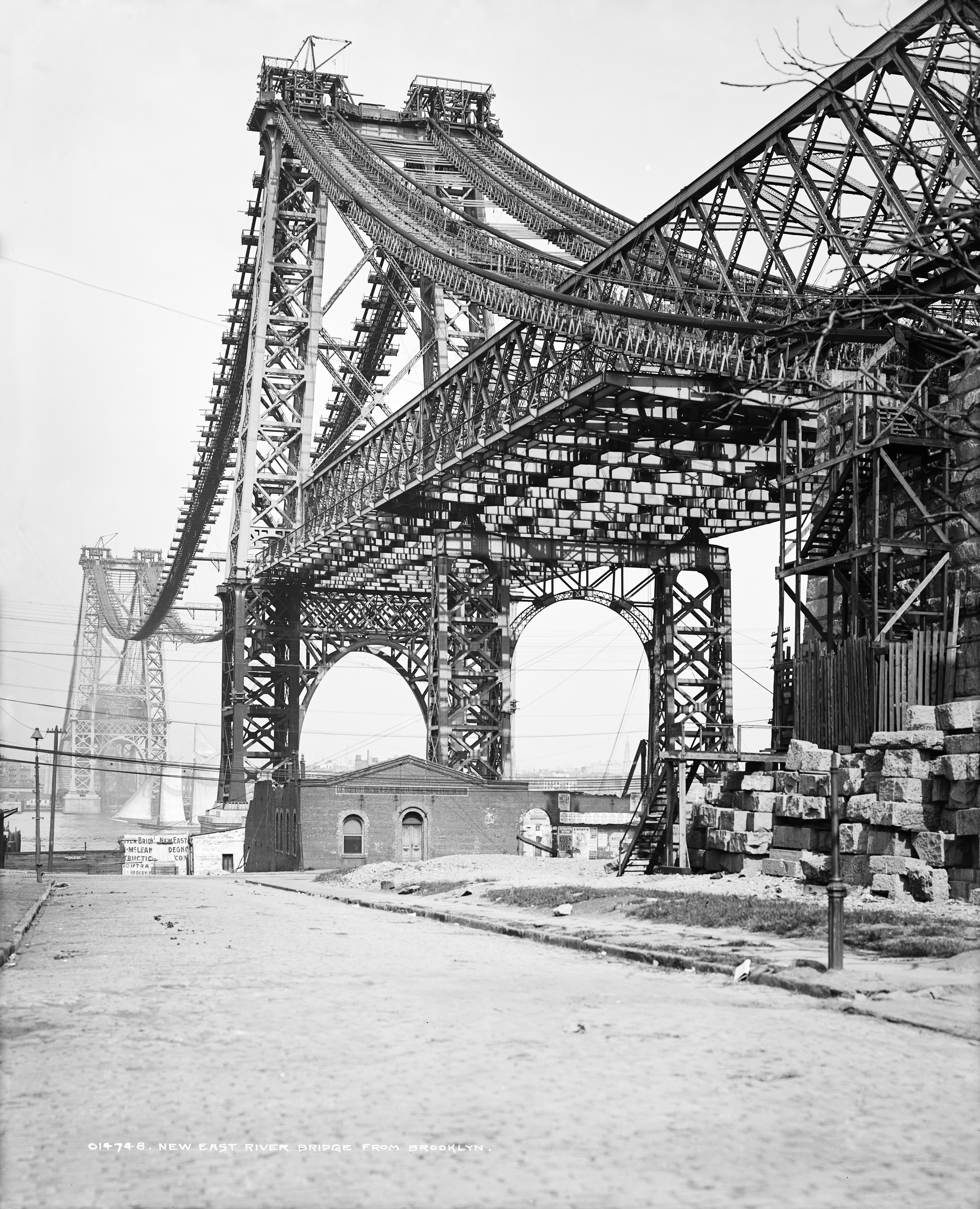
Williamsburg Bridge during construction

In 1895, the New York Legislature authorized the East River Bridge Commission to undertake a second span across the river, ultimately known as the Williamsburg Bridge. In January 1898, New York City Mayor Robert A. Van Wyck sacked the entire membership of the Commission after he had complained of its slow and expensive pace. He appointed Nixon as the Commission's new president. Nixon continued to serve as the Commission's president during the bridge's construction until the Commission's powers were transferred to the Commissioner of Bridges on January 1, 1902.

Nixon was active in Democratic Party politics. In December 1901, the longtime Tammany Hall boss Richard Croker chose Nixon as his successor. Croker's choice of Nixon surprised observers because Nixon had spoken out against vice and corruption in City government and seemingly had nothing in common with Croker. Nixon resigned several months later and explained, "I find that I cannot retain my self-respect and remain the leader of the Tammany organization."

He was a delegate to the Democratic National Convention seven times. A friend and supporter of three-time Democratic presidential nominee William Jennings Bryan, Nixon played a key role in the 1908 Democratic National Convention, where he chaired the subcommittee on the platform, overcame Tammany's initial hostility to Bryan to deliver New York's delegation for him, and was urged as Bryan's running-mate.

A resident of Staten Island, Nixon served from 1914 to 1915 as the borough's Acting Commissioner of Public Works and its consulting engineer.

In 1919, New York Governor Al Smith appointed Nixon as the State's Superintendent of Public Works, and then as New York City's Regulatory Public Service Commissioner.

== Personal life and legacy ==
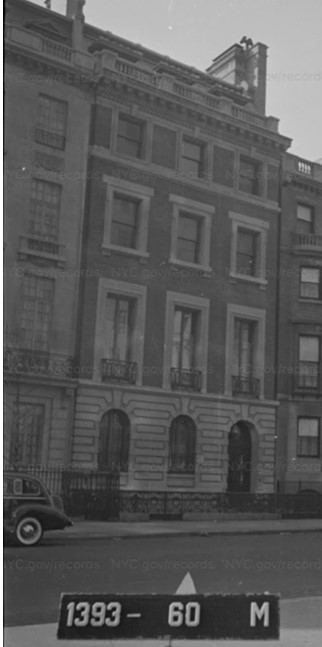
Ripley House at 16 East 79th Street in 1940s

In 1891, Nixon married Sally Lewis Wood of Washington, D.C., a descendant of General Andrew Lewis of Colonial Virginia.

Their son was Stanhope Wood Nixon (April 1, 1894 – January 12, 1958), whom Swiss-born American artist Adolfo Müller-Ury (1862–1947) would paint full-length in Scottish costume in 1902–1903.

In 1929, he purchased 16 East 79th Street built by Sidney Dillon Ripley. He moved in with Sally and Stanhope. Sally would die in the house on June 15, 1937.

Lewis died on September 23, 1940, at Monmouth Memorial Hospital in Long Branch, New Jersey.

Through Stanhope, Nixon was the grandfather and namesake of Lewis Nixon III (1918-1995), a US Army officer in "Easy" Company of the 506th Parachute Infantry Regiment of the 101st Airborne Division during World War II. Nixon III parachuted into combat on D-Day, participated in Operation Market Garden, and fought in the Battle of the Bulge; he and his friend Richard Winters later worked for Nixon Nitrate and were made famous by Stephen E. Ambrose's 1992 book Band of Brothers.
