= 1924 Nixon Nitration Works disaster =

Industrial explosion in New Jersey, United States

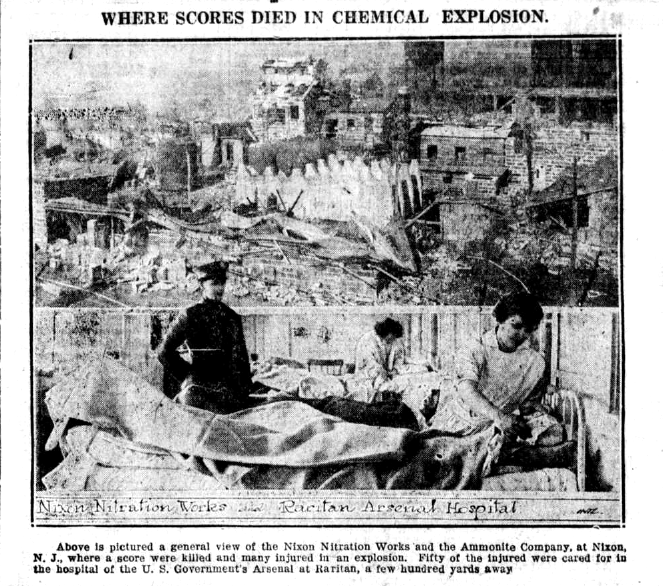
- Newspaper photo of the explosion
- Date: March 1, 1924
- Time: 11:15 a.m. (EST)
- Venue: Nixon Nitration Works
- Location: Nixon, New Jersey, U.S.; 40°32′18″N 74°22′43″W
- Type: Explosion, fire, industrial accident
- Deaths: 20
- Injuries: 100
- Property damage: 40 buildings destroyed
- Convicted: Ammonite Corporation
- Sentence: $9,000 fine (equivalent to $165,000 in 2025)
- Litigation: Nixon Nitration Works ordered to pay $12,000 to widow of victim in civil suit (equivalent to $225,000 in 2025)

The 1924 Nixon Nitration Works disaster was an explosion and fire that claimed many lives and destroyed several square miles of New Jersey factories. It began on March 1, 1924, about 11:15 a.m., when an explosion destroyed a building in Nixon, New Jersey (an area within present-day Edison, New Jersey) used for processing ammonium nitrate. The explosion touched off fires in surrounding buildings in the Nixon Nitration Works that contained other highly flammable materials. The disaster killed twenty people, destroyed forty buildings, and demolished the "tiny industrial town of Nixon, New Jersey."

== The setting ==
The Nixon Nitration Works, which included a number of plants, covered about 12 square miles (3,100 ha) on the Raritan River, near New Brunswick, in the Nixon neighborhood of what was then officially known as Raritan Township (later changed to Edison). It was created in 1915 by naval architect and industrialist Lewis Nixon to supply European nations with gunpowder and other materials for World War I. When the war ended, its facilities were put to broader uses, involving other explosive materials.

The company manufactured cellulose nitrate (also known as nitrocellulose and guncotton), a highly flammable material that was the first man-made plastic. Finished cellulose nitrate was piled in 50-by-20-inch (127 by 51 cm) sheets in surrounding buildings.

Some 300 feet (91 m) from the Works' nitrocellulose buildings sat a storage house leased to the Ammonite Company, which used the building to salvage the contents of artillery shells for use as agricultural fertilizer. That salvage was performed after the trinitrotoluene (TNT) was extracted from the shells at the nearby Raritan Arsenal by the Columbia Storage Company, owned by aeronautic pioneer Charles A. Levine. The Ammonite building reportedly contained 1 million US gallons (3,800 m^{3}) of stored ammonium nitrate, plus 15 tank cars that each held 90,000 US gallons (340,000 L) of ammonium nitrate in the process of crystallization.

== The disaster ==
The disaster began when ammonium nitrate in the Ammonite building exploded. Windows for a mile around the scene were broken inward and doors were blown from their hinges. The blast shook Staten Island, where business buildings in the Stapleton and St. George neighborhoods rocked, windows rattled, and doors were slammed. It was felt in lower New York City, Brooklyn, and 50 miles (80 km) away in Mineola, New York.

The flaming debris from the explosion soon set cellulose nitrate sheets afire in nearby buildings. Fires began to consume other buildings as well, including the offices of the Nitration Works. Six hours after the explosion, flames were still burning over an area of one square mile.

As darkness fell, shifting winds suddenly began fanning the flames toward freight cars on a siding and toward the nearby Raritan Arsenal where 500,000 high-explosive shells were stored. Four of the arsenal's high-explosive magazines had been crushed by the initial explosion and the roofs of two others blown in. Through the efforts of exhausted firefighters, the fire did not reach the arsenal.

== The human toll ==
Two days after the explosion, newspapers reported that 18 people were killed, two were missing (and presumed killed), and 15 others remained hospitalized. The blast injured 100 people. The dead included the wife and three children of an employee of the plant who lived 100 yards (91 m) from the scene, a stenographer working at the plant, and 13 workmen who were repairing the roof of the building where the blast occurred.

== Inquiries ==
Prosecutor John E. Toolan of Middlesex County, New Jersey, began an inquiry two days after the blast. Among those summoned to appear for the inquiry were Lewis Nixon, his son Stanhope Wood Nixon, and R. Norris Shreve, then president of the Ammonite Co. Secretary of War John W. Weeks also ordered an inquiry, for the more limited purpose of determining whether the Raritan Arsenal was in any way responsible for the explosion.

Some theorized that the blast was triggered by small quantities of TNT that remained in the ammonium nitrate at the Ammonite facility after the ammonium nitrate had been removed from the shells. Lewis Nixon embraced this explanation. Ammonite disputed this theory, asserting that the average content of TNT in the salvaged ammonium nitrate was only two-tenths of one percent. However, under questioning, Shreve acknowledged that this would have caused 120 pounds (54 kg) of TNT filtered from ammonium nitrate to flow every day into a small stream on the site, and that there might have been "several percent" of TNT in tanks of ammonium nitrate remaining at the site. Major A.S. Casand, commander of the arsenal, also disagreed that residual TNT was to blame, and believed that the explosion was due to conditions in the plant.

== Aftermath ==
In the immediate aftermath of the explosion, federal, state, and local officials considered whether plants containing explosives should be banned from Middlesex County.

One month after the disaster, Ammonite sued Nixon Nitration Works for $400,000 in damages, alleging that the explosion was due to the Nixon company's carelessness. In 1928, a federal judge dismissed the claims and counterclaims between Ammonite and Nixon Nitration Works, leaving Columbia Salvage Company as the only defendant in the suit.

In April 1924, Ammonite Corporation was indicted on fifteen counts of involuntary manslaughter and initially pleaded not guilty. The following year Ammonite pleaded guilty to charges arising from the explosion and was fined a total of $9,000, reflecting a $600 fine for each of 15 employees killed in the blast.

In May 1924, Nixon Nitration Works was ordered to pay $12,000 to the widow of a victim who worked for that company.

Ammonite dissolved in 1926, for reasons attributed to the explosion. Ammonite owner Shreve, already a renowned chemical and industrial engineer, later joined the faculty at Purdue University, where he became a well-respected scholar, author, and teacher. A residence hall at Purdue is named in honor of Mr. and Mrs. Shreve.

Charles A. Levine earned a fortune as a result of his companies' contracts with the federal government to salvage shells. In 1927, he financed an effort to become the first to fly from New York to Paris, only to have Charles A. Lindbergh reach Paris first while Levine's plane was grounded by a restraining order obtained by the navigator he had employed. Levine dissolved the injunction, freed the plane, and became the first transcontinental air passenger, reaching Germany from New York in a flight two weeks following Lindbergh's. Meanwhile, the federal government sued Levine's companies, claiming overcharges for their salvage work. Many lawsuits and prosecutions of Levine and his companies followed, including prosecutions for counterfeiting French coins, conspiring to smuggle tungsten powder from Canada, and smuggling an alien refugee from a German concentration camp into the United States from Mexico.

The Nixon Nitration Works was rebuilt on the site, and returned to the business of cellulose nitrate manufacturing. Lewis Nixon died on September 23, 1940. His son Stanhope Wood Nixon, who assumed control of the business, had few of his father's qualities, and many vices. After World War II, the plastics industry evolved from nitrate-based products to acetate-based products, and the company failed to make the transition. In 1951, as the company shrank, it gave 48 acres (19 ha) of land, and a dam, to New Brunswick.

The site of the Works is now a part of Middlesex County College and Raritan Center Industrial Park.

In 1954, the citizens of Middlesex County's Raritan Township renamed their community by referendum. The name Edison was chosen over Nixon. However, the Nixon name is still used by the local post office and postal district.
