= Horatio Bottomley =

English journalist, editor and politician (1860–1933)

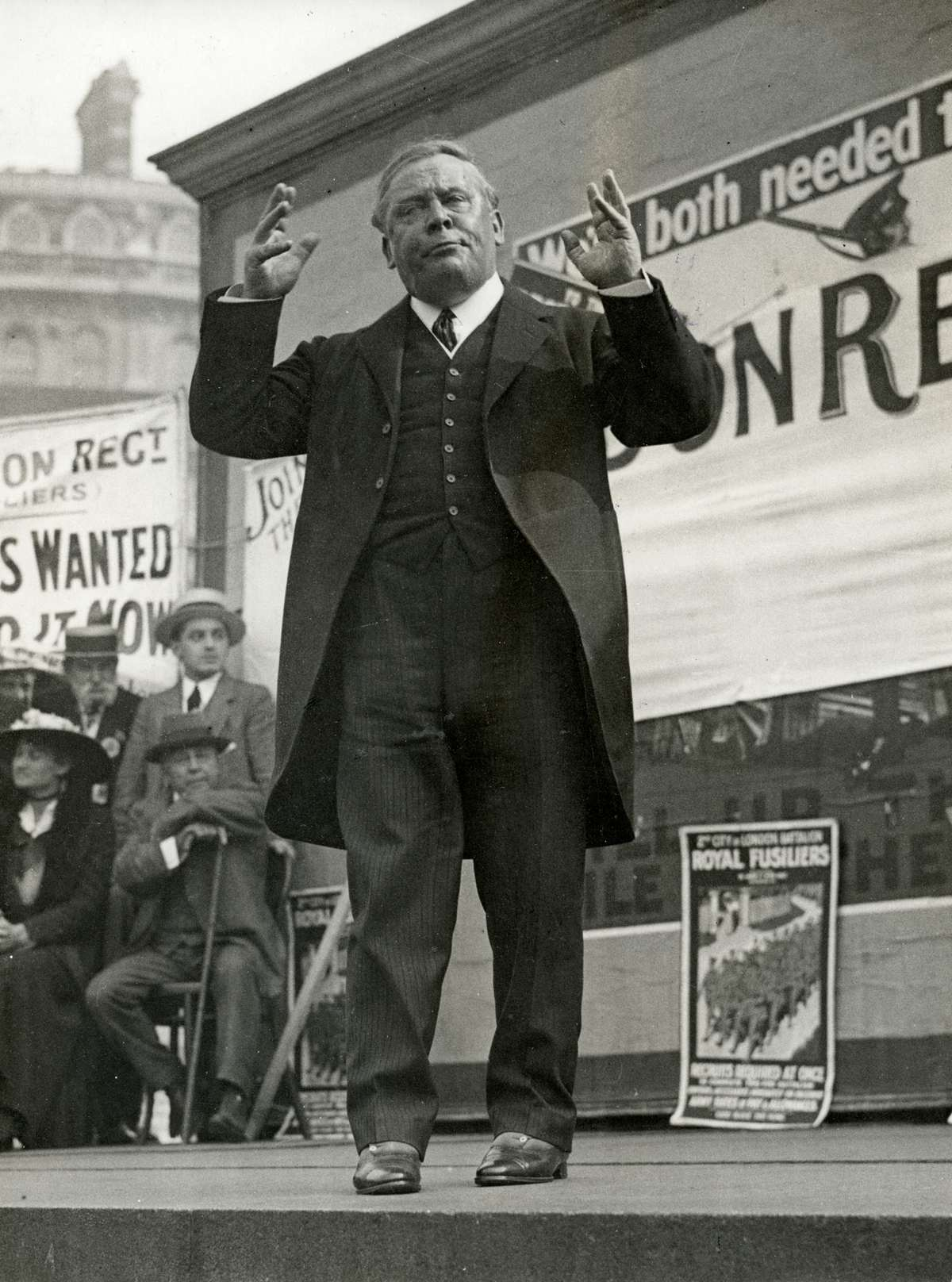
- Bottomley in 1915

Member of Parliament for Hackney South
- In office 28 December 1918 – 1 August 1922
- Preceded by: Hector Morison
- Succeeded by: Clifford Erskine-Bolst
- In office 8 February 1906 – 16 May 1912
- Preceded by: Thomas Herbert Robertson
- Succeeded by: Hector Morison

Personal details
- Born: 23 March 1860 London, England
- Died: 26 May 1933 (aged 73) London, England
- Party: Liberal (1906–1912); Independent (1918–1922)

Horatio William Bottomley (23 March 1860 – 26 May 1933) was an English financier, journalist, editor, newspaper proprietor, swindler, and Member of Parliament. He is best known for his editorship of the popular magazine John Bull, and for his nationalistic oratory during the First World War. His career came to a sudden end when, in 1922, he was convicted of fraud and sentenced to seven years' imprisonment.

Bottomley spent five years in an orphanage before beginning his career, aged 14, as an errand boy. Subsequent experience as a solicitor's clerk gave him a useful knowledge of English law, which he later put to effective use in his court appearances. After working as a shorthand writer and court reporter, at 24 he founded his own publishing company, which launched numerous magazines and papers, including, in 1888, the Financial Times. He overreached with an ambitious public flotation of his company, which led to his first arraignment on fraud charges in 1893. Despite evidence of malpractice, Bottomley, who defended himself, was acquitted. He subsequently amassed a fortune as a promoter of shares in gold-mining companies.

In 1906 Bottomley entered parliament as the Liberal Party member for Hackney South. In the same year, he founded the popular magazine John Bull, which became a platform for Bottomley's trenchant populist views. Financial extravagance and mismanagement continued to blight his career, and in 1912 he had to resign from parliament after being declared bankrupt. The outbreak of war in 1914 revived his fortunes; as a journalist and orator, Bottomley became a leading propagandist for the war effort, addressing well over 300 public meetings. His influence was such that it was widely expected that he would enter the War cabinet, although he received no such offer.

In 1918, having been discharged from bankruptcy, Bottomley re-entered parliament as an independent member. In the following year, he launched his fraudulent "Victory Bonds" scheme which, when exposed, led to his conviction, imprisonment and expulsion from parliament. Released in 1927, he attempted unsuccessfully to relaunch his business career and eked out a living by lecturing and appearances in music halls. His final years before his death in 1933 were spent in poverty.

== Life ==
=== Family background and childhood ===
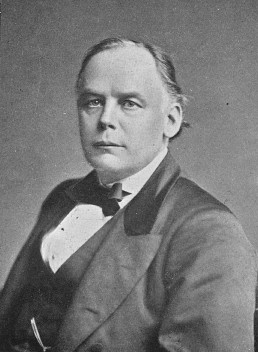
Charles Bradlaugh, whose facial resemblance to Bottomley helped foster the rumour that he was the latter's biological father

Bottomley was born on 23 March 1860, at 16 Saint Peter's Street, Bethnal Green in London, the second child and only son of William King Bottomley, a tailor's cutter, and Elizabeth, née Holyoake. William Bottomley's background is obscure, but Elizabeth belonged to a family of well-known radical agitators—her brother George Jacob Holyoake was a founder of the Secularist movement and in later life a leading figure in the growth of Co-operative societies.

Among Holyoake's close associates was Charles Bradlaugh, who founded the National Republican League and became a controversial Member of Parliament. A longstanding friendship between Bradlaugh and Elizabeth Holyoake led to rumours that he, not William Bottomley, was Horatio's biological father—a suggestion that Bottomley, in later life, was prone to encourage. The evidence is circumstantial, mainly based on the marked facial resemblance between Bradlaugh and Bottomley.

William Bottomley died in 1864 and Elizabeth a year later. Horatio and his elder sister, Florence, were initially looked after by their uncle William Holyoake, an artist living in the London district of Marylebone. After a year they were boarded out to foster-parents, at their uncle George Jacob's expense. This arrangement lasted until 1869 when Florence was formally adopted by her foster-family. At this point Holyoake felt unable to continue supporting Horatio financially, and arranged for him to be admitted to Josiah Mason's orphanage in Erdington, Birmingham. This was Horatio's home for the following five years. Some biographers have emphasised the cruelty and humiliation of his time there; while discipline was certainly harsh, Horatio received a useful basic education, and won prizes for sporting activities. In later life he showed no resentment towards the institution, which he often visited, telling the children that "any success I have achieved in life started at this place."

In 1874, when Horatio was 14 and due to leave the orphanage, he ran away without waiting for the formalities. His aunt Caroline Praill—his mother's sister—who lived in nearby Edgbaston, gave him a home, while he worked as an errand boy in a Birmingham building firm. This arrangement lasted only a few months before Horatio, impatient to be reunited with his sister from whom he had been separated for six years, went to London where he began an apprenticeship with a wood engraver.

=== Early career ===
==== First steps ====
Bottomley soon gave up his apprenticeship, and after a series of humdrum jobs found work in the offices of a City firm of solicitors. Here he picked up a working knowledge of English legal procedures and was soon carrying a workload far exceeding the normal duties of an office junior. With his uncle's encouragement he learned shorthand at Pitman's College, a skill which helped him to get a better job with a larger legal firm. He also came into closer contact with the Holyoake circle, where he acted as an unpaid assistant in the group's publishing activities. He met Bradlaugh, who encouraged the young man to read more widely and introduced him to the ideas of Charles Darwin, Thomas Huxley and John Stuart Mill. Bottomley was strongly influenced by Bradlaugh, whom he considered his political and spiritual mentor.

As Bottomley emerged from adolescence to maturity he began to show signs of the characteristics that would be much in evidence in his later life: greed for fleshly pleasures, a thirst for fame, spontaneous generosity, combined with a charm that, according to his biographer Julian Symons, could "tempt the banknotes out of men's pockets".

In 1880 Bottomley married Eliza Norton, the daughter of a debt collector. Bottomley's biographers have tended to regard this early, unambitious marriage as a mistake on his part; she was not equipped, intellectually or socially, to help him advance in the world. They had a daughter, Florence, who married firstly American millionaire Jefferson Davis Cohn, and secondly successful South African planter Gilbert Moreland. In the year of his marriage, Bottomley left his job to become a full-time shorthand writer for Walpole's, a firm that provided recording and transcription services for the law courts. His competence impressed his employers sufficiently for them, in 1883, to offer him a partnership, and the firm became Walpole and Bottomley.

==== Publishing entrepreneur ====
Bottomley's association with Bradlaugh had awakened his interests in publishing and politics, and in 1884 he launched his first entrepreneurial venture, a magazine called the Hackney Hansard. This journal recorded the business of Hackney's local "parliament"—essentially a debating society that mirrored the proceedings at Westminster. Advertisements from local tradesmen kept the paper mildly profitable. Bottomley produced a sister-paper, the Battersea Hansard, covering that borough's local parliament, before merging the two into The Debater.

In 1885 he formed the Catherine Street Publishing Association and, using borrowed capital, acquired or started several magazines and papers. These included, among others, the Municipal Review, a prestigious local government publication; Youth, a boys' paper on which Alfred Harmsworth, the future press magnate Lord Northcliffe, worked as a sub-editor; and the Financial Times. The last-named was set up to rival the Financial News, London's first specialist business paper, which had been founded in 1884 by Harry Marks, a former sewing-machine salesman. In 1886 Bottomley's company acquired its own printing works through a merger with the printing firm of MacRae and Co., and after the absorption of another advertising and printing firm, became MacRae, Curtice and Company.

At the age of 26, Bottomley became the company's chairman. His advance in the business world was attracting wider notice, and in 1887 he was invited by the Liberal Party in Hornsey to be their candidate in a parliamentary by-election. He accepted, and although defeated by Henry Stephens, the ink magnate, fought a strong campaign which won him a congratulatory letter from William Gladstone. His business affairs were proceeding less serenely; he quarrelled with his partner Douglas MacRae, and the two decided to separate. Bottomley described the "Quixotic impulse" that led him to let MacRae divide the assets: "He was a printer, and I was a journalist—but he took the papers and left me the printing works".

==== Hansard Publishing Union ====
Sir Henry Hawkins, the judge before whom Bottomley appeared, and was acquitted, on fraud charges in 1893

Undismayed by the loss of his papers, Bottomley embarked on an ambitious expansion scheme. On the basis of a lucrative contract to print the Hansard reports of debates in the Westminster parliament, at the beginning of 1889 he founded the Hansard Publishing Union Limited, floated on the London Stock Exchange with a capital of £500,000. Bottomley boosted the company's credentials by persuading several notable City figures to join the company's board of directors. These included Sir Henry Isaacs, the Lord Mayor-elect of London, Coleridge Kennard, co-founder (with Harry Marks) of the London Evening News, and Sir Roper Lethbridge, the Conservative MP for Kensington North.

This board approved the purchase by Bottomley of several printing businesses—he used intermediaries to disguise his considerable personal profits from these transactions. He also persuaded the board to give him £75,000 as a down payment for some publishing firms in Austria for which he was negotiating, although the firms were not acquired. These outgoings and other expenses absorbed the Union's capital, and with few significant revenue streams it quickly ran out of money. Nonetheless, without any statement of accounts, in July 1890 Bottomley announced a profit for the year of £40,877 and declared a dividend of eight percent.

The funds for the dividend payment were raised by a debenture of £50,000. By the end of 1890, many City figures were suspicious of the Hansard Union, and were calling it "Bottomley's swindle". Despite Bottomley's outward optimism, in December 1890 the company defaulted on the payment of debenture interest and in May 1891, amid growing rumours of insolvency, the debenture holders petitioned for the company's compulsory winding-up. In the same month Bottomley, who had taken at least £100,000 from the company, filed a petition for bankruptcy. Under examination by the Official Receiver, he could not say where the money had gone and professed total ignorance of the company's book-keeping. After further enquiries, the Board of Trade instituted prosecutions for fraud against Bottomley, Isaacs and two others.

The trial began in the High Court of Justice on 30 January 1893, before Sir Henry Hawkins; Bottomley conducted his own defence. To most observers the case against him seemed impregnable. It was established that, through his nominees, Bottomley had repeatedly bought companies for far less than the prices approved by the Hansard Union directors, and had pocketed the difference. Bottomley did not deny this, insisting that use of nominees was an accepted commercial practice and that his actual profits had been much smaller than reported; his expenses, he said, had been enormous.

He was helped in his case by the slackness with which the prosecution presented its evidence, and their failure to call key witnesses. He was further helped by the indulgence which Hawkins showed him, and by his own convincing oratory. The essence of his argument was that he was the victim of machinations by the Official Receiver and the Debenture Corporation, who had been determined to win prestige by bringing Bottomley down and wrecking his company. On 26 April, after Hawkins had summed up massively in his favour, Bottomley was acquitted, along with the other defendants.

=== Company promoter, newspaper proprietor, would-be politician ===
The Hansard Union case, far from damaging Bottomley's reputation, had left a general impression that he was a financial genius. He avoided the stigma of bankruptcy by arranging a scheme of repayment with his creditors, and swiftly embarked on a new career promoting Western Australian gold mining shares. The discovery of gold in Kalgoorlie and adjoining areas in the early 1890s had created an easily exploitable investment boom; as Bottomley's biographer Alan Hyman observes, "A hole in the ground ... could be boosted into a very promising gold-mine, and investors only found that they had backed a loser after the mine had been floated as a public company and they had paid hard cash for their shares".

By 1897, through skilful exploitation of demand and by frequent reconstruction of failing companies, Bottomley had accumulated a considerable personal fortune. It was, the historian A.J.A. Morris asserts, "a truly amazing success story, the product of reckless audacity, astonishing energy, and extreme good fortune". Bottomley won plaudits when he announced that he would pay £250,000 to the creditors of the Hansard Union; the bulk of this payment was offered in shares in one or other of his mining promotions.

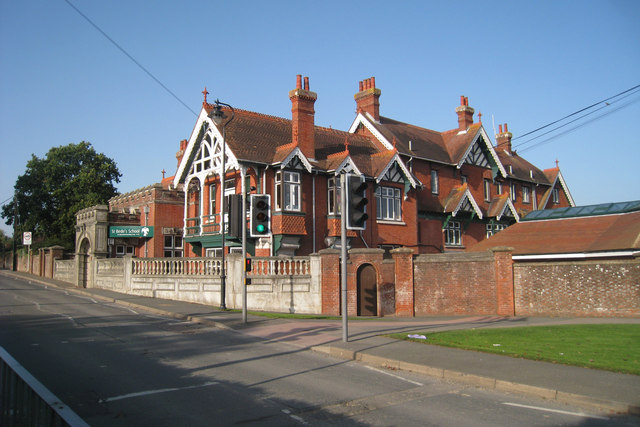
Bottomley's country home, "The Dicker", photographed in 2010. It forms part of St Bede's School.

As his wealth increased, Bottomley adopted an increasingly ostentatious lifestyle. In London he lived in a luxurious apartment in Pall Mall. He took numerous mistresses, whom he visited in several discreet flats in different districts of London. He owned several racehorses, which achieved prestigious victories—the Stewards' Cup at Goodwood, and the Cesarewitch at Newmarket—but he often lost large sums through unwise bets. Quite early in his rise to wealth he bought a modest property in Upper Dicker, near Eastbourne in East Sussex. He called it "The Dicker", and over the years extended and developed it into a large country mansion, where he entertained extravagantly.

Bottomley had retained his parliamentary ambitions and in 1890, before the Hansard Union crash, had been adopted as the Liberal candidate for North Islington. According to Symons, when he resigned the candidature on the commencement of bankruptcy proceedings, he had the constituency in his pocket. By 1900 his star was again in the ascendant, and he was invited by the Hackney South Liberals to be their candidate in that year's general election. He lost by only 280 votes, after a bitterly fought campaign in which Bottomley was described in a newspaper article as a "bare-faced swindler ... [whose] ... place is at the Old Bailey, not at Westminster". He was subsequently awarded £1,000 libel damages against the writer, Henry Hess.

By the turn of the 19th–20th centuries the boom in speculative shares had abated; some of Bottomley's fellow promoters, such as Whitaker Wright, were facing charges of fraud and misrepresentation. Bottomley ceased his operations, and resumed his earlier role of newspaper proprietor. In 1902 he bought a failing London evening paper, The Sun, to which he contributed a regular column, "The World, the Flesh and the Devil". Another feature was Bottomley's employment of celebrity guest editors for special editions; among these were the comedian Dan Leno, the cricketer Kumar Shri Ranjitsinhji and the labour leader Ben Tillett.

The paper was not a financial success, and Bottomley sold it in 1904. He had not given up altogether on speculative money-making schemes, and in 1905 began an association with the financier Ernest Hooley. Among their joint enterprises was the promotion of the defunct, dry Basingstoke Canal as a major inland waterway, the "London and South-Western Canal". Bottomley later made a substantial out-of-court settlement of an action brought by investors who had bought worthless shares in the canal. (Note: Hooley's and Bottomley's paths would cross several times in future years; they were inmates together in Wormwood Scrubs prison in 1922.)

=== Parliament, John Bull, bankruptcy ===
[I intend] to give the government an independent and, I hope, an intelligent support, so long as it proceeds on the lines of robust and healthy democracy, but I am also here to oppose all fads and 'isms and namby-pamby interference with the liberty and freedom of our common citizenship.

— Horatio Bottomley, maiden speech, House of Commons, 20 February 1906

In the general election of January 1906 Bottomley was again the Liberal candidate for Hackney South. After a vigorous campaign he defeated his Conservative opponent by more than 3,000—the largest Liberal majority in London, he informed the House of Commons in his maiden speech on 20 February 1906. According to Hyman, this speech was received in "chilling silence" by a House that was well aware of Bottomley's chequered reputation.

Over the following months and years, he overcame much of the initial hostility, partly by his self-deprecating good humour (as when he described himself as "more or less honourable") but also because his populist approach to legislation was attractive. He proposed rational reforms of the betting industry and of licensing hours and the introduction of state Old Age Pensions. Extra revenues could be raised, he suggested, by stamp duty on share transfers, taxes on foreign investment, and by appropriating dormant bank balances. He drew the government's attention to the long hours worked by domestic servants, and introduced a private bill limiting the working day to eight hours. He privately confided to the journalist Frank Harris that his ambition was to become Chancellor of the Exchequer.

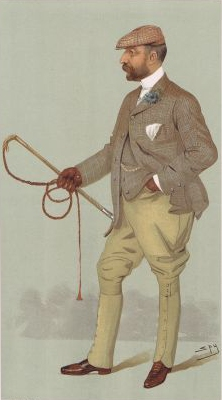
Ernest Hooley, the financier who was Bottomley's partner in several schemes

Alongside his parliamentary duties, Bottomley was engaged in launching his biggest and boldest publishing venture, the weekly news magazine John Bull, half of the initial capital for which was provided by Hooley. From its first issue on 12 May 1906 John Bull adopted a tabloid style that, despite occasional lapses in taste, proved immensely popular. Among its regular features, Bottomley revived his "The World, the Flesh and the Devil" column from The Sun, and also adapted that paper's slogan: "If you read it in John Bull, it is so". Bottomley persuaded Julius Elias, managing director of Odhams Limited, to handle the printing, but chaotic financial management meant that Odhams were rarely paid. This situation was resolved when the entire management of the magazine, including the handling of all receipts and payments, was transferred to Elias, leaving Bottomley free to concentrate on editing and journalism. Circulation rose rapidly, and by 1910 had reached half a million copies.

In June 1906 Bottomley announced the John Bull Investment Trust, in which, for a minimum subscription of £10, investors could share "that special and exclusive information which is obtainable only as the result of extensive City experience". Bottomley's earlier City activities were coming under scrutiny, particularly the multiple reconstructions of his now-bankrupt Joint Stock Trust Company. After a long investigation, which Bottomley did all he could to frustrate, in December 1908 he was summoned to appear at the Guildhall Justice Room, before a court of aldermen. (Note: Under English law, the Lord Mayor and aldermen of the City of London were empowered to act as magistrates.) As with the Hansard prosecution, the case against Bottomley appeared overwhelming; share issues in the Joint Stock Trust had been repeatedly re-issued, perhaps as many as six times. Once again Bottomley succeeded in obscuring the details and, by the power of his courtroom oratory, persuaded the court that the summons should be dismissed.

One of the prosecuting team at the Guildhall observed that it would be a long time before anyone risked another prosecution against Bottomley: "But he might ... grow careless, and then he will fail". Despite the adverse publicity, Bottomley was returned by the electors of Hackney South at each of the two 1910 general elections; his tactics included recruiting men in boots tipped and heeled with iron, who marched outside his opponent's meetings and rendered the speeches inaudible. In June 1910 he founded the John Bull League, with a mission to promote "commonsense business methods" into government; readers of the magazine could join the League for a shilling (5p) a year. Although still nominally a Liberal, Bottomley had become a trenchant critic of his party, and often aligned himself with the Conservative opposition in attacking Asquith's government.

Bottomley's parliamentary ambitions were suddenly halted in 1912 when he was successfully sued for £49,000 by one of his Joint Stock Trust victims. Unable to pay, and with massive debts, he was bankrupted with liabilities totalling £233,000. Since bankrupts are ineligible to sit in the House of Commons, he had to resign his seat; after his departure, the future Lord Chancellor, F. E. Smith, wrote that "[h]is absence from the House of Commons has impoverished the public stock of gaiety, of cleverness, of common sense". (Note: The historian G. R. Searle has observed that Smith, later Lord Birkenhead, always had a soft spot for Bottomley, in whom he may have seen certain of his own characteristics.) Before his bankruptcy, Bottomley had ensured that his main assets were legally owned by relatives or nominees, and was thus able to continue his extravagant lifestyle. John Bull remained an ample source of funds, and Bottomley boasted that although nominally bankrupt, "I never had a better time in my life—plenty of money and everything else I want as well".

=== Sweepstakes and lotteries ===
After leaving the House of Commons, Bottomley denounced Parliament in the pages of John Bull as a "musty, rusty, corrupt system" that urgently needed replacement. Through his newly formed Business League he addressed large crowds as he called for government run by businessmen not politicians. As always, Bottomley's lifestyle required fresh sources of income, and in 1912 John Bull began to organise competitions for cash prizes. Bottomley successfully sued the secretary of the Anti-Gambling League for suggesting that many of the prizewinners were John Bull nominees or employees, but received only a farthing in damages. (Note: The farthing was the smallest coin in UK legal tender, worth one quarter of a pre-1971 penny. Its award as damages was a recognised gesture of contempt.) These competitions helped to raise the magazine's circulation to 1.5 million.

In 1913 Bottomley met a Birmingham businessman, Reuben Bigland, and together they began running large-scale sweepstakes and lotteries, operated from Switzerland to circumvent English law. Again doubts arose about the genuineness of declared winners; the winner of the £25,000 sweepstake for the 1914 Derby proved on enquiry to be the sister-in-law of one of Bottomley's close associates. Bottomley insisted this was a coincidence; years later, it was revealed that all but £250 of the prize had been paid into a bank account controlled by Bottomley.

=== First World War: orator and propagandist ===
Front page of the Daily Mirror, 10 September 1915, illustrating Bottomley's public meetings on behalf of the war effort

Bottomley initially misread the international crisis that developed during the summer of 1914. After the murder of Archduke Franz Ferdinand of Austria on 28 June in Sarajevo, allegedly with Serbian complicity, John Bull described Serbia as "a hotbed of cold-blooded conspiracy and subterfuge", and called for it to be wiped from the map of Europe. When Britain declared war on the Central Powers on 4 August, Bottomley quickly reversed his position, and within a fortnight was demanding the elimination of Germany. John Bull campaigned relentlessly against the "Germhuns", and against British citizens carrying German-sounding surnames—the danger of "the enemy within" was a persistent Bottomley theme.

On 14 September 1914 he addressed a large crowd at the London Opera House, the first of many mass meetings at which he deployed his trademark phrase, "the Prince of Peace, (pointing to the Star of Bethlehem) that leads us on to God"—words which according to Symons moved many hearts. At the "Great War Rally" at the Royal Albert Hall on 14 January 1915, Bottomley was fully in tune with the national temper when he proclaimed: "We are fighting all that is worst in the world, the product of a debased civilisation".

During the war, in his self-appointed role as spokesman for the "man in the street", Bottomley addressed more than 300 public meetings, in all parts of the country. For recruitment rallies he provided his services free; for others, he took a percentage of the takings. (Note: Hyman quotes a summary, provided by The Daily News, of the financial details of a meeting in Swindon. Total takings after Entertainment Tax were £125, of which £88 went to Bottomley and the balance (£37) to a servicemen's benevolent fund. Messinger records that Bottomley generally pocketed between 65 and 85 per cent of the proceeds of these meetings.) His influence was enormous; the writer D. H. Lawrence, who detested Bottomley, thought that he represented the national spirit and that he might become prime minister.

In March 1915 Bottomley began a regular weekly column for the Sunday Pictorial. On 4 May, after the sinking of the Lusitania, he used this column to label the Germans as "unnatural freaks", and called for their extermination. Britain's war effort, he maintained, was being hampered by squeamish politicians; he reserved particular venom for the Labour Party leaders, Keir Hardie and Ramsay MacDonald, who opposed the war, and demanded they be tried for high treason. Macdonald's riposte—to label Bottomley "a man of doubtful parentage who had lived all his life on the threshold of jail"—backfired when the latter published Macdonald's birth certificate which showed that the Labour leader was himself illegitimate. Bottomley also criticized the neutrality policy of the United States, arguing the USA was using the war to increase its economic power at the expense of the European powers. Bottomley launched a series of attacks on President Woodrow Wilson that lasted until the US entered the war in 1917.

Although the government was wary of Bottomley it was prepared to make use of his influence and popularity. In April 1915 the then Chancellor of the Exchequer, David Lloyd George, asked him to speak to shipworkers on the River Clyde, who were threatening industrial action. After Bottomley's intervention the strike was averted. In 1917 he visited the front in France, where, after dining with Field Marshal Sir Douglas Haig, he was a considerable success with the troops; his later visit to the Grand Fleet at Scapa Flow was a similar success. He hoped that these morale-boosting activities would lead to a formal government position, but although from time to time there were rumours of a Cabinet post, no appointment was announced. In the later stages of the war Bottomley was a regular critic of the National War Aims Committee (NWAC), a cross-party parliamentary body formed in 1917 to revitalise Britain's commitment to victory and to underline the justice of its cause. Bottomley described the committee as "a dodge for doctoring public opinion", and in January 1918 told David Lloyd George, who had become prime minister in December 1916, that NWAC had failed in its purpose and should be replaced by a Director of Propaganda—but to no avail.

In 1917, The Royal Magazine published Bottomley's article "Why Not a Women's Parliament?", suggested as a form of compromise with what he termed the "Suffragette Problem". He suggested that the war would guarantee that "things will never be the same again" and the status of women be profoundly changed.

=== Postwar career ===
==== Parliament again ====
Although in 1912 Bottomley had expressed contempt for parliament, he privately hankered to return. When the war ended in November 1918 and a general election was announced, he knew that to be a candidate in that election he needed a discharge from his bankruptcy. A payment of £34,000 in cash and bonds, and some hasty reorganisation of outstanding debts, was sufficient for an acquiescent Official Receiver to grant the discharge just in time for Bottomley to hand in his nomination papers in Hackney South. In the general election on 14 December 1918 he stood as an independent, under the slogan "Bottomley, Brains and Business", and achieved a massive victory, with almost 80 per cent of the votes cast. "I am now prepared to proceed to Westminster to run the show", he informed a local newspaper. He would be, he said, the "unofficial prime minister ... watching the government's every move" to ensure that it acted in the interests of "our soldiers, sailors and citizens".

The 1918 parliament was dominated by Lloyd George's Liberal–Conservative coalition, which faced a fragmented and unorganised opposition. In May 1919 Bottomley announced the formation of his "People's League", which he hoped would develop into a fully fledged political party with a programme opposing both organised labour and organised capital. No mass movement emerged, but Bottomley joined with other Independent MPs to form the Independent Parliamentary Group, with a distinct policy stance including the enforcement of war reparations, the superiority of Britain over the League of Nations, exclusion of undesirable aliens, and "the introduction of business principles into government". The group was reinforced through by-election victories of other Independents—including Charles Frederick Palmer, John Bull's deputy editor, until his premature death in October 1920.

Bottomley was, at least for a year or so, a diligent parliamentarian who spoke on a range of issues, and from time to time teased the government as when, during the Irish Troubles, he asked whether, "in view of the breakdown of British rule in Ireland, the government will approach America with a view to her accepting the mandate for the government of that country". On other occasions he helped the government, as when in January 1919, he was called upon in his role of "Soldier's Friend" to help pacify troops in Folkestone and Calais who were in a state of mutiny over delays in their demobilisation.

==== Downfall ====
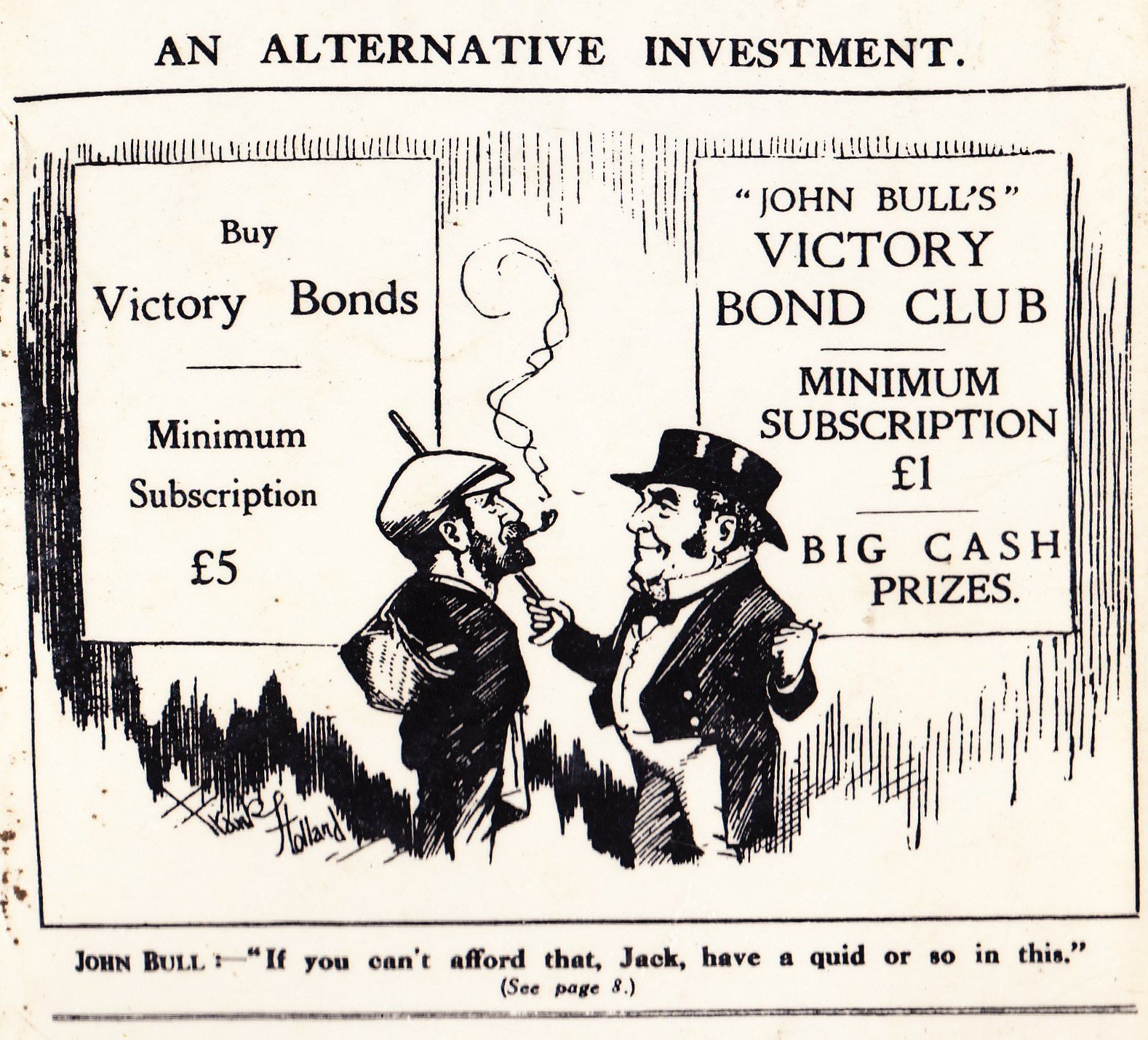
John Bull advertises Bottomley's "Victory Bonds" scheme, 12 July 1919.

In July 1919 Bottomley announced his "Victory Bonds Club", based on the government's latest issue of Victory Bonds. Normally, these bonds cost £5; in Bottomley's club, subscribers bought units for a minimum payment of £1, and participated in an annual draw for prizes—up to £20,000, he said—funded from accrued interest. Contrary to Bottomley's public statements, not all the money subscribed was used to buy bonds. He had ambitions to become a press baron, to rival such as the Lords Rothermere and Beaverbrook.

In October 1919 he used War Bonds funds to buy two obscure newspapers, the National News and the Sunday Evening Telegram. The papers were not financially successful, and in 1921 Bottomley closed the Telegram and changed the name of the National News to Sunday Illustrated. To bolster its fortunes, he transferred his Sunday Pictorial column to the Illustrated, and mounted an expensive promotional campaign, but with little benefit. The paper languished, while Bottomley lost the large income and readership that went with the Pictorial. His fortunes declined further when, in 1920, Odhams revoked the pre-war partnership agreement and took full control of John Bull. Bottomley was made editor for life, but a year later Odhams terminated this arrangement with a final pay-off of £25,000, which ended Bottomley's connection with the paper.

Meanwhile, dogged by poor administration and inadequate accounting, the Victory Bonds Club was sliding into chaos. Public unease grew, and soon hundreds of subscribers were demanding their money back—slipshod record-keeping meant that some were repaid several times over. Bottomley's position worsened when he fell out with Bigland, after refusing to finance his former associate's scheme for turning water into petrol. The two had quarrelled during the war, when Bigland had attacked Bottomley in print. They had later reconciled, but after their second dispute Bigland turned vengeful. In September 1921 he published a leaflet describing the War Bond Club as Bottomley's "latest and greatest swindle". Against the advice of his lawyers, Bottomley sued for criminal libel, and brought other charges against Bigland of blackmail and extortion. The preliminary hearing, at Bow Street Magistrates' Court in October 1921, at which Bottomley's methods were revealed, proved disastrous to his credibility. Nevertheless, Bigland was committed for trial at the Old Bailey on the libel charge, and to Shropshire Assizes on charges of attempted extortion.

The libel trial began on 23 January 1922; to prevent further damaging disclosures in court, Bottomley's lawyers offered no evidence, and Bigland was discharged. The extortion case went ahead in Shrewsbury on 18 February 1922, at the end of which it took the jury only three minutes to find Bigland not guilty. Bottomley, himself now under police investigation, was ordered to pay the costs of the trial. A few days afterwards, he was summoned to appear at Bow Street, on charges of fraudulent conversion of Victory Bond Club funds. After a brief hearing he was committed for trial at the Old Bailey.

=== Final years ===
Bottomley in court, after his sentencing; a depiction by the Illustrated London News

Bottomley's trial began on 19 May 1922, before Mr Justice Salter. As the case was beginning, Bottomley secured the agreement of the prosecuting counsel, Travers Humphreys, to a 15-minute adjournment each day so that he, Bottomley, could drink a pint of champagne, ostensibly for medicinal purposes. He faced 24 fraud charges, involving amounts totalling £170,000. The prosecution produced evidence that he had regularly used Victory Bonds Club funds to finance business ventures, private debts and his expensive lifestyle.

Bottomley, who defended himself, claimed that his legitimate expenses in connection with the club, and repayments made to Victory Bonds Club members, exceeded total receipts by at least £50,000: "I swear I have never made a penny out of it. I swear before God that I have never fraudulently converted a penny of the Club's money". The weight of evidence suggested otherwise; Salter's summing up, described by a biographer as "masterly; lucid and concise, yet complete", went heavily against Bottomley, and the jury required only 28 minutes to convict him on all but one of the charges. He was sentenced to seven years' penal servitude. Humphreys commented later: "It was not I that floored him, but Drink".

After the dismissal of his appeal in July, Bottomley was expelled from the House of Commons. The Leader of the House, Sir Austen Chamberlain, read out a letter in which Bottomley insisted that, however unorthodox his methods, he had not been guilty of conscious fraud; he accepted that his predicament was entirely his own fault. Chamberlain then moved Bottomley's expulsion, which was carried without dissent. One member expressed regret, "remembering the remarkable position which he [had] occupied in the country". Bottomley spent the first year of his sentence in Wormwood Scrubs where he sewed mailbags, (Note: Bottomley's stint sewing mailbags is the source of what Symons terms the best-known of all Bottomley stories. A visitor, variously described as a Home Office inspector, a personal friend, a prison chaplain, etc., observed him at work, and remarked "Ah, Bottomley, sewing?" – to which he replied at once: "No, reaping". Symons believes that "in spite of its apocryphal sound", the story is essentially true, and illustrates Bottomley's wit and resilience.) and the remainder in Maidstone Prison where, although conditions were squalid, he was given lighter work. He was released on 29 July 1927, after serving just over five years, and returned to The Dicker, still his family home, owned at the time of his bankruptcy by his son-in-law, Jefferson Cohn.

Although now 67 years old and in indifferent health, Bottomley tried to resurrect his business career. He raised sufficient capital to start a new magazine, John Blunt, as a rival to John Bull, but the new venture lasted little more than a year before closing, having lost money from the start. In September 1929 he began an overseas lecture tour, which failed utterly, as did an attempt at a British tour during which he was received with indifference or hostility. By 1930 he was again bankrupt; his wife Eliza died that year, after which Bottomley's former son-in-law Jefferson Cohn (who owned it) evicted him from The Dicker. (Note: In 1979 The Dicker was acquired by St Bede's School to house the newly established St Bede's Senior School.) For the remaining years of his life he lived with his long-time mistress, the actress Peggy Primrose, whom Bottomley, in his years of riches, had vainly tried to promote to stardom.

Bottomley's last public venture was an engagement at the Windmill Theatre in September 1932, where he performed a monologue of reminiscences that, according to Symons, puzzled rather than amused his audience. Following a health breakdown, he lived with Primrose in quiet poverty until his final illness.

== Death ==
Bottomley died at the Middlesex Hospital on 26 May 1933 at the age of 73, and his body was cremated at Golders Green Crematorium a few days later. A large crowd heard the Reverend Basil Bourchier express the hope that "no one here today will forget what Mr Bottomley did to revive the spirits of our men at the Front". Four years later, in accordance with Bottomley's wishes, Primrose scattered his ashes on the Sussex Downs.

== Appraisal ==
If [Bottomley] had a humbug of his own, he made mincemeat of the humbug of others, excoriating the more extreme claims made on behalf of the League of Nations, dismissing most forces in international politics except those based on power and ridiculing the naivest sorts of Labour claim to have discovered an inexhaustible supply of wealth and wages.

— Maurice Cowling: The Impact of Labour: 1920–1924

Bottomley's obituaries dwelt on the common theme of wasted talent: a man of brilliant natural abilities, destroyed by greed and vanity. "He had personal magnetism, eloquence, and the power to convince", wrote his Daily Mail obituarist. "He might have been a leader at the Bar, a captain of industry, a great journalist. He might have been almost anything". The Straits Times of Singapore thought that Bottomley could have rivalled Lloyd George as a national leader: "Though he deserved his fate, the news of his passing will awaken the many regrets for the good which he did when he was Bottomley the reformer and crusader and the champion of the bottom dog". A later historian, Maurice Cowling, pays tribute to Bottomley's capacity and industry, and to his forceful campaigns in support of liberty. In his sketch for the Oxford Dictionary of National Biography, Morris delivers a different judgement: "[H]e claimed to serve the interests of others, but sought only his own gratification".

Among Bottomley's principal biographers, Hyman suggests that his financial fecklessness and disregard for consequences may have originated from his deprived background and sudden acquisition of wealth in the 1890s. "Success went to his head and he started spending money like a drunken sailor and could never break the habit." It was a wonder, says Hyman, that he stayed out of prison as long as he did. G. R. Searle speculates that Bottomley was protected from prosecution because of his knowledge of wider scandals in the government, particularly after Lloyd George's coalition assumed power in 1916. Symons acknowledges Bottomley's "wonderfully rich public personality" but suggests that there was no substance behind the presentation: throughout his adult life, Bottomley was "more a series of public attitudes than a person". Matthew Engel, writing in 1999 in The Guardian, notes his ability to charm the public even while swindling them; one victim, cheated of £40,000, apparently insisted: "I am not sorry I lent him the money, and I would do it again". If London had had a mayor in those days, says Engel, Bottomley would have won in a landslide.

== Cultural depictions ==
- Actor Timothy West portrays Bottomley in the 1972–1973 miniseries The Edwardians.
- Actor Patrick Mower portrays Bottomley in a radio play by Allen Saddler about him called Man of the People. It was first broadcast on BBC Radio 4 in 1986 and in June 2022 on BBC Radio 4 Extra.

== Notes and references ==
Notes

Citations

Sources

- Cook, Andrew (2009). Jack the Ripper. Stroud, Gloucestershire: Amberley Publishing. ISBN 978-1-84868-327-3.
- Cowling, Maurice (1971). The Impact of Labour 1920–1924: The Beginning of Modern British Politics. Cambridge: Cambridge University Press. ISBN 0-521-07969-1.
- Halsbury, Earl of (1911). "Courts of Summary Jurisdiction etc.". The Laws of England Vol. XIX. London: Butterworth & Co. OCLC 162532487.
- Harrison, Barbara (1996). Not Only the "dangerous trades": Women's Work and Health in Britain, 1880–1914. Exeter: SRP Ltd. ISBN 0-7484-0145-8.
- Humphreys, Travers (1945). Criminal Days. London: Hodder and Stoughton. OCLC 753231983.
- Hyman, Alan (1972). The Rise and Fall of Horatio Bottomley. Littlehampton, West Sussex: Cassell & Co. ISBN 0-304-29023-8.
- Lentin, Anthony (1985). Lloyd George, Woodrow Wilson and the guilt of Germany : an essay in the pre-history of appeasement. Leicester: Leicester University Press. ISBN 978-0-71851-251-4.
- Messinger, Gary S. (1992). British Propaganda and the State in the First World War. Manchester: Manchester University Press. ISBN 0-7190-3014-5.
- Monger, David (2012). Patriotism and Propaganda in First World War Britain. Liverpool: Liverpool University Press. ISBN 978-1-84631-830-6.
- Parris, Matthew (1996). Great Parliamentary Scandals. London: Robson Books. ISBN 1-86105-061-5.
- Robb, George (1992). White-Collar Crime in Modern England: Financial Fraud and Business Morality. Cambridge: Cambridge University Press. ISBN 0-521-41234-X.
- Rolph, David (2008). Reputation, Celebrity and Defamation Law. Aldershot, Hampshire: Ashgate Publishing Ltd. ISBN 978-0-7546-7124-4.
- Searle, Geoffrey R. (1987). Corruption in British Politics, 1895–1930. Oxford: Clarendon Press. ISBN 0-19-822915-1.
- Searle, Geoffrey R. (2004). A New England? Peace and War 1886–1918. Oxford: Clarendon Press. ISBN 978-0-19-928440-5.
- Symons, Julian (1955). Horatio Bottomley. London: Cresset Press. OCLC 1278478.
- Taylor, A. J. P. (1970). English History 1914–1945. London: Pelican Books. ISBN 0-14-021181-0.
- Taylor, James (2013). Boardroom Scandal: The Criminalization of Company Fraud in Nineteenth-Century Britain. Oxford: Oxford University Press. ISBN 978-0-19-969579-9.
- Wussow, Helen (1998). The Nightmare of History: The Fictions of Virginia Woolf and D.H. Lawrence. Cranbury, NJ: Associated University Presses Inc. ISBN 0-934223-46-7.

Parliament of the United Kingdom
Preceded by Thomas Herbert Robertson	Member of Parliament for Hackney South; 1906–1912	Succeeded by Hector Morison
Preceded by Hector Morison	Member of Parliament for Hackney South; 1918–1922 expelled 1 August 1922 after fraud conviction	Succeeded by Clifford Erskine-Bolst
