= Nixon, New Jersey =

Populated place in Middlesex County, New Jersey, US

- Unincorporated community
- Location in Middlesex County Nixon (New Jersey) Nixon (the United States)
- Coordinates: 40°30′51″N 74°22′03″W
- Country: United States
- State: New Jersey
- County: Middlesex
- Township: Edison
- Elevation: 52 ft (16 m)
- GNIS feature ID: 878807

Nixon is an unincorporated community located within Edison Township in Middlesex County, in the U.S. state of New Jersey. It was named after Lewis Nixon, a manufacturer and community leader. Soon after the outbreak of World War I, Nixon established a massive volatile chemicals processing facility there, known as the Nixon Nitration Works. It was the site of the 1924 Nixon Nitration Works disaster, a massive explosion and resulting fire that killed 20 people and destroyed several square miles around the plant.

== See also ==
- List of neighborhoods in Edison, New Jersey
