= Labour Party (UK) election results (1945–1955) =

This article lists the Labour Party's election results from the 1945 United Kingdom general election until 1955, including by-elections.

All candidates were sponsored, in some cases by the Divisional Labour Party (noted as "Constituency").

== Summary of general election performance ==
Year	Number of candidates	Total votes	Average votes per candidate	% UK vote	Change (percentage points)	Lost deposits	Number of MPs
1945	603	11,967,746	19,847	48.0	+10.0	2	393
1950	617	13,266,176	21,501	46.1	-1.9	0	315
1951	617	13,948,883	22,608	48.8	+2.7	1	295

== Sponsorship of candidates ==
Sponsor	Candidates 45	MPs 45	Candidates 50	MPs 50	Candidates 51	MPs 51
CLP	443	249	441	186	441	173
Co-op	34	23	33	18	38	16
RACS	0	0	3	1	1	1
Trade union	126	121	140	110	137	105

== Election results ==
=== 1945 UK general election ===
Constituency	Candidate	Votes	%	Position	Sponsor
Aberavon	William Cove	31,286	72.5	1	Constituency
Aberdare	George Henry Hall	34,398	84.3	1	Constituency
Aberdeen North	Hector Hughes	26,753	69.7	1	Constituency
Aberdeen South	William McLaine	17,398	42.3	2	Engineers
Aberdeenshire East	J. R. Allen	10,918	45.1	2	Constituency
Abertillery	George Daggar	28,615	86.6	1	Constituency
Abingdon	Dale Hope Parkinson	11,980	31.5	2	Constituency
Accrington	Walter Scott-Elliot	21,102	48.7	1	Constituency
Acton	Joseph Sparks	19,950	56.1	1	Railwaymen
Altrincham and Sale	M. C. Joseph	21,275	44.4	2	Constituency
Anglesey	Cledwyn Hughes	11,529	47.8	2	Constituency
Argyllshire	A. MacNeill Weir	8,889	31.9	2	Constituency
Ashford	Horace Lee	12,575	34.8	2	Constituency
Ashton-under-Lyne	William Jowitt	14,998	56.4	1	Constituency
Aylesbury	Reg Groves	16,445	32.1	2	Constituency
Ayr Burghs	William Ross	21,865	49.2	2	Constituency
Balham and Tooting	Richard Adams	19,782	57.6	1	Constituency
Banbury	Richard Brian Roach	21,951	48.0	2	Constituency
Banff	D. Macpherson	4,524	20.9	3	Constituency
Barking	Somerville Hastings	24,504	70.5	1	Constituency
Barkston Ash	Bert Hazell	24,322	49.9	2	Agricultural Workers
Barnard Castle	Sydney Lavers	12,024	58.3	1	General & Municipal Workers
Barnet	Stephen Taylor	17,764	45.2	1	Constituency
Barnsley	Frank Collindridge	30,614	72.9	1	Miners
Barnstaple	Ivor Arthur Jack Williams	10,237	24.5	3	Constituency
Barrow-in-Furness	Walter Monslow	25,939	65.5	1	Constituency
Basingstoke	Edith Alice Weston	13,763	33.8	2	Constituency
Bassetlaw	Frederick Bellenger	30,382	62.8	1	Constituency
Bath	Dorothy Archibald	18,120	39.2	2	Constituency
Batley and Morley	Hubert Beaumont	22,682	58.1	1	Constituency
Battersea South	Caroline Ganley	19,275	61.5	1	Co-op
Bedford	Thomas Skeffington-Lodge	19,849	41.7	1	Constituency
Bedwellty	Charles Edwards	30,480	82.1	1	Miners
Belper	George Brown	24,319	52.9	1	Transport & General Workers
Bermondsey West	Richard Sargood	8,139	72.2	1	Transport & General Workers
Berwick and Haddington	John Robertson	19,037	54.5	1	Constituency
Berwick-on-Tweed	John Davis	5,782	20.3	3	Constituency
Bethnal Green North East	Daniel Chater	7,696	59.9	1	Co-op
Bethnal Green South West	Percy Holman	6,669	57.4	1	Co-op
Bexley	Jennie Adamson	24,686	56.9	1	Constituency
Birkenhead East	Frank Soskice	14,790	45.5	1	Constituency
Birkenhead West	Percy Collick	15,568	57.3	1	Locomotive Engineers
Birmingham Acock's Green	Henry Usborne	19,951	49.5	1	Constituency
Birmingham Aston	Woodrow Wyatt	15,031	61.9	1	Constituency
Birmingham Deritend	Fred Longden	9,749	65.3	1	Co-op
Birmingham Duddeston	Edith Agnes Wills	10,745	65.0	1	Co-op
Birmingham Edgbaston	George Corbyn Barrow	12,879	32.0	2	Constituency
Birmingham Erdington	Julius Silverman	34,786	60.8	1	Constituency
Birmingham Handsworth	Cyril Bence	13,142	34.3	2	Constituency
Birmingham King's Norton	Raymond Blackburn	32,062	55.2	1	Constituency
Birmingham Ladywood	Victor Yates	13,503	55.9	1	Constituency
Birmingham Moseley	Arthur Leslie Nalder Stephens	21,070	48.8	2	Constituency
Birmingham Sparkbrook	Percy Shurmer	14,065	57.8	1	Constituency
Birmingham West	Charles Simmons	12,639	63.5	1	Constituency
Birmingham Yardley	Wesley Perrins	33,835	60.5	1	General & Municipal Workers
Bishop Auckland	Hugh Dalton	20,100	64.1	1	Constituency
Blackburn	Barbara Castle	35,145	26.0	2	Constituency
Blackburn	John Edwards	35,182	26.0	1	Constituency
Blackpool North	Cadwalader Edward Thomas	13,170	25.4	2	Constituency
Blackpool South	Charles Stanley Hilditch	11,914	24.2	2	Constituency
Blaydon	William Whiteley	29,931	71.7	1	Miners
Bodmin	Jack Hubert Pitts	6,401	18.2	3	Constituency
Bolton	Jack Jones	44,595	24.0	1	Iron and Steel
Bolton	John Lewis	43,266	23.3	1	Constituency
Bootle	John Kinley	15,823	58.6	1	Constituency
Bosworth	Arthur Allen	26,151	55.6	1	Boot and Shoe
Bothwell	John Timmons	25,369	65.8	1	Miners
Bournemouth	Robert Spence Watson Pollard	13,522	21.7	3	Constituency
Bow and Bromley	Charles Key	10,982	84.1	1	Constituency
Bradford Central	Maurice Webb	16,764	57.5	1	Constituency
Bradford East	Frank McLeavy	15,743	45.0	1	Transport & General Workers
Bradford North	Muriel Nichol	20,268	43.6	1	Constituency
Bradford South	Meredith Titterington	24,394	52.5	1	Co-op
Brecon and Radnor	Tudor Watkins	19,725	46.8	1	Constituency
Brentford and Chiswick	Francis Noel-Baker	17,693	57.6	1	Constituency
Bridgwater	Norman Corkhill	5,613	14.3	3	Constituency
Brigg	Tom Williamson	26,771	58.9	1	General & Municipal Workers
Brighton	G. H. Barnard	30,844	19.2	4	Constituency
Brighton	Joseph Taylor Huddart	31,074	19.4	3	Constituency
Bristol Central	Stan Awbery	13,045	63.9	1	Transport & General Workers
Bristol East	Stafford Cripps	27,975	73.5	1	Constituency
Bristol North	Will Coldrick	22,819	57.8	1	Co-op
Bristol South	William Wilkins	24,929	58.8	1	Typographical
Bristol West	William Edward Balmer	25,163	38.0	2	Constituency
Brixton	Marcus Lipton	15,583	63.6	1	Constituency
Bromley	Alexander Bain	19,849	34.1	2	Constituency
Broxtowe	Seymour Cocks	39,545	72.1	1	Constituency
Buckingham	Aidan Crawley	22,302	54.7	1	Constituency
Bucklow	Alexander Haycock	22,497	42.7	2	Constituency
Burnley	Wilfrid Burke	32,122	63.5	1	General & Municipal Workers
Burslem	Albert Davies	20,044	60.5	1	Constituency
Burton	Arthur W. Lyne	18,288	51.1	1	Boot and Shoe
Bury	Sydney Hand	13,902	39.6	2	Transport & General Workers
Bury St Edmunds	Cecily Alicia McCall	9,195	29.8	2	Constituency
Bute and North Ayrshire	John Wheatley	19,209	47.0	2	Constituency
Caerphilly	Ness Edwards	29,158	80.2	1	Miners
Caithness and Sutherland	Robert Ian Aonas MacInnes	5,558	33.4	2	Constituency
Camberwell North	Cecil Manning	7,186	76.6	1	Constituency
Camberwell North West	Freda Corbet	12,251	69.6	1	Constituency
Camborne	Harold Hayman	11,673	35.3	2	Constituency
Cambridge	Arthur Symonds	19,671	50.9	1	Constituency
Cambridgeshire	A. E. Stubbs	18,714	42.3	1	Constituency
Cannock	Jennie Lee	48,849	62.6	1	Constituency
Canterbury	Joseph Denis Milburn Bell	14,115	35.8	2	Constituency
Cardiff Central	George Thomas	16,506	49.1	1	Constituency
Cardiff East	Hilary Marquand	16,299	50.7	1	Constituency
Cardiff South	James Callaghan	17,489	60.2	1	Constituency
Cardiganshire	Iwan James Morgan	10,718	36.2	2	Constituency
Carlisle	Edgar Grierson	18,505	50.4	1	Constituency
Carmarthen	Moelwyn Hughes	18,504	48.3	2	Constituency
Carnarvon Boroughs	Elwyn Jones	10,625	30.6	3	Constituency
Carnarvonshire	Goronwy Roberts	22,043	55.3	1	Constituency
Carshalton	William Hawkins	19,164	43.1	2	Constituency
Central Aberdeenshire	David Sinclair Hay	7,997	26.6	2	Constituency
Chatham	Arthur Bottomley	19,250	55.3	1	Constituency
Chelsea	Margaret Douglas Shufeldt	5,874	31.1	2	Constituency
Cheltenham	Phyllis Maude Warner	11,095	29.9	2	Constituency
Chertsey	Brian Barker	25,194	35.2	2	Constituency
Chesterfield	George Benson	29,459	62.8	1	Constituency
Chester-le-Street	Jack Lawson	33,788	76.8	1	Miners
Chichester	Rosalie Francesca Chamberlayne	13,670	24.1	2	Constituency
Chippenham	Andrew Tomlinson	11,866	31.8	2	Constituency
Chislehurst	George Wallace	25,522	49.5	1	Constituency
Chorley	Clifford Kenyon	24,550	53.2	1	Constituency
Cirencester and Tewkesbury	Alan Ernest Gwynn Hawkins	12,380	30.5	2	Constituency
City of Chester	David Martin Hopkinson	13,585	35.9	2	Constituency
Clackmannan and East Stirlingshire	Arthur Woodburn	24,622	62.9	1	Constituency
Clapham	John Battley	15,205	54.2	1	Constituency
Clay Cross	Harold Neal	27,538	82.1	1	Miners
Cleveland	George Willey	27,660	49.0	1	General & Municipal Workers
Clitheroe	Harry Randall	19,443	53.7	1	Post Office Workers
Coatbridge	Jean Mann	18,619	61.1	1	Constituency
Colchester	Charles Delacourt-Smith	16,587	45.3	1	Constituency
Colne Valley	Glenvil Hall	23,488	54.7	1	Constituency
Combined Scottish Universities	Halliday Sutherland	2,860	08.7	3	University Party
Consett	James Glanville	28,617	70.1	1	Miners
Coventry East	Richard Crossman	34,379	60.5	1	Constituency
Coventry West	Maurice Edelman	38,249	62.2	1	Constituency
Crewe	Scholefield Allen	28,416	60.6	1	Constituency
Croydon North	Marion Billson	22,810	40.1	2	Constituency
Croydon South	David Rees-Williams	27,650	53.4	1	Constituency
Dagenham	John Parker	36,686	83.7	1	Constituency
Darlington	David Hardman	21,442	48.9	1	Constituency
Dartford	Norman Dodds	36,665	68.4	1	Co-op
Darwen	Ronald Haines	11,282	34.3	2	Constituency
Daventry	Paul Williams	13,693	39.5	2	Constituency
Denbigh	William Mars-Jones	11,702	28.7	3	Constituency
Deptford	John Wilmot	22,313	73.5	2	Constituency
Derby	Philip Noel-Baker	42,196	33.6	1	Constituency
Derby	Clifford Wilcock	40,800	32.5	2	Constituency
Devizes	Wilfrid Edward Cave	8,120	29.9	2	Constituency
Dewsbury	William Paling	16,330	56.3	1	Miners
Doncaster	Evelyn Walkden	40,050	70.2	1	Distributive Workers
Don Valley	Thomas Williams	40,153	71.7	1	Miners
Dover	John Thomas	17,373	52.5	1	Constituency
Dudley	George Wigg	15,439	62.8	1	Constituency
Dulwich	Wilfrid Vernon	10,266	43.5	1	Constituency
Dumbarton Burghs	David Kirkwood	16,262	65.2	1	Engineers
Dumfriesshire	David Dunwoodie	12,388	35.7	2	Co-op
Dunbartonshire	Adam McKinlay	28,383	50.7	1	Transport & General Workers
Dundee	Thomas Cook	48,804	28.6	1	Electrical
Dundee	John Strachey	48,393	28.4	2	Constituency
Dunfermline Burghs	William McLean Watson	22,021	64.7	1	Miners
Durham	Charles Grey	24,135	66.2	1	Miners
Ealing East	David John Johnston	18,619	47.8	1	Constituency
Ealing West	James Hindle Hudson	29,115	60.3	1	Co-op
Eastbourne	Duncan Newman Smith	12,637	37.0	2	Constituency
East Dorset	Charles Fletcher-Cooke	25,093	41.4	2	Constituency
East Fife	Samuel McLaren	10,920	30.6	2	Co-op
East Grinstead	David George Packham	12,519	25.3	2	Constituency
East Ham North	Percy Daines	18,373	70.2	1	Co-op
East Ham South	Alfred Barnes	19,168	74.0	1	Co-op
East Norfolk	Norman Reeve Tillett	18,467	44.2	2	Constituency
East Renfrewshire	Daniel McArthur	36,634	46.4	2	Co-op
East Surrey	Henry Edward Weaver	17,708	30.4	2	Constituency
Ebbw Vale	Aneurin Bevan	27,209	80.1	1	Miners
Eccles	William Proctor	23,008	51.1	1	Railwaymen
Eddisbury	John Loverseed	7,392	27.9	2	Constituency
Edinburgh Central	Andrew Gilzean	10,921	54.3	1	Constituency
Edinburgh East	Frederick Pethick-Lawrence	19,300	56.4	1	Constituency
Edinburgh North	George Willis	12,825	45.1	1	Constituency
Edinburgh South	William Earsman	9,767	29.2	2	Constituency
Edinburgh West	Gordon Stott	18,840	44.9	2	Constituency
Edmonton	Evan Durbin	33,163	68.2	1	Constituency
Elland	Frederick Cobb	19,632	50.3	1	Constituency
Enfield	Ernest Davies	32,625	52.1	1	Constituency
Epping	Leah Manning	15,993	44.1	1	Constituency
Epsom	Edward Shackleton	20,533	37.8	2	Constituency
Eton and Slough	Benn Levy	25,711	45.5	1	Constituency
Exeter	Reginald Travess	15,245	40.2	2	Railwaymen
Eye	R. B. Collingson	8,089	26.2	3	Constituency
Fareham	Ashley Bramall	32,501	47.5	2	Constituency
Farnham	Thomas Gittins	20,013	38.8	2	Constituency
Farnworth	George Tomlinson	28,462	66.1	1	Textile Factory Workers
Faversham	Percy Wells	23,502	52.8	1	Transport & General Workers
Finchley	Cyril Lacey	18,611	37.2	2	Constituency
Finsbury	John Platts-Mills	9,786	70.8	1	Constituency
Flintshire	Eirene Lloyd Jones	26,761	37.4	2	Constituency
Forest of Dean	M. Philips Price	19,721	65.2	1	Constituency
Forfarshire	Edward Douglas	8,199	31.1	2	Constituency
Frome	Walter Farthing	29,735	55.1	1	Transport & General Workers
Fulham East	Michael Stewart	15,662	55.4	1	Constituency
Fulham West	Edith Summerskill	19,537	61.9	1	Constituency
Fylde	Edgar Hewitt	22,102	35.8	2	Constituency
Gainsborough	Gerald Samson Saville	9,436	32.8	2	Constituency
Galloway	Robert Hales	11,822	35.3	2	Constituency
Gateshead	Konni Zilliacus	36,736	67.5	1	Constituency
Gillingham	Joseph Binns	15,110	53.3	1	Constituency
Glasgow Cathcart	Nathan Jackson	12,923	41.2	2	Constituency
Glasgow Central	James McInnes	7,849	36.9	2	Constituency
Glasgow Gorbals	George Buchanan	21,073	80.0	1	Patternmakers
Glasgow Govan	Neil Maclean	18,668	66.1	1	Constituency
Glasgow Hillhead	Hugh Turner McCalman	8,545	33.6	2	Constituency
Glasgow Kelvingrove	John Williams	12,273	46.0	1	Constituency
Glasgow Maryhill	William Hannan	23,595	60.1	1	Constituency
Glasgow Partick	George Younger	12,998	48.4	2	Co-op
Glasgow Pollok	Alexander Burns Mackay	10,630	33.6	2	Constituency
Glasgow St Rollox	William Leonard	14,520	62.9	1	Co-op
Glasgow Shettleston	John Stewart Dallas	6,910	20.6	3	Constituency
Glasgow Springburn	John Forman	21,698	65.0	1	Co-op
Glasgow Tradeston	John Rankin	13,153	59.7	1	Co-op
Gloucester	Moss Turner-Samuels	14,010	47.0	1	Constituency
Gower	David Grenfell	30,676	68.5	1	Miners
Grantham	Thomas Sansby Bavin	7,728	16.2	3	Constituency
Gravesend	Garry Allighan	21,609	52.5	1	Constituency
Great Yarmouth	Ernest Kinghorn	10,079	55.8	1	Constituency
Greenock	Hector McNeil	16,186	47.1	1	Constituency
Greenwich	Joseph Reeves	22,078	65.6	1	Constituency
Grimsby	Kenneth Younger	28,484	60.1	1	Constituency
Guildford	Vernon George Wilkinson	21,789	32.9	2	Constituency
Hackney Central	Henry Hynd	14,810	67.2	1	Railway Clerks
Hackney North	Henry Edwin Goodrich	17,337	65.0	1	Constituency
Hackney South	Herbert Butler	10,432	51.6	1	Constituency
Halifax	Dryden Brook	25,605	46.5	1	Constituency
Hamilton	Tom Fraser	20,015	73.5	1	Miners
Hammersmith North	William Henry Church	3,165	10.7	3	Constituency
Hammersmith South	William Thomas Adams	12,502	58.0	1	Co-op
Hampstead	Bill Field	18,294	48.2	2	Constituency
Hanley	Barnett Stross	21,915	68.0	1	Constituency
Harborough	Humphrey Attewell	23,353	42.5	1	Boot and Shoe
Harrow East	Frederick Skinnard	27,613	46.4	1	Constituency
Harrow West	Joan Thompson	18,961	33.0	2	Constituency
The Hartlepools	D. T. Jones	16,502	41.2	1	Railwaymen
Harwich	Joseph Hewitt	13,067	44.3	2	Constituency
Hastings	Lewis Gassman	10,580	38.8	2	Constituency
Hemel Hempstead	Doris Mobbs	14,426	32.6	2	Constituency
Hemsworth	George Griffiths	33,984	81.4	1	Miners
Hendon North	Barbara Gould	18,251	47.6	1	Constituency
Hendon South	Elaine Burton	14,917	38.1	2	Constituency
Henley	James Stewart Cook	19,457	37.1	2	Constituency
Hereford	William Pigott	8,359	24.8	2	Constituency
Hertford	Lynton Scutts	17,349	37.9	2	Constituency
Heston and Isleworth	William Williams	29,192	54.3	1	Post Office Workers
Hexham	Ernest Kavanagh	11,786	41.8	2	Constituency
Heywood and Radcliffe	John Edmondson Whittaker	22,601	51.0	1	Constituency
High Peak	Wilfred McCormack Halsall	15,454	38.8	2	Constituency
Hitchin	Philip Asterley Jones	20,779	42.6	1	Constituency
Holborn	Irene Marcousé	5,136	45.9	2	Constituency
Holderness	Frederick Lawson	23,036	39.5	2	Constituency
Holland with Boston	Arthur Monks	21,263	44.1	2	Agricultural Workers
Honiton	Henry Thomas Langdon	12,739	34.2	2	Constituency
Horncastle	George Holderness	7,055	26.7	2	Constituency
Hornchurch	Geoffrey Bing	26,856	56.0	1	Constituency
Hornsey	Bill Fiske	12,015	25.7	2	Constituency
Horsham	Augustus Lindner	11,664	29.4	2	Constituency
Houghton-le-Spring	Billy Blyton	43,730	66.7	1	Miners
Howdenshire	Tom Neville	11,161	29.2	2	Co-op
Huddersfield	Joseph Mallalieu	33,362	48.3	1	Constituency
Hull Central	Mark Hewitson	8,786	58.8	1	General & Municipal Workers
Hull East	Harry Pursey	19,443	64.3	1	Constituency
Hull North West	Kim Mackay	13,944	48.7	1	Constituency
Hull South West	Sydney Smith	18,606	59.0	1	Constituency
Huntingdonshire	W. A. Waters	9,458	30.8	2	Constituency
Hythe	David Widdicombe	6,091	35.2	2	Constituency
Ilford North	Mabel Ridealgh	18,833	42.8	1	Co-op
Ilford South	James Ranger	19,339	48.0	1	Constituency
Ilkeston	George Oliver	26,536	66.8	1	Transport & General Workers
Ince	Tom Brown	28,702	74.4	1	Miners
Inverness	Neil George Maclean	9,655	34.6	2	Constituency
Ipswich	Richard Stokes	26,296	49.3	1	Constituency
Isle of Ely	Alfred Francis Colenso Gray	13,271	34.5	2	Constituency
Isle of Thanet	Christopher Boyd	12,075	39.2	2	Constituency
Isle of Wight	William Miller	19,252	40.7	2	Constituency
Islington East	Eric Fletcher	18,936	65.5	1	Constituency
Islington North	Leslie Haden-Guest	23,234	67.4	1	Constituency
Islington South	William Cluse	12,893	72.5	1	Compositors
Islington West	Frederick Montague	11,496	73.8	1	Constituency
Jarrow	Ellen Wilkinson	22,656	66.0	1	Distributive Workers
Keighley	Ivor Thomas	22,222	52.7	1	Constituency
Kennington	Charles Gibson	12,910	70.2	1	Transport & General Workers
Kensington North	George Rogers	16,838	56.6	1	Railway Clerks
Kensington South	Patricia Strauss	6,014	18.9	2	Constituency
Kettering	Dick Mitchison	29,868	53.6	1	Constituency
Kidderminster	Louis Tolley	34,421	55.8	1	Constituency
Kilmarnock	Clarice Shaw	23,837	59.4	1	Constituency
King's Lynn	Frederick Wise	18,202	48.7	1	Constituency
Kingston-upon-Thames	George Elvin	28,516	43.5	2	Constituency
Kingswinford	Arthur Henderson	34,307	69.2	1	Constituency
Kinross and Western Perthshire	Campbell McKinnon	7,782	32.0	2	Constituency
Kirkcaldy Burghs	Thomas Hubbard	15,401	45.0	1	Miners
Knutsford	Frederick Lockwood Tyler	14,416	24.5	2	Constituency
Lambeth North	George Strauss	8,677	66.6	1	Constituency
Lanark	Tom Steele	17,784	52.8	1	Constituency
Lancaster	Albert Edward Victor Ainsworth Farrer	19,367	35.3	2	Constituency
Leeds Central	George Porter	13,370	57.1	1	Woodworkers
Leeds North	Ronald Hodgson	22,720	41.8	2	Constituency
Leeds North East	Alice Bacon	28,870	53.1	1	Constituency
Leeds South	Hugh Gaitskell	17,899	61.0	1	Constituency
Leeds South East	James Milner	20,363	71.8	1	Constituency
Leeds West	Thomas Stamford	26,593	59.0	1	Constituency
Leek	Harold Davies	32,567	67.2	1	Constituency
Leicester East	Terence Donovan	28,414	56.9	1	Constituency
Leicester South	Herbert Bowden	19,541	45.0	1	Constituency
Leicester West	Barnett Janner	20,563	53.3	1	Constituency
Leigh	Harold Boardman	32,447	69.8	1	Distributive Workers
Leith	James Hoy	19,571	60.8	1	Constituency
Lewes	Albert Oram	18,511	36.3	2	Co-op
Lewisham East	Herbert Morrison	37,361	61.8	1	Constituency
Lewisham West	Arthur Skeffington	20,008	53.4	1	Constituency
Leyton East	Albert Bechervaise	13,048	65.7	1	Constituency
Leyton West	Reginald Sorensen	17,236	58.5	1	Constituency
Lichfield	Cecil Poole	42,806	55.2	1	Constituency
Limehouse	Clement Attlee	8,398	83.8	1	Constituency
Lincoln	George Deer	14,052	41.3	1	Transport & General Workers
Linlithgowshire	George Mathers	24,762	64.1	1	Railway Clerks
Liverpool East Toxteth	Victor Edgar Harold Baker	12,376	33.6	2	Constituency
Liverpool Edge Hill	Richard Clitherow	13,150	64.9	1	Constituency
Liverpool Everton	Bertie Kirby	9,088	65.4	1	Clerks
Liverpool Exchange	Bessie Braddock	8,494	52.0	1	Woodworkers
Liverpool Fairfield	Arthur Moody	14,475	45.7	1	Constituency
Liverpool Kirkdale	William Keenan	10,640	54.1	1	Transport & General Workers
Liverpool Scotland	David Logan	unopposed	N/A	1	Constituency
Liverpool Walton	James Haworth	18,385	43.6	1	Railway Clerks
Liverpool Wavertree	Derek Maurice Van Abbé	20,249	38.4	2	Constituency
Liverpool West Derby	Dick Lewis	18,370	45.7	2	Co-op
Liverpool West Toxteth	Joseph Gibbins	14,780	59.7	1	General & Municipal Workers
Llandaff and Barry	Lynn Ungoed-Thomas	33,706	47.5	1	Constituency
Llanelly	Jim Griffiths	44,514	81.1	1	Miners
Lonsdale	Sidney Wright Grundy	13,436	42.0	2	Constituency
Loughborough	Mont Follick	21,152	53.3	1	Constituency
Louth	Jack Franklin	11,628	32.9	2	Constituency
Lowestoft	Edward Evans	12,759	42.1	1	Constituency
Ludlow	Aneurin Glanmor Parry-Jones	6,358	24.8	2	Constituency
Luton	Will Warbey	39,335	55.2	1	Constituency
Macclesfield	Harold Fraser Urquhart	20,442	39.6	2	Constituency
Maidstone	Otto Leslie Shaw	18,295	45.7	2	Constituency
Maldon	Tom Driberg	22,480	60.4	1	Constituency
Manchester Ardwick	Joseph Henderson	14,360	64.0	1	Railwaymen
Manchester Blackley	John Diamond	19,561	44.7	1	Constituency
Manchester Clayton	Harry Thorneycroft	22,401	69.4	1	Constituency
Manchester Exchange	Harold Lever	11,067	55.0	1	Constituency
Manchester Gorton	William Oldfield	24,095	69.1	1	Transport & General Workers
Manchester Hulme	Frederick Lee	12,034	55.6	1	Engineers
Manchester Moss Side	William Griffiths	10,201	49.5	1	Constituency
Manchester Platting	Hugh Delargy	16,427	63.9	1	Constituency
Manchester Rusholme	Lester Hutchinson	15,408	43.4	1	Constituency
Manchester Withington	R. Edwards	22,634	34.0	2	Constituency
Mansfield	Bernard Taylor	43,113	75.1	1	Miners
Melton	Archibald Crawford	18,379	35.6	2	Constituency
Merioneth	Huw Morris Jones	8,383	35.4	2	Constituency
Merthyr	S. O. Davies	24,879	81.4	1	Miners
Mid Bedfordshire	William Howell	12,073	32.1	2	Constituency
Middlesbrough East	Alfred Edwards	17,427	65.1	1	Constituency
Middlesbrough West	Geoffrey Cooper	20,071	53.5	1	Constituency
Middleton and Prestwich	Mabel Tylecote	25,908	49.2	2	Constituency
Midlothian and Peebles Northern	James Lean	23,657	45.7	2	Constituency
Mile End	Daniel Frankel	3,861	36.2	2	Constituency
Mitcham	Tom Braddock	26,910	57.7	1	Constituency
Monmouth	Archibald Benjamin Lloyd Oakley	20,543	48.1	2	Constituency
Montrose Burghs	Thomas Alexander MacNair	10,011	41.8	2	Constituency
Moray and Nairn	Sinclair Shaw	7,993	38.4	2	Constituency
Morpeth	Robert Taylor	38,521	73.2	1	Miners
Mossley	George Woods	27,435	47.5	1	Co-op
Motherwell	Alexander Anderson	15,831	52.7	1	Constituency
Neath	D. J. Williams	37,957	75.8	1	Miners
Nelson and Colne	Sydney Silverman	25,610	59.4	1	Constituency
Newark	Hugh Champion de Crespigny	17,448	42.4	2	Constituency
Newbury	Iris Brook	15,754	33.7	2	Constituency
Newcastle-under-Lyme	John Mack	25,903	66.2	1	Life Assurance Workers
Newcastle-upon-Tyne Central	Lyall Wilkes	10,627	61.9	1	Constituency
Newcastle-upon-Tyne East	Arthur Blenkinsop	26,116	68.9	1	Constituency
Newcastle-upon-Tyne North	W. Henry Shackleton	10,228	29.8	2	Co-op
Newcastle upon Tyne West	Ernest Popplewell	28,149	58.5	1	Railwaymen
New Forest and Christchurch	Horace King	22,478	35.9	2	Constituency
Newport	Peter Freeman	23,845	54.2	1	Constituency
Newton	Robert Young	25,197	62.0	1	Engineers
Normanton	Tom Smith	28,238	84.3	1	Miners
Northampton	Reginald Paget	27,681	56.4	1	Constituency
North East Derbyshire	Henry White	35,795	65.6	1	Miners
North Lanarkshire	Margaret Herbison	30,251	59.6	1	Constituency
North Norfolk	Edwin Gooch	17,753	58.7	1	Agricultural Workers
Northwich	Robert Chorley	20,183	41.3	2	Constituency
Norwich	Lucy Noel-Buxton	31,553	27.9	1	Constituency
Norwich	John Paton	31,229	27.7	2	Constituency
Norwood	Ronald Chamberlain	16,667	47.3	1	Constituency
Nottingham Central	Geoffrey de Freitas	13,681	48.4	1	Constituency
Nottingham East	James Harrison	12,075	40.2	1	Constituency
Nottingham South	Norman Smith	15,316	50.5	1	Co-op
Nottingham West	Tom O'Brien	24,887	59.6	1	Constituency
Nuneaton	Frank Bowles	30,587	58.5	1	Constituency
Ogmore	Ted Williams	32,715	76.4	1	Miners
Oldham	Frank Fairhurst	31,704	23.9	1	Textile Factory Workers
Oldham	Leslie Hale	31,327	23.6	2	Constituency
Orkney and Shetland	Prophet Smith	5,208	29.8	3	Constituency
Ormskirk	Harold Wilson	30,126	46.3	1	Constituency
Orpington	Alan Raymond Mais	15,846	37.8	2	Constituency
Oswestry	Gilbert Boyd-Carpenter	10,777	30.9	2	Constituency
Oxford	Frank Pakenham	11,451	36.2	2	Constituency
Oxford University	G. D. H. Cole	3,414	22.3	3	University Party
Paddington North	Noel Mason-Macfarlane	16,638	61.2	1	Constituency
Paddington South	Charles Wegg-Prosser	9,601	42.2	2	Constituency
Paisley	Oliver Baldwin	25,156	55.6	1	Constituency
Peckham	Lewis Silkin	12,935	68.7	1	Constituency
Peebles and Southern Midlothian	David Pryde	15,546	55.7	1	Miners
Pembrokeshire	Wilfred Fienburgh	22,829	49.8	2	Constituency
Penistone	Henry McGhee	40,180	65.8	1	Constituency
Penrith and Cockermouth	Leonard Foster Browne	6,350	26.1	3	Constituency
Penryn and Falmouth	Evelyn King	17,962	43.8	1	Constituency
Perth	William Hughes	11,617	32.6	2	Constituency
Peterborough	Stanley Tiffany	22,056	50.7	1	Co-op
Plaistow	Elwyn Jones	17,351	87.6	1	Constituency
Plymouth Devonport	Michael Foot	13,395	54.1	1	Constituency
Plymouth Drake	Hubert Medland	15,070	50.9	1	Constituency
Plymouth Sutton	Lucy Middleton	15,417	51.6	1	Constituency
Pontefract	Percy Barstow	24,690	60.6	1	Railwaymen
Pontypool	Arthur Jenkins	27,455	77.3	1	Miners
Pontypridd	Arthur Pearson	27,823	68.6	1	Constituency
Poplar South	William Henry Guy	11,620	89.2	1	Transport & General Workers
Portsmouth Central	Julian Snow	14,745	55.3	1	Constituency
Portsmouth North	Donald Bruce	15,352	51.1	1	Constituency
Portsmouth South	Jack Blitz	12,783	44.7	2	Constituency
Preston	Samuel Segal	33,053	24.2	1	Constituency
Preston	John William Sunderland	32,889	24.1	2	Textile Factory Workers
Pudsey and Otley	Denis Healey	21,104	40.2	2	Constituency
Putney	Percy Stewart	12,469	37.0	2	Constituency
Reading	Ian Mikardo	30,465	48.8	1	Constituency
Reigate	Charles Garnsworthy	20,623	42.9	2	Constituency
Rhondda East	William Mainwaring	16,733	48.4	1	Miners
Rhondda West	Iorwerth Thomas	unopposed	N/A	1	Miners
Richmond, Surrey	David Stark Murray	15,760	34.5	2	Constituency
Richmond, Yorkshire	George Henry Metcalfe	6,104	17.6	3	Constituency
Ripon	R. Hartley	12,599	26.0	2	Constituency
Rochdale	Hyacinth Morgan	22,047	44.9	1	Constituency
Romford	Thomas Macpherson	16,979	52.8	1	Constituency
Ross and Cromarty	Angus Mackay Mackintosh	5,959	37.2	2	Constituency
Rossendale	George Henry Walker	15,741	43.6	1	Typographical
Rother Valley	David Griffiths	44,449	75.2	1	Miners
Rotherham	James Harrison	35,654	74.2	1	Railwaymen
Rotherhithe	Ben Smith	9,741	79.1	1	Transport & General Workers
Rothwell	Thomas Brooks	43,829	74.0	1	Constituency
Roxburgh and Selkirk	L. P. Thomas	10,107	28.9	3	Constituency
Royton	Hervey Rhodes	13,753	37.4	2	Constituency
Rugby	Ronald Lewis	10,470	22.7	3	Constituency
Rushcliffe	Florence Paton	43,303	54.2	1	Constituency
Rutherglen	Gilbert McAllister	24,738	59.7	1	Constituency
Rutland and Stamford	Arnold William Gray	13,223	46.3	2	Constituency
Rye	Bernard Simmons	7,414	22.0	2	Constituency
Saffron Walden	Sidney Stanley Wilson	15,792	43.7	2	Constituency
St Albans	Cyril Dumpleton	22,421	46.5	1	Constituency
St Helens	Hartley Shawcross	34,675	66.2	1	Constituency
St Ives	Henry Brinton	8,190	27.2	2	Constituency
St Marylebone	Elizabeth Jacobs	10,740	32.4	2	Constituency
St Pancras North	George House	16,738	63.8	1	Constituency
St Pancras South East	Santo Jeger	10,030	59.6	1	Constituency
St Pancras South West	Haydn Davies	9,533	61.9	1	Constituency
Salford North	William McAdam	18,327	60.5	1	Railwaymen
Salford South	Edward Arthur Hardy	13,941	60.4	1	Constituency
Salford West	Charles Royle	17,010	50.7	1	Constituency
Salisbury	John Alan Lyde Caunter	12,344	32.4	2	Constituency
Scarborough and Whitby	Douglas Curry	9,289	22.8	3	Constituency
Seaham	Manny Shinwell	42,942	80.1	1	Constituency
Sedgefield	John Leslie	27,051	63.8	1	Shop Assistants
Sevenoaks	John Pudney	14,947	36.1	2	Constituency
Sheffield Attercliffe	John Hynd	23,468	81.4	1	Railwaymen
Sheffield Brightside	Fred Marshall	19,373	61.2	1	General & Municipal Workers
Sheffield Central	Harry Morris	7,954	59.2	1	Constituency
Sheffield Hallam	John Frederick Drabble	13,009	38.5	2	Constituency
Sheffield Hillsborough	A. V. Alexander	24,959	63.4	1	Co-op
Sheffield Park	Thomas Burden	29,424	64.9	1	Constituency
Shipley	Arthur Creech Jones	25,027	50.1	1	Transport & General Workers
Shoreditch	Ernest Thurtle	11,592	74.0	1	Constituency
Shrewsbury	Stanley Chapman	10,580	31.0	2	Constituency
Silvertown	Louis Comyns	9,358	91.3	1	Constituency
Skipton	John Davies	15,704	36.4	2	Constituency
Smethwick	Alfred Dobbs	20,522	65.9	1	Boot and Shoe
Solihull	Roy Jenkins	21,647	44.8	2	Constituency
Southall	Walter Ayles	37,404	64.1	1	Constituency
Southampton	Tommy Lewis	37,054	28.4	2	Constituency
Southampton	Ralph Morley	37,556	28.8	1	Constituency
South Ayrshire	Alexander Sloan	21,235	61.3	1	Miners
South Derbyshire	Arthur Champion	47,586	57.7	1	Railwaymen
South Dorset	Philip Sidney Eastman	12,460	36.4	2	Constituency
South East Essex	Ray Gunter	25,581	53.8	1	Railway Clerks
Southend-on-Sea	Gordon Sandison	20,635	38.9	2	Constituency
South Molton	Charles Lang	9,140	32.4	2	Constituency
South Norfolk	Christopher Mayhew	16,825	50.3	1	Constituency
Southport	William Hamling	13,596	26.8	2	Constituency
South Shields	Chuter Ede	22,410	59.4	1	Constituency
Southwark Central	John Hanbury Martin	9,336	71.9	1	Constituency
Southwark North	George Isaacs	5,943	69.0	1	Printers
Southwark South East	Thomas Naylor	9,599	76.9	1	Compositors
South West Norfolk	Sidney Dye	15,091	50.1	1	Constituency
Sowerby	John Belcher	17,710	50.8	1	Railway Clerks
Spelthorne	George Pargiter	28,064	52.0	1	Constituency
Spennymoor	James Murray	22,587	69.9	1	Miners
Spen Valley	Granville Maynard Sharp	25,698	56.7	1	Constituency
Stafford	Stephen Swingler	17,293	51.2	1	Constituency
Stalybridge and Hyde	Gordon Lang	20,597	44.7	1	Constituency
Stirling and Falkirk	Joseph Westwood	18,326	56.1	1	Constituency
Stockport	Roland Casasola	28,798	19.6	4	Constituency
Stockport	Reginald Stamp	29,674	19.6	3	Constituency
Stockton on Tees	George Chetwynd	27,128	55.1	1	Constituency
Stoke Newington	David Weitzman	9,356	51.5	1	Constituency
Stoke	Ellis Smith	29,551	69.1	1	Patternmakers
Stone	William Simcock	18,173	38.4	2	Constituency
Stourbridge	Arthur Moyle	34,912	48.5	1	Constituency
Stratford	Henry Nicholls	11,484	74.6	1	Constituency
Streatham	John Gross	11,296	33.8	2	Constituency
Stretford	Herschel Austin	36,715	54.8	1	Constituency
Stroud	Ben Parkin	22,495	40.8	1	Constituency
Sudbury	Roland Hamilton	9,906	40.3	1	Constituency
Sunderland	Richard Ewart	36,711	26.6	2	Constituency
Sunderland	Fred Willey	38,769	28.1	1	General & Municipal Workers
Sutton and Cheam	Helen Judd	17,293	41.0	2	Constituency
Sutton Coldfield	Fred Mulley	18,261	37.6	2	Constituency
Swansea East	David Mort	19,127	75.8	1	Iron and Steel
Swansea West	Percy Morris	18,098	58.0	1	Railway Clerks
Swindon	Thomas Reid	27,545	62.3	1	Constituency
Taunton	Victor Collins	19,976	52.8	1	Constituency
Tavistock	James Finnigan	8,539	20.3	3	Constituency
Thornbury	Joseph Alpass	28,364	49.3	1	Constituency
Thurrock	Leslie Solley	23,171	70.1	1	Constituency
Tiverton	G. C. Tompson	8,634	26.2	2	Constituency
Tonbridge	Vera Dart	16,590	35.9	2	Constituency
Torquay	George Cornes	13,590	26.1	2	Constituency
Totnes	John Warde	16,098	33.4	2	Constituency
Tottenham North	Robert Morrison	25,360	71.8	1	Co-op
Tottenham South	Frederick Messer	18,335	73.3	1	Constituency
Twickenham	Arthur Irvine	22,736	41.9	2	Constituency
Tynemouth	Grace Colman	13,963	46.1	1	Constituency
Upton	Arthur Lewis	14,281	74.5	1	Constituency
Uxbridge	Frank Beswick	25,190	43.7	1	Co-op
Wakefield	Arthur Greenwood	14,378	54.8	1	Constituency
Wallasey	Thomas Findley	9,879	23.0	3	Co-op
Wallsend	John McKay	32,065	60.1	1	Miners
Walsall	William Wells	28,324	53.9	1	Constituency
Walthamstow East	Harry Wallace	15,650	51.1	1	Post Office Workers
Walthamstow West	Valentine McEntee	17,460	65.2	1	Woodworkers
Wandsworth Central	Ernest Bevin	14,126	61.2	1	Transport & General Workers
Wansbeck	Alfred Robens	40,948	60.0	1	Distributive Workers
Warrington	Edward Porter	22,265	62.9	1	General & Municipal Workers
Warwick and Leamington	Donald Chesworth	19,476	32.2	2	Constituency
Waterloo	Philip Vos	13,795	33.3	2	Constituency
Watford	John Freeman	32,138	46.0	1	Constituency
Wednesbury	Stanley Evans	29,909	68.2	1	Constituency
Wellingborough	George Lindgren	22,416	57.7	1	Railway Clerks
Wells	Cyril Morgan	10,539	33.5	2	Constituency
Wembley North	Charles Hobson	15,677	43.6	1	Constituency
Wembley South	Clarence Barton	16,928	47.8	1	Constituency
Wentworth	Wilfred Paling	44,080	83.6	1	Miners
West Bromwich	John Dugdale	27,979	69.9	1	Constituency
Westbury	George Ward	13,397	36.5	2	Constituency
West Derbyshire	Charles Frederick White	18,331	48.8	1	Constituency
West Dorset	Cambreth John Kane	8,215	30.8	2	Constituency
Western Isles	Malcolm Macmillan	5,914	45.7	1	Constituency
West Fife	Willie Hamilton	15,580	37.3	2	Constituency
Westhoughton	Rhys Davies	20,990	64.9	1	Distributive Workers
Westminster Abbey	Jeremy Hutchinson	4,408	26.1	2	Constituency
Westmorland	Harold Banning Richardson	9,674	26.1	2	Constituency
Weston-super-Mare	Hugh Bruce Oliphant Carew	20,542	33.1	2	Constituency
West Renfrewshire	Thomas Scollan	15,050	48.9	1	Distributive Workers
West Stirlingshire	Alfred Balfour	16,066	54.4	1	Railwaymen
Whitechapel	Stoker Edwards	10,460	83.4	1	Transport & General Workers
Whitehaven	Frank Anderson	18,568	61.1	1	Railway Clerks
Widnes	Christopher Shawcross	41,980	58.8	1	Constituency
Wigan	William Foster	31,392	68.2	1	Miners
Willesden East	Maurice Orbach	23,457	53.0	1	Constituency
Willesden West	Samuel Viant	26,566	72.2	1	Woodworkers
Wimbledon	Arthur Palmer	30,188	44.4	1	Constituency
Winchester	George Jeger	30,290	52.6	1	Constituency
Windsor	Marjorie Nicholson	16,420	33.1	2	Constituency
Wirral	Agnes Bulley	25,919	31.3	2	Constituency
Wolverhampton Bilston	Will Nally	31,493	67.0	1	Co-op
Wolverhampton East	John Baird	17,763	47.7	1	Constituency
Wolverhampton West	Billy Hughes	21,186	59.9	1	Constituency
Woodbridge	John Stewart	11,380	33.3	2	Constituency
Wood Green	Walter Armstrong Vant	23,544	34.7	2	Co-op
Woolwich East	George Hicks	18,983	70.4	1	Builders
Woolwich West	Henry Berry	23,655	61.6	1	Constituency
Worcester	John Evans	13,519	42.9	2	Co-op
Workington	Fred Peart	24,876	72.5	1	Constituency
Worthing	Arthur Wellesley Wright	11,570	23.4	2	Constituency
The Wrekin	Ivor Owen Thomas	22,453	56.3	1	Railwaymen
Wrexham	Robert Richards	26,854	56.0	1	Constituency
Wycombe	John Haire	20,482	45.2	1	Constituency
Yeovil	Malcolm MacPherson	16,641	37.4	2	Constituency
York	John Corlett	22,021	49.9	1	Constituency

=== By-elections, 1945-1950 ===
By-election	Candidate	Votes	%	Position	Sponsor
1945 Smethwick by-election	Patrick Gordon Walker	19,364	68.8	1	Constituency
1945 Ashton-under-Lyne by-election	Hervey Rhodes	12,889	54.1	1	Constituency
1945 Edinburgh East by-election	George Thomson	15,482	61.6	1	
1945 Monmouth by-election	Archibald Benjamin Lloyd Oakley	18,953	47.3	2	Constituency
1945 Bromley by-election	Alexander Bain	20,810	39.1	2	Constituency
1945 Bournemouth by-election	Edward Shackleton	16,526	33.7	2	
1945 Tottenham North by-election	William Irving	12,937	63.6	1	Co-op
1946 Preston by-election	Edward Shackleton	32,189	55.6	1	Constituency
1946 South Ayrshire by-election	Emrys Hughes	20,434	60.4	1	Constituency
1946 Glasgow Cathcart by-election	Alexander Burns Mackay	9,689	37.2	2	
1946 Heywood and Radcliffe by-election	Tony Greenwood	22,238	50.5	1	Constituency
1946 Hemsworth by-election	Horace Holmes	unopposed	N/A	1	Miners
1946 Ogmore by-election	John Evans	13,632	70.6	1	Miners
1946 Bexley by-election	Ashley Bramall	19,759	52.5	1	Constituency
1946 Pontypool by-election	Granville West	23,359	74.1	1	Constituency
1946 Battersea North by-election	Francis Douglas	14,070	73.9	1	Constituency
1946 Glasgow Bridgeton by-election	John Wheatley	5,180	28.0	2	
1946 Rotherhithe by-election	Bob Mellish	7,265	65.0	1	Constituency
1946 Paddington North by-election	William J. Field	13,082	55.6	1	Constituency
1946 Aberdeen South by-election	Arthur Irvine	17,911	45.2	2	
1946 Combined Scottish Universities by-election	C. E. M. Joad	3,731	11.5	2	
1946 Aberdare by-election	David Thomas	24,215	68.3	1	Miners
1946 Kilmarnock by-election	Willie Ross	22,456	59.7	1	Constituency
1947 Normanton by-election	George Sylvester	19,085	79.8	1	Miners
1947 Jarrow by-election	Ernest Fernyhough	20,694	59.3	1	Shop Workers
1947 Liverpool Edge Hill by-election	Arthur Irvine	10,827	52.1	1	Constituency
1947 Islington West by-election	Albert Evans	8,760	57.2	1	Constituency
1947 Gravesend by-election	Richard Acland	24,692	51.8	1	Constituency
1947 Edinburgh East by-election	John Wheatley	16,906	50.5	1	Constituency
1947 Howdenshire by-election	Tom Neville	9,298	25.5	2	Constituency
1947 Epsom by-election	Reginald Bishop	17,339	31.5	2	
1948 Glasgow Camlachie by-election	John Inglis	10,690	42.1	2	Railwaymen
1948 Paisley by-election	Douglas Johnston	27,213	56.8	1	Constituency
1948 Wigan by-election	Ronald Williams	28,941	59.1	1	Miners
1948 Croydon North by-election	Harold Nicolson	24,536	36.6	2	
1948 Brigg by-election	Lance Mallalieu	27,333	54.6	1	Constituency
1948 Southwark Central by-election	Roy Jenkins	8,744	65.4	1	Constituency
1948 Glasgow Gorbals by-election	Alice Cullen	13,706	54.6	1	Constituency
1948 Stirling and Falkirk by-election	Malcolm MacPherson	17,001	49.1	1	Constituency
1948 Edmonton by-election	Austen Albu	26,164	53.4	1	Engineers
1948 Glasgow Hillhead by-election	Thomas Alexander MacNair	7,419	31.6	2	
1949 Batley and Morley by-election	Alfred Broughton	24,514	59.3	1	Constituency
1949 Hammersmith South by-election	Thomas Williams	15,223	52.8	1	Co-op
1949 St Pancras North by-election	Kenneth Robinson	16,185	57.5	1	Constituency
1949 Sowerby by-election	Douglas Houghton	18,606	53.0	1	Constituency
1949 Leeds West by-election	Charles Pannell	21,935	55.2	1	Engineers
1949 Bradford South by-election	George Craddock	23,335	51.3	1	Shop Workers

=== 1950 UK general election ===
Constituency	Candidate	Votes	%	Position	Sponsor
Aberavon	William Cove	29,278	68.7	1	Constituency
Aberdare	David Thomas	33,390	75.6	1	Mineworkers
Aberdeen North	Hector Hughes	31,594	60.5	1	Constituency
Aberdeen South	Olive Crutchley	17,302	35.5	2	Constituency
Abertillery	George Daggar	29,609	87.1	1	Constituency
Abingdon	Robert McCullagh	16,733	37.7	2	Constituency
Accrington	Henry Hynd	23,295	48.8	1	Railway Clerks
Acton	Joseph Sparks	21,751	49.1	1	Railwaymen
Aldershot	Norman Hidden	15,066	37.0	2	Constituency
Altrincham and Sale	Frank Bibby	16,544	30.8	2	Constituency
Anglesey	Cledwyn Hughes	11,759	40.0	2	Constituency
Argyll	Ian Nicholson	9,215	31.8	2	Constituency
Arundel and Shoreham	T. Parsons	15,220	28.8	2	Transport & General Workers
Ashford	Neville Sandelson	14,948	36.6	2	Constituency
Ashton-under-Lyne	Hervey Rhodes	25,991	52.8	1	Constituency
Aylesbury	Hugh Gray	14,549	30.8	2	Constituency
Ayr	John Pollock	14,880	41.4	2	Constituency
Banbury	Cyril Fenton	19,408	39.5	2	Co-op
Banffshire	J. Brown	6,303	26.3	2	Constituency
Barking	Somerville Hastings	30,299	66.3	1	Constituency
Barkston Ash	Bert Hazell	18,626	42.5	2	Agricultural Workers
Barnet	Stephen Taylor	22,419	36.3	2	Constituency
Barnsley	Frank Collindridge	42,008	68.6	1	Mineworkers
Barrow-in-Furness	Walter Monslow	26,342	56.3	1	Locomotive Engineers
Barry	Dorothy Rees	20,770	44.5	1	Constituency
Basingstoke	Marjorie Clark	20,257	44.6	2	Constituency
Bassetlaw	Frederick Bellenger	31,589	57.6	1	Constituency
Bath	Hugh Bruce Oliphant Cardew	19,340	39.5	2	Constituency
Batley and Morley	Alfred Broughton	29,776	60.0	1	Constituency
Battersea North	Douglas Jay	24,762	69.6	1	Constituency
Battersea South	Caroline Ganley	16,142	46.3	1	Co-op
Bebington	Frank Soskice	22,090	38.3	2	Constituency
Beckenham	Alexander Bain	18,723	29.4	2	Constituency
Bedford	Thomas Skeffington-Lodge	19,834	43.1	2	Constituency
Bedwellty	Harold Finch	31,329	83.4	1	Mineworkers
Belper	George Brown	30,904	53.2	1	Transport & General Workers
Bermondsey	Bob Mellish	26,018	76.9	1	Transport & General Workers
Berwick and East Lothian	John Robertson	17,105	40.9	1	Transport & General Workers
Berwick-upon-Tweed	John Davis	8,651	25.7	3	Constituency
Bethnal Green	Percy Holman	20,519	63.1	1	Co-op
Beverley	Arnold William Gray	12,399	25.9	2	Constituency
Bexley	Ashley Bramall	25,721	45.7	2	Constituency
Billericay	Albert Oram	19,437	41.3	2	Co-op
Bilston	Will Nally	29,919	62.6	1	Co-op
Birkenhead	Percy Collick	26,472	49.9	1	Locomotive Engineers
Birmingham Aston	Woodrow Wyatt	28,867	60.8	1	Constituency
Birmingham Edgbaston	James Arthur Hobson	17,512	37.3	2	Constituency
Birmingham Erdington	Julius Silverman	29,252	51.8	1	Constituency
Birmingham Hall Green	Thomas Crehan	20,591	42.2	2	Constituency
Birmingham Handsworth	Cyril Bence	18,774	39.2	2	Constituency
Birmingham King's Norton	Albert Bradbeer	21,715	40.2	2	Constituency
Birmingham Ladywood	Victor Yates	25,603	61.4	1	Constituency
Birmingham Northfield	Raymond Blackburn	26,714	53.0	1	Constituency
Birmingham Perry Barr	Cecil Poole	23,178	56.6	1	Railwaymen
Birmingham Small Heath	Fred Longden	31,985	62.8	1	Co-op
Birmingham Sparkbrook	Percy Shurmer	24,942	61.5	1	Constituency
Birmingham Stechford	Roy Jenkins	33,077	58.5	1	Constituency
Birmingham Yardley	Henry Usborne	22,342	51.2	1	Constituency
Bishop Auckland	Hugh Dalton	25,039	57.9	1	Constituency
Blackburn East	Barbara Castle	19,480	52.8	1	Constituency
Blackburn West	John Edwards	17,450	47.5	2	Constituency
Blackpool North	E. B. Muir	15,308	32.6	2	Constituency
Blackpool South	Ernest Machin	14,190	30.7	2	Constituency
Blaydon	William Whiteley	28,343	68.9	1	Mineworkers
Blyth	Alfred Robens	40,245	74.7	1	Shop Workers
Bodmin	William Royle	8,434	21.3	3	Constituency
Bolsover	Harold Neal	34,017	80.6	1	Mineworkers
Bolton East	Alfred Booth	24,826	45.5	1	Constituency
Bolton West	John Lewis	23,232	44.6	1	Constituency
Bootle	John Kinley	25,472	52.8	1	Constituency
Bosworth	Arthur Allen	29,282	53.6	1	Boot & Shoe
Bothwell	John Timmons	25,715	56.7	1	Mineworkers
Bournemouth East and Christchurch	Dodo Lees	12,790	27.2	2	Constituency
Bournemouth West	W. A. Boddy	15,476	29.1	2	Constituency
Bradford Central	Maurice Webb	24,822	58.7	1	Constituency
Bradford East	Frank McLeavy	27,694	59.8	1	Transport & General Workers
Bradford North	Muriel Nichol	18,517	41.0	2	Constituency
Bradford South	George Craddock	21,344	47.5	1	Shop Workers
Brecon and Radnor	Tudor Watkins	22,519	48.8	1	Constituency
Brentford and Chiswick	Francis Noel-Baker	17,551	45.6	2	Constituency
Bridgwater	Norman Carr	16,053	36.1	2	Co-op
Bridlington	Wilfrid Pashby	9,013	17.6	3	Constituency
Brierley Hill	Charles Simmons	24,302	50.3	1	General & Municipal Workers
Brigg	Lance Mallalieu	28,934	52.7	1	Constituency
Brighouse and Spenborough	Frederick Cobb	25,588	52.2	1	Constituency
Brighton Kemptown	Joseph Huddart	19,430	42.3	2	Constituency
Brighton Pavilion	Leonard Knowles	12,264	28.0	2	Constituency
Bristol Central	Stan Awbery	25,889	59.7	1	Transport & General Workers
Bristol North East	Will Coldrick	20,456	49.4	1	Co-op
Bristol North West	Claud Morris	21,394	42.7	2	Constituency
Bristol South	William Wilkins	23,456	59.9	1	Typographical
Bristol South East	Stafford Cripps	29,393	62.6	1	Constituency
Bristol West	Edward Bishop	12,677	30.0	2	Draughtsmen
Brixton	Marcus Lipton	24,015	52.8	1	Constituency
Bromley	J. R. Elliott	12,354	30.7	2	Constituency
Bromsgrove	Donald Chesworth	21,484	43.6	2	Constituency
Broxtowe	Seymour Cocks	35,471	72.5	1	Constituency
Buckingham	Aidan Crawley	20,782	47.1	1	Constituency
Burnley	Wilfrid Burke	30,685	55.7	1	Shop Workers
Burton	Arthur W. Lyne	23,418	48.5	2	Constituency
Bury and Radcliffe	John Owen	25,705	44.4	2	Engineers
Bury St Edmunds	Cecily Alicia McCall	18,430	40.3	2	Constituency
Bute and North Ayrshire	George Aitken	12,243	35.7	2	Constituency
Caernarvon	Goronwy Roberts	18,369	49.1	1	Constituency
Caerphilly	Ness Edwards	30,270	77.5	1	Mineworkers
Caithness and Sutherland	Alasdair MacArthur	5,676	29.3	3	Constituency
Cambridge	Arthur Symonds	20,297	40.0	2	Constituency
Cambridgeshire	A. E. Stubbs	19,046	40.3	2	Constituency
Cannock	Jennie Lee	33,476	67.9	1	Constituency
Canterbury	Jackson Newman	14,563	30.8	1	Constituency
Cardiff North	William Howlett	21,081	41.3	2	General & Municipal Workers
Cardiff South East	James Callaghan	26,254	51.8	1	Constituency
Cardiff West	George Thomas	27,200	54.3	1	Constituency
Cardigan	Iwan James Morgan	9,055	27.6	2	Constituency
Carlisle	Alex Hargreaves	19,031	46.5	1	Railway Clerks
Carlton	Florence Paton	19,190	40.0	2	Constituency
Carmarthen	Lynn Ungoed-Thomas	24,285	49.8	2	Constituency
Carshalton	Sydney Sharman	21,536	38.4	2	Constituency
Central Ayrshire	Archie Manuel	21,901	52.0	1	Constituency
Central Norfolk	George Holderness	16,516	41.5	2	Constituency
Cheadle	Hatton Jones	13,389	25.3	2	Constituency
Chelmsford	Brian Ralph Clapham	20,124	40.2	2	Constituency
Chelsea	Frederick Lionel Tonge	9,987	27.3	2	Constituency
Cheltenham	Kamalakant Pendse	12,725	29.5	2	Constituency
Chertsey	Dennis Gordon	14,090	37.7	2	Co-op CHECK
City of Chester	Campbell McKinnon	16,021	34.8	2	Constituency
Chesterfield	George Benson	33,914	60.8	1	Constituency
Chester-le-Street	Patrick Bartley	35,348	77.3	1	Mineworkers
Chichester	David George Packham	12,614	27.1	2	Constituency
Chippenham	Geoffrey Drain	13,748	34.2	2	Constituency
Chislehurst	George Wallace	25,048	44.5	2	Constituency
Chorley	Clifford Kenyon	23,233	47.6	1	Constituency
Cirencester and Tewkesbury	R. M. Bennett	15,660	33.9	2	Constituency
Cities of London and Westminster	John Lewis Curthoys	14,849	28.0	2	Constituency
Clackmannan and East Stirlingshire	Arthur Woodburn	22,980	56.5	1	Constituency
Clapham	Charles Gibson	23,300	47.5	1	Transport & General Workers
Cleveland	George Willey	28,940	51.4	1	General & Municipal Workers
Clitheroe	Harry Randall	18,359	43.8	2	Post Office Workers
Coatbridge and Airdrie	Jean Mann	23,239	56.5	1	Constituency
Colchester	Joan Edmonson	17,096	35.9	2	Constituency
Colne Valley	Glenvil Hall	19,284	44.3	1	Constituency
Consett	James Glanville	34,907	66.8	1	Mineworkers
Conway	Elwyn Jones	15,176	38.4	1	Constituency
Coventry East	Richard Crossman	30,456	59.3	1	Constituency
Coventry North	Maurice Edelman	28,294	57.9	1	Constituency
Coventry South	Elaine Burton	26,754	48.4	2	Constituency
Crewe	Scholefield Allen	28,981	53.3	1	Constituency
Crosby	Ronald Lewis	9,403	25.4	2	Constituency
Croydon East	Marion Billson	20,903	37.8	2	Constituency
Croydon North	Reg Prentice	19,738	36.6	2	Constituency
Croydon West	David Rees-Williams	20,424	45.1	2	Constituency
Dagenham	John Parker	43,300	72.5	1	Constituency
Darlington	David Hardman	23,528	44.8	1	Constituency
Dartford	Norman Dodds	38,128	56.4	1	Co-op
Darwen	Ronald Haines	13,334	36.1	2	Constituency
Dearne Valley	Wilfred Paling	40,420	79.6	1	Mineworkers
Denbigh	John Hughes	11,205	24.9	3	Constituency
Deptford	Jack Cooper	28,230	63.1	1	General & Municipal Workers
Derby North	Clifford Wilcock	22,410	55.2	1	Constituency
Derby South	Philip Noel-Baker	26,886	60.1	1	Constituency
Devizes	Wilfred Cave	16,216	42.2	2	Constituency
Dewsbury	William Paling	29,341	53.6	1	Mineworkers
Don Valley	Thomas Williams	39,789	74.0	1	Mineworkers
Doncaster	Ray Gunter	24,449	50.9	1	Railway Clerks
Dorking	Julian Richard	11,114	29.8	2	Constituency
Dover	Will Owen	24,995	46.7	2	Co-op
Droylsden	George Woods	25,238	48.7	1	Co-op
Dudley	George Wigg	32,856	54.6	1	Constituency
Dulwich	Wilfrid Vernon	25,511	46.7	1	Constituency
Dumfries	Harry Wilson	18,025	40.7	2	Constituency
Dundee East	Thomas Cook	26,005	53.3	1	Electrical
Dundee West	John Strachey	28,386	53.5	1	Constituency
Dunfermline Burghs	James Clunie	23,641	61.2	1	Constituency
Durham	Charles Grey	36,024	68.1	1	Mineworkers
Ealing North	James Hindle Hudson	24,157	47.6	1	Co-op
Ealing South	J. Neary	17,097	34.2	2	Constituency
Easington	Manny Shinwell	38,367	81.1	1	Constituency
East Aberdeenshire	Gregor Mackenzie	12,886	34.0	2	Constituency
East Dunbartonshire	David Kirkwood	25,943	52.7	1	Engineers
East Fife	Samuel McLaren	10,694	26.5	2	Co-op
East Flintshire	Eirene White	21,529	48.5	1	Constituency
East Grinstead	Catherine Williamson	12,983	24.0	2	Constituency
East Ham North	Percy Daines	20,497	57.1	1	Co-op
East Ham South	Alfred Barnes	23,002	62.1	1	Co-op
East Renfrewshire	William Taylor	16,716	34.6	2	Constituency
East Surrey	Nathan Whine	12,499	23.3	2	Constituency
Eastbourne	Reginald Groves	18,304	30.8	2	Constituency
Ebbw Vale	Aneurin Bevan	28,245	80.7	1	Mineworkers
Eccles	William Proctor	27,409	50.7	1	Railwaymen
Edinburgh Central	Andrew Gilzean	16,568	47.9	1	Constituency
Edinburgh East	John Wheatley	24,072	53.2	1	Constituency
Edinburgh Leith	James Hoy	18,111	49.2	1	Constituency
Edinburgh North	George Willis	13,683	39.3	2	Constituency
Edinburgh Pentlands	Thomas Alexander MacNair	17,912	39.2	2	Constituency
Edinburgh South	William Earsman	8,725	24.6	2	Constituency
Edinburgh West	C. Morgan	14,377	32.0	2	Co-op
Edmonton	Austen Albu	34,897	55.1	1	Engineers
Enfield East	Ernest Davies	24,013	59.3	1	Constituency
Enfield Southgate	Vera Dart	11,023	22.2	2	Constituency
Enfield West	Hugh Jenkins	11,395	32.0	2	Constituency
Epping	Leah Manning	20,385	41.2	2	Constituency
Epsom	Frank Martin Hardie	15,256	28.0	2	Constituency
Esher	Ethel Chipchase	15,514	28.6	2	Constituency
Eton and Slough	Fenner Brockway	19,987	48.5	1	Constituency
Exeter	Tom Horabin	21,135	46.5	2	Constituency
Eye	Leslie George Emsden	12,481	26.2	3	Constituency
Falmouth and Camborne	Harold Hayman	18,988	43.2	1	Constituency
Farnham	Eric Charles Neate	12,972	33.4	2	Constituency
Farnworth	George Tomlinson	25,375	56.6	1	Textile Factory Workers
Faversham	Percy Wells	23,620	48.7	1	Transport & General Workers
Finchley	Dorothy Pickles	19,683	32.3	2	Constituency
Folkestone and Hythe	Edgar Simpkins	9,346	24.3	2	Constituency
Fulham East	Michael Stewart	18,998	50.1	1	Constituency
Fulham West	Edith Summerskill	20,141	51.1	1	Constituency
Fylde North	Philip Henry Couldry	10,515	27.2	2	Constituency
Fylde South	James Brian O'Hara	11,341	22.5	2	Constituency
Gainsborough	Gerald Samson Saville	9,436	32.8	2	Constituency
Galloway	Alan Thompson	10,056	34.5	2	Constituency
Gateshead East	Arthur Moody	15,249	45.1	1	Woodworkers
Gateshead West	John Hall	20,872	64.2	1	General & Municipal Workers
Gillingham	Joseph Binns	18,424	47.3	2	Constituency
Glasgow Bridgeton	James Carmichael	20,268	59.4	1	Constituency
Glasgow Camlachie	William Reid	21,013	51.5	1	Constituency
Glasgow Cathcart	Rosslyn Mitchell	10,269	27.3	2	Constituency
Glasgow Central	James McInnes	14,861	54.6	1	Constituency
Glasgow Gorbals	Alice Cullen	24,010	58.0	1	Constituency
Glasgow Govan	John Davis	18,894	45.7	2	Constituency
Glasgow Hillhead	George Thomson	12,920	33.9	2	Constituency
Glasgow Kelvingrove	John Williams	13,973	45.6	2	Constituency
Glasgow Maryhill	William Hannan	21,990	61.2	1	Constituency
Glasgow Pollok	John Smith Clarke	17,263	38.8	2	Constituency
Glasgow Scotstoun	William Bargh	19,055	46.0	2	Co-op
Glasgow Shettleston	John McGovern	23,467	56.7	1	Constituency
Glasgow Springburn	John Forman	25,603	59.7	1	Co-op
Glasgow Tradeston	John Rankin	26,598	62.9	1	Co-op
Glasgow Woodside	William Leonard	15,966	45.6	2	Co-op
Gloucester	Moss Turner-Samuels	20,202	47.7	1	Constituency
Goole	George Jeger	25,635	60.3	1	Transport & General Workers
Gosport and Fareham	Alfred Robert Nobes	18,579	36.2	2	Constituency
Gower	David Grenfell	32,564	76.1	1	Mineworkers
Grantham	Albert Edward Millett	14,457	31.1	2	Constituency
Gravesend	Richard Acland	28,297	53.1	1	Constituency
Great Yarmouth	Ernest Kinghorn	19,131	44.5	1	Constituency
Greenock	Hector McNeil	20,548	50.6	1	Constituency
Greenwich	Joseph Reeves	29,379	57.9	1	Royal Arsenal Co-op
Grimsby	Kenneth Younger	28,906	56.2	1	Constituency
Guildford	George Bellerby	13,756	29.1	2	Constituency
Hackney North and Stoke Newington	David Weitzman	22,950	52.7	1	Constituency
Hackney South	Herbert Butler	35,821	61.0	1	Constituency
Halifax	Dryden Brook	28,800	47.7	1	Constituency
Haltemprice	Thomas Lester Addy Taylor	18,156	38.3	2	Constituency
Hamilton	Tom Fraser	29,292	70.0	1	Mineworkers
Hammersmith North	Frank Tomney	22,709	66.1	1	Constituency
Hammersmith South	Thomas Williams	18,825	51.8	1	Co-op
Hampstead	William Hawkins	17,373	30.3	2	Constituency
Harborough	Humphrey Attewell	21,381	38.2	2	Boot & Shoe
Harrogate	Edward Parris	13,114	31.5	2	Constituency
Harrow Central	Robert Rees	16,371	37.1	2	Constituency
Harrow East	Frederick Skinnard	22,216	42.0	2	Constituency
Harrow West	Leslie Littlewood	11,971	29.5	2	Constituency
Harwich	Morris Janis	16,756	37.1	2	Constituency
Hastings	Lewis Cohen	17,603	31.0	2	Constituency
Hayes and Harlington	Walter Ayles	22,490	60.1	1	Engineers
Hemel Hempstead	Reg Moss	15,165	34.6	2	Constituency
Hemsworth	Horace Holmes	47,934	82.4	1	Mineworkers
Hendon North	Barbara Ayrton-Gould	18,500	39.6	2	Constituency
Hendon South	Thomas Sargant	15,389	32.2	2	Constituency
Henley	Alan Hawkins	14,709	35.5	2	Constituency
Hereford	William Pigott	11,185	31.5	2	Constituency
Hertford	Lynton Scutts	19,324	35.4	2	Constituency
Heston and Isleworth	William Williams	29,013	43.6	2	Post Office Workers
Heywood and Royton	Charles Hurley	21,482	40.2	2	Electrical
High Peak	Wilfred McCormack Halsall	16,933	39.2	2	Constituency
Hitchin	Philip Asterley Jones	21,829	41.8	2	Constituency
Holborn and St Pancras South	Santo Jeger	19,223	48.5	1	Constituency
Holland-with-Boston	Horace Lee	22,374	39.8	2	Constituency
Honiton	G. R. Sargeant	10,816	23.4	2	Constituency
Horncastle	Francis Clark	11,671	34.3	2	Constituency
Hornchurch	Geoffrey Bing	28,463	46.1	1	Constituency
Hornsey	Reginald Wells-Pestell	22,832	36.2	2	Constituency
Horsham	H. R. Nicholls	11,204	29.2	2	Constituency
Houghton-le-Spring	Billy Blyton	36,044	77.1	1	Mineworkers
Hove	Finlay Rea	11,791	23.4	2	Constituency
Huddersfield East	Joseph Mallalieu	22,296	56.6	1	Constituency
Huddersfield West	Harold William Bolt	17,542	41.8	2	Constituency
Huntingdonshire	Francis Robert Macdonald	13,096	36.3	2	Constituency
Huyton	Harold Wilson	21,536	48.4	1	Constituency
Ilford North	Mabel Ridealgh	21,385	37.3	2	Co-op
Ilford South	Gordon Borrie	16,569	35.1	2	Constituency
Ilkeston	George Oliver	39,495	64.9	1	Transport & General Workers
Ince	Tom Brown	32,145	71.8	1	Mineworkers
Inverness	Desmond Nethersole-Thompson	11,236	31.8	2	Constituency
Ipswich	Richard Stokes	29,386	46.9	1	Constituency
Isle of Ely	Alfred Gray	16,565	34.6	2	Constituency
Isle of Thanet	Christopher Boyd	20,522	36.4	2	Constituency
Isle of Wight	Sydney Conbeer	21,496	39.5	2	Constituency
Islington East	Eric Fletcher	22,477	56.0	1	Constituency
Islington North	Moelwyn Hughes	26,354	57.9	1	Constituency
Islington South West	Albert Evans	30,201	64.7	1	Constituency
Jarrow	Ernest Fernyhough	33,751	63.0	1	Shop Workers
Keighley	Charles Hobson	21,833	48.5	1	Engineers
Kensington North	George Rogers	21,615	50.7	1	Railway Clerks
Kensington South	Marcel Picard	8,002	17.8	2	Constituency
Kettering	Dick Mitchison	30,243	52.6	1	Constituency
Kidderminster	Louis Tolley	19,145	41.7	2	Constituency
Kilmarnock	William Ross	22,412	56.6	1	Constituency
King's Lynn	Frederick Wise	19,399	45.3	1	Constituency
Kingston upon Hull Central	Mark Hewitson	27,351	56.5	1	General & Municipal Workers
Kingston upon Hull East	Harry Pursey	26,903	56.2	1	Constituency
Kingston upon Hull North	Charles Frederick Campbell Lawson	18,041	42.8	2	Constituency
Kingston-upon-Thames	Nora Maitland Johns	21,229	33.9	2	Constituency
Kinross and West Perthshire	Donald MacLaren	5,124	18.6	3	Constituency
Kirkcaldy Burghs	Thomas Hubbard	25,756	60.0	1	Mineworkers
Knutsford	Cyril Hamnett	12,794	25.5	2	Constituency
Lanark	Tom Steele	19,205	49.1	2	Railway Clerks
Lancaster	Albert Farrer	15,341	40.2	2	Constituency
Leeds Central	George Porter	24,030	60.8	1	Woodworkers
Leeds North	Robert Hurst	15,018	31.8	2	Constituency
Leeds North East	Alice Bacon	21,599	54.6	1	Constituency
Leeds North West	Victor Mishcon	14,562	34.8	2	Constituency
Leeds South	Hugh Gaitskell	29,795	61.1	1	Constituency
Leeds South East	James Milner	23,994	57.8	1	Constituency
Leeds West	Charles Pannell	21,339	51.6	1	Engineers
Leek	Harold Davies	30,444	53.8	1	Constituency
Leicester North East	Terence Donovan	25,305	56.5	1	Constituency
Leicester North West	Barnett Janner	23,505	52.9	1	Constituency
Leicester South East	Sydney Kersland Lewis	14,823	36.3	2	Constituency
Leicester South West	Herbert Bowden	23,999	54.6	1	Constituency
Leigh	Harold Boardman	34,320	63.5	1	Shop Workers
Leominster	Edmund Jones	8,402	26.0	2	Constituency
Lewes	William Reay	13,065	30.6	2	Constituency
Lewisham North	Fred Copeman	19,974	44.1	2	Constituency
Lewisham South	Herbert Morrison	26,666	54.6	1	Constituency
Lewisham West	Arthur Skeffington	21,433	44.7	2	Royal Arsenal Co-op
Leyton	Reginald Sorensen	35,702	54.6	1	Constituency
Lichfield and Tamworth	Julian Snow	29,199	54.2	1	Constituency
Lincoln	Geoffrey de Freitas	21,537	50.0	1	Constituency
Liverpool Edge Hill	Arthur Irvine	21,834	50.9	1	Constituency
Liverpool Exchange	Bessie Braddock	19,492	57.3	1	Constituency
Liverpool Garston	Edgar Hewitt	17,477	31.6	2	Constituency
Liverpool Kirkdale	William Keenan	19,219	48.7	1	Transport & General Workers
Liverpool Scotland	David Logan	28,087	65.4	1	Constituency
Liverpool Toxteth	Joseph Gibbins	19,038	43.5	2	General & Municipal Workers
Liverpool Walton	James Haworth	21,983	41.4	2	Railway Clerks
Liverpool Wavertree	William Hamling	18,559	36.9	2	Constituency
Liverpool West Derby	Bertie Kirby	25,417	48.1	2	Clerks
Llanelly	Jim Griffiths	39,326	70.8	1	Mineworkers
Loughborough	Mont Follick	25,921	57.5	1	Constituency
Louth	Henry James Herbert Dyer	15,063	37.2	2	Constituency
Lowestoft	Edward Evans	20,838	44.8	1	Constituency
Ludlow	Ivor Arthur Jack Williams	14,573	39.5	2	Constituency
Luton	William Warbey	21,860	44.4	2	Constituency
Macclesfield	Fred Blackburn	19,219	38.0	2	Constituency
Maidstone	Henry Albert White	18,377	37.6	2	Transport & General Workers
Maldon	Tom Driberg	20,567	47.5	1	Constituency
Manchester Ardwick	Leslie Lever	22,628	55.8	1	Constituency
Manchester Blackley	John Diamond	21,392	42.3	1	Constituency
Manchester Cheetham	Harold Lever	22,012	58.0	1	Constituency
Manchester Clayton	Harry Thorneycroft	29,128	63.0	1	Constituency
Manchester Exchange	William Griffiths	18,335	54.1	1	Constituency
Manchester Gorton	Konni Zilliacus	23,337	50.9	1	Constituency
Manchester Moss Side	Roland Casasola	16,769	37.5	2	Foundry Workers
Manchester Withington	Lewis Wright	14,206	32.6	2	Textile Factory Workers
Manchester Wythenshawe	Charles Bridges	17,191	37.2	2	Railwaymen
Mansfield	Bernard Taylor	36,224	66.7	1	Mineworkers
Melton	Archibald Crawford	18,379	35.6	2	Constituency
Merioneth	Owen Parry	8,577	34.5	2	Constituency
Merthyr Tydfil	S. O. Davies	29,120	78.9	1	Mineworkers
Merton and Morden	Arthur Palmer	21,135	43.0	2	Constituency
Mid Bedfordshire	William Howell	15,512	36.3	2	Constituency
Middlesbrough East	Hilary Marquand	29,185	62.8	1	Constituency
Middlesbrough West	Geoffrey Cooper	21,593	46.3	1	Constituency
Middleton and Prestwich	Charles Hilditch	16,716	34.3	2	Constituency
Midlothian and Peebles	David Pryde	26,966	52.8	1	Mineworkers
Mitcham	Tom Braddock	27,055	43.1	2	Constituency
Monmouth	Graham Frederick Thomas	17,725	44.7	2	Constituency
Montgomeryshire	John David Williams	6,760	23.5	3	Constituency
Moray and Nairn	Richard Murray	10,383	40.2	2	Constituency
Morecambe and Lonsdale	Albert Gaskell	12,768	27.4	2	Constituency
Morpeth	Robert Taylor	27,548	71.5	1	Mineworkers
Motherwell	Alexander Anderson	22,608	54.2	1	Constituency
Neath	D. J. Williams	33,034	73.0	1	Mineworkers
Nelson and Colne	Sydney Silverman	25,538	54.6	1	Constituency
New Forest	Aubrey White	15,986	31.5	2	Constituency
Newark	George Deer	28,959	54.2	1	Transport & General Workers
Newbury	Colin Jackson	11,914	34.7	2	Constituency
Newcastle-under-Lyme	John Mack	30,249	57.8	1	Life Assurance Workers
Newcastle upon Tyne Central	Lyall Wilkes	25,190	63.7	1	Constituency
Newcastle upon Tyne East	Arthur Blenkinsop	24,694	51.5	1	Constituency
Newcastle upon Tyne North	W. Henry Shackleton	16,860	35.9	2	Engineers
Newcastle upon Tyne West	Ernest Popplewell	31,230	58.2	1	Railwaymen
Newport	Peter Freeman	31,858	51.0	1	Constituency
Newton	Frederick Lee	31,832	59.1	1	Engineers
Normanton	Thomas Brooks	31,986	74.5	1	Mineworkers
North Angus and Mearns	James Robertson Justice	8,304	27.7	2	Constituency
North Cornwall	Herbert Leslie Richardson	5,521	15.1	3	Constituency
North Devon	William Alexander Barker	8,892	23.2	3	Constituency
North Dorset	J. R. Tudor Griffith	4,807	13.6	3	Constituency
North East Derbyshire	Henry White	33,417	66.3	1	Mineworkers
North Lanarkshire	Peggy Herbison	22,162	58.3	1	Constituency
North Norfolk	Edwin Gooch	19,790	48.0	1	Agricultural Workers
North West Durham	James Murray	31,084	69.7	1	Mineworkers
Northampton	Reginald Paget	31,946	49.0	1	Constituency
Northwich	Charles Mapp	19,886	38.2	2	Constituency
Norwich North	John Paton	21,898	59.2	1	Transport & General Workers
Norwich South	Mabel Tylecote	16,368	46.7	2	Constituency
Norwood	Ronald Chamberlain	22,736	44.3	2	Constituency
Nottingham Central	Ian Winterbottom	19,237	46.3	1	Constituency
Nottingham East	James Harrison	20,404	46.5	1	Railwaymen
Nottingham North West	Tom O'Brien	30,223	61.2	1	Constituency
Nottingham South	Norman Smith	18,806	48.0	1	Co-op
Nuneaton	Frank Bowles	35,129	58.7	1	Constituency
Ogmore	Walter Padley	35,836	74.7	1	Shop Workers
Oldbury and Halesowen	Arthur Moyle	28,379	50.4	1	Public Employees
Oldham East	Frank Fairhurst	21,510	45.0	1	Textile Factory Workers
Oldham West	Leslie Hale	22,533	47.6	1	Constituency
Orkney and Zetland	Harald Leslie	3,335	21.3	3	Constituency
Ormskirk	Lewis Edwards	14,583	33.7	2	Constituency
Orpington	George Vaughan	14,161	32.8	2	Constituency
Oswestry	Arthur George Wait	14,556	38.2	2	Constituency
Oxford	Elizabeth Pakenham	23,902	40.7	2	Constituency
Paddington North	Bill Field	18,690	51.6	1	Constituency
Paddington South	Charles Wegg-Prosser	13,141	36.8	2	Constituency
Paisley	Douglas Johnston	29,204	56.1	1	Constituency
Peckham	Freda Corbet	32,623	66.4	1	Constituency
Pembrokeshire	Desmond Donnelly	25,550	50.1	1	Constituency
Penistone	Henry McGhee	34,979	62.0	1	Constituency
Penrith and the Border	Cecil John Taylor	10,441	23.7	3	Constituency
Perth and East Perthshire	William Hughes	11,706	26.4	2	Constituency
Peterborough	Stanley Tiffany	22,671	45.7	2	Co-op
Petersfield	Irene Candy	15,472	31.1	2	Constituency
Plymouth Devonport	Michael Foot	30,812	50.6	1	Constituency
Plymouth Sutton	Lucy Middleton	27,512	47.7	1	Constituency
Pontefract	George Sylvester	35,432	75.6	1	Mineworkers
Pontypool	Granville West	28,267	72.3	1	Constituency
Pontypridd	Arthur Pearson	30,945	68.9	1	Constituency
Poole	Evelyn King	17,831	36.2	2	Constituency
Poplar	Charles Key	30,756	78.2	1	Transport & General Workers
Portsmouth Langstone	Percy Knight	17,691	35.4	2	Seamen
Portsmouth South	Leslie Merrion	17,545	36.1	2	Builders
Portsmouth West	Donald Bruce	23,979	48.8	2	Constituency
Preston North	Samuel Segal	20,950	46.3	2	Constituency
Preston South	Edward Shackleton	22,716	50.2	1	Constituency
Pudsey	Geoffrey Collings	18,205	41.2	2	Railway Clerks
Putney	Irene Chaplin	22,315	41.2	2	Constituency
Reading North	Kim Mackay	15,681	46.0	1	Constituency
Reading South	Ian Mikardo	17,704	48.7	1	Constituency
Reigate	Charles Garnsworthy	13,931	32.5	2	Co-op
Rhondda East	William Mainwaring	26,645	75.9	1	Mineworkers
Rhondda West	Iorwerth Thomas	27,150	82.4	1	Mineworkers
Richmond (Yorks)	Frederick William Beaton	8,694	22.4	2	Constituency
Richmond upon Thames	Karl Thorold Westwood	17,238	32.1	2	Constituency
Ripon	W. S. Hill	11,317	33.7	2	Constituency
Rochdale	Joseph Hale	25,484	44.9	1	Engineers
Rochester and Chatham	Arthur Bottomley	24,855	50.5	1	Constituency
Romford	Thomas Macpherson	26,387	43.9	2	Constituency
Ross and Cromarty	Alastair Reid	6,521	37.4	2	Constituency
Rossendale	Tony Greenwood	21,596	45.2	1	Constituency
Rother Valley	David Griffiths	42,222	76.6	1	Mineworkers
Rotherham	Jack Jones	31,211	64.4	1	Iron & Steel
Rowley Regis and Tipton	Arthur Henderson	31,988	64.3	1	Constituency
Roxburgh and Selkirk	L. P. Thomas	9,413	24.2	3	Constituency
Rugby	James Johnson	15,983	41.0	1	Constituency
Ruislip-Northwood	A. L. Birk	13,568	33.8	2	Constituency
Runcorn	Horace Lionel Wharrad	14,063	34.3	2	Constituency
Rushcliffe	Hugh Lawson	20,860	39.1	2	Constituency
Rutherglen	Gilbert McAllister	18,779	49.5	1	Constituency
Rutland and Stamford	Tom Bradley	13,712	41.3	2	Railway Clerks
Saffron Walden	Sidney Stanley Wilson	14,908	37.6	2	Constituency
St Albans	Cyril Dumpleton	22,351	42.7	2	Constituency
St Helens	Hartley Shawcross	39,514	63.2	1	Constituency
St Ives	Peter Shore	11,118	30.7	2	Constituency
St Marylebone	John Silkin	12,890	29.7	2	Constituency
St Pancras North	Kenneth Robinson	29,163	55.8	1	Constituency
Salford East	Edward Arthur Hardy	26,783	54.2	1	Constituency
Salford West	Charles Royle	26,885	51.1	1	Constituency
Salisbury	W. A. J. Case	12,319	32.0	2	Constituency
Scarborough and Whitby	Philip Taylor	14,421	27.6	2	Constituency
Sedgefield	Joseph Slater	27,946	62.5	1	Mineworkers
Sevenoaks	Roderick Ogley	14,265	28.4	2	Constituency
Sheffield Attercliffe	John Hynd	30,726	71.6	1	Railwaymen
Sheffield Brightside	Richard Winterbottom	32,542	69.6	1	Shop Workers
Sheffield Hallam	Charles Spears	11,444	26.5	2	General & Municipal Workers
Sheffield Heeley	Arnold Jennings	17,856	37.8	2	Constituency
Sheffield Hillsborough	George Darling	28,295	58.7	1	Co-op
Sheffield Neepsend	Harry Morris	30,317	72.8	1	Constituency
Sheffield Park	Fred Mulley	30,558	67.7	1	Clerks
Shipley	Arthur Creech Jones	18,309	43.6	2	Transport & General Workers
Shoreditch and Finsbury	Ernest Thurtle	22,150	53.2	1	Constituency
Shrewsbury	Robert Cant	12,542	33.8	2	Constituency
Skipton	Thomas Robets	16,290	36.0	2	Constituency
Smethwick	Patrick Gordon Walker	28,750	62.1	1	Constituency
Solihull	W. N. Camp	11,741	28.8	2	Constituency
Somerset North	Xenia Field	23,050	43.8	2	Constituency
South Angus	Norman Hogg	9,176	25.6	2	Scottish Bakers
South Ayrshire	Emrys Hughes	22,284	60.2	1	Constituency
South Bedfordshire	Edward Moeran	20,070	45.3	1	Constituency
South Buckinghamshire	Cyril Dee	11,389	23.9	2	Draughtsmen
South Dorset	Frederick Newman Stacey	17,471	39.7	2	Constituency
South East Derbyshire	Arthur Champion	30,039	49.1	1	Railwaymen
South Gloucestershire	Anthony Crosland	24,458	48.8	1	Constituency
South Norfolk	Christopher Mayhew	15,714	43.7	2	Constituency
South Northamptonshire	Dennis Webb	16,852	43.1	2	Constituency
South Shields	Chuter Ede	33,452	56.5	1	Constituency
South West Hertfordshire	Lawrence Allaker	14,913	35.0	2	Constituency
South West Norfolk	Sidney Dye	15,649	47.4	1	Constituency
South Worcestershire	Patrick Tennyson-Hopwood	15,668	36.8	2	Constituency
Southall	George Pargiter	27,107	53.9	1	Engineers
Southampton Itchen	Ralph Morley	29,749	53.4	1	Constituency
Southampton Test	Horace King	25,052	47.1	1	Constituency
Southend East	R. J. Minney	18,230	42.2	2	Constituency
Southend West	Eric Hutchison	15,345	25.9	2	Co-op
Southport	J. P. Bonney	14,159	26.8	2	Constituency
Southwark	George Isaacs	35,049	68.3	1	Printers
Sowerby	Douglas Houghton	22,846	45.4	1	Constituency
Spelthorne	Frederick Wilson Temple	26,146	45.6	2	Constituency
Stafford and Stone	Stephen Swingler	19,008	41.6	2	Constituency
Stalybridge and Hyde	Gordon Lang	23,462	46.6	1	Constituency
Stepney	Walter Edwards	33,475	70.0	1	Transport & General Workers
Stirling and Falkirk	Malcolm MacPherson	22,186	49.0	1	Constituency
Stockport North	Albert Maurice Watson	19,134	40.3	2	Constituency
Stockport South	Harry Ponsonby	16,897	40.5	2	Constituency
Stockton-on-Tees	George Chetwynd	23,475	54.0	1	Constituency
Stoke-on-Trent Central	Barnett Stross	34,908	65.5	1	Constituency
Stoke-on-Trent North	Albert Davies	36,896	71.6	1	Railway Clerks
Stoke-on-Trent South	Ellis Smith	34,339	64.5	1	Constituency
Stratford-on-Avon	R. G. M. Brown	12,143	32.0	2	Constituency
Streatham	Peter Benenson	15,235	32.9	2	Constituency
Stretford	Herschel Austin	25,075	39.7	2	Constituency
Stroud and Thornbury	Ben Parkin	24,846	43.4	2	Constituency
Sudbury and Woodbridge	Roland Hamilton	19,062	39.0	2	Constituency
Sunderland North	Fred Willey	24,816	54.1	1	Constituency
Sunderland South	Richard Ewart	27,192	49.6	1	General & Municipal Workers
Sutton and Cheam	Helen Judd	17,706	34.5	2	Constituency
Sutton Coldfield	A. Wilson	21,364	37.2	2	Constituency
Swansea East	David Mort	32,680	75.3	1	Iron & Steel
Swansea West	Percy Morris	26,273	53.8	1	Railway Clerks
Swindon	Thomas Reid	21,976	51.5	1	Constituency
Taunton	Victor Collins	19,352	43.4	2	Constituency
Tavistock	Frank Harcourt-Munning	10,189	27.4	2	Constituency
The Hartlepools	D. T. Jones	25,609	50.6	1	Railwaymen
The Wrekin	Ivor Owen Thomas	19,730	53.7	1	Railwaymen
Thirsk and Malton	Ivan Ernest Geffen	11,480	28.5	2	Constituency
Thurrock	Hugh Delargy	22,893	52.7	1	Constituency
Tiverton	Patrick Duffy	12,055	30.5	2	Constituency
Tonbridge	Brian Clapham	19,525	36.3	2	Constituency
Torquay	Robert Briscoe	14,287	26.3	2	Constituency
Torrington	Thomas Chappell	8,735	23.3	3	Constituency
Totnes	David Widdicombe	15,767	29.6	2	Constituency
Tottenham	Frederick Messer	30,901	56.9	1	Co-op
Truro	Henry Brinton	15,617	34.5	2	Constituency
Twickenham	John Stonehouse	23,088	35.1	2	Constituency
Tynemouth	Grace Colman	23,148	39.7	2	Constituency
Uxbridge	Frank Beswick	20,139	48.1	1	Co-op
Vauxhall	George Strauss	23,988	62.5	1	Constituency
Wakefield	Arthur Greenwood	25,996	55.4	1	Constituency
Wallasey	John London Hindle	18,989	32.0	2	Constituency
Wallsend	John McKay	33,790	56.4	1	Mineworkers
Walsall	William Wells	36,483	53.9	1	Constituency
Walthamstow East	Harry Wallace	18,478	47.0	1	Post Office Workers
Walthamstow West	Clement Attlee	21,095	60.5	1	Constituency
Wandsworth Central	Richard Adams	27,582	48.5	1	Constituency
Warrington	Hyacinth Morgan	26,482	56.8	1	Constituency
Warwick and Leamington	Howel Bithell	18,400	40.2	2	Constituency
Watford	John Freeman	21,759	47.4	1	Constituency
Wednesbury	Stanley Evans	35,196	60.5	1	Constituency
Wellingborough	George Lindgren	21,640	47.1	1	Railway Clerks
Wells	Dorothy Archibald	17,987	37.2	2	Constituency
Wembley North	Bernard Lewis	14,987	34.7	2	Co-op
Wembley South	Clarence Barton	17,251	40.2	2	Constituency
West Aberdeenshire	Tom Oswald	7,298	23.1	2	Constituency
West Bromwich	John Dugdale	31,564	65.4	1	Constituency
West Derbyshire	Norman Gratton	13,478	35.0	2	General & Municipal Workers
West Dorset	Cambreth John Kane	11,967	33.0	2	Constituency
West Dunbartonshire	Adam McKinlay	20,398	49.3	1	Transport & General Workers
West Fife	Willie Hamilton	23,576	54.8	1	Constituency
West Flintshire	David Leadbeater	12,369	31.3	2	Constituency
West Gloucestershire	M. Philips Price	22,765	54.8	1	Constituency
West Ham North	Arthur Lewis	33,782	68.6	1	Constituency
West Ham South	Elwyn Jones	36,754	82.4	1	Constituency
West Lothian	George Mathers	27,236	60.6	1	Constituency
West Renfrewshire	Thomas Scollan	17,708	46.0	2	Shop Workers
West Stirlingshire	Alfred Balfour	19,930	55.6	1	Railwaymen
Westbury	Reginald Travess	15,766	35.6	2	Railwaymen
Western Isles	Malcolm Macmillan	8,387	53.2	1	Constituency
Westhoughton	Rhys Davies	30,117	62.3	1	Shop Workers
Westmorland	Paul Wilson	9,031	22.4	3	Constituency
Weston-super-Mare	Michael Hill	13,294	28.0	2	Constituency
Whitehaven	Frank Anderson	22,850	60.0	1	Constituency
Widnes	James MacColl	21,253	54.1	1	Constituency
Wigan	Ronald Williams	32,746	62.5	1	Mineworkers
Willesden East	Maurice Orbach	24,345	47.1	1	Constituency
Willesden West	Samuel Viant	33,963	61.1	1	Woodworkers
Wimbledon	George Leonard Deacon	20,296	30.9	2	Constituency
Winchester	Louis Frederick Cornillie	23,955	43.2	2	Co-op
Windsor	Marjorie Nicholson	14,300	33.8	2	Constituency
Wirral	Herbert Arthur Kelly	15,993	31.2	2	Constituency
Woking	T. Davies	13,157	31.2	2	Constituency
Wokingham	Eric Hubble	10,296	28.8	2	Constituency
Wolverhampton North East	John Baird	29,235	59.3	1	Constituency
Wolverhampton South West	Billy Hughes	19,548	44.4	2	Constituency
Wood Green	William Irving	28,480	52.4	1	Co-op
Woodford	Seymour Hills	18,740	30.0	2	Typographical
Woolwich East	Ernest Bevin	26,604	61.6	1	Transport & General Workers
Woolwich West	Henry Berry	21,118	46.3	2	Royal Arsenal Co-op
Worcester	John Evans	19,807	40.6	2	Co-op
Workington	Fred Peart	25,104	57.6	1	Constituency
Worthing	Edgar Duchin	10,028	22.7	2	Constituency
Wrexham	Robert Richards	32,042	57.8	1	Constituency
Wycombe	John Haire	21,491	42.1	1	Constituency
Yeovil	Maurice Shinwell	19,532	39.3	2	Constituency
York	Haydn Davies	29,344	46.2	2	Constituency

=== By-elections, 1950-1951 ===
By-election	Candidate	Votes	%	Position	Sponsor
1950 Sheffield Neepsend by-election	Frank Soskice	22,080	70.8	1	Constituency
1950 West Dunbartonshire by-election	Tom Steele	20,367	50.4	1	Transport Staff
1950 Brighouse and Spenborough by-election	John Edwards	24,004	50.5	1	Constituency
1950 Leicester North East by-election	Lynn Ungoed-Thomas	18,777	57.9	1	Constituency
1950 Glasgow Scotstoun by-election	William Bargh	17,175	47.3	2	Co-op
1950 Oxford by-election	Sydney Kersland Lewis	20,385	42.5	2	
1950 Birmingham Handsworth by-election	Cyril Bence	13,852	38.1	2	Constituency
1950 Bristol South East by-election	Tony Benn	19,367	56.7	1	Constituency
1950 Abertillery by-election	Llywelyn Williams	24,622	86.5	1	Constituency
1951 Bristol West by-election	Harold Lawrance	5,072	18.6	2	Constituency
1951 Ormskirk by-election	Herbert Arthur Kelly	8,969	26.5	2	
1951 Harrow West by-election	Leslie Littlewood	8,877	28.0	2	Constituency
1951 Woolwich East by-election	Christopher Mayhew	20,801	60.7	1	Constituency
1951 Westhoughton by-election	Tom Price	25,368	60.4	1	Shop Workers

=== 1951 UK general election ===
Constituency	Candidate	Votes	%	Position	Sponsor
Aberavon	William Cove	30,498	72.0	1	Constituency
Aberdare	David Thomas	34,783	78.6	1	Mineworkers
Aberdeen North	Hector Hughes	33,711	64.7	1	Constituency
Aberdeen South	Sinclair Shaw	20,325	41.3	2	Constituency
Abertillery	Llewellyn Williams	29,321	86.9	1	Constituency
Abingdon	John Curthoys	19,891	44.5	2	Constituency
Accrington	Henry Hynd	24,802	52.3	1	Constituency
Acton	Joseph Sparks	23,287	52.2	1	Railwaymen
Aldershot	Robert Hales	16,402	39.7	2	Constituency
Altrincham and Sale	Brian O'Hara	17,465	33.9	2	Constituency
Anglesey	Cledwyn Hughes	11,814	40.1	1	Constituency
Argyll	Robert Young	9,925	31.9	2	Constituency
Arundel and Shoreham	Margaret Reid	16,923	32.6	2	Constituency
Ashford	Neville Sandelson	16,645	40.9	2	Constituency
Ashton-under-Lyne	Hervey Rhodes	21,424	52.1	1	Constituency
Aylesbury	Tony Harman	17,605	44.0	2	Constituency
Ayr	Jenny Auld	15,702	41.7	2	Constituency
Banbury	William Bird	19,672	39.6	2	General & Municipal Workers
Banffshire	Alexander Flett	6,806	29.1	2	Constituency
Barking	Somerville Hastings	30,486	67.4	1	Constituency
Barkston Ash	Herbert Victor Wiseman	18,537	42.4	2	Constituency
Barnet	Cyril Fenton	22,375	35.9	2	Co-operative
Barnsley	Sidney Schofield	37,523	69.7	1	Mineworkers
Barrow-in-Furness	Walter Monslow	26,709	56.9	1	Locomotive Engineers
Barry	Dorothy Rees	23,066	48.3	2	Constituency
Basingstoke	Arthur Carr	20,580	44.1	2	Constituency
Bassetlaw	Frederick Bellenger	32,580	60.7	1	Constituency
Bath	Victor Mishcon	22,530	44.7	2	Constituency
Batley and Morley	Alfred Broughton	29,326	59.7	1	Constituency
Battersea North	Douglas Jay	20,980	70.7	1	Constituency
Battersea South	Caroline Ganley	17,237	49.3	2	Co-operative
Bebington	Edward W. Harby	22,190	38.7	2	Co-operative
Beckenham	Philip Magonet	19,982	32.6	2	Constituency
Bedford	Peter Parker	20,494	43.5	2	Constituency
Bedwellty	Harold Finch	31,582	83.3	1	Mineworkers
Belper	George Brown	32,875	57.1	1	Constituency
Bermondsey	Bob Mellish	26,267	78.9	1	Constituency
Berwick and East Lothian	John Robertson	20,152	47.2	2	Constituency
Berwick-upon-Tweed	Thomas Jones	11,069	33.1	2	Co-operative
Bethnal Green	Percy Holman	22,162	69.7	1	Co-operative
Beverley	Thomas Brennan	12,778	27.1	2	Constituency
Bexley	Ashley Bramall	27,430	48.6	2	Constituency
Billericay	Brian Ralph Clapham	20,613	43.4	2	Co-operative
Bilston	Will Nally	31,381	61.9	1	Co-operative
Birkenhead	Percy Collick	29,014	55.0	1	Locomotive Engineers
Birmingham Aston	Woodrow Wyatt	27,899	62.6	1	Constituency
Birmingham Edgbaston	William Pringle	16,373	35.7	2	Constituency
Birmingham Erdington	Julius Silverman	29,561	53.1	1	Constituency
Birmingham Hall Green	Thomas Crehan	20,874	43.3	2	Constituency
Birmingham Handsworth	Richard William Evely	18,494	40.5	2	Constituency
Birmingham King's Norton	Denis Howell	22,325	42.3	2	Constituency
Birmingham Ladywood	Victor Yates	24,088	59.6	1	Constituency
Birmingham Northfield	Donald Chapman	26,580	52.8	1	Constituency
Birmingham Perry Barr	Cecil Poole	23,322	58.1	1	Railwaymen
Birmingham Small Heath	Fred Longden	31,079	63.4	1	Co-operative
Birmingham Sparkbrook	Percy Shurmer	24,184	61.3	1	Constituency
Birmingham Stechford	Roy Jenkins	34,355	59.5	1	Constituency
Birmingham Yardley	Henry Usborne	22,800	53.2	1	Constituency
Bishop Auckland	Hugh Dalton	25,881	60.5	1	Constituency
Blackburn East	Barbara Castle	19,661	53.6	1	Constituency
Blackburn West	Roland Casasola	16,996	46.3	2	Foundry Workers
Blackpool North	Samuel Victor Hyde-Price	12,727	29.8	2	Constituency
Blackpool South	Kenneth Lomas	13,750	32.8	2	Constituency
Blaydon	William Whiteley	28,337	68.2	1	Mineworkers
Blyth	Alfred Robens	39,823	73.7	1	Shop Workers
Bodmin	William Royle	9,244	23.5	3	Constituency
Bolsover	Harold Neal	33,661	79.9	1	Mineworkers
Bolton East	Alfred Booth	26,751	49.7	2	Constituency
Bolton West	John Lewis	23,523	47.2	2	Constituency
Bootle	John Kinley	26,597	52.7	1	Constituency
Bosworth	Arthur Allen	30,767	57.1	1	Boot & Shoe
Bothwell	John Timmons	26,529	56.3	1	Mineworkers
Bournemouth East and Christchurch	Hallam Barnes	11,550	25.1	2	Constituency
Bournemouth West	Judith Hart	17,532	34.5	2	Constituency
Bradford Central	Maurice Webb	25,215	60.7	1	Constituency
Bradford East	Frank McLeavy	28,796	62.9	1	Constituency
Bradford North	Edward Parris	20,647	45.7	2	Constituency
Bradford South	George Craddock	21,364	47.2	1	Shop Workers
Brecon and Radnor	Tudor Watkins	24,572	52.2	1	Constituency
Brentford and Chiswick	Leonard Lewis	18,102	48.0	2	Constituency
Bridgwater	Norman Carr	19,656	43.7	1	Co-operative
Bridlington	Gerard McQuade	12,931	25.8	2	Constituency
Brierley Hill	Charles Simmons	25,510	52.4	1	General & Municipal Workers
Brigg	Lance Mallalieu	31,151	57.5	1	Constituency
Brighouse and Spenborough	John Edwards	26,105	52.3	1	Constituency
Brighton Kemptown	Lewis Cohen	20,726	44.4	2	Constituency
Brighton Pavilion	Elisabeth Littlejohn	13,410	31.5	2	Constituency
Bristol Central	Stan Awbery	26,091	62.4	1	Constituency
Bristol North East	Will Coldrick	21,910	53.0	1	Co-operative
Bristol North West	Claud Morris	24,553	46.4	2	Constituency
Bristol South	William Wilkins	24,444	63.3	1	Typographers
Bristol South East	Tony Benn	30,811	65.0	1	Constituency
Bristol West	Harold Lawrance	11,716	28.8	2	Constituency
Brixton	Marcus Lipton	24,776	56.1	1	Constituency
Bromley	Thomas McKitterick	13,585	34.6	2	Constituency
Bromsgrove	Donald Chesworth	24,083	47.4	2	Constituency
Broxtowe	Seymour Cocks	35,317	72.7	1	Constituency
Buckingham	Aidan Crawley	22,634	49.9	2	Constituency
Burnley	Wilfrid Burke	31,261	56.5	1	Shop Workers
Burton	John Stonehouse	24,151	49.3	2	Constituency
Bury and Radcliffe	Lewis Wright	28,058	48.4	2	Textile Factory Workers
Bury St Edmunds	Neville Stanley	20,690	45.6	2	Constituency
Bute and North Ayrshire	Dickson Mabon	12,492	35.8	2	Constituency
Caernarfon	Goronwy Roberts	22,375	62.4	1	Constituency
Caerphilly	Ness Edwards	30,523	77.2	1	Mineworkers
Caithness and Sutherland	Richard Murray	6,799	34.1	2	Constituency
Cambridge	Arthur Symonds	20,893	41.2	2	Constituency
Cambridgeshire	Henry Walston	21,558	46.2	2	Constituency
Cannock	Jennie Lee	32,379	66.9	1	Constituency
Canterbury	John A. E. Jones	14,543	31.0	2	Constituency
Cardiff North	John Evans	22,600	43.5	2	Co-operative
Cardiff South East	James Callaghan	28,112	54.4	1	Constituency
Cardiff West	George Thomas	28,995	55.1	1	Constituency
Carlisle	Alex Hargreaves	19,648	46.8	1	Constituency
Carlton	Florence Paton	20,685	42.2	2	Constituency
Carmarthen	David Owen	25,165	49.5	2	Locomotive Engineers
Carshalton	Clifford Davies	22,928	41.3	2	Constituency
Central Ayrshire	Archibald Manuel	21,003	52.1	1	Constituency
Central Norfolk	John Lambley	17,270	44.1	2	Agricultural Workers
Cardigan	Brynmor Williams	9,697	32.7	2	Constituency
Cheadle	Hatton Jones	12,910	25.0	2	Constituency
Chelmsford	James Haworth	23,775	45.0	2	Constituency
Chelsea	Frederick Lionel Tonge	10,784	30.1	2	Constituency
Cheltenham	James Finnigan	17,777	42.9	2	Electrical
Chertsey	Dennis Gordon	14,849	38.7	2	Constituency
City of Chester	John Hughes	18,958	41.5	2	Constituency
Chesterfield	George Benson	34,753	63.7	1	Constituency
Chester-le-Street	Patrick Bartley	35,511	77.0	1	Mineworkers
Chichester	David George Packham	13,971	30.3	2	Constituency
Chippenham	Dengar Evans	17,723	44.0	2	Constituency
Chislehurst	George Wallace	30,699	49.2	2	Constituency
Chorley	Clifford Kenyon	24,771	50.6	1	Constituency
Cirencester and Tewkesbury	Albert Sumbler	18,353	40.5	2	Engineers
Cities of London and Westminster	Hugh Sutherland	17,527	33.2	2	Constituency
Clackmannan and East Stirlingshire	Arthur Woodburn	25,231	58.7	1	Constituency
Clapham	Charles Gibson	25,053	51.3	2	Constituency
Cleveland	George Willey	31,237	54.8	1	General & Municipal Workers
Clitheroe	Harold Bradley	18,582	44.7	2	Textile Factory Workers
Coatbridge and Airdrie	Jean Mann	24,159	57.4	1	Constituency
Colchester	Xenia Field	21,217	45.8	2	Constituency
Colne Valley	Glenvil Hall	26,455	52.2	1	Constituency
Consett	James Glanville	35,705	69.2	1	Mineworkers
Conway	Elwyn Jones	16,532	41.9	2	Constituency
Coventry East	Richard Crossman	32,108	62.3	1	Constituency
Coventry North	Maurice Edelman	29,826	59.6	1	Constituency
Coventry South	Elaine Burton	29,271	55.2	1	Constituency
Crewe	Scholefield Allen	28,488	52.2	1	Constituency
Crosby	Edith Edwards	10,251	29.1	2	Constituency
Croydon East	Alexander Bain	22,615	41.2	2	Constituency
Croydon North	Reg Prentice	19,738	36.6	2	Constituency
Croydon West	Gerald Gardiner	21,534	47.8	2	Constituency
Dagenham	John Parker	44,908	76.1	1	Constituency
Darlington	David Hardman	26,045	49.2	2	Constituency
Dartford	Norman Dodds	40,094	59.1	1	Co-operative
Darwen	Ronald Haines	14,605	39.9	2	Constituency
Dearne Valley	Wilfred Paling	39,782	79.6	1	Mineworkers
Denbigh	Idwal Jones	12,354	27.8	2	Constituency
Deptford	Leslie Plummer	28,878	65.2	1	Constituency
Derby North	Clifford Wilcock	22,390	57.1	1	Constituency
Derby South	Philip Noel-Baker	27,333	62.6	1	Constituency
Devizes	Wilfrid Edward Cave	18,742	48.0	2	Constituency
Dewsbury	William Paling	28,650	53.3	1	Mineworkers
Don Valley	Thomas Williams	39,687	74.1	1	Mineworkers
Doncaster	Ray Gunter	22,938	48.3	2	Constituency
Dorking	Julian Richard	12,664	34.2	2	Constituency
Dover	Will Owen	24,995	46.7	2	Co-operative
Droylsden	William Williams	26,829	51.8	1	Post Office Workers
Dudley	George Wigg	34,376	58.4	1	Constituency
Dulwich	Wilfrid Vernon	25,888	46.4	2	Constituency
Dumfriesshire	George Douglas	16,669	38.7	2	Post Office Workers
Dundee East	Thomas Cook	26,668	53.8	1	Electrical
Dundee West	John Strachey	29,020	51.6	1	Constituency
Dunfermline Burghs	James Clunie	24,457	61.1	1	Constituency
Durham	Charles Grey	35,597	67.1	1	Mineworkers
Ealing North	James Hindle Hudson	25,698	50.1	1	Co-operative
Ealing South	David Allen	17,204	37.6	2	Constituency
Easington	Manny Shinwell	37,899	80.8	1	Constituency
East Aberdeenshire	Alexander Whipp	11,730	32.0	2	Constituency
East Dunbartonshire	Cyril Bence	26,678	51.2	1	Engineers
East Fife	John McGowan	11,844	29.4	2	Constituency
East Grinstead	Herbert Atkinson	14,271	26.2	2	Constituency
East Ham North	Percy Daines	21,444	60.4	1	Co-operative
East Ham South	Alfred Barnes	23,704	64.9	1	Co-operative
East Renfrewshire	David Phillips	16,588	34.2	2	Constituency
East Surrey	Nathan Whine	14,056	27.0	2	Constituency
Eastbourne	Christopher Attlee	19,217	32.9	2	Constituency
Ebbw Vale	Aneurin Bevan	28,283	80.7	1	Mineworkers
Eccles	William Proctor	27,941	52.5	1	Railwaymen
Edinburgh Central	Thomas Oswald	18,429	52.2	1	Constituency
Edinburgh East	John Wheatley	25,201	54.1	1	Constituency
Edinburgh Leith	James Hoy	19,308	50.1	1	Constituency
Edinburgh North	George Willis	14,604	41.2	2	Constituency
Edinburgh Pentlands	David Connell	20,405	42.3	2	Shop Workers
Edinburgh South	James Forsyth	10,030	27.4	2	Constituency
Edinburgh West	Harry Wilson	15,607	34.1	2	Constituency
Edmonton	Austen Albu	36,023	58.4	1	Engineers
Enfield East	Ernest Davies	25,298	63.4	1	Constituency
Enfield Southgate	Vera Dart	10,889	22.5	2	Constituency
Enfield West	Kythe Caroline Hendy	12,126	35.2	2	Constituency
Epping	Leah Manning	22,598	45.2	2	Constituency
Epsom	Frank Martin Hardie	16,584	31.3	2	Constituency
Esher	Percy McNally	15,334	28.6	2	Engineers
Eton and Slough	Fenner Brockway	22,732	55.0	1	Constituency
Exeter	Edward Bishop	18,576	40.7	2	Shipbuilding Draughtsmen
Eye	Harold Falconer	11,340	23.3	3	Constituency
Falmouth and Camborne	Harold Hayman	20,850	46.3	1	Constituency
Farnham	Charles Leonard James	14,041	36.7	2	Constituency
Farnworth	George Tomlinson	26,297	59.2	1	Textile Factory Workers
Faversham	Percy Wells	24,884	50.6	1	Constituency
Finchley	Jack Ashley	20,520	33.8	2	Constituency
Flint East	Eirene White	23,959	53.8	1	Constituency
Flint West	David Leadbeater	15,118	39.2	2	Constituency
Folkestone and Hythe	Rhys Jones	13,968	35.1	2	Constituency
Fulham East	Michael Stewart	20,279	53.2	1	Constituency
Fulham West	Edith Summerskill	20,290	51.7	1	Constituency
Fylde North	John Morris	11,284	30.7	2	Constituency
Fylde South	Lewis Holden Burgess	12,408	25.8	2	Constituency
Gainsborough	Gordon Hawkins	16,074	39.6	2	Constituency
Galloway	Alan Thompson	6,949	26.3	2	Constituency
Gateshead East	Arthur Moody	19,525	57.7	1	Woodworkers
Gateshead West	John Hall	20,790	63.8	1	General & Municipal Workers
Gillingham	Edward Redhead	18,489	46.3	2	Constituency
Glasgow Bridgeton	James Carmichael	21,307	63.6	1	Constituency
Glasgow Camlachie	William Reid	20,994	51.3	1	Constituency
Glasgow Cathcart	Agnes Patrick	10,912	29.5	2	Constituency
Glasgow Central	James McInnes	15,757	58.2	1	Constituency
Glasgow Gorbals	Alice Cullen	25,288	61.8	1	Constituency
Glasgow Govan	John Davis	20,695	49.7	2	Constituency
Glasgow Hillhead	Hyman Shapiro	13,359	35.1	2	Constituency
Glasgow Kelvingrove	John Williams	14,406	47.6	2	Constituency
Glasgow Maryhill	William Hannan	22,912	63.0	1	Constituency
Glasgow Pollok	John Smith Clarke	23,136	44.6	2	Constituency
Glasgow Scotstoun	John Robertson	20,872	49.3	2	Engineers
Glasgow Shettleston	John McGovern	25,359	59.8	1	Constituency
Glasgow Springburn	John Forman	27,749	62.4	1	Co-operative
Glasgow Tradeston	John Rankin	29,966	63.1	1	Co-operative
Glasgow Woodside	Richard McCutcheon	16,210	46.6	2	Co-operative
Gloucester	Moss Turner-Samuels	21,097	48.8	1	Constituency
Goole	George Jeger	26,088	60.4	1	Constituency
Gosport and Fareham	Norman Francis Stogdon	20,303	39.8	2	Constituency
Gower	David Grenfell	32,661	75.9	1	Mineworkers
Grantham	Albert Edward Millett	18,540	38.9	2	Constituency
Gravesend	Richard Acland	30,055	55.3	1	Constituency
Great Yarmouth	Ernest Kinghorn	21,165	48.8	2	Constituency
Greenock	Hector McNeil	23,452	57.1	1	Constituency
Greenwich	Joseph Reeves	30,326	60.4	1	Royal Arsenal Co-op
Grimsby	Kenneth Younger	29,462	56.6	1	Constituency
Guildford	Vernon Wilkinson	16,068	36.8	2	Constituency
Hackney North and Stoke Newington	David Weitzman	37,406	59.1	1	Constituency
Hackney South	Herbert Butler	39,271	66.5	1	Constituency
Halifax	Dryden Brook	30,433	50.6	1	Constituency
Haltemprice	Charles Bridges	19,584	41.9	2	Railwaymen
Hamilton	Tom Fraser	28,591	68.7	1	Mineworkers
Hammersmith North	Frank Tomney	22,709	66.1	1	Constituency
Hammersmith South	Thomas Williams	19,273	54.6	1	Co-operative
Hampstead	Arthur Richardson	31,346	55.1	1	Constituency
Harborough	Christopher Boyd	21,648	38.5	2	Constituency
Harrogate	Christopher William Sewell	12,021	29.4	2	Constituency
Harrow Central	Joan Thompson	17,540	40.7	2	Constituency
Harrow East	Robert Rees	23,725	44.0	2	Constituency
Harrow West	Leslie Littlewood	12,802	32.5	2	Constituency
Harwich	Morris Janis	18,244	41.1	2	Constituency
Hastings	Catherine Williamson	19,621	36.3	2	Constituency
Hayes and Harlington	Walter Ayles	23,823	64.8	1	Engineers
Hemel Hempstead	Norman MacKenzie	18,220	41.6	2	Constituency
Hemsworth	Horace Holmes	47,402	82.7	1	Mineworkers
Hendon North	Finlay Rea	20,738	43.8	2	Constituency
Hendon South	Bernard Homa	16,124	34.1	2	Constituency
Henley	Constantine Gallop	17,090	42.0	2	Constituency
Hereford	William Pigott	13,396	38.7	2	Constituency
Hertford	Richard Marsh	23,708	43.7	2	Co-operative
Heston and Isleworth	Peter Merriton	29,944	45.8	2	Constituency
Hexham	Thomas MacDonald	15,768	40.4	2	Constituency
Heywood and Royton	Charles Hurley	24,083	46.1	2	Electrical
High Peak	Wilfred McCormack Halsall	18,127	41.7	2	Constituency
Hitchin	Peter Benenson	24,941	47.4	2	Constituency
Holborn and St Pancras South	Santo Jeger	20,332	50.2	1	Constituency
Holland-with-Boston	Janet Walters	22,994	42.0	2	Constituency
Honiton	Norman Stevens	9,369	20.3	3	Constituency
Horncastle	Francis Clark	11,143	33.6	2	Constituency
Hornchurch	Geoffrey Bing	30,101	47.4	1	Constituency
Hornsey	Reginald Pestell	25,643	41.3	2	Constituency
Horsham	Russell Kerr	12,803	33.7	2	Constituency
Houghton-le-Spring	Billy Blyton	37,718	75.8	1	Mineworkers
Hove	Alfred Bermel	12,934	25.8	2	Constituency
Huddersfield East	Joseph Mallalieu	22,368	55.7	1	Constituency
Huddersfield West	Harold William Bolt	17,066	41.5	2	Constituency
Huntingdonshire	Francis Robert Macdonald	15,487	42.6	2	Constituency
Huyton	Harold Wilson	23,582	51.3	1	Constituency
Ilford North	Mabel Ridealgh	21,865	38.0	2	Co-operative
Ilford South	James Ranger	24,938	45.3	2	Constituency
Ilkeston	George Oliver	40,671	67.4	1	Constituency
Ince	Tom Brown	32,148	72.3	1	Mineworkers
Inverness	Alexander MacNair	12,361	35.5	2	Constituency
Ipswich	Richard Stokes	33,463	53.4	1	Constituency
Isle of Ely	Alfred Gray	19,915	43.1	2	Constituency
Isle of Thanet	Otto Shaw	20,892	38.4	2	Constituency
Isle of Wight	Sydney Conbeer	20,712	38.2	2	Constituency
Islington East	Eric Fletcher	23,896	59.9	1	Constituency
Islington North	Wilfred Fienburgh	27,406	59.6	1	Constituency
Islington South West	Albert Evans	31,637	68.2	1	Constituency
Jarrow	Ernest Fernyhough	35,963	66.2	1	Shop Workers
Keighley	Charles Hobson	23,743	52.7	1	Engineers
Kensington North	George Rogers	22,686	53.0	1	Constituency
Kensington South	Michael Parker	8,894	20.5	2	Constituency
Kettering	Dick Mitchison	32,604	55.8	1	Constituency
Kidderminster	Jack Williams	20,325	44.4	2	Constituency
Kilmarnock	Willie Ross	24,664	60.7	1	Constituency
King's Lynn	Frederick Wise	21,017	48.9	2	Constituency
Kingston upon Hull Central	Mark Hewitson	29,674	61.7	1	General & Municipal Workers
Kingston upon Hull East	Harry Pursey	27,892	57.1	1	Constituency
Kingston upon Hull North	John Foord	20,025	47.0	2	Constituency
Kingston-upon-Thames	Ray Hesketh	22,117	36.5	2	Constituency
Kinross and West Perthshire	Isobel McGregor	6,124	23.8	2	Constituency
Kirkcaldy Burghs	Thomas Hubbard	26,885	60.6	1	Mineworkers
Knutsford	Cyril Hamnett	14,640	30.0	2	Constituency
Lanark	William Taylor	19,674	47.8	2	Constituency
Lancaster	Dodo Lees	18,099	46.8	2	Constituency
Leeds Central	George Porter	23,967	62.4	1	Woodworkers
Leeds North	Philip Taylor	17,249	36.3	2	Constituency
Leeds North East	Alice Bacon	22,402	58.3	1	Constituency
Leeds North West	Marian Veitch	15,490	37.5	2	Constituency
Leeds South	Hugh Gaitskell	30,712	65.1	1	Constituency
Leeds South East	James Milner	24,929	60.5	1	Constituency
Leeds West	Charles Pannell	22,357	54.1	1	Engineers
Leek	Harold Davies	29,502	51.7	1	Constituency
Leicester North East	Lynn Ungoed-Thomas	26,209	60.0	1	Constituency
Leicester North West	Barnett Janner	25,184	56.8	1	Constituency
Leicester South East	Ewart Taylor	16,225	40.5	2	Co-operative
Leicester South West	Herbert Bowden	24,340	58.4	1	Constituency
Leigh	Harold Boardman	33,881	63.4	1	Shop Workers
Leominster	Edmund Jones	9,939	33.3	2	Constituency
Lewes	Albert William Briggs	17,082	33.2	2	Constituency
Lewisham North	Trevor Williams	21,243	46.5	2	Constituency
Lewisham South	Herbert Morrison	27,559	56.6	1	Constituency
Lewisham West	Arthur Skeffington	22,813	47.3	2	Constituency
Leyton	Reginald Sorensen	37,728	57.8	1	Constituency
Lichfield and Tamworth	Julian Snow	28,826	52.6	1	Constituency
Lincoln	Geoffrey de Freitas	23,400	54.1	1	Constituency
Liverpool Edge Hill	Arthur Irvine	22,906	53.9	1	Constituency
Liverpool Exchange	Bessie Braddock	19,887	60.4	1	Constituency
Liverpool Garston	Alf Morris	19,025	34.8	2	Constituency
Liverpool Kirkdale	William Keenan	19,637	51.0	1	Constituency
Liverpool Scotland	David Logan	28,558	68.2	1	Constituency
Liverpool Toxteth	William Lawn	19,620	45.8	2	Co-operative
Liverpool Walton	Ian Isidore Levin	24,262	46.4	2	Constituency
Liverpool Wavertree	William Hamling	19,702	41.2	2	Constituency
Liverpool West Derby	Lewis Edwards	25,734	48.4	2	Constituency
Llanelly	Jim Griffiths	39,731	72.5	1	Mineworkers
Loughborough	Mont Follick	25,894	57.0	1	Constituency
Louth	Henry Dyer	15,819	39.3	2	Constituency
Lowestoft	Edward Evans	23,591	50.9	1	Constituency
Ludlow	Reginald Barker	14,596	39.8	2	Constituency
Luton	William Warbey	23,842	47.3	2	Constituency
Macclesfield	Agnes Taylor	20,428	41.0	2	Constituency
Maidstone	Henry Albert	21,159	43.4	2	Constituency
Maldon	Tom Driberg	22,756	50.8	1	Constituency
Manchester Ardwick	Leslie Lever	22,150	55.5	1	Constituency
Manchester Blackley	John Diamond	22,804	44.6	2	Constituency
Manchester Cheetham	Harold Lever	22,810	62.3	1	Constituency
Manchester Clayton	Harry Thorneycroft	27,985	63.5	1	Constituency
Manchester Exchange	William Griffiths	18,475	55.4	1	Constituency
Manchester Gorton	William Oldfield	28,763	58.0	1	Constituency
Manchester Moss Side	Frank Allaun	16,819	37.8	2	Constituency
Manchester Withington	James Clough	14,604	35.3	2	Constituency
Manchester Wythenshawe	Lewis Hanbidge	22,055	43.5	2	Constituency
Mansfield	Bernard Taylor	37,097	69.9	1	Mineworkers
Melton	Kenneth Urwin	22,308	43.7	2	Constituency
Merioneth	Thomas Jones	10,505	43.0	1	Constituency
Merthyr Tydfil	S. O. Davies	28,841	79.6	1	Mineworkers
Merton and Morden	Arthur Palmer	22,086	45.5	2	Co-operative
Mid Bedfordshire	Addy Taylor	17,818	41.1	2	Constituency
Middlesbrough East	Hilary Marquand	31,277	66.5	1	Constituency
Middlesbrough West	David Dunwoodie	22,525	47.8	2	Co-operative
Middleton and Prestwich	Albert Knight	16,323	33.9	2	Constituency
Midlothian and Peebles	David Pryde	29,271	55.3	1	Mineworkers
Mitcham	Harry Randall	28,187	45.3	2	Post Office Workers
Monmouth	Jo Richardson	17,952	44.4	2	Constituency
Montgomeryshire	David Caradog Jones	7,854	31.5	2	Constituency
Moray and Nairn	David Hutchinson	10,487	39.8	2	Constituency
Morecambe and Lonsdale	Ernest Gardner	13,732	30.5	2	Constituency
Morpeth	Robert Taylor	27,718	71.9	1	Mineworkers
Motherwell	Alexander Anderson	23,641	57.3	1	Constituency
Neath	D. J. Williams	34,496	76.9	1	Mineworkers
Nelson and Colne	Sydney Silverman	25,611	54.7	1	Constituency
Newark	George Deer	30,476	57.2	1	Constituency
Newbury	Colin Jackson	13,507	40.2	2	Constituency
Newcastle-under-Lyme	Stephen Swingler	30,814	58.0	1	Constituency
Newcastle upon Tyne Central	Ted Shore	25,637	64.1	1	Constituency
Newcastle upon Tyne East	Arthur Blenkinsop	25,621	52.9	1	Constituency
Newcastle upon Tyne North	Ivan Geffen	17,005	36.3	2	Constituency
Newcastle upon Tyne West	Ernest Popplewell	31,765	57.9	1	Railwaymen
New Forest	Aubrey White	17,537	35.7	2	Constituency
Newport	Peter Freeman	32,883	52.8	1	Constituency
Newton	Frederick Lee	31,374	58.3	1	Engineers
Normanton	Albert Roberts	31,052	73.5	1	Mineworkers
Northampton	Reginald Paget	35,038	53.7	1	Constituency
North Angus and Mearns	John Mackie	10,356	35.9	2	Constituency
North Cornwall	William Carlo Ferman	6,049	16.4	3	Constituency
North Devon	William Wilkey	10,632	28.2	2	Constituency
North Dorset	J. R. Tudor Griffith	2,946	08.0	3	Constituency
North East Derbyshire	Henry White	33,376	66.7	1	Mineworkers
North Lanarkshire	Peggy Herbison	22,304	58.2	1	Constituency
North Norfolk	Edwin Gooch	21,067	50.3	1	Agricultural Workers
North West Durham	James Murray	30,417	68.7	1	Mineworkers
Northwich	Robert Patrick Walsh	22,300	43.2	2	Constituency
Norwich North	John Paton	22,880	62.7	1	Constituency
Norwich South	Mabel Tylecote	17,234	47.5	2	Constituency
Norwood	Ronald Chamberlain	24,251	47.1	2	Constituency
Nottingham Central	Ian Winterbottom	20,517	50.2	1	Constituency
Nottingham East	James Harrison	20,865	47.8	1	Railwaymen
Nottingham North West	Tom O'Brien	32,694	64.9	1	Constituency
Nottingham South	Norman Smith	19,844	50.6	1	Co-operative
Nuneaton	Frank Bowles	35,651	60.0	1	Constituency
Ogmore	Walter Padley	37,022	76.9	1	Shop Workers
Oldbury and Halesowen	Arthur Moyle	30,610	55.7	1	Public Employees
Oldham East	James Avery Joyce	22,564	47.8	2	Constituency
Oldham West	Leslie Hale	23,712	50.4	1	Constituency
Orkney and Zetland	Magnus Fairnie	3,335	16.2	3	Constituency
Ormskirk	Ernest Kavanagh	12,908	32.6	2	Constituency
Orpington	David Vaughan Williams	16,241	37.4	2	Constituency
Oswestry	Arthur George Wait	14,471	37.8	2	Constituency
Oxford	George Elvin	25,427	44.0	2	Cinema Technicians
Paddington North	Bill Field	19,923	55.7	1	Constituency
Paddington South	Charles Wegg-Prosser	13,932	40.2	2	Constituency
Paisley	Douglas Johnston	29,570	55.4	1	Constituency
Peckham	Freda Corbet	33,702	69.8	1	Constituency
Pembrokeshire	Desmond Donnelly	25,994	48.4	1	Constituency
Penistone	Henry McGhee	36,169	64.2	1	Constituency
Penrith and the Border	John Rafferty	10,759	25.0	2	Constituency
Perth and East Perthshire	Neil McBride	11,167	25.7	2	Constituency
Peterborough	Albert Farrer	24,163	47.3	2	Constituency
Petersfield	Edward Preidel	15,770	31.1	2	Constituency
Plymouth Devonport	Michael Foot	32,158	51.9	1	Constituency
Plymouth Sutton	Lucy Middleton	28,198	49.4	2	Constituency
Pontefract	George Sylvester	35,280	76.2	1	Mineworkers
Pontypool	Granville West	29,553	75.7	1	Constituency
Pontypridd	Arthur Pearson	32,586	72.3	1	Constituency
Poole	Leonard Joseph Matchan	18,346	36.4	2	Constituency
Poplar	Charles Key	31,377	82.0	1	Constituency
Portsmouth Langstone	John O'Neill Ryan	18,647	37.0	2	Constituency
Portsmouth South	Douglas Wallace	17,350	36.2	2	Constituency
Portsmouth West	Alma Birk	24,115	48.7	2	Constituency
Preston North	Thomas Hourigan	22,490	48.8	2	Public Employees
Preston South	Edward Shackleton	22,760	50.0	1	Constituency
Pudsey	Geoffrey Collings	20,782	46.3	2	Constituency
Putney	Eric Hutchison	23,489	44.2	2	Co-operative
Reading North	Kim Mackay	17,076	49.6	2	Constituency
Reading South	Ian Mikardo	18,570	51.4	1	Constituency
Reigate	Charles Garnsworthy	14,287	33.1	2	Co-operative
Rhondda East	William Mainwaring	27,958	81.2	1	Mineworkers
Rhondda West	Iorwerth Thomas	26,123	81.1	1	Mineworkers
Richmond (Yorks)	Richard Hoyle	10,915	29.4	2	Constituency
Richmond upon Thames	Freda White	16,707	31.9	2	Constituency
Ripon	Sydney Andrews	10,627	31.6	2	Constituency
Rochdale	Joseph Hale	27,343	49.6	2	Engineers
Rochester and Chatham	Arthur Bottomley	26,390	50.8	1	Public Employees
Romford	Arthur Creech Jones	31,822	49.0	2	Constituency
Ross and Cromarty	Alastair Reed	6,104	35.8	2	Constituency
Rossendale	Tony Greenwood	24,814	51.7	1	Constituency
Rother Valley	David Griffiths	41,990	75.7	1	Mineworkers
Rotherham	Jack Jones	31,124	65.6	1	Iron & Steel
Rowley Regis and Tipton	Arthur Henderson	32,579	66.7	1	Constituency
Roxburgh and Selkirk	Thomas White	8,395	20.8	2	Constituency
Rugby	James Johnson	19,995	50.3	1	Constituency
Ruislip-Northwood	Thomas Parker	14,491	36.4	2	Co-operative
Runcorn	John Hindle	14,980	37.6	2	Constituency
Rushcliffe	Ron Ledger	22,506	42.1	2	Constituency
Rutherglen	Gilbert McAllister	19,202	49.6	2	Constituency
Rutland and Stamford	Tom Bradley	15,127	45.9	2	Constituency
Saffron Walden	Reg Groves	15,245	38.5	2	Constituency
St Albans	John McKnight	23,911	45.5	2	Constituency
St Helens	Hartley Shawcross	37,688	63.3	1	Constituency
St Ives	Arthur Maddison	11,216	31.8	2	Co-operative
St Marylebone	William Balfour	13,964	32.7	2	Constituency
St Pancras North	Kenneth Robinson	31,191	60.5	1	Constituency
Salford East	Edward Hardy	27,729	57.0	1	Constituency
Salford West	Charles Royle	27,542	53.4	1	Constituency
Salisbury	Roger Thomas	16,386	42.9	2	Constituency
Scarborough and Whitby	Henry Brinton	16,621	33.5	2	Constituency
Sedgefield	Joseph Slater	28,219	62.3	1	Mineworkers
Sevenoaks	John Powrie	18,823	39.6	2	Constituency
Sheffield Attercliffe	John Hynd	29,958	71.1	1	Railwaymen
Sheffield Brightside	Richard Winterbottom	31,519	69.9	1	Shop Workers
Sheffield Hallam	Frederick Beaton	11,988	29.2	2	Constituency
Sheffield Heeley	Arnold Jennings	17,729	39.0	2	Constituency
Sheffield Hillsborough	George Darling	28,274	59.0	1	Co-operative
Sheffield Neepsend	Frank Soskice	28,880	73.1	1	Constituency
Sheffield Park	Fred Mulley	30,842	69.2	1	Clerical Workers
Shipley	Thomas Roberts	18,893	44.3	2	Constituency
Shoreditch and Finsbury	Ernest Thurtle	30,162	72.6	1	Constituency
Shrewsbury	Robert Cant	14,735	40.7	2	Constituency
Skipton	Edgar Hewitt	18,064	41.0	2	Constituency
Smethwick	Patrick Gordon Walker	27,739	60.6	1	Constituency
Solihull	John Johnson	11,747	29.7	2	Constituency
Somerset North	Robert Hurst	24,917	47.6	2	Constituency
South Angus	James Harold	10,028	29.1	2	Constituency
South Ayrshire	Emrys Hughes	22,576	60.5	1	Constituency
South Bedfordshire	Edward Moeran	22,068	49.1	2	Constituency
South Buckinghamshire	Cyril Dee	14,170	31.4	2	Shipbuilding Draughtsmen
South Dorset	Frederick Newman Stacey	18,244	40.6	2	Constituency
South East Derbyshire	Arthur Champion	33,020	52.7	1	Railwaymen
South Gloucestershire	Anthony Crosland	27,808	55.3	1	Constituency
South Norfolk	Lynton Scutts	16,371	45.5	2	Constituency
South Northamptonshire	Dennis Webb	18,434	46.4	2	Constituency
South Shields	Chuter Ede	33,633	56.0	1	Constituency
South West Hertfordshire	Lawrence Allaker	18,991	41.3	2	Constituency
South West Norfolk	Sidney Dye	16,528	49.3	2	Constituency
South Worcestershire	Patrick Tennyson-Hopwood	14,434	34.6	2	Constituency
Southall	George Pargiter	29,123	57.9	1	Engineers
Southampton Itchen	Ralph Morley	30,330	54.1	1	Constituency
Southampton Test	Horace King	26,430	50.4	1	Constituency
Southend East	Leslie Merrion	19,478	44.7	2	Building Workers
Southend West	Henry Lyall	17,352	30.9	2	Engineers
Southport	Owen Ellis	12,535	24.8	2	Constituency
Southwark	George Isaacs	36,586	72.3	1	Printers
Sowerby	Douglas Houghton	22,766	46.1	1	Constituency
Spelthorne	Albert Hunter	29,908	49.1	2	Shop Workers
Stafford and Stone	Ghriam Passmore Grant	19,749	43.4	2	Constituency
Stalybridge and Hyde	Fred Blackburn	25,402	50.3	1	Constituency
Stepney	Walter Edwards	35,849	76.5	1	Constituency
Stirling and Falkirk	Malcolm MacPherson	24,421	52.3	1	Constituency
Stirlingshire West	Alfred Balfour	20,893	56.0	1	Constituency
Stockport North	John Owen	20,893	44.9	2	Engineers
Stockport South	Frank Bibby	18,675	45.8	2	Constituency
Stockton-on-Tees	George Chetwynd	24,558	55.7	1	Constituency
Stoke-on-Trent Central	Barnett Stross	34,260	64.6	1	Constituency
Stoke-on-Trent North	Albert Davies	36,692	71.4	1	Constituency
Stoke-on-Trent South	Ellis Smith	35,261	65.8	1	Patternmakers
Stratford-on-Avon	Henry Hilditch	13,246	35.5	2	Constituency
Streatham	Norman John Smart	14,804	32.8	2	Constituency
Stretford	Charles Mapp	25,694	42.0	2	Constituency
Stroud and Thornbury	Ben Parkin	28,558	48.7	2	Constituency
Sudbury and Woodbridge	Dick Lewis	21,310	43.9	2	Co-operative
Sunderland North	Fred Willey	23,792	54.0	1	Constituency
Sunderland South	Richard Ewart	27,257	50.3	1	Constituency
Sutton and Cheam	Eric Hurst	18,202	37.2	2	Constituency
Sutton Coldfield	David Allen	20,893	36.3	2	Constituency
Swansea East	David Mort	32,790	73.6	1	Iron & Steel
Swansea West	Percy Morris	26,061	52.2	1	Constituency
Swindon	Thomas Reid	23,980	57.0	1	Constituency
Taunton	Victor Collins	20,845	45.6	2	Constituency
Tavistock	Frank Harcourt-Munning	12,833	36.1	2	Constituency
The Hartlepools	D. T. Jones	27,147	52.6	1	Railwaymen
The Wrekin	Ivor Owen Thomas	20,109	52.4	1	Railwaymen
Thirsk and Malton	Arnold John Parkinson	10,692	27.7	2	Constituency
Thurrock	Hugh Delargy	28,851	65.6	1	Constituency
Tiverton	Patrick Duffy	14,084	36.5	2	Constituency
Tonbridge	Bernard Bagnari	21,109	40.2	2	Constituency
Torquay	Robert Briscoe	14,801	27.9	2	Constituency
Torrington	G. R. Sargeant	11,812	33.8	2	Constituency
Totnes	Charles O'Donnell	16,409	31.4	2	Constituency
Tottenham	Frederick Messer	33,312	62.4	1	Co-operative
Truro	John Newby	19,752	44.2	2	Constituency
Twickenham	Ethel Chipchase	23,871	37.9	2	Constituency
Tynemouth	Grace Colman	26,144	43.6	2	Constituency
Uxbridge	Frank Beswick	21,249	49.1	1	Co-operative
Vauxhall	George Strauss	24,217	65.8	1	Constituency
Wakefield	Arthur Greenwood	27,100	58.3	1	Constituency
Wallasey	Fred Jarvis	21,718	36.7	2	Constituency
Wallsend	John McKay	35,678	58.7	1	Mineworkers
Walsall	William Wells	33,556	52.3	1	Constituency
Walthamstow East	Harry Wallace	19,036	47.5	1	Post Office Workers
Walthamstow West	Clement Attlee	23,021	66.8	1	Constituency
Wandsworth Central	Richard Adams	28,844	51.0	1	Constituency
Warrington	Hyacinth Morgan	26,225	57.8	1	Constituency
Warwick and Leamington	William Wilson	18,479	39.5	2	Constituency
Watford	John Freeman	22,370	47.9	1	Constituency
Wednesbury	Stanley Evans	35,196	60.5	1	Constituency
Wellingborough	George Lindgren	24,113	52.4	1	Constituency
Wells	David Llewellyn	21,481	44.8	2	Mineworkers
Wembley North	Bernard Lewis	15,394	35.7	2	Co-operative
Wembley South	Douglas Clark	18,546	44.2	2	Constituency
West Aberdeenshire	Norman Hogg	7,278	22.6	2	Constituency
West Bromwich	John Dugdale	30,845	64.2	1	Constituency
West Derbyshire	Ronald Lewis	15,578	41.2	2	Constituency
West Dorset	Cambreth John Kane	14,308	39.7	2	Constituency
West Dunbartonshire	Tom Steele	21,799	51.3	1	Constituency
West Fife	Willie Hamilton	29,195	64.9	1	Constituency
West Gloucestershire	M. Philips Price	24,334	57.9	1	Constituency
West Ham North	Arthur Lewis	34,156	70.5	1	Constituency
West Ham South	Elwyn Jones	37,195	85.0	1	Constituency
West Lothian	John Taylor	28,906	60.5	1	Constituency
West Renfrewshire	Bruce Millan	18,493	46.3	2	Constituency
Westbury	Reginald Travess	17,623	39.2	2	Railwaymen
Western Isles	Malcolm Macmillan	8,039	48.8	1	Constituency
Westhoughton	Tom Price	29,319	61.1	1	Shop Workers
Westmorland	Paul Wilson	9,119	22.9	2	Constituency
Weston-super-Mare	Robert Andrews	15,942	34.3	2	Constituency
Whitehaven	Frank Anderson	23,190	59.2	1	Constituency
Widnes	James MacColl	21,688	54.2	1	Constituency
Wigan	Ronald Williams	34,530	66.9	1	Mineworkers
Willesden East	Maurice Orbach	26,695	51.9	1	Constituency
Willesden West	Samuel Viant	35,296	64.3	1	Woodworkers
Wimbledon	Charles Ford	21,242	33.5	2	Constituency
Winchester	Eric Charles Neate	24,418	43.5	2	Constituency
Windsor	Marjorie Nicholson	15,977	38.4	2	Constituency
Wirral	Reg Chrimes	17,392	34.8	2	Constituency
Woking	Eric Wolff	14,313	35.1	2	Constituency
Wokingham	Eric Hubble	10,606	29.9	2	Constituency
Wolverhampton North East	John Baird	30,643	62.3	1	Constituency
Wolverhampton South West	Annie Llewelyn-Davies	20,464	46.4	2	Constituency
Wood Green	William Irving	30,360	55.8	1	Co-operative
Woodford	William Aaron Archer	22,359	34.4	2	Constituency
Woolwich East	Christopher Mayhew	26,982	63.6	1	Constituency
Woolwich West	John Silkin	22,041	46.4	2	Constituency
Worcester	Leonard Pike	20,909	44.5	2	Constituency
Workington	Fred Peart	25,893	60.0	1	Constituency
Worthing	Gerry Reynolds	10,978	25.4	2	Constituency
Wrexham	Robert Richards	33,759	61.5	1	Constituency
Wycombe	John Haire	25,331	48.3	2	Constituency
Yeovil	Moss Murray	20,780	41.1	2	Constituency
York	Thomas Skeffington-Lodge	31,856	49.3	2	Constituency

=== By-elections, 1951-1955 ===
By-election	Candidate	Votes	%	Position	Sponsor
1952 Bournemouth East and Christchurch by-election	Robert Rees	8,498	23.4	2	
1952 Southport by-election	Alan Tillotson	11,310	28.5	2	
1952 Leeds South East by-election	Denis Healey	17,194	63.2	1	
1952 Dundee East by-election	George Thomson	22,161	56.6	1	Constituency
1952 Cleveland by-election	Arthur Palmer	25,985	54.1	1	Co-op
1952 Wycombe by-election	John Haire	24,650	48.0	2	Constituency
1952 Birmingham Small Heath by-election	William Wheeldon	19,491	67.0	1	Co-op
1952 Farnworth by-election	Ernest Thornton	21,834	59.9	1	Textile Factory Workers
1953 Canterbury by-election	John Jones	9,560	33.0	2	
1953 Isle of Thanet by-election	Frank Woodbridge	15,935	38.7	2	
1953 Barnsley by-election	Roy Mason	29,283	72.9	1	Mineworkers
1953 Stoke-on-Trent North by-election	Harriet Slater	23,103	75.5	1	Co-op
1953 Hayes and Harlington by-election	Arthur Skeffington	12,797	63.9	1	Constituency
1953 Sunderland South by-election	Alexander Whipp	21,939	46.1	2	
1953 Abingdon by-election	Ted Castle	17,126	39.7	2	
1953 Birmingham Edgbaston by-election	F. B. Watson	9,635	32.4	2	
1953 Broxtowe by-election	Will Warbey	27,356	74.1	1	Constituency
1953 Crosby by-election	Ernest Adams	7,545	27.6	2	Constituency
1953 Ormskirk by-election	Muriel Ferguson	9,512	34.6	2	
1953 Holborn and St Pancras South by-election	Lena Jeger	15,784	52.1	1	Constituency
1953 Paddington North by-election	Ben Parkin	14,274	53.8	1	Constituency
1954 Ilford North by-election	Thomas Richardson	9,927	32.3	2	
1954 Haltemprice by-election	Charles Bridges	9,974	38.2	2	Railwaymen
1954 Harwich by-election	Shirley Catlin	13,535	40.9	2	Constituency
1954 Bournemouth West by-election	Henry Brinton	9,006	30.3	2	
1954 Arundel and Shoreham by-election	Margaret Reid	11,420	31.5	2	Constituency
1954 Harrogate by-election	Ernest Kavanagh	8,367	29.2	2	
1954 Edinburgh East by-election	George Willis	18,950	57.7	1	Constituency
1954 Motherwell by-election	George Lawson	19,163	56.4	1	Constituency
1954 Croydon East by-election	James Wellwood	13,546	35.4	2	
1954 Shoreditch and Finsbury by-election	Victor Collins	18,082	78.2	1	Constituency
1954 Wakefield by-election	Arthur Creech Jones	21,822	58.1	1	Transport & General Workers
1954 Aberdare by-election	Arthur Probert	24,658	69.5	1	Constituency
1954 Aldershot by-election	William Cuthbertson	12,701	39.9	2	
1954 Morpeth by-election	Will Owen	23,491	71.3	1	Co-op
1954 Sutton and Cheam by-election	Norman Poulter	11,023	33.5	1	
1954 Liverpool West Derby by-election	Cyril Fenton	18,650	46.9	2	Co-op
1954 Inverness by-election	William Paterson	5,642	22.6	3	
1955 South Norfolk by-election	John MacLennan Stewart	14,254	48.5	2	Agricultural Workers
1955 Orpington by-election	David Vaughan Williams	10,426	34.2	2	Constituency
1955 Twickenham by-election	Robert Pitman	12,953	36.0	2	
1955 Edinburgh North by-election	George Scott	7,799	40.6	2	Electrical
1955 Stockport South by-election	Herbert Davies	13,758	45.7	2	
1955 Wrexham by-election	Idwal Jones	23,402	57.9	1	Constituency
