= Marjorie Nicholson =

British socialist activist

Marjorie Nicholson MBE, (22 December 1914 – 22 July 1997) was a British socialist activist.

Born in the Benwell area of Newcastle-upon-Tyne, Nicholson grew up in Kenton, then in Middlesex. She was educated at Harrow High School before winning a scholarship to St Hilda's College, Oxford, where she received a degree in modern history. While at the university, she became interested in socialism, and joined the Oxford University Labour Club.

On graduation, Nicholson became a teacher at the East Ham Grammar School for Girls, also tutoring for the Workers Educational Association, but she returned to Oxford in 1941 as the organising tutor for extra-mural history in Berkshire, Buckinghamshire and Oxfordshire. At the end of World War II, she took up the post of assistant secretary with the Fabian Colonial Bureau. During this period, the bureau was influential with sections of the Labour Party government, particularly with regard to encouraging economic and political development in British colonies. She took three months’ leave in 1949 to run adult education classes in Nigeria, then took over as secretary of the bureau in 1950. By this time, it was struggling financially. She proposed that colonial governments should work with nationalist leaders to gain independence, but the bureau remained open to differing perspectives. However, she resigned in 1955, feeling that the organisation's influence had declined.

Nicholson hoped to pursue her own political career, and stood unsuccessfully for the Labour Party in Windsor at the 1945, 1950 and 1951 United Kingdom general elections.

Despite having resigned from the bureau, Nicholson continued to collaborate with it and write for its journal. She found work with the Commonwealth Department of the Trades Union Congress (TUC), one of the few women working in trade union policy development at the time. She came into frequent contact with trade union leaders in other countries, and undertaking trips to Tanganyika and Nigeria. While loyally passing on advice from the TUC, she recognised that these overseas trade unions should determine their own policies.

Nicholson retired in 1972 and began researching the overseas influence of the TUC. She published one volume on the subject, The TUC overseas: the roots of policy, described in Labour's First Century as "a detailed but somewhat uncritical account". When she died in 1997, a second volume remained incomplete.

Non-profit organization positions
Preceded by Rita Hinden	Secretary of the Fabian Colonial Bureau; 1950–1955	Succeeded by Hilda Selwyn-Clarke
