= Marion Billson =

Marion Graeme Billson (1901 – 1958) was a British solicitor.

Born in Leicester, Billson suffered as a child with a thyroid deficiency. She studied classics at Girton College, Cambridge and then in 1922 was admitted to the Inner Temple. However, she did not practice as a barrister, instead joining a solicitors' practice in Croydon. In 1934, she co-founded Copley, Singleton & Billson.

In 1940, Billson represented Emily Lanceley at Croydon Magistrates' Court, winning an important case which established that a soldier could not reduce his court-ordered maintenance payments.

At the 1945 UK general election, Billson stood for the Labour Party in Croydon North, losing by only 607 votes. After the election, there were rumours that there were uncounted votes from servicemen in the basement of Croydon Town Hall, which would have swung the election in her favour.

After the election, Billson served on Croydon Borough Council, and also chaired her local branch of the Campaign for Nuclear Disarmament. She stood in Croydon East at the 1950 UK general election, taking second place with 37.8% of the vote.
