= Dodo Lees =

British nurse

Dolores "Dodo" Lees (20 April 1920 – 26 August 1991) was a British nurse who became prominent in the French Army.

Born in Dorset, she became a journalist for the Daily Express. Based in Germany, she met Adolf Hitler shortly before World War II, who told her that she would be a good speaker because the two shared a birthday. With the Nazi occupation of Czechoslovakia, she lent her passport to a Jew from Prague, to help them escape. During the war, she served as a nurse with the Voluntary Aid Detachment until D-Day, after which she served as an ambulance driver in the French First Army. She was present at the liberation of the Dachau concentration camp, and used her nursing skills to tend to the former inmates.

Around the end of 1944, she disguised herself as a civilian and crossed German lines, living in a cave while she tended to French resistance members in the Vosges. She crossed into Switzerland to acquire medical supplies, the bills being paid by the French Red Cross after the war. For her efforts, she was awarded the Croix de Guerre, and after the war was made personal staff officer to Philippe Leclerc de Hauteclocque. After Leclerc died in a plane crash, Lees transferred to the French Foreign Office, and toured the United States to speak about French views on the Marshall Plan.

Back in England, Lees joined the Labour Party, and stood in Bournemouth East and Christchurch at the 1950 UK general election. At the 1951 UK general election, she took a close second place in Lancaster. In 1953, she was asked to stand for a safe seat, but she was about to marry and decided against a political career. Known after marriage as Dodo Selby Bennett, she worked closely with Dom Mintoff in Malta from 1955, promoting tourism. At the 1962 South Dorset by-election, she campaigned for Guy Barnett, the successful Labour candidate.

In the late 1960s, Lees spent time in Latin America, where her husband was an attache. Back in England again, she remained active in the Labour Party, speaking in favour of foxhunting, and campaigning against her own husband when he stood for Dorset County Council as a Conservative Party candidate.

Dodo's brother was Mike Lees who served in the Special Operations Executive in Yugoslavia and Italy in WWII. She was married to Chipps Selby Bennett and had two children, James and Bruce.
