= Lewisham North (disambiguation) =

Lewisham North is a parliamentary constituency in Lewisham, London.

Lewisham North may also refer to:

- Lewisham North (London County Council constituency)
- Lewisham North (Scout District)
