= Audrey Callaghan =

British Labour councillor, wife of James Callaghan

The Right Honourable The Lady Callaghan of Cardiff
- Callaghan in 1978
- Born: Audrey Elizabeth Moulton; 28 July 1915; Maidstone, England
- Died: 15 March 2005 (aged 89); Burgess Hill, England
- Education: Maidstone Grammar School for Girls
- Occupations: Dietician; campaigner; councillor; fundraiser
- Known for: Spouse of the prime minister of the United Kingdom (1976–1979)
- Political party: Labour
- Spouse: James Callaghan (m. 1938)
- Children: 3, including Margaret

Audrey Elizabeth Callaghan, Baroness Callaghan of Cardiff (née Moulton; 28 July 1915 – 15 March 2005) was the wife of British Labour prime minister James Callaghan. She served as a Labour councillor and later became a campaigner and fundraiser for children's health and welfare.

== Early life ==
She was born in Maidstone, Kent, where her father was a director of the Lead Wool Company, a tool company. Callaghan was educated at Maidstone Grammar School for Girls, then studied cookery at Battersea College of Domestic Science. She would chair the Maidstone Labour Party and Fabian Society. She joined the Labour Party while in her teens and met her future husband in the early 1930s at the Baptist church Sunday school where they both worked, then at the Labour Party, but they did not marry until 28 July 1938, her 23rd birthday. They honeymooned in Paris and Chamonix, and then returned to rent a house in Norwood.

She worked as a dietician at an antenatal clinic in Greenwich during the Second World War, a young mother herself. At the same time, she studied economics at a University of London extension course in Eltham, with future Labour Party leader Hugh Gaitskell as tutor. She made a special study of malnutrition in children and its remedies.

== Career ==
Her husband was elected a Member of Parliament for Cardiff in 1945. Audrey appeared publicly during his career, but generally remained private. One of her obituaries stated that she was engaged with her husband's jobs and was said to be instrumental in dissuading him from resigning after the 1967 devaluation of the pound.

In 1958, Audrey was elected as the Labour member for Lewisham North for the London County Council. She took a special interest in children's homes and the Children's Committee. She was an alderman of the Greater London Council from 1964 and became chairman of Lewisham Council's children's committee, where she was also an alderman, when the GLC was abolished.

In 1969, Callaghan became the chair of the board of governors of Great Ormond Street Hospital for Sick Children. She continued raising funds for the hospital for the next thirty years, most notably securing an extension of copyright on Peter Pan for the hospital by a Lords amendment moved by her husband.

In 1987, when her husband created Baron Callaghan of Cardiff, she became Lady Callaghan. She herself declined a damehood from Prime Minister Margaret Thatcher. They retired to a farm in Ringmer, East Sussex, where she kept pigs and he kept cows and sheep, and grew barley. Along with her husband, she supported causes relating to the University College of Swansea, of which James Callaghan was president.

During her eighties, Callaghan developed Alzheimer's disease. In July 2001, when her condition had deteriorated, she entered a care home in nearby Burgess Hill, West Sussex, where her husband visited her every day until her death on 15 March 2005, by which time they had been married for 66 years and together for well over 70. James Callaghan died on 26 March 2005, eleven days after Audrey's death, and the day before his 93rd birthday.

== Personal life ==
She had three children: Margaret Jay, Baroness Jay of Paddington, Julia and Michael.

Unofficial roles
Preceded by Mary Wilson	Spouse of the Prime Minister of the United Kingdom; 1976–1979	Succeeded by Denis Thatcher
