= Amparo Galindo =

Spanish chemist and academic

- Education: Complutense University of Madrid; University of Sheffield
- Scientific career
- Workplaces: Imperial College London; University of Patras; Delft University of Technology
- Thesis: Prediction of the phase equilibria of associating systems using the SAFT approach (1993)

Amparo Galindo is a Spanish chemist who is Professor of Chemical Engineering at Imperial College London. She is the co-director of the Institute for Molecular Science and Engineering. Her research considers the development of statistical mechanics and simulations to understand industrial processes. She was awarded the 2023 Institution of Chemical Engineers Guggenheim Medal.

== Early life and education ==
Galindo studied chemistry at the Complutense University of Madrid. She moved to the University of Sheffield for doctoral research, where she studied physical chemistry. Her research used the statistical associating fluid theory to understand phase equilibria in associating systems. She spent a year at BP before joining Delft University of Technology as a postdoctoral fellow. In 1999, Galindo joined the University of Patras, where she worked on liquid crystals.

== Research and career ==
Galindo was made an Engineering and Physical Sciences Research Council Advanced Research Fellow at Imperial College London in 2000. She was made a lecturer in 2002 and a professor in 2011. She is interested in the development of statistical mechanics to understand industrially relevant chemistry. In particular, she looks to understand complex phase behaviour in supercritical separations, polymers and liquid crystals. She has developed the SAFT-γ Mie approach to predict the solubility of active pharmaceutical ingredients in solvents in mixed environments. This is recognised as the most accurate tool for property prediction in complex fluids as it accounts for hydrogen bonding and electrostatic interactions. She was made the Lilly Chair in Pharmaceutical Molecular Systems in 2018. This role saw her develop complex simulations to revolutionise drug discovery.

In 2023, Galindo was awarded the Institution of Chemical Engineers Guggenheim Medal for her work in thermodynamics and complex fluids.

== Selected publications ==
- Alexandros Lymperiadis; Claire S. Adjiman; Amparo Galindo; George Jackson (1 December 2007). "A group contribution method for associating chain molecules based on the statistical associating fluid theory (SAFT-gamma)". The Journal of Chemical Physics. 127 (23): 234903. doi:10.1063/1.2813894. ISSN 0021-9606. PMID 18154411. Wikidata Q48012373.
- Alejandro Gil-Villegas; Amparo Galindo; Paul J. Whitehead; Stuart J. Mills; George Jackson; Andrew N. Burgess (8 March 1997). "Statistical associating fluid theory for chain molecules with attractive potentials of variable range". The Journal of Chemical Physics. 106 (10): 4168–4186. doi:10.1063/1.473101. ISSN 0021-9606. Wikidata Q57379273.
- Niall MacDowell; Nick Florin; Antoine Buchard; et al. (2010). "An overview of CO2 capture technologies". Energy & Environmental Science. 3 (11): 1645. doi:10.1039/c004106h. ISSN 1754-5692. Wikidata Q56016650.
