= East Yorkshire (constituency) =

UK Parliament constituency (1997–2024)

- Former county constituency for the House of Commons
- 2010–2024 boundary of East Yorkshire in Humberside

- Location of Humberside within England
- County: East Riding of Yorkshire
- Population: 100,377 (2011 census)
- Electorate: 79,701 (December 2019)
- Major settlements: Bridlington, Driffield, Pocklington, Market Weighton

1997–2024
- Seats: One
- Created from: Bridlington; Boothferry
- Replaced by: Bridlington and The Wolds; Goole and Pocklington (part)

East Yorkshire was a county constituency for the House of Commons of the Parliament of the United Kingdom, established for 1997 general election. It elected one Member of Parliament (MP) at least once every five years by the first-past-the-post electoral system. The constituency represented northern part of the East Riding of Yorkshire county.

Further to the completion of the 2023 review of Westminster constituencies, the seat was abolished and replaced primarily (with moderate boundary changes) by the new Bridlington and The Wolds constituency since 2024 general election.

== History ==
The East Yorkshire constituency was created for the 1997 general election and replaced the Bridlington constituency. The Conservative MP for that seat since 1979, John Townend, won the new seat and held it until he retired at the 2001 general election. His successor Greg Knight had previously represented the marginal seat of Derby North from 1983 until he was defeated in the 1997 general election. Since the creation of the constituency until its abolition in 2024 it was Conservative safe seat and ranked 170th in terms of their share of the vote of their 631 candidates, with an approximately equally divided opposition in 2010.

== Boundaries ==
Map of boundaries 2010–2024

1997–2010: The Borough of East Yorkshire.

2010–2024: The District of East Riding of Yorkshire wards of Bridlington Central and Old Town, Bridlington North, Bridlington South, Driffield and Rural, East Wolds and Coastal, Pocklington Provincial, and Wolds Weighton.

== Members of Parliament ==
Election	Member	Party
1997	John Townend	Conservative
2001	Greg Knight	Conservative
2024	constituency abolished	

== Election results 1997–2024 ==
=== Elections in the 1990s ===
General election 1997: East Yorkshire
Party	Candidate	Votes	%	±%
Conservative	John Townend	20,904	42.7	
Labour	Ian Male	17,567	35.9	
Liberal Democrats	David Leadley	9,070	18.5	
SDP	Raymond Allerston	1,049	2.1	
National Democrats	Michael Cooper	381	0.8	
Majority		3,337	6.8	
Turnout		48,971	70.5	
Registered electors		69,482		
Conservative win (new seat)				

=== Elections in the 2000s ===
General election 2001: East Yorkshire
Party	Candidate	Votes	%	±%
Conservative	Greg Knight	19,861	45.9	+3.2
Labour	Tracey Simpson-Laing	15,179	35.0	−0.9
Liberal Democrats	Mary-Rose Hardy	6,300	14.5	−4.0
UKIP	Trevor Pearson	1,661	3.8	New
Independent	Paul Dessoy	313	0.7	New
Majority		4,682	10.9	+4.1
Turnout		43,314	60.1	−10.4
Registered electors		72,052		
Conservative hold		Swing	+2.1	

General election 2005: East Yorkshire
Party	Candidate	Votes	%	±%
Conservative	Greg Knight	21,215	45.2	−0.7
Labour	Emma Hoddinott	14,932	31.8	−3.2
Liberal Democrats	Jim Wastling	9,075	19.3	+4.8
UKIP	Christopher Tresidder	1,703	3.6	−0.2
Majority		6,283	13.4	+2.5
Turnout		46,925	61.6	+1.5
Registered electors		76,218		
Conservative hold		Swing	+2.0	

=== Elections in the 2010s ===
General election 2010: East Yorkshire
Party	Candidate	Votes	%	±%
Conservative	Greg Knight	24,328	47.5	+2.3
Liberal Democrats	Robert Adamson	10,842	21.2	+1.9
Labour	Paul Rounding	10,401	20.3	−11.5
UKIP	Chris Daniels	2,142	4.2	+0.6
BNP	Gary Pudsey	1,865	3.6	+3.6
SDP	Ray Allerston	914	1.8	New
Green	Mike Jackson	762	1.5	New
Majority		13,486	26.3	+12.9
Turnout		51,254	64.0	+2.4
Registered electors		80,105		
Conservative hold		Swing	+0.2	

General election 2015: East Yorkshire
Party	Candidate	Votes	%	±%
Conservative	Greg Knight	25,276	50.6	+3.1
Labour	Kevin Hickson	10,343	20.7	+0.4
UKIP	Stephanie Todd	8,955	17.9	+13.7
Liberal Democrats	Robert Adamson	2,966	5.9	−15.3
Green	Mark Maloney	1,731	3.5	+2.0
Yorkshire First	Stewart Arnold	720	1.4	New
Majority		14,933	29.9	+3.6
Turnout		49,991	61.7	−2.3
Registered electors		81,023		
Conservative hold		Swing	+1.4	

General election 2017: East Yorkshire
Party	Candidate	Votes	%	±%
Conservative	Greg Knight	31,442	58.3	+7.7
Labour	Alan Clark	16,436	30.5	+9.8
Liberal Democrats	Carl Minns	2,134	4.0	−1.9
UKIP	Andrew Dennis	1,986	3.7	−14.2
Yorkshire	Timothy Norman	1,015	1.9	+0.5
Green	Michael Jackson	943	1.7	−1.8
Majority		15,006	27.8	−2.1
Turnout		53,956	66.6	+4.9
Registered electors		81,065		
Conservative hold		Swing	−1.1	

General election 2019: East Yorkshire
Party	Candidate	Votes	%	±%
Conservative	Greg Knight	33,988	64.4	+6.1
Labour	Catherine Minnis	11,201	21.2	–9.3
Liberal Democrats	Dale Needham	4,219	8.0	+4.0
Yorkshire	Tim Norman	1,686	3.2	+1.3
Green	Mike Jackson	1,675	3.2	+1.5
Majority		22,787	43.2	+15.4
Turnout		52,769	65.3	–1.3
Registered electors		80,871		
Conservative hold		Swing	+7.7	

== See also ==
- List of parliamentary constituencies in Humberside
