= Aris Papageorghiou =

Cypriot-German physician

Aris T. Papageorghiou
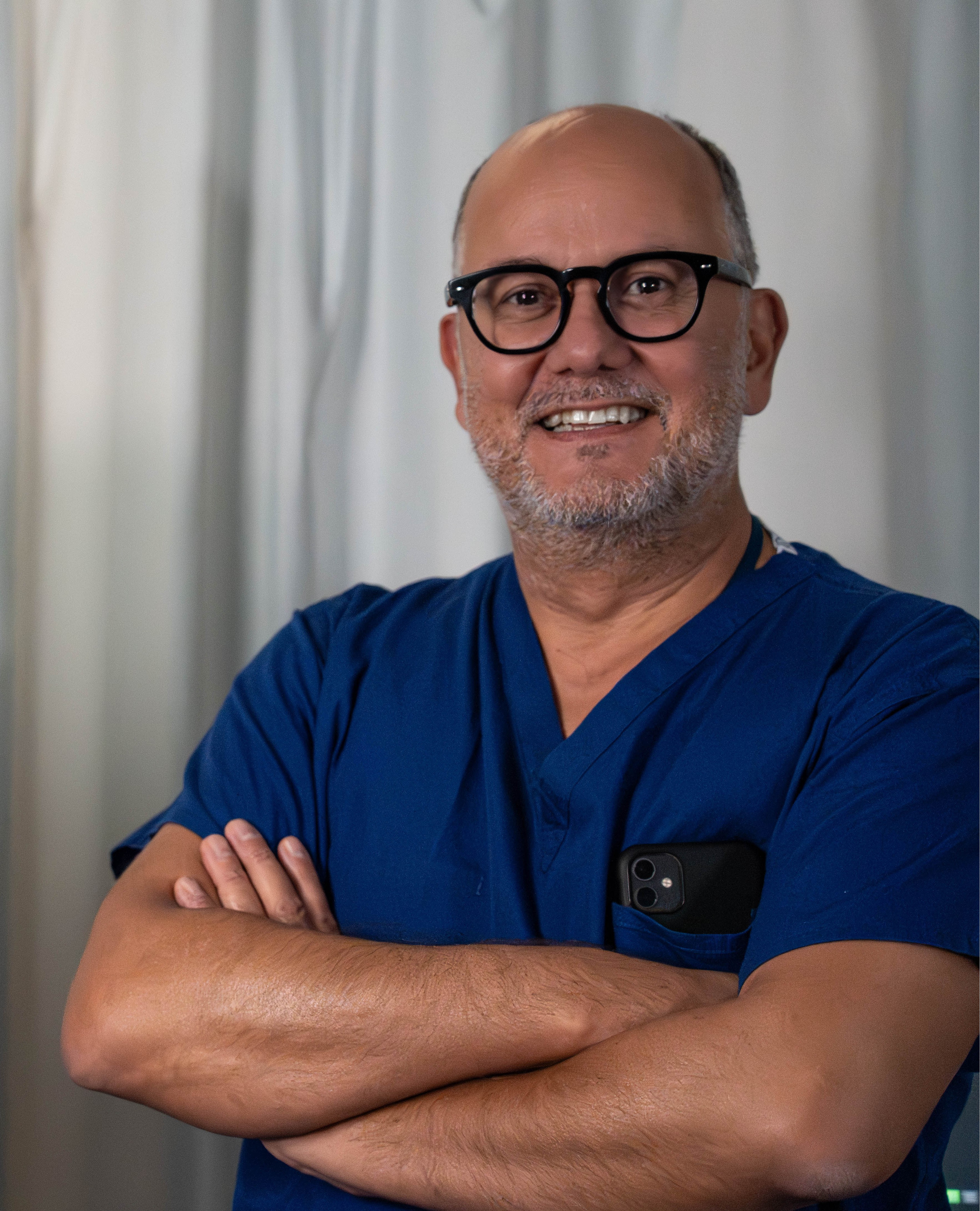
- Papageorghiou in 2025
- Education: King's College, London; University of Sheffield
- Scientific career
- Workplaces: University of Oxford; St George's Hospital

Aris T. Papageorghiou MBChB, MD, FRCOG, FAIUM (hon) (born 1970) is a Cypriot-British physician and researcher known for his work in maternal and perinatal health. He is a professor in fetal medicine at the Nuffield Department of Women's & Reproductive Health, University of Oxford, where he is the clinical research director of the Oxford Maternal and Perinatal Health Institute (OMPHI) and St George's Healthcare NHS Trust in London where he is a professor of fetal medicine and obstetrics. He is also editor-in-chief of the British Journal of Obstetrics and Gynaecology.

== Early life and education ==
Papageorghiou was born in Cyprus, where he spent his childhood, before relocating to Germany. He studied medicine in the United Kingdom, graduating with an MBChB from the University of Sheffield in 1996. After initial medical training he joined the Harris Birthright Unit at King's College Hospital to undertake research with Kypros Nicolaides on the use of Doppler Ultrasound for screening for pre-eclampsia.

He completed his medical training in obstetrics and gynaecology as well as subspeciality training in maternal and fetal medicine. During this time he was a clinical lecturer working with Sabaratnam Arulkumaran at St George's, University of London.

== Career ==
Papageorghiou's clinical work is in maternal and fetal medicine and obstetrics. His research group at Oxford works on large global projects, including in low resource settings. This includes the large INTERGROWTH-21st Project. One of his major research contributions is in the use of artificial intelligence (AI) in imaging, including for use in underserved regions. As part of his work in AI he co-founded the Oxford University spin-out, Intelligent Ultrasound, with his longstanding collaborator, Alison Noble.

From 2012 to 2019 he was the Honorary Secretary, International Society Ultrasound Obstetrics and Gynecology. Papageorghiou is a visiting professor at Capital Medical University, Beijing, and national chair of the expert working group in obstetrics and gynecology for the UK Health and Social Care Information Centre.

Papageorghiou has authored over 350 peer-reviewed original articles, over 18000 citations and an h-index of 74.

== Personal life ==
Papageorghiou is married to Amparo Galindo.

== Awards and honors ==
- 2016: Honorary Fellow, American Institute of Ultrasound in Medicine
- 2019: Fellowship, International Society of Ultrasound in Obstetrics and Gynecology
- 2019: Doctor Honoris Causa, University of Athens

== Selected publications ==
- Pels, Anouk; Ganzevoort, Wessel; Kenny, Louise C; Baker, Philip N; von Dadelszen, Peter; Gluud, Christian; Kariya, Chirag T; Leemhuis, Aleid G; Groom, Katie M; Sharp, Andrew N; Magee, Laura A; Jakobsen, Janus C; Mol, Ben Willem J; Papageorghiou, Aris T (July 10, 2023). "Interventions affecting the nitric oxide pathway versus placebo or no therapy for fetal growth restriction in pregnancy". Cochrane Database of Systematic Reviews. 2023 (7) CD014498. doi:10.1002/14651858.CD014498. PMC 10332237. PMID 37428872.
- Lee, Lok Hin; Bradburn, Elizabeth; Craik, Rachel; Yaqub, Mohammad; Norris, Shane A.; Ismail, Leila Cheikh; Ohuma, Eric O.; Barros, Fernando C.; Lambert, Ann; Carvalho, Maria; Jaffer, Yasmin A.; Gravett, Michael; Purwar, Manorama; Wu, Qingqing; Bertino, Enrico; Munim, Shama; Min, Aung Myat; Bhutta, Zulfiqar; Villar, Jose; Kennedy, Stephen H.; Noble, J. Alison; Papageorghiou, Aris T. (March 9, 2023). "Machine learning for accurate estimation of fetal gestational age based on ultrasound images". npj Digital Medicine. 6 (1): 36. doi:10.1038/s41746-023-00774-2. PMC 9998590. PMID 36894653.
- Villar, Jose; Soto Conti, Constanza P; Gunier, Robert B; Ariff, Shabina; Craik, Rachel; Cavoretto, Paolo I; Rauch, Stephen; Gandino, Serena; Nieto, Ricardo; Winsey, Adele; Menis, Camilla; Rodriguez, Gabriel B; Savasi, Valeria; Tug, Niyazi; Deantoni, Sonia; Fabre, Marta; Martinez de Tejada, Begoña; Rodriguez-Sibaja, Maria Jose; Livio, Stefania; Napolitano, Raffaele; Maiz, Nerea; Sobrero, Helena; Peterson, Ashley; Deruelle, Philippe; Giudice, Carolina; Teji, Jagjit S; Casale, Roberto A; Salomon, Laurent J; Prefumo, Federico; Cheikh Ismail, Leila; Gravett, Michael G; Vale, Marynéa; Hernández, Valeria; Sentilhes, Loïc; Easter, Sarah R; Capelli, Carola; Marler, Emily; Cáceres, Daniela M; Albornoz Crespo, Guadalupe; Ernawati, Ernawati; Lipschuetz, Michal; Takahashi, Ken; Vecchiarelli, Carmen; Hubka, Teresa; Ikenoue, Satoru; Tavchioska, Gabriela; Bako, Babagana; Ayede, Adejumoke I; Eskenazi, Brenda; Thornton, Jim G; Bhutta, Zulfiqar A; Kennedy, Stephen H; Papageorghiou, Aris T (February 19, 2023). "Pregnancy outcomes and vaccine effectiveness during the period of omicron as the variant of concern, INTERCOVID-2022: a multinational, observational study". The Lancet. 401 (10375): 447–457. doi:10.1016/s0140-6736(22)02467-9. hdl:11379/568690. PMC 9910845. PMID 36669520.
- Papageorghiou, Aris T.; Ohuma, Eric O.; Gravett, Michael G.; Hirst, Jane; Silveira, Mariangela F. da; Lambert, Ann; Carvalho, Maria; Jaffer, Yasmin A.; Altman, Douglas G.; Noble, Julia A.; Bertino, Enrico; Purwar, Manorama; Pang, Ruyan; Ismail, Leila Cheikh; Victora, Cesar; Bhutta, Zulfiqar A.; Kennedy, Stephen H.; Villar, José (November 7, 2016). "International standards for symphysis-fundal height based on serial measurements from the Fetal Growth Longitudinal Study of the INTERGROWTH-21st Project: prospective cohort study in eight countries". BMJ. 355 i5662. doi:10.1136/bmj.i5662. PMC 5098415. PMID 27821614 – via www.bmj.com.
- Papageorghiou, Aris T; Ohuma, Eric O; Altman, Douglas G; Todros, Tullia; Ismail, Leila Cheikh; Lambert, Ann; Jaffer, Yasmin A; Bertino, Enrico; Gravett, Michael G; Purwar, Manorama; Noble, J Alison; Pang, Ruyan; Victora, Cesar G; Barros, Fernando C; Carvalho, Maria; Salomon, Laurent J; Bhutta, Zulfiqar A; Kennedy, Stephen H; Villar, José (September 19, 2014). "International standards for fetal growth based on serial ultrasound measurements: the Fetal Growth Longitudinal Study of the INTERGROWTH-21st Project". The Lancet. 384 (9946): 869–879. doi:10.1016/s0140-6736(14)61490-2. PMID 25209488.
