= Keith E. Gubbins =

American chemical engineer

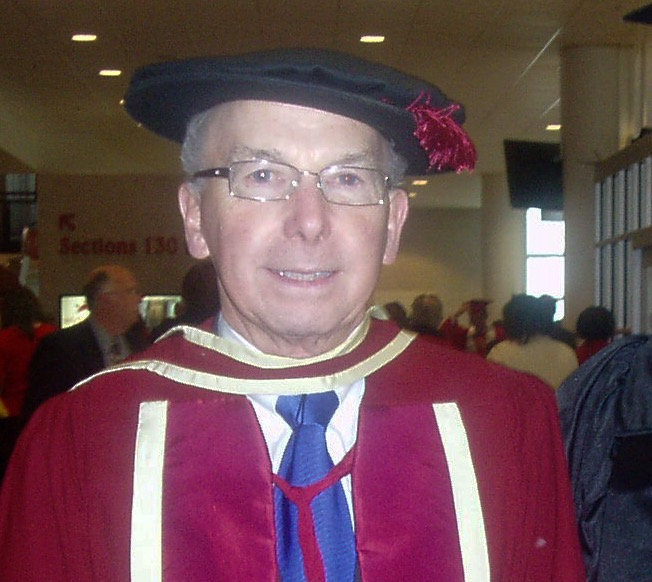
- Education: King's College London
- Known for: Statistical associating fluid theory
- Scientific career
- Fields: Chemical engineering
- Workplaces: North Carolina State University; Cornell University; University of Florida

Keith E. Gubbins (born January 27, 1937) is a British-born American chemical engineer who is the emeritus W.H. Clark Distinguished University Professor of Chemical Engineering at North Carolina State University in Raleigh, North Carolina. He is perhaps best known as one of the originators of statistical associating fluid theory (SAFT).

Gubbins was elected a member of the National Academy of Engineering in 1989 for pioneering development of computer simulation and perturbation theory for extending statistical mechanical techniques to systems of engineering interest.

== Academic Tree ==
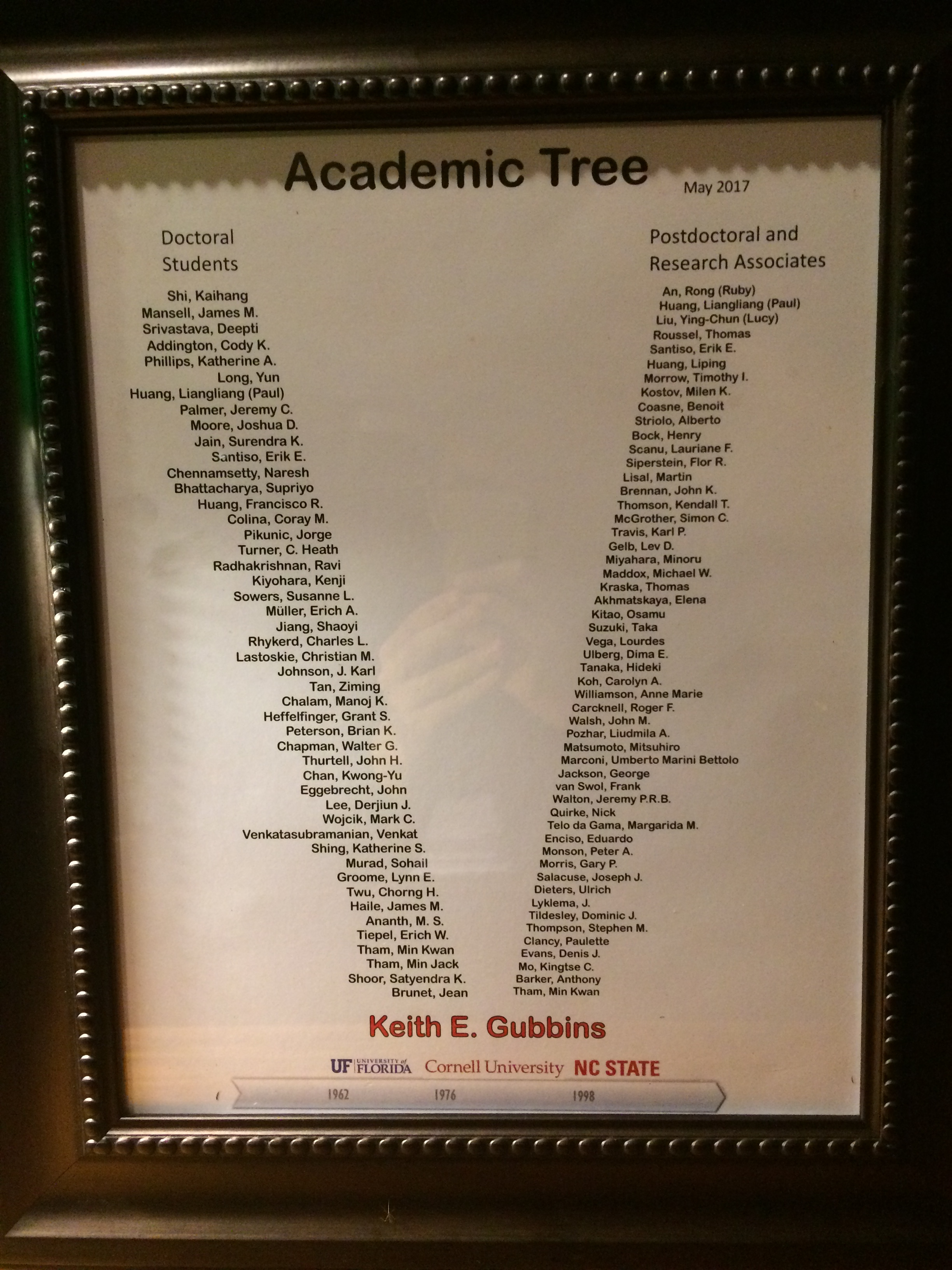
Academic tree of Keith Gubbins

He has been the supervisor of 47 PhD students and 53 postdoctoral associates, of whom 56 now hold faculty positions in the United States, Europe (Czech Republic, France, Germany, Ireland, Italy, Poland, Portugal, Spain, UK), Asia (Mainland China, Hong Kong (China), India, Japan, Singapore) and Australia, among them Ravi Radhakrishnan, Coray Colina and George Jackson, FRS.
