= Parliamentary Under-Secretary of State for Youth, Gambling, Digital Inclusion, Civil Society & Loneliness =

Former ministerial position within the UK Government

Minister for Civil Society
- Royal arms of His Majesty's Government

- Incumbent; Vicky Foxcroft since 22 July 2026
- Department for Digital, Culture, Media and Sport
- Style: Minister
- Nominator: Prime Minister of the United Kingdom
- Appointer: The monarch; on advice of the prime minister
- Term length: At His Majesty's pleasure
- Formation: 6 May 2006
- First holder: Ed Miliband

The Parliamentary Under-Secretary of State for Youth, Gambling, Digital Inclusion, Civil Society & Loneliness is a position within the Department for Digital, Culture, Media and Sport in the Government of the United Kingdom. It concerned and directly supported charities, volunteering and social enterprise.

The office was established during the third Blair ministry as Minister for the Third Sector. The office was renamed to support the Big Society manifesto-committed agenda of the first and second Cameron ministries. Before the new commitments and Cabinet reshuffle on formation of the May Ministry in 2016 the Office for Civil Society supporting the Minister was part of the Cabinet Office. Some responsibilities were moved to the office of Minister for Sport and Civil Society following the 2017 general election.

== List of ministers ==
Name	Portrait	Took office	Left office	Political party	Prime Minister
Minister for the Third Sector (Parliamentary Secretary in the Cabinet Office)
	Ed Miliband; MP for Doncaster North	6 May 2006	28 June 2007	Labour	Tony Blair
	Phil Hope; MP for Corby	28 June 2007	5 October 2008	Labour Co-op	Gordon Brown
	Kevin Brennan; MP for Cardiff West	5 October 2008	8 June 2009	Labour	Gordon Brown
Minister of State for the Third Sector (Parliamentary Secretary in the Cabinet Office)
	Angela Smith; MP for Basildon	8 June 2009	11 May 2010	Labour Co-op	Gordon Brown
Minister for Civil Society (Parliamentary Secretary in the Cabinet Office)
	Nick Hurd; MP for Ruislip, Northwood and Pinner	15 May 2010	14 July 2014	Conservative	David Cameron
	Brooks Newmark; MP for Braintree	15 July 2014	27 September 2014	Conservative	David Cameron
	Rob Wilson; MP for Reading East	27 September 2014	8 June 2017	Conservative	David Cameron
	Rob Wilson; MP for Reading East	27 September 2014	8 June 2017	Conservative	Theresa May
	Henry Ashton, 4th Baron Ashton of Hyde; Hereditary peer	8 June 2017	26 July 2019	Conservative	Theresa May
	Diana Barran, Baroness Barran; Life peer	26 July 2019	17 September 2021	Conservative	Boris Johnson
Role merged into Parliamentary Under-Secretary of State for Sport, Tourism, Heritage and Civil Society Parliamentary Under-Secretary of State for Civil Society, Heritage, Tourism and Growth (in Department for Digital, Culture, Media and Sport)
	Syed Kamall, Baron Kamall; Life peer	20 September 2022	28 October 2022	Conservative	Liz Truss
Role merged into Parliamentary Under-Secretary of State for Sport, Tourism and Civil Society Parliamentary Under-Secretary of State for Youth, Gambling, Digital Inclusion, Civil Society & Loneliness (in Department for Digital, Culture, Media and Sport)
	Vicky Foxcroft; MP for Lewisham North	22 July 2026	Incumbent	Labour	Andy Burnham

== Shadow Ministers for Civil Society ==
Shadow Minister	Term of office		Party	Opposition Leader
Shadow Minister for Civil Society
Roberta Blackman-Woods; MP for City of Durham	8 October 2010	7 October 2011	Labour	Ed Miliband
Gareth Thomas; MP for Harrow West	7 October 2011	7 October 2013	Labour	Ed Miliband
Lisa Nandy; MP for Wigan	7 October 2013	14 September 2015	Labour	Ed Miliband
Anna Turley; MP for Redcar	18 September 2015	27 June 2016	Labour	Jeremy Corbyn
Shadow Minister for Trade Unions and Civil Society
Ian Lavery; MP for Wansbeck	18 September 2015	7 October 2016	Labour	Jeremy Corbyn
Shadow Minister for Civil Society
Steve Reed; MP for Croydon North	3 October 2016	24 June 2019	Labour	Jeremy Corbyn
Vicky Foxcroft; MP for Lewisham Deptford	24 June 2019	10 April 2020	Labour	Jeremy Corbyn
Shadow Minister for Voluntary Sector and Charities
Rachael Maskell; MP for York Central	10 April 2020	4 December 2021	Labour	Keir Starmer
Shadow Minister for Arts, Civil Society and Youth
Rachael Maskell; MP for York Central	4 December 2021	14 December 2021	Labour	Keir Starmer
Shadow Minister for Arts and Civil Society
Barbara Keeley; MP for Worsley and Eccles South	11 March 2022	30 May 2024	Labour	Keir Starmer
