= Lewisham North (London County Council constituency) =

Former London County Council constituency (1949–1965)

- Former constituency for the London County Council

Former constituency
- Created: 1949
- Abolished: 1965
- Member(s): 3
- Created from: Lewisham East

Lewisham North was a constituency used for elections to the London County Council between 1949 and the council's abolition, in 1965. The seat shared boundaries with the UK Parliament constituency of the same name.

== Councillors ==
Year	Name	Party	Name	Party	Name	Party
1949	Norman Farmer	Conservative	Pearl Hulbert	Conservative	John Martin Oakey	Conservative
1952	Norman Farmer	Conservative	Irene Rose	Conservative	John Martin Oakey	Conservative
1958	Norman Farmer	Conservative	Audrey Callaghan	Labour	Christopher Chataway	Conservative
1961	Norman Farmer	Conservative	Antony Thomas Reid Fletcher	Conservative	Irene Rose	Conservative

== Election results ==
1949 London County Council election: Lewisham North
Party	Candidate	Votes	%	±%
Conservative	Norman Farmer	17,153		
Conservative	Pearl Hulbert	16,793		
Conservative	John Martin Oakey	16,647		
Labour	Fred Copeman	11,593		
Labour	H. N. White	11,406		
Labour	G. Somerset	11,319		

1952 London County Council election: Lewisham North
Party	Candidate	Votes	%	±%
Conservative	Norman Farmer	16,735		
Conservative	John Martin Oakey	16,500		
Conservative	Irene Rose	16,190		
Labour	Audrey Callaghan	14,110		
Labour	T. E. Smith	13,866		
Labour	G. A. Arkle	13,775		
Conservative hold		Swing		

1955 London County Council election: Lewisham North
Party	Candidate	Votes	%	±%
Conservative	Norman Farmer	14,376		
Conservative	John Martin Oakey	14,154		
Conservative	Irene Rose	14,131		
Labour	G. A. Arkle	11,782		
Labour	C. W. Bird	11,761		
Labour	S. Davis	11,743		
Conservative hold		Swing		

1958 London County Council election: Lewisham North
Party	Candidate	Votes	%	±%
Conservative	Christopher Chataway	12,419		
Labour	Audrey Callaghan	12,103		
Conservative	Norman Farmer	12,019		
Labour	J. P. Carruthers	12,015		
Labour	G. A. Arkle	11,659		
Conservative	Irene Rose	11,444		
Liberal	A. Hudson	2,439		
Liberal	G. Hudson	2,423		
Liberal	B. Dohoo	2,392		
Labour gain from Conservative		Swing		
Conservative hold		Swing		
Conservative hold		Swing		

1961 London County Council election: Lewisham North
Party	Candidate	Votes	%	±%
Conservative	Norman Farmer	13,612		
Conservative	Anthony Fletcher	13,177		
Conservative	Irene Rose	13,154		
Labour	Niall MacDermot	11,972		
Labour	J. P. Carruthers	11,223		
Labour	Audrey Callaghan	10,977		
Liberal	N. Cutler	2,612		
Liberal	G. Hucklebridge	2,371		
Liberal	B. Dohoo	2,313		
Conservative gain from Labour		Swing		
Conservative hold		Swing		
Conservative hold		Swing		
