= John Townend =

British politician

Member of Parliament for East Yorkshire Bridlington (1979–1997)
- In office 3 May 1979 – 14 May 2001
- Preceded by: Richard Wood
- Succeeded by: Greg Knight

Personal details
- Born: 12 June 1934 Kingston upon Hull, England
- Died: 18 August 2018 (aged 84)
- Party: Conservative
- Profession: Accountant

John Ernest Townend (12 June 1934 – 18 August 2018) was a British politician who was a Member of Parliament for the Conservative Party.

== Early years ==
The son of Charles Hope and Dorothy Townend, he was born on 12 June 1934 in Kingston upon Hull, Yorkshire, and educated at Hymers College in Hull. He studied accountancy from 1951 to 1957 as an articled clerk, and received the Plender Prize for the top prize when he became a Chartered Accountant. He then served in the Royal Air Force as a commissioned Pilot Officer from 1957 to 1959. In the latter year, he joined his family business as commercial secretary and finance director, becoming managing director (1961–1979) and then chairman of House of Townend wine merchants in Hull. He was Chairman of the Yorkshire and Humberside Wine and Spirit Merchants' Association (1975–76). In 1977, he became an Underwriter at Lloyds.

== Politics ==
Townend was active in local politics and unsuccessfully contested the parliamentary seat of Hull North at the 1970 general election. He was then elected to Humberside County Council in 1973, becoming the Leader of the Conservative Group and shadow chairman of the policy committee. He also became a member of the Conservative National Advisory Committee on local Government. He subsequently became leader of the county council, chairman of its policy committee, and member of the policy committee of the Association of County Councils, 1977. He was a member of Hull City Council from 1966 to 1974.

At the 1979 general election, Townend was elected as the Conservative Party Member of Parliament for Bridlington, East Riding of Yorkshire, a seat which he held until his retirement in 2001. He served as secretary of the Conservative Back-bench finance committee and was a member of the Select Committee on Treasury and Civil Service affairs and vice-chairman of the Back-bench finance committee. He was also principal private secretary to Hugh Rossi, the Minister of Pensions and the Disabled. He became chairman of the Small Businesses Committee, a Fellow of the Industry and Parliament Trust, and a member of the executive committee of IPU. His main interests while in Parliament were Treasury and taxation, small businesses, employment, and Southern Africa.

== Views on immigration ==
Townend was renowned for his outspoken views on race and immigration. In 1984, he suggested that foreigners employed in industries should be replaced by unemployed Britons, and in 1989 he stated that "England must be reconquered for the English. They (Muslims opposed to Salman Rushdie's Satanic Verses) should go back from whence they came." In 2001, shortly before his retirement as an MP, he became engulfed in a row within the Conservative Party when, referring to a statement by Foreign Secretary Robin Cook that there was no such thing as a British race, he said that his constituents in Bridlington would not agree, and asked whether Cook therefore thought instead that the British were a "mongrel race". He was chairman of the right-wing 92 Group.

== Personal life ==
Townend married Jennifer Ann Lawson in 1963. The couple had two sons and two daughters. Outside politics, he listed his recreations as swimming and tennis. He lived in Beverley, East Riding of Yorkshire, and was a member of the Conservative-affiliated Carlton Club.

He died on 18 August 2018, aged 84.

Parliament of the United Kingdom
Preceded by Richard Wood	Member of Parliament for Bridlington; 1979–1997	Constituency abolished
New constituency	Member of Parliament for East Yorkshire; 1997–2001	Succeeded by Greg Knight
