= 92 Group =

Right-wing grouping within the British Conservative Party

The 92 Group was a right-wing grouping within the British Conservative Party. They were so named because they would meet at Conservative MP Sir Patrick Wall's home, 92 Cheyne Walk in Chelsea, London. It was founded in 1964 in order to "keep the Conservative Party conservative" and membership is by invitation only. During the period of Margaret Thatcher's leadership of the Conservative Party, it was a prominent supporter of her policies. During John Major's premiership, it became a focus for Thatcherite MPs dissatisfied with his leadership. It was also prominent in supporting John Redwood's unsuccessful candidacy against Major for the leadership of the Conservative Party in 1995.

Its first chairman was Wall, and John Townend was at one time chairman, as was Gerald Howarth. George Gardiner, David Maclean, Christopher Chope and Edward Leigh have been members. In 1996 there were around one hundred members of the Group. They grouped together as a block vote in committee elections and to influence party policy. Norman Tebbit records in his memoirs that shortly after being elected an MP in 1970, he was elected to the party's backbench committee on housing policy, even though he was virtually unknown to most MPs. However, at committee election times, the group met to agree on a slate of candidates they were expected to support, thus explaining Tebbit's success.

Gardiner as chairman promoted 92 Group members for elections to Conservative backbench committees. Important members of the Group were therefore interviewed by the media during Major's premiership to represent Conservative backbench opinion.
