= Bridlington (constituency) =

Parliamentary constituency in the United Kingdom, 1950–1997

Coordinates: 54.083°N 0.192°W

- Former county constituency for the House of Commons
- Bridlington in Humberside, showing boundaries used from 1983–1997
- County: 1950–1974 East Riding of Yorkshire; 1974–1996 Humberside; 1996–1997 East Riding of Yorkshire

1950–1997
- Seats: One
- Created from: Buckrose and Holderness
- Replaced by: Beverley and Holderness and East Yorkshire

Bridlington was a constituency in East Yorkshire, represented in the House of Commons of the Parliament of the United Kingdom from 1950 until it was abolished for the 1997 general election. It was named after the town of Bridlington.

It returned one Member of Parliament (MP), elected by the first-past-the-post voting system.

== History ==
The constituency was created in 1950 from the former seat of Buckrose. It was abolished in 1997 and most of its territory transferred to the East Yorkshire seat.

== Boundaries ==
1950–1955: The Municipal Boroughs of Bridlington and Hedon, the Urban Districts of Driffield, Filey, Hornsea, and Withernsea, and the Rural Districts of Bridlington, Driffield, and Holderness.

1955–1983: The Municipal Boroughs of Bridlington and Hedon, the Urban Districts of Filey, Hornsea, and Withernsea, and the Rural Districts of Bridlington and Holderness. The two Driffield districts were transferred to the new Howden constituency.

1983–1997: The Borough of East Yorkshire wards of Bridlington Bessingby, Bridlington Hilderthorpe, Bridlington Old Town East, Bridlington Old Town West, Bridlington Quay North, Bridlington Quay South, Coastal, Driffield North, Driffield South, Hutton Cranswick, Lowland, Nafferton, Roman, St John, and Viking, and the Borough of Holderness. Driffield transferred back from Howden.

== Members of Parliament ==
Election	Member	Party
1950	Richard Wood	Conservative
1979	John Townend	Conservative
1997	constituency abolished	

== Elections ==
=== Elections in the 1950s ===
General election 1950: Bridlington
Party	Candidate	Votes	%	±%
Conservative	Richard Wood	26,124	50.9	
Liberal	George Wadsworth	16,158	31.5	
Labour	Wilfrid Pashby	9,013	17.6	
Majority		9,966	19.4	
Turnout		51,295	81.9	
Conservative win (new seat)				

General election 1951: Bridlington
Party	Candidate	Votes	%	±%
Conservative	Richard Wood	30,576	61.09	
Labour	Gerard McQuade	12,931	25.83	
Liberal	Douglas Eugene Moore	6,546	13.08	
Majority		17,645	35.26	
Turnout		50,053	78.38	
Conservative hold		Swing		

General election 1955: Bridlington
Party	Candidate	Votes	%	±%
Conservative	Richard Wood	25,880	70.92	
Labour	Kathleen M Roberts	10,614	29.08	
Majority		15,266	41.84	
Turnout		36,494	69.40	
Conservative hold		Swing		

General election 1959: Bridlington
Party	Candidate	Votes	%	±%
Conservative	Richard Wood	27,438	73.20	
Labour	Harry Moor	10,047	26.80	
Majority		17,391	46.40	
Turnout		37,485	68.15	
Conservative hold		Swing		

=== Elections in the 1960s ===
General election 1964: Bridlington
Party	Candidate	Votes	%	±%
Conservative	Richard Wood	22,729	56.50	
Labour	Kevin McNamara	9,002	22.38	
Liberal	John J MacCallum	8,494	21.12	New
Majority		13,727	34.12	
Turnout		40,225	72.78	
Conservative hold		Swing		

General election 1966: Bridlington
Party	Candidate	Votes	%	±%
Conservative	Richard Wood	21,976	54.58	
Labour Co-op	John Tomlinson	11,939	29.65	
Liberal	Trevor Silverwood	6,349	15.77	
Majority		10,037	24.93	
Turnout		40,264	71.47	
Conservative hold		Swing		

=== Elections in the 1970s ===
General election 1970: Bridlington
Party	Candidate	Votes	%	±%
Conservative	Richard Wood	25,053	58.10	
Labour	Harold A. Clarke	11,546	26.79	
Liberal	Trevor Silverwood	6,495	15.07	
Majority		13,507	31.31	
Turnout		43,094	68.64	
Conservative hold		Swing		

General election February 1974: Bridlington
Party	Candidate	Votes	%	±%
Conservative	Richard Wood	25,711	51.21	
Liberal	JMS Cherry	14,715	29.31	
Labour	AAW Dix	9,780	19.48	
Majority		10,996	21.90	
Turnout		50,206	76.91	
Conservative hold		Swing		

General election October 1974: Bridlington
Party	Candidate	Votes	%	±%
Conservative	Richard Wood	21,901	49.07	
Liberal	JMS Cherry	11,795	26.43	
Labour	AAW Dix	9,946	22.29	
National Front	F Day	987	2.21	New
Majority		10,106	22.64	
Turnout		44,629	67.87	
Conservative hold		Swing		

General election 1979: Bridlington
Party	Candidate	Votes	%	±%
Conservative	John Townend	27,988	54.80	
Labour	PJ Doyle	12,693	24.85	
Liberal	D Horsley	10,390	20.34	
Majority		15,295	29.95	
Turnout		51,071	74.18	
Conservative hold		Swing		

=== Elections in the 1980s ===
General election 1983: Bridlington
Party	Candidate	Votes	%	±%
Conservative	John Townend	31,284	57.79	
SDP	E Martin	14,675	27.11	
Labour	M Craven	7,370	13.61	
Ecology	S Tooke	803	1.48	New
Majority		16,609	30.68	
Turnout		54,132	70.56	
Conservative hold		Swing		

General election 1987: Bridlington
Party	Candidate	Votes	%	±%
Conservative	John Townend	32,351	54.82	
SDP	Edmund Marshall	15,030	25.47	
Labour	Leonard Bird	10,653	18.05	
Green	Richard Myerscough	983	1.67	
Majority		17,321	29.35	
Turnout		59,017	73.66	
Conservative hold		Swing		

=== Elections in the 1990s ===
General election 1992: Bridlington
Party	Candidate	Votes	%	±%
Conservative	John Townend	33,604	50.8	−4.0
Liberal Democrats	John A. Leeman	17,246	26.1	+0.6
Labour	Steven M. Hatfield	15,263	23.1	+5.1
Majority		16,358	24.7	−4.6
Turnout		66,113	77.8	+4.1
Conservative hold		Swing	−2.3	

== See also ==
- List of parliamentary constituencies in Humberside
