= Niall MacDermot =

British politician (1916–1996)

Niall MacDermot CBE QC
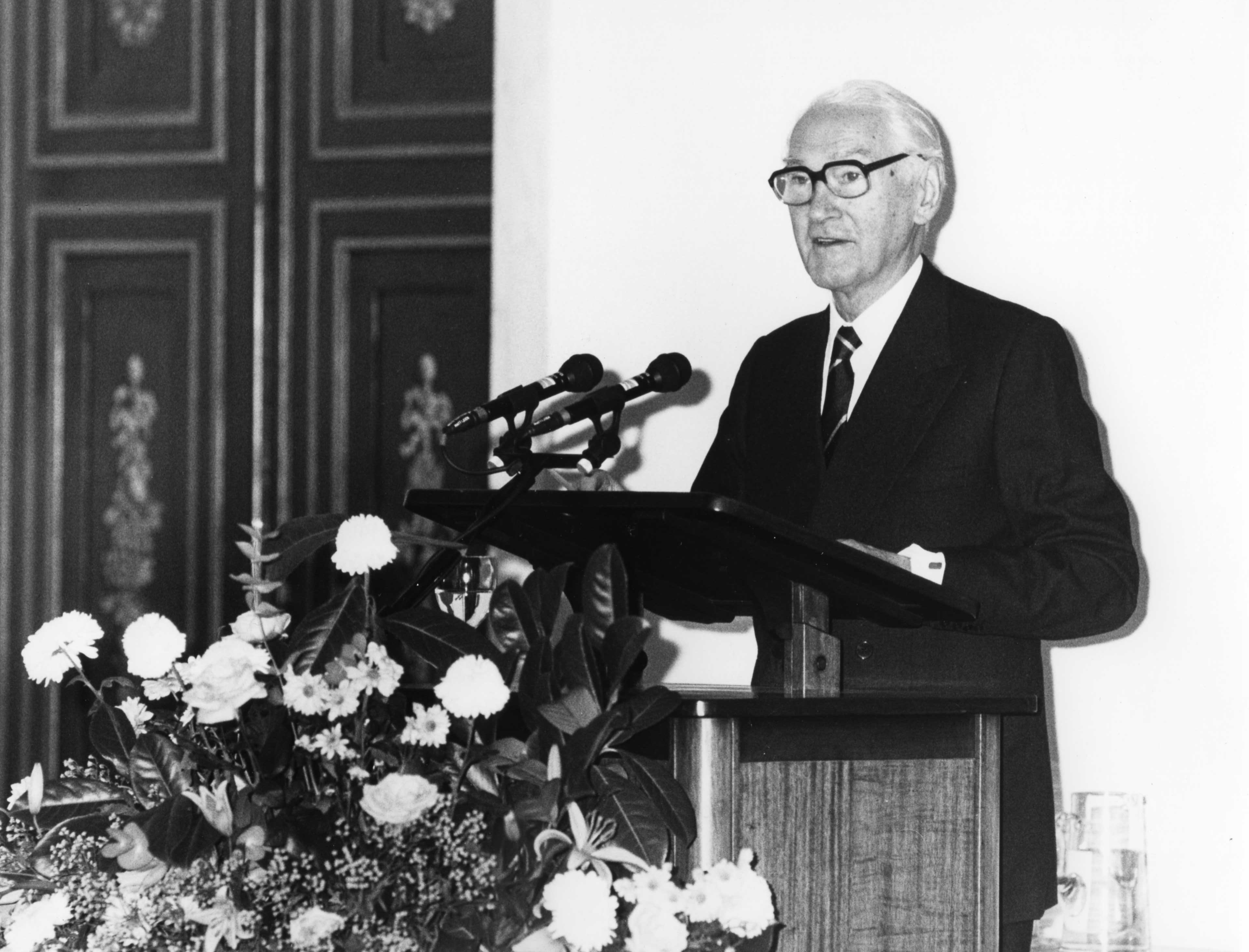
- MacDermot in 1989

Secretary-General of the International Commission of Jurists
- In office 1970–1990
- Preceded by: Seán MacBride
- Succeeded by: Adama Dieng

Minister of State for Housing and Local Government
- In office 29 August 1967 – 28 September 1968
- Prime Minister: Harold Wilson
- Preceded by: Frederick Willey
- Succeeded by: Denis Howell

Financial Secretary to the Treasury
- In office 21 October 1964 – 29 August 1967
- Prime Minister: Harold Wilson
- Preceded by: Alan Green
- Succeeded by: Harold Lever

Member of Parliament
- In office 17 April 1962 – 29 May 1970
- Preceded by: Clifford Wilcock
- Succeeded by: Phillip Whitehead
- Constituency: Derby North
- In office 14 February 1957 – 18 September 1959
- Preceded by: Austin Hudson
- Succeeded by: Christopher Chataway
- Constituency: Lewisham North

Personal details
- Born: 10 September 1916 Dublin, Ireland
- Died: 22 February 1996 (aged 79) Geneva, Switzerland
- Party: Labour (from 1956)
- Spouses: Violet Maxwell (m. 1940, dissolved) Ludmila Benvenuto (m. 1966)
- Children: 1
- Education: Corpus Christi College, Cambridge

Niall MacDermot CBE QC (10 September 1916 – 22 February 1996) was a British Labour politician.

MacDermot was educated at Rugby School and Corpus Christi College, Cambridge, and served in the Intelligence Corps during the Second World War. He was first elected to the House of Commons as Member of Parliament (MP) for Lewisham North, at a by-election in 1957 following the death of Conservative MP Sir Austin Hudson.

MacDermot lost his seat two years later at the 1959 general election, and unsuccessfully contested the equivalent seat at the 1961 London County Council election. He returned to Parliament as MP for Derby North at a by-election in 1962.

He was Financial Secretary to the Treasury from 1964 to 1967, and retired from the Commons at the 1970 general election.

From 1970 to 1990, he was Secretary-General of the International Commission of Jurists, succeeding Seán MacBride.

He was the grandson of Hugh Hyacinth O'Rorke MacDermot, who served as Solicitor General for Ireland in 1885 and 1886, and as Attorney General for Ireland in 1892. He was also the nephew of Frank MacDermot, a Fine Gael politician.

== Notes ==
Parliament of the United Kingdom
Preceded by Sir Austin Hudson	Member of Parliament for Lewisham North; 1957–1959	Succeeded by Christopher Chataway
Preceded by Clifford Wilcock	Member of Parliament for Derby North; 1962–1970	Succeeded by Phillip Whitehead
Political offices
Preceded by Alan Green	Financial Secretary to the Treasury; 1964–1967	Succeeded by Harold Lever
