= 1962 Derby North by-election =

UK Parliamentary by-election

The 1962 Derby North by-election was held on 17 April 1962 after the death of the incumbent Labour MP, Clifford Wilcock. It was won by the Labour candidate Niall MacDermot.

Derby North by-election, 1962
Party	Candidate	Votes	%	±%
Labour	Niall MacDermot	16,497	49.4	−3.4
Liberal	Lyndon Irving	8,479	25.4	New
Conservative	T.M. Wray	7,502	22.5	−24.7
Independent	T. Lynch	886	2.7	New
Majority		8,018	24.0	+18.4
Turnout		33,364		
Labour hold		Swing		
