= Vicky Foxcroft =

British politician (born 1977)

Vicky Foxcroft MP
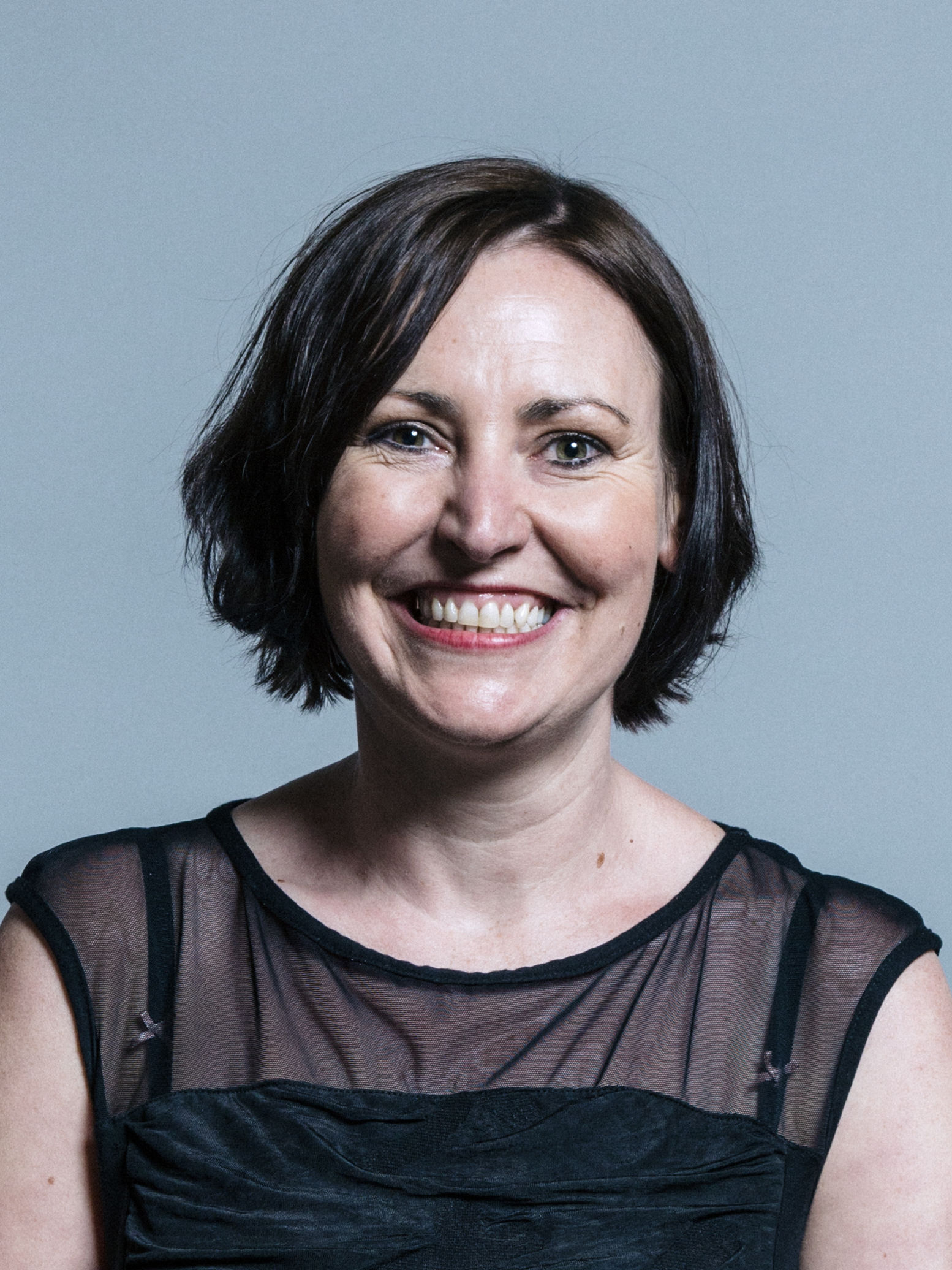
- Official portrait, 2017

Parliamentary Under-Secretary of State for Youth, Gambling, Digital Inclusion, Civil Society & Loneliness
- Incumbent
- Assumed office 22 July 2026
- Prime Minister: Andy Burnham
- Preceded by: Stephanie Peacock (Civil Society and Youth); The Baroness Twycross (Gambling)

Lord Commissioner of the Treasury
- In office 10 July 2024 – 19 June 2025
- Prime Minister: Keir Starmer

Member of Parliament for Lewisham North Lewisham Deptford (2015–2024)
- Incumbent
- Assumed office 7 May 2015
- Preceded by: Joan Ruddock
- Majority: 15,782 (35.8%)
Shadow portfolios
2020–2024	Disabled People
2019–2020	Civil Society
2015–2019	Whip

Member of Lewisham Council for Brockley
- In office 6 May 2010 – 22 May 2014

Personal details
- Born: Victoria Jane Foxcroft; 9 March 1977 (age 49) Chorley, Lancashire, England
- Party: Labour
- Education: De Montfort University (BA)
- Website: www.vickyfoxcroft.org.uk

Victoria Jane Foxcroft (born 9 March 1977) is a British Labour politician who has been the Member of Parliament (MP) for Lewisham North, previously Lewisham Deptford, since 2015. She is a former trade union official and was a Member of Lewisham Council from 2010 to 2014.

== Early life and career ==
Victoria Foxcroft was born on 9 March 1977 in Chorley. She experienced abuse during her childhood. She studied for a Bachelor of Arts degree in Drama and Business Studies at De Montfort University between 1996 and 2000.

Foxcroft has been a Labour member since 1997, and has sat on the Party's National Policy Forum. From 2010 until May 2014 she was a local councillor for the Brockley ward on Lewisham Council.

In 2002, Foxcroft became an officer at the Amalgamated Engineering and Electrical Union (AEEU), continuing through the merger of the AEEU into Amicus in 2001, and the merger of Amicus into Unite the Union in 2007. She was a research officer from 2002 to 2005; a political officer from 2005 to 2009, and a finance sector officer from 2009 until 2015.

== Parliamentary career ==
At the 2015 general election, Foxcroft was elected to Parliament as MP for Lewisham Deptford with 60.2% of the vote and a majority of 21,516. Foxcroft made her maiden speech in a debate on the Scotland Bill on 8 June 2015, in which she quoted lyrics from The Red Flag.

Following the election of Jeremy Corbyn as Labour leader in September 2015, Foxcroft was appointed as a whip.

She supported Owen Smith in the 2016 Labour leadership election.

In 2016, Foxcroft established the cross-party Youth Violence Commission, which she continues to chair.

At the snap 2017 general election, Foxcroft was re-elected as MP for Lewisham Deptford with an increased vote share of 77% and an increased majority of 34,899.

In June 2019 Foxcroft was promoted to become Shadow Minister for Civil Society.

At the 2019 general election, Foxcroft was again re-elected, with a decreased vote share of 70.8% and a decreased majority of 32,913.

Foxcroft endorsed Lisa Nandy in the 2020 Labour leadership election.

Foxcroft supports lowering the voting age to 16, co-chairing the All-Party Parliamentary Group for Votes at 16.

Foxcroft asked in April 2021 what is thought to be the first ever question at Prime Minister's Questions in British Sign Language, bringing attention to the absence of a sign language interpreter at Boris Johnson's press briefings. While press briefings are broadcast with an on-screen interpreter, Foxcroft expressed concern about the lack of an on-platform interpreter. There have been several legal challenges to this end claiming the government is violating human rights law.

Due to the 2023 review of Westminster constituencies, Foxcroft's constituency of Lewisham Deptford was abolished, and replaced with Lewisham North. At the 2024 general election, Foxcroft was elected to Parliament as MP for Lewisham North with 57.7% of the vote and a majority of 15,782.

Foxcroft served as Lord Commissioner of the Treasury in the Starmer ministry from 2024 until her resignation in June 2025, citing opposition to the government's planned cuts to disability benefits.

Parliament of the United Kingdom
Preceded by Joan Ruddock	Member of Parliament for Lewisham Deptford; 2015–2024	Constituency abolished
New constituency	Member of Parliament for Lewisham North; 2024–present	Incumbent
