= Bob Laxton =

British politician

Member of Parliament for Derby North
- In office 1 May 1997 – 12 April 2010
- Preceded by: Greg Knight
- Succeeded by: Chris Williamson

Personal details
- Born: 7 September 1944 (age 82) Derby, Derbyshire, England
- Party: Labour

Robert Laxton (born 7 September 1944) is a British Labour Party politician who was the member of parliament (MP) for Derby North from 1997 until standing down at the 2010 general election.

== Early life and education ==
Laxton attended the Woodlands Secondary Modern School (became the Woodlands Community School) on Blenheim Drive in Allestree. He also attended the Derby College of Art and Technology.

== Career ==
Laxton was a telecommunications engineer for the General Post Office from 1961. Whilst in this employment, he was a union representative and branch official for the Post Office Engineering Union, which became the National Communications Union in 1985, and finally the Communication Workers Union in 1995.

Prior to becoming an MP, he was leader of Derby City Council from 1986 to 1988 and again from 1994 to 1997. He was first elected to the city council in 1979.

=== Parliamentary career ===
During the 2001 Parliament he served as parliamentary private secretary to Alan Johnson, an old friend from his days as a union official who was Higher Education Minister and then Secretary of State for Work and Pensions before resigning from this role in 2005 to become a British representative on the Council of Europe.

He was chair of the Waterways All-Party Parliamentary Group.

On 19 October 2009, Laxton announced his intention to stand down at the next general election.

Parliament of the United Kingdom
Preceded by Greg Knight	Member of Parliament for Derby North; 1997–2010	Succeeded by Chris Williamson
