= Alison Noble =

British engineer (born 1965)

Alison Noble CBE FRS FREng FIET
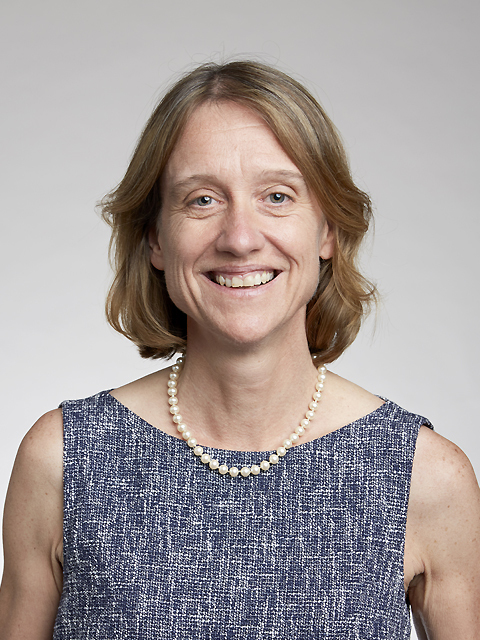
- Noble in 2017
- Born: 28 January 1965 (age 61); Nottingham, England
- Education: Maidstone Grammar School for Girls
- Alma mater: University of Oxford (BA, DPhil)
- Scientific career
- Fields: Medical image analysis; Ultrasound; Cardiovascular imaging; Oncological imaging; Obstetric imaging; Perinatal imaging
- Institutions: University of Oxford; General Electric Corporate R&D Center; Intelligent Ultrasound Ltd.
- Thesis: Descriptions of image surfaces (1989)
- Doctoral advisor: J. Michael Brady
- Website: ibme.ox.ac.uk/research/biomedia/people/professor-alison-noble

Julia Alison Noble (born 28 January 1965) is a British engineer. She has been Technikos Professor of Biomedical Engineering at the University of Oxford and a fellow of St Hilda's College since 2011, and Associate Head of the Mathematical, Physical and Life Sciences Division at the university. As of 2017, she is the chief technology officer of Intelligent Ultrasound Limited, an Oxford spin-off in medical imaging that she cofounded. She was director of the Oxford Institute of Biomedical Engineering (IBME) from 2012 to 2016. In 2023 she became the Foreign Secretary of The Royal Society (jointly with Mark Walport).

== Education ==
Julia Alison Noble was born on 28 January 1965 in Nottingham, England, to James Bryan Noble and Patricia Ann Noble. She was educated at Maidstone Grammar School for Girls in Kent and was an undergraduate student at St Hugh's College, Oxford, where she was awarded a first-class Bachelor of Arts degree in Engineering Science in 1986 followed by a Doctor of Philosophy degree in 1989 for research on computer vision and image segmentation supervised by J. Michael Brady.

== Career and research ==
Noble started her career as a research scientist at the General Electric Corporate R&D Center in Schenectady, New York, where she worked from 1989 to 1994 on developing inspection systems for aircraft engines. She returned to the University of Oxford as a lecturer in 1995 to work on medical applications of computer vision and was promoted to Professor in 2001, as the first female Statutory Professor in Engineering at Oxford.

Noble has made contributions to medical image computing, where her research interests combine knowledge of medical imaging and computational science to support decision-making in clinical medicine. Her research has advanced understanding of automatic extraction of clinically useful information from medical ultrasound scans and developed machine learning solutions to key problems in biomedical image analysis.

Noble has supervised or co-supervised over 50 successful PhD students to completion including Miklós Gyöngy, Nathan Cahill, Ramón Casero Cañas, and Grace Vesom. Her research has been funded by the European Research Council (ERC), the Medical Research Council (MRC), the Engineering and Physical Sciences Research Council (EPSRC) and the National Institute for Health Research (NIHR).

As part of her work in AI she co-founded the Oxford University spin-out, Intelligent Ultrasound, with her longstanding collaborator, Aris Papageorghiou.

=== Honours and awards ===
Noble was elected a Fellow of the Royal Society (FRS) in 2017. She was appointed Officer of the Order of the British Empire (OBE) in the 2013 Birthday Honours, elected a Fellow of the Royal Academy of Engineering (FREng) in 2008 and a Fellow of the Institution of Engineering and Technology (FIET) in 2001. Noble was promoted to Commander of the Order of the British Empire (CBE) in the 2023 Birthday Honours for services to engineering and biomedical imaging.

She is a trustee of the Oxford Trust, a charity established by the founders of Oxford Instruments to encourage the study, application and communication of science, technology, engineering, and mathematics. She is also a trustee of the Institution of Engineering and Technology and served as President of the Medical Image Computing and Computer-Assisted Interventions (MICCAI) Society from 2013 to 2016. As of 2017, Noble is an Honorary Fellow of Oriel College, Oxford, and is a MICCAI Society Fellow. She was the first recipient of the Laura Bassi Award of the International Federation of Medical and Biological Engineering in 2015. Previously she was a fellow of Wolfson College, Oxford, from 2005 to 2011. In 2018 she presented the Woolmer Lecture. In 2019, Professor Noble was awarded the Gabor Medal by the Royal Society "for developing solutions to a number of key problems in biomedical image analysis and substantially advancing automatic extraction of clinically useful information from medical ultrasound scans".

== Personal life ==
Noble was a coxswain for the Oxford University Women's Lightweight Rowing Club in the Henley Boat Races in 1985.
