= Coray Colina =

Professor of Chemistry

Coray Colina is a professor emeritus of Chemistry at the University of Florida.

== Education ==
Colina received her BS in 1993 and MS in 1994 at Simón Bolívar University in Venezuela. She earned her PhD at North Carolina State University in 2004 advised by her frequent coauthor Keith E. Gubbins, and subsequently worked as a Postdoctoral researcher at the University of North Carolina at Chapel Hill.

== Career ==
Colina was a faculty member Simón Bolívar University before she joined Pennsylvania State University in 2007, and then moved to University of Florida in 2015.

There, she heads the Colina Group, the Computational Biophysics and Soft Materials Research Group at the University of Florida. The organization works to "understand and predict structure-property relations in functional materials, such as polymeric membranes, biomolecules, and alternative ionic liquids."

Colina acted as the chair of the Computational Molecular Science & Engineering Forum (CoMSEF) of the American Institute of Chemical Engineers (AIChE) in 2014–2016, after having been a CoMSEF liaison director in 2009–2011. Colina was elected to the board of directors of the Materials Research Society (MRS) in 2019.

Colina is also on the editorial advisory board of ACS Macro Letters, as well as Macromolecules.

== Awards and honors ==
Colina's honors include:

- 1999 Award for Outstanding Teaching Achievement (Simón Bolívar University)
- 2019 Cooperative Research Award in Applied Polymer Science

== Selected works ==
- Frank T. Willmore, Eric Jankowski, Coray Colina, "Introduction to Scientific and Technical Computing", CRC Press, 2016
- Silvia Siquier, Coray Colina, "Aprendiendo termodinámica", Editorial Equinoccio, Colección Paraninfo, 2017
- Coray M. Colina, et al., "Python Simulation Interface for Molecular Modeling"
- Coray Colina, et al., "Force Field Database"
