= 1957 Lewisham North by-election =

UK parliamentary by-election

The 1957 Lewisham North by-election of 14 February 1957 was held following the death of Conservative Member of Parliament (MP) Sir Austin Hudson, 1st Baronet the previous year. In a defeat for the Conservative government, the seat was gained by the Labour Party.

== Candidates ==
The Conservative Party chose Norman Farmer as their candidate for the seat, which had been held by the party since its creation in 1950.

The Labour Party candidate was Niall MacDermot, the son of an Irish barrister. Himself a successful lawyer, he had only joined the party the previous year after fearing that his involvement in an earlier manslaughter case would preclude any political ambitions. MacDermot's mentor within the party, Elwyn Jones, persuaded him to run for election.

Leslie Greene ran as an "independent loyalist" candidate. Although an independent she was actively supported by the right-wing pressure group the League of Empire Loyalists. Greene, the group's organising secretary, had gained notoriety the previous year when she interrupted a speech by Anthony Eden, typical of the sort of headline-grabbing stunt favoured by the group at the time.

== Result of the previous general election ==
Results from the previous general election were:

General election 1955: Lewisham North
Party	Candidate	Votes	%	±%
Conservative	Austin Hudson	22,070	53.96	+0.50
Labour	ST Williams	18,834	46.04	−0.50
Majority		3,236	7.92	+1.00
Turnout		40,904	77.93	−6.09
Conservative hold		Swing		

== Result of the by-election ==
The results of the by-election were as follows:

United Kingdom Parliament: Lewisham North by-election 1957
Party	Candidate	Votes	%	±%
Labour	Niall MacDermot	18,516	49.50	+3.46
Conservative	Norman Farmer	17,406	46.53	−7.43
Independent loyalist	Leslie Greene	1,487	3.97	New
Majority		1,110	2.97	N/A
Turnout		37,409		
Labour gain from Conservative		Swing	+5.44	
