= Clifford Wilcock =

British politician (1898–1962)

Clifford Wilcock OBE AFC FRAeS MP
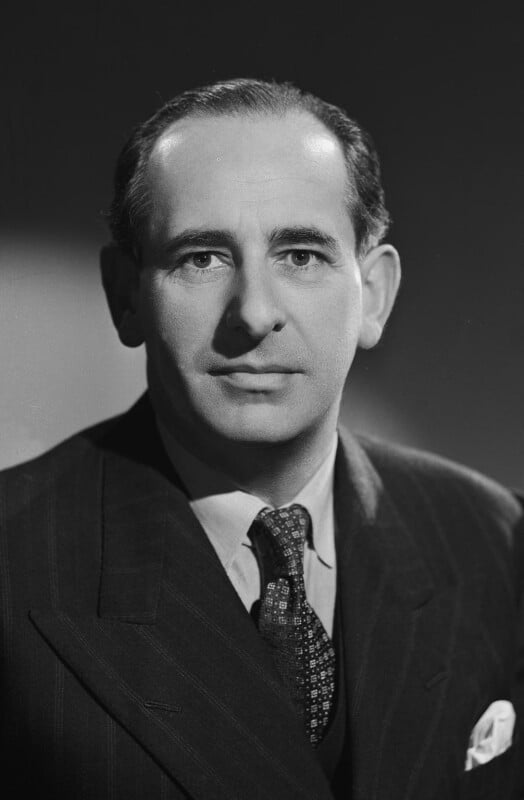
- Wilcock in 1947

Member of Parliament for Derby
- In office 1945–1950 Serving with Philip Noel-Baker
- Preceded by: William Reid; Philip Noel-Baker
- Succeeded by: Constituency divided

Member of Parliament for Derby North
- In office 1950–1962
- Preceded by: New constituency
- Succeeded by: Niall MacDermot

Personal details
- Born: 28 April 1898 Luton, Bedfordshire, England
- Died: 14 January 1962 (aged 63) Westminster, London, England
- Party: Labour
- Education: St Dunstan's College
- Alma mater: University of Edinburgh
- Military career
- Allegiance: United Kingdom
- Branch: British Army; Royal Air Force
- Service years: 1912–1918; 1921–1938; 1939–1945
- Rank: Group Captain
- Units: 14th London Regiment (London Scottish); Queen's Royal West Surrey Regiment; Royal Flying Corps
- Conflicts: World War I; Second Battle of Ypres; World War II
- Awards: Air Force Cross

Group Captain Clifford Arthur Bowman Wilcock, OBE, AFC, FRAeS (28 April 1898 – 14 January 1962) was a British engineer, company director and politician who is noted for his contributions to civil and military aviation.

== Great War service ==
Born in Luton, Bedfordshire, Wilcock was educated at St Dunstan's College in Catford. He had joined the 14th London Regiment (London Scottish) in 1912 and served with them in the First World War, later transferring to the Queen's Royal West Surrey Regiment. Wounded at Ypres, he was seconded into the Royal Flying Corps in June 1917 on his recovery, and he became a founding member of the Royal Air Force. He won the Air Force Cross in 1919.

== Royal Air Force ==
At the end of the war Wilcock studied engineering at the University of Edinburgh before rejoining the RAF with no. 208 Squadron in Egypt and Constantinople from 1921 to 1923. He alternated between home postings dealing with administration, and engineering work on RAF bases (including in Iraq until 1932). Among his posts was assisting at the Experimental Establishment in Felixstowe. From July 1935 he was on administrative duties at Ruislip, where he founded one of the first Royal Air Force Volunteer Reserve Squadrons in 1937.

== Second World War ==
Retiring in September 1938 with the rank of Group Captain, Wilcock became a broker and underwriter at Lloyd's of London. He was a Freeman of the City of London. On the outbreak of the Second World War he offered his services and was made an Air Ministry civil servant (deputy director of Manning), and ultimately rose to Senior Personnel Officer for RAF Transport Command. He was awarded the OBE in 1944.

== Parliament ==
A member of the Labour Party and the Fabian Society since 1921, Wilcock was chosen in February 1945 as one of the Labour candidates for Derby, a two-member constituency. He and his fellow candidate Philip Noel-Baker won the seat in the 1945 general election with majorities over 20,000. After the Boundary Commission split Derby into two single-member seats, Wilcock was elected for Derby North from 1950.

He specialised in aviation issues, and was Chairman of a departmental committee on training and recruitment for civil aviation from 1946 to 1949. He was also made a Director of several aviation companies, including Derby Aviation. Moderate in his politics, Wilcock was not a frequent speaker in the House of Commons, but he was respected for his knowledge of his subject. He was made a Fellow of the Royal Aeronautical Society and also developed an interest in health, being a member of the Medical Research Council and a Governor of Westminster Hospital.

He had six children. He died in Westminster.

Parliament of the United Kingdom
Preceded by William Reid and Philip Noel-Baker	Member of Parliament for Derby; 1945–1950; With: Philip Noel-Baker	Constituency divided
New constituency	Member of Parliament for Derby North; 1950–1962	Succeeded by Niall MacDermot
