= Greg Knight =

British Conservative politician

The Right Honourable Sir Greg Knight
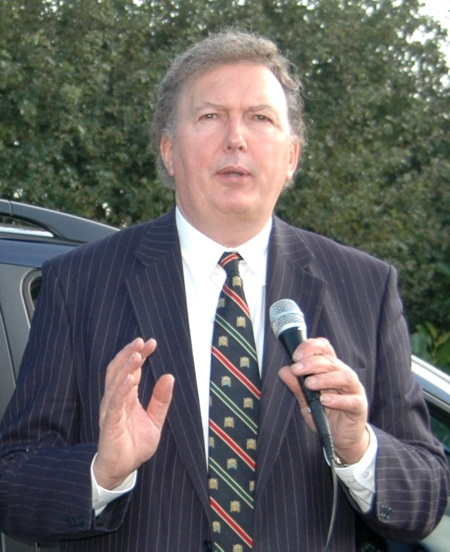
- Knight in 2009

Junior Government Whip Vice-Chamberlain of the Household
- In office 4 September 2012 – 7 October 2013
- Prime Minister: David Cameron
- Preceded by: Mark Francois
- Succeeded by: Desmond Swayne

Minister of State for Industry
- In office 23 July 1996 – 2 May 1997
- Prime Minister: John Major
- Preceded by: Timothy Eggar
- Succeeded by: John Battle

Government Deputy Chief Whip in the House of Commons Treasurer of the Household
- In office 7 June 1993 – 23 July 1996
- Prime Minister: John Major
- Preceded by: David Heathcoat-Amory
- Succeeded by: Andrew MacKay

Lord Commissioner of the Treasury
- In office 25 July 1990 – 27 May 1993
- Prime Minister: Margaret Thatcher; John Major
- Preceded by: Michael Fallon
- Succeeded by: Andrew MacKay

Member of Parliament
- In office 7 June 2001 – 30 May 2024
- Preceded by: John Townend
- Succeeded by: Constituency abolished
- Constituency: East Yorkshire
- In office 9 June 1983 – 8 April 1997
- Preceded by: Phillip Whitehead
- Succeeded by: Bob Laxton
- Constituency: Derby North

Personal details
- Born: Gregory Knight; 4 April 1949 (age 77) Blaby, Leicestershire, England
- Party: Conservative
- Spouse: Janet Ormond
- Education: The College of Law
- Profession: Solicitor
- Website: www.gregknight.com

Sir Gregory Knight (born 4 April 1949) is a British politician, author and musician. He served as the Conservative MP for East Yorkshire from 2001 to 2024, having previously served as the MP for Derby North from 1983 to 1997. He also served as a minister in the governments of Margaret Thatcher, John Major and David Cameron.

== Education and professional life ==
Born in Blaby, Leicestershire, Knight was educated at Alderman Newton's Grammar School, Leicester, and the College of Law Guildford, qualifying as a solicitor in 1973.

== Political career ==
Knight served as a Leicester City Councillor for Castle Ward and Leicestershire County Councillor for Evington Division from 1976 to 1981.

He was MP for Derby North from 1983 until the 1997 election, when he lost his seat. He returned to the House of Commons in 2001 after successfully contesting the East Yorkshire seat.

As a backbencher, in the 1980s, he succeeded in amending licensing law in England and Wales by doubling 'drinking up time' on licensed premises from ten to twenty minutes, a concession that was welcomed by the industry and drinkers alike. However the 2003 Licensing Act ended standard permitted hours and provides for an unspecified drinking up time determined by the licensee's discretion.

He is in favour of bringing back capital punishment and spoke out against the apartheid government of South Africa during the 1980s.

He was deputy Chief Whip under John Major between 1993 and 1996 and Minister of State for Industry at the Department of Trade and Industry from 1996 until the Conservative defeat at the 1997 election. He was made a Privy Councillor in 1995, entitling him to the style "Right Honourable".

He served under Michael Howard as a shadow minister for Environment and Transport until 2005. In the 2005–10 Parliament, he was chairman of the House of Commons Procedure Committee and on four other House of Commons select committees: the Liaison Committee, Administration Committee, the Committee on Modernisation of the House and the Standards and Privileges Committee. He was re-elected unopposed to the chair of the Procedure Committee in 2010.

In 2009, The Daily Telegraph reported that Knight had claimed £2,600 in expenses for "driveway repairs" at his constituency home, though Knight stated that his cars were kept separately and paid for out of his own pocket.

Knight has successfully piloted two of his Private Members Bills into law. In 2011, he was successful in taking through Parliament the Estates of Deceased Persons (Forfeiture Rule and Law of Succession) Act 2011, a bill to make the distribution of estates fairer.

He rejoined the government in September 2012 as a senior whip and Vice Chamberlain of the Royal Household, a position he held until October 2013.

Knight is a Eurosceptic and is in favour of Brexit.

In 2018, he introduced his second Private Member's Bill, the Parking (Code of Practice) Bill, which mandates the Government to introduce a statutory code of practice for the operators of private car parks, to require transparency and good practice to ensure that motorists are not treated unreasonably. The bill was passed by Parliament and became an Act in March 2019.

Knight has argued in Parliament for "double summertime", which would see the clocks go forward by two hours during summer.

He is Secretary of the British American Parliamentary Group, one of the largest and most active all-party groups at Westminster. An avid motorist, he is critical of initiatives seen as 'anti-car', such as congestion charging, pedestrianisation schemes, speed humps and some 'park and ride' proposals. He is chairman of the All-Party Parliamentary Historic Vehicles Group and successfully called on the Government to exempt historic vehicles from MOT tests.

In 2011, he was shortlisted as the 'Industry Champion of the Year' by the International Historic Motoring Awards, for his work in supporting the historic and classic car movement.

Knight announced in June 2023 that he would stand down at the 2024 general election.

== Personal life ==
He plays the drums and is a founder member of MP4—the world's only parliamentary rock group. The others are fellow former MPs Kevin Brennan and Ian Cawsey and Peter Wishart MP. Whilst he was a Leicester councillor, he co-wrote and played on "It's a Leicester Fiesta" (1979).

He has backed several other artists on the drums in live shows including George McCrae and Fergal Sharkey and, in the studio, he played drums backing KT Tunstall, Steve Harley, Ricky Wilson and David Gray on the charity single "You Can't Always Get What You Want" released in December 2016 by Chrysalis Records.

== Honours ==
- (United Kingdom) In 1995, he was sworn in as a member of Her Majesty's Most Honourable Privy Council. This gave him the Honorific Title "The Right Honourable" for life.
- (United Kingdom) In October 2013, he was awarded a Knighthood for political service. This gave him the Honorific Title "Sir" for life.

== Publications ==
- Westminster Words (1988), published by Buchan and Enright
- Honourable Insults (1990), published by Robson Books
- Parliamentary Sauce (1993), published by Robson Books
- Right Honourable Insults (1998), published by Chrysalis Books
- Naughty Graffiti (2005), published by Anova Books
- Dishonourable Insults (2011), published by The Robson Press (ISBN 9781849541619)

Parliament of the United Kingdom
Preceded by Phillip Whitehead	Member of Parliament for Derby North; 1983–1997	Succeeded by Bob Laxton
Preceded by John Townend	Member of Parliament for East Yorkshire; 2001–2024	Constituency abolished
Government offices
Preceded by David Heathcoat-Amory	Treasurer of the Household; 1993–1996	Succeeded by Andrew MacKay
Preceded by Mark Francois	Vice-Chamberlain of the Household; 2012–2013	Succeeded by Desmond Swayne
Party political offices
Preceded by David Heathcoat-Amory	Conservative Deputy Chief Whip in the House of Commons; 1993–1996	Succeeded by Andrew MacKay
