= PC-SAFT =

PC-SAFT (perturbed chain SAFT) is an equation of state that is based on statistical associating fluid theory (SAFT). Like other SAFT equations of state, it makes use of chain and association terms developed by Chapman, et al from perturbation theory. However, unlike earlier SAFT equations of state that used unbonded spherical particles as a reference fluid, it uses spherical particles in the context of hard chains as reference fluid for the dispersion term.

PC-SAFT was developed by Joachim Gross and Gabriele Sadowski, and was first presented in their 2001 article. Further research extended PC-SAFT for use with associating and polar molecules, and it has also been modified for use with polymers. A version of PC-SAFT has also been developed to describe mixtures with ionic compounds (called electrolyte PC-SAFT or ePC-SAFT).

== Form of the Equation of State ==
The equation of state is organized into terms that account for different types of intermolecular interactions, including terms for

- the hard chain reference
- dispersion
- association
- polar interactions
- ions

The equation is most often expressed in terms of the residual Helmholtz energy because all other thermodynamic properties can be easily found by taking the appropriate derivatives of the Helmholtz energy.

$$a = a^\text{hc} + a^\text{disp} + a^\text{assoc} + a^\text{dipole} + a^\text{ion}$$

Here $a$ is the molar residual Helmholtz energy.

=== Hard Chain Term ===
$$\frac{a^\text{hc}}{kT} = \overline{m} \cdot a^\text{hs} - \sum_{i=1}^{NC} {x_i \cdot (m_i-1) \cdot \ln(g^\text{hs}_{i,i}) }$$

where

- $NC$ is the number of compounds;
- $x_i$ is the mole fraction;
- $\overline{m} = \sum_{i=1}^{NC} {x_i m_i}$ is the average number of segments in the mixture;
- $a^\text{hs}$ is the Boublík-Mansoori-Leeland-Carnahan-Starling hard sphere equation of state, defined as:

$a^\text{hs} = \zeta_0 \left ( \frac{3\zeta_1\zeta_2}{1-\zeta_3} + \frac{\zeta_2^3}{\zeta_3(1-\zeta_3)^2} + \frac{\zeta_2^3}{\zeta_3^2 - \zeta_0}\log{(1 - \zeta_3)} \right )$

$\zeta_k = \sum_i{x_i m_i d_i^k}$

$d_i = \sigma_i \left ( 1 - 0.12\exp{\left ( \frac{-3\epsilon_i}{kT} \right )}\right )$, where $k$ is the Boltzmann constant. $g^\text{hs}_{i,i}$ is the hard sphere radial distribution function at contact.:
$$g^\text{hs}_{i,j} = \frac{1}{1 - \zeta_3} + \frac{3 \zeta_2}{(1 - \zeta_3)^2}\left ( \frac{d_{i} d_{j}}{d_{i}+d_{j} } \right ) + \frac{2 \zeta_2^2}{(1 - \zeta_3)^3}\left ( \frac{d_{i} d_{j}}{d_{i}+d_{j} } \right )^2$$

=== Dispersion Term ===
$a^\text{disp} = -2\pi \N_A \rho I_1 \overline{m^2 \epsilon \sigma^3} - \overline{m} \N_A \rho I_2 \overline{m^2 \epsilon^2 \sigma^3}$

$\overline{m^2 \epsilon \sigma^3} = \sum_i\sum_j{x_i x_j m_i m_j \frac{\epsilon_{ij}}{kT}\sigma_{ij}^3}$

$\overline{m^2 \epsilon^2 \sigma^3} = \sum_i\sum_j{x_i x_j m_i m_j \left ( \frac{\epsilon_{ij}}{kT} \right )^{2} \sigma_{ij}^3}$

Where $N_{A}$ is the Avogadro constant, $\rho$ is the molar density, and $I_1$, $I_2$ are the analytical functions representing the integrals of the radial distribution function in 1st and 2nd order perturbation terms:

$I_1 = \sum_{i = 0}^{i = 6}{\left ( a_{0i} + \frac{\overline{m} - 1}{\overline{m}} a_{1i} + \frac{\overline{m} - 1}{\overline{m}}\frac{\overline{m} - 2}{\overline{m}} a_{2i}\right )\zeta_3^i}$

$I_2 = \sum_{i = 0}^{i = 6}{\left ( b_{0i} + \frac{\overline{m} - 1}{\overline{m}} b_{1i} + \frac{\overline{m} - 1}{\overline{m}}\frac{\overline{m} - 2}{\overline{m}} b_{2i}\right )\zeta_3^i}$

$b_{ji}$, $a_{ji}$ are universal model parameters:

	$a_{0i}$	$a_{1i}$	$a_{2i}$	$b_{0i}$	$b_{1i}$	$b_{2i}$
0	0.9105631445	-0.3084016918	-0.0906148351	0.7240946941	-0.5755498075	0.0976883116
1	0.6361281449	0.1860531159	0.4527842806	2.2382791861	0.6995095521	-0.2557574982
2	2.6861347891	-2.5030047259	0.5962700728	-4.0025849485	3.8925673390	-9.1558561530
3	-26.547362491,	21.419793629	-1.7241829131	-21.003576815	-17.215471648	20.642075974
4	97.759208784	-65.255885330	-4.1302112531	26.855641363	192.67226447	-38.804430052
5	-159.59154087	83.318680481	13.776631870	206.55133841	-161.82646165	93.626774077
6	91.297774084	-33.746922930	-8.6728470368	-355.60235612	-165.20769346	-29.666905585

To obtain $\epsilon_{ij}$ and $\sigma_{ij}$, the following mixing rules are used:

$\epsilon_{ij} = (1 - k_{ij})\sqrt{\epsilon_i \epsilon_j}$

$\sigma_{ij} = (1 - l_{ij})\frac{\sigma_i + \sigma_j}{2}$

Were $k_{ij}$ and $l_{ij}$ interaction parameters, obtaining via fitting binary mixture data.

=== Association Term ===
$a^\text{assoc} = \sum_{i = 1}^{n_{c}}{x_{i}\sum_{a = 1}^{n_{s}}{ n_{i,a}\left (\log{X_{i,a}} - \frac{X_{i,a}}{2} + \frac{1}{2}\right )}}$

Where $X_{i,a}$ is the fraction of non-bonded sites of type $a$ in component $i$, and $n_{i,a}$ is the number of sites of type $a$ in component $i$. $X_{i,a}$ is the solution of the following system of equations:

$X_{i,a} = \frac{1}{1 + \sum_{j = 1}^{n_{c}}{\sum_{b = 1}^{n _{s}}{\rho x_j n_{j,b} X_{j,b} \Delta_{ij,ab} }}}$

Where $\Delta_{ij,ab}$ is the association strength between sites of type $a$ in component $i$, and sites of type $b$ in component $j$. In the specific case of PC-SAFT, $\Delta_{ij,ab}$ is defined as:

$\Delta_{ij,ab} = g^\text{hs}_{i,j}\sigma_{ij}^3\kappa_{ij,ab} \exp{\left ( \frac{\epsilon^{\text{HB}}_{ij,ab}}{kT} - 1\right )}$

Where $\epsilon^{\text{HB}}_{ij,ab}$ is the hydrogen bonding energy and $\kappa_{ij,ab}$ is the bonding volume, between sites of type $a$ in component $i$, and sites of type $b$ in component $j$.
