= Derby North =

Parliamentary constituency in the United Kingdom, 1950 onwards

Coordinates: 52.95°N 1.49°W

- Borough constituency for the House of Commons
- Interactive map of boundaries since 2010
- Location within the East Midlands
- County: Derbyshire
- Electorate: 71,867 (March 2020)

Current constituency
- Created: 1950
- Member of Parliament: Catherine Atkinson (Labour)
- Seats: One
- Created from: Derby

Derby North (/ˈdɑːrbi/) is a constituency (Note: A borough constituency (for the purposes of election expenses and type of returning officer)) formed of part of the city of Derby, represented in the House of Commons of the UK Parliament since 2024 by Catherine Atkinson from the Labour Party. It was previously held by Amanda Solloway, a Conservative. (Note: As with all constituencies, the constituency elects one Member of Parliament (MP) by the first past the post system of election at least every five years.)

Between 1983 and 2005, the seat was a bellwether; in 2010 and 2017, the seat leaned more to the political left than the overall result. The seat was, relative to others, a marginal seat from 2001, as well as a swing seat, as its winner's majority had not exceeded 8.6% of the vote since the 15.9% majority won at that year's general election. The seat had changed hands twice since then. In the 2024 general election, that changed, with Atkinson winning with a majority of 21.4%.

== Constituency profile ==
Derby North is an entirely urban and suburban constituency located in Derbyshire and covers the western and northern neighbourhoods of the city of Derby. This includes the areas of Mickleover, Littleover, Mackworth Estate, Darley Abbey and Chaddesden. Derby is a centre for engineering, particularly in rail transport. The city has a large deaf community, second only to London. Parts of the constituency close to the city centre have high levels of deprivation, falling within the 10% most-deprived areas in England, whilst the suburbs of Mickleover and Darley Abbey are affluent.

Residents of Derby North are generally younger and have average levels of income, education and professional employment when compared to national averages. At the 2021 census, White people made up 80% of the population and Asians were the largest ethnic minority group at 11%. At the city council, the neighbourhoods close to the city centre are represented by Labour Party councillors, whilst Conservatives and Liberal Democrats were elected in the more wealthy south-west of the constituency. An estimated 54% of voters in Derby North supported leaving the European Union in the 2016 referendum, similar to the nationwide figure of 52%.

== Boundaries ==
=== Historic ===
Boundaries of Derby North from 1983 to 2010

1950–1955: The County Borough of Derby wards of Abbey, Babington, Becket, Bridge, Derwent, Friar Gate, King's Mead, and Rowditch.

1955–1974: The County Borough of Derby wards of Abbey, Babington, Becket, Bridge, Derwent, Friar Gate, King's Mead, and Rowditch, and the parish of Chaddesden in the Rural District of Shardlow.

1974–1983: The County Borough of Derby wards of Abbey, Allestree, Breadsall, Chaddesden, Darley, Derwent, Friar Gate, Mickleover, and Spondon.

1983–2010: The City of Derby wards of Abbey, Allestree, Breadsall, Chaddesden, Darley, Derwent, Mackworth, and Spondon.

2010–2023: The City of Derby wards of Abbey, Chaddesden, Darley, Derwent, Littleover, Mackworth, and Mickleover.

Boundary changes before the 2010 general election resulted in significant changes – removing three wards (Allestree, Spondon and Oakwood) to the newly created Mid Derbyshire seat. In their place, Littleover and Mickleover wards moved in from Derby South.

=== Current ===
Following a local government boundary review which came into effect in May 2023, the constituency now comprises the following wards of the City of Derby:

- Arboretum (very small part); Abbey (most), Chaddesden East, Chaddesden North (most), Chaddesden West, Darley (most), Littleover, Mackworth & New Zealand; Mickleover; Normanton (small part); Oakwood (small part).

The 2023 review of Westminster constituencies, which was based on the ward structure in place at 1 December 2020, left the boundaries unchanged.

== Members of Parliament ==
Derby prior to 1950

Election	Member	Party
1950	Clifford Wilcock	Labour
1962 by-election	Niall MacDermot	Labour
1970	Phillip Whitehead	Labour
1983	Greg Knight	Conservative
1997	Bob Laxton	Labour
2010	Chris Williamson	Labour
2015	Amanda Solloway	Conservative
2017	Chris Williamson	Labour
2019	Chris Williamson	Independent
2019	Chris Williamson	Labour
2019	Chris Williamson	Independent
2019	Amanda Solloway	Conservative
2024	Catherine Atkinson	Labour

== History ==
A seat contested relatively closely between the two largest parties since 1950, Derby North was held consecutively by the Labour Party's Clifford Wilcock, Niall MacDermot, and Phillip Whitehead. (Note: Whitehead was later an MEP) At the 1979 general election, it was covered by the BBC as the bellwether seat as the 41st of 41 seats that the Conservative Party needed to win; that year it stayed under control of Labour, but the Conservatives won the election regardless. Its exit poll was a central point of discussion of the BBC's election night coverage.

The Conservative Greg Knight gained the seat in 1983, and held it until 1997. (Note: Knight was Deputy Chief Whip from 1993 to 1996 and Minister for Industry from 1996 to 1997.)

Labour's Bob Laxton defeated Knight in 1997 and held the seat until retiring in 2010, when the seat was retained for Labour by Chris Williamson. In 2015, Amanda Solloway, a Conservative; gained the seat with a swing of 0.8%. The 2015 result gave the seat the second-most marginal majority (measured by percentage) of the Conservative Party's 331 seats. Williamson regained the seat in 2017. He was subsequently suspended from the Labour Party, and was blocked in November 2019 from running as a Labour candidate at the following election; he resigned from the party and stated his intention to run as an independent, but came sixth out of the six candidates as Solloway was returned.

== Elections ==
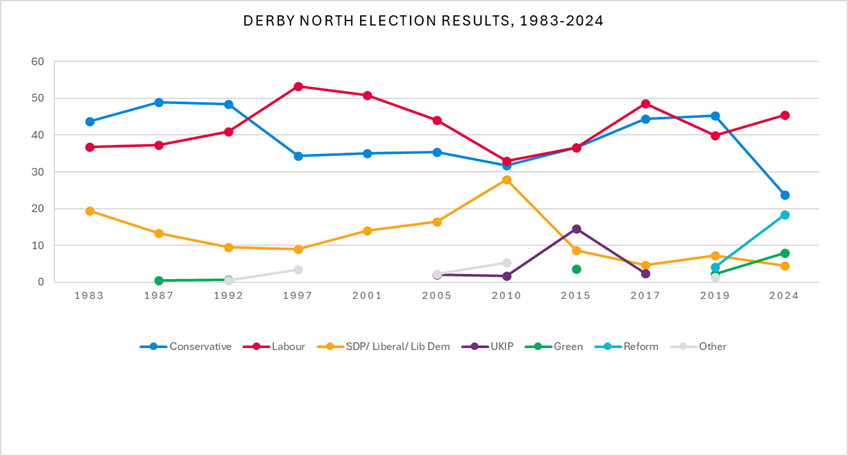
Derby North election results 1983-2024

=== Elections in the 2020s ===
General election 2024: Derby North
Party	Candidate	Votes	%	±%
Labour	Catherine Atkinson	18,619	45.5	+5.7
Conservative	Amanda Solloway	9,704	23.7	−21.5
Reform	Tim Prosser	7,488	18.3	+14.2
Green	Helen Hitchcock	3,286	8.0	+5.8
Liberal Democrats	John Sweeney	1,822	4.5	−2.8
Majority		8,915	21.8	N/A
Turnout		40,919	57.2	−7.0
Registered electors		71,900		
Labour gain from Conservative		Swing	+13.6	

=== Elections in the 2010s ===
General election 2019: Derby North
Party	Candidate	Votes	%	±%
Conservative	Amanda Solloway	21,259	45.2	+0.8
Labour	Tony Tinley	18,719	39.8	−8.7
Liberal Democrats	Greg Webb	3,450	7.3	+2.7
Brexit Party	Alan Graves	1,908	4.1	New
Green	Helen Hitchcock	1,046	2.2	New
Independent	Chris Williamson	635	1.4	−47.1
Majority		2,540	5.4	N/A
Turnout		47,017	64.2	−4.9
Conservative gain from Labour		Swing	+4.8	

Results of UK House of Commons seat Derby North, created 1950, since 2005

General election 2017: Derby North
Party	Candidate	Votes	%	±%
Labour	Chris Williamson	23,622	48.5	+11.9
Conservative	Amanda Solloway	21,607	44.4	+7.7
Liberal Democrats	Lucy Care	2,262	4.6	−4.0
UKIP	Bill Piper	1,181	2.4	−12.2
Majority		2,015	4.1	N/A
Turnout		48,672	69.1	0.0
Labour gain from Conservative		Swing	+2.1	

General election 2015: Derby North
Party	Candidate	Votes	%	±%
Conservative	Amanda Solloway	16,402	36.66	+5.0
Labour	Chris Williamson	16,361	36.57	+3.6
UKIP	Tilly Ward	6,532	14.6	+12.8
Liberal Democrats	Lucy Care	3,832	8.6	−19.4
Green	Alice Mason-Power	1,618	3.6	New
Majority		41	0.09	N/A
Turnout		44,745	69.1	+6.0
Conservative gain from Labour		Swing	+0.8	

General election 2010: Derby North
Party	Candidate	Votes	%	±%
Labour	Chris Williamson	14,896	33.0	−9.0
Conservative	Stephen Mold	14,283	31.7	+5.8
Liberal Democrats	Lucy Care	12,638	28.0	+0.5
BNP	Pete Cheeseman	2,000	4.4	New
UKIP	Elizabeth Ransome	829	1.8	−0.2
Independent	David Gale	264	0.6	New
Pirate	David Geraghty	170	0.4	New
Majority		613	1.4	−13.2
Turnout		45,080	63.1	
Labour hold		Swing	-7.4	

Boundary changes occurred in 2010, so percentage changes are based on notional results

=== Elections in the 2000s ===
General election 2005: Derby North
Party	Candidate	Votes	%	±%
Labour	Bob Laxton	19,272	44.0	−6.9
Conservative	Richard Aitken-Davies	15,515	35.4	+0.4
Liberal Democrats	Jeremy Beckett	7,209	16.5	+2.4
Veritas	Martin Bardoe	958	2.2	New
UKIP	Michelle Medgyesy	864	2.0	New
Majority		3,757	8.6	−7.3
Turnout		43,818	64.3	+6.5
Labour hold		Swing	-1.8	

General election 2001: Derby North
Party	Candidate	Votes	%	±%
Labour	Bob Laxton	22,415	50.9	−2.3
Conservative	Barry Holden	15,433	35.0	+0.8
Liberal Democrats	Robert Charlesworth	6,206	14.1	+5.1
Majority		6,982	15.9	−3.0
Turnout		44,054	57.8	−16.0
Labour hold		Swing	-1.5	

=== Elections in the 1990s ===
General election 1997: Derby North
Party	Candidate	Votes	%	±%
Labour	Bob Laxton	29,844	53.2	+12.3
Conservative	Gregory Knight	19,229	34.3	−14.1
Liberal Democrats	Robert Charlesworth	5,059	9.0	−0.6
Referendum	Paul Reynolds	1,816	3.2	New
ProLife Alliance	Jane H.M. Waters	195	0.3	New
Majority		10,615	18.9	N/A
Turnout		56,143	73.8	−6.9
Labour gain from Conservative		Swing	+13.2	

General election 1992: Derby North
Party	Candidate	Votes	%	±%
Conservative	Gregory Knight	28,574	48.4	−0.5
Labour	Bob Laxton	24,121	40.9	+3.7
Liberal Democrats	Robert Charlesworth	5,638	9.6	−3.8
Green	Eric Wall	383	0.7	+0.2
National Front	Peter Hart	245	0.4	New
Natural Law	N. Onley	58	0.1	New
Majority		4,453	7.5	−3.8
Turnout		59,019	80.7	+4.9
Conservative hold		Swing	−2.0	

=== Elections in the 1980s ===
General election 1987: Derby North
Party	Candidate	Votes	%	±%
Conservative	Gregory Knight	26,561	48.9	+5.2
Labour	Phillip Whitehead	20,236	37.2	+0.4
Liberal	Stephen Connolly	7,268	13.4	−6.1
Green	Eric Wall	291	0.5	New
Majority		6,325	11.7	+4.8
Turnout		54,356	75.8	+3.3
Conservative hold		Swing	+2.4	

General election 1983: Derby North
Party	Candidate	Votes	%	±%
Conservative	Gregory Knight	22,303	43.7	−0.8
Labour	Phillip Whitehead	18,797	36.8	−8.1
Liberal	Stephen Connolly	9,924	19.5	+10.0
Majority		3,506	6.9	+6.5
Turnout		51,024	72.5	−4.3
Conservative gain from Labour		Swing	+3.2	

=== Elections in the 1970s ===
General election 1979: Derby North
Party	Candidate	Votes	%	±%
Labour	Phillip Whitehead	28,797	44.9	+0.4
Conservative	R.N. Kemm	28,583	44.5	+6.9
Liberal	R.F. Whitehouse	6,093	9.5	−8.0
National Front	C. Bayliss	592	0.9	New
United English National	S.P. Gibson	116	0.2	New
Majority		214	0.4	−6.5
Turnout		64,181	76.8	+3.6
Labour hold		Swing	-3.3	

General election October 1974: Derby North
Party	Candidate	Votes	%	±%
Labour	Phillip Whitehead	26,960	44.5	+4.3
Conservative	D.J. Penfold	22,767	37.6	−0.6
Liberal	M.D. Peel	10,595	17.5	−4.1
More Prosperous Britain	Harold Smith	242	0.4	New
Majority		4,193	6.9	+4.9
Turnout		60,564	73.2	−5.9
Labour hold		Swing		

General election February 1974: Derby North
Party	Candidate	Votes	%	±%
Labour	Phillip Whitehead	26,029	40.2	−14.5
Conservative	D.J. Penfold	24,736	38.2	−7.1
Liberal	M.D. Peel	13,995	21.6	New
Majority		1,293	2.0	−7.4
Turnout		64,760	79.1	+6.9
Labour hold		Swing		

General election 1970: Derby North
Party	Candidate	Votes	%	±%
Labour	Phillip Whitehead	20,114	54.7	−7.1
Conservative	John W Roberts	16,635	45.3	+7.1
Majority		3,479	9.4	−14.2
Turnout		36,749	64.2	−6.6
Labour hold		Swing		

=== Elections in the 1960s ===
General election 1966: Derby North
Party	Candidate	Votes	%	±%
Labour	Niall MacDermot	23,033	61.8	+8.9
Conservative	Derek H Hene	14,215	38.2	+3.6
Majority		8,818	23.6	+5.3
Turnout		37,248	70.8	−3.6
Labour hold		Swing		

General election 1964: Derby North
Party	Candidate	Votes	%	±%
Labour	Niall MacDermot	21,386	52.9	+0.1
Conservative	Derek H Hene	13,991	34.6	−12.6
Liberal	Alfred Leslie Smart	5,057	12.5	N/A
Majority		7,395	18.3	+12.7
Turnout		40,434	74.4	−2.3
Labour hold		Swing		

1962 Derby North by-election
Party	Candidate	Votes	%	±%
Labour	Niall MacDermot	16,497	49.4	−3.4
Liberal	Lyndon Irving	8,479	25.4	New
Conservative	T.M. Wray	7,502	22.5	−24.7
Independent	T. Lynch	886	2.7	New
Majority		8,018	24.0	+18.4
Turnout		33,364		
Labour hold		Swing		

=== Elections in the 1950s ===
General election 1959: Derby North
Party	Candidate	Votes	%	±%
Labour	Clifford Wilcock	22,673	52.8	−3.0
Conservative	Robin Maxwell-Hyslop	20,266	47.2	+3.0
Majority		2,407	5.6	−6.0
Turnout		42,939	76.7	+1.0
Labour hold		Swing		

General election 1955: Derby North
Party	Candidate	Votes	%	±%
Labour	Clifford Wilcock	24,162	55.8	+0.6
Conservative	Rolla CP Rouse	19,156	44.2	+7.3
Majority		5,006	11.6	−6.7
Turnout		43,318	75.7	−9.8
Labour hold		Swing		

General election 1951: Derby North
Party	Candidate	Votes	%	±%
Labour	Clifford Wilcock	22,390	57.09	+1.89
Conservative	Victor Echevarri Waldron	16,828	42.91	+6.01
Majority		5,562	14.18	−4.12
Turnout		39,218	82.49	−3.01
Labour hold		Swing		

General election 1950: Derby North
Party	Candidate	Votes	%	±%
Labour	Clifford Wilcock	22,410	55.2	
Conservative	V. Seely	14,980	36.9	
Liberal	Gerald Ivan Walters	3,190	7.9	
Majority		7,430	18.3	
Turnout		40,580	85.5	
Labour win (new seat)				

== See also ==
- List of parliamentary constituencies in Derbyshire
