= George Jackson (chemist) =

British physical chemist

George Jackson FRS FRSC
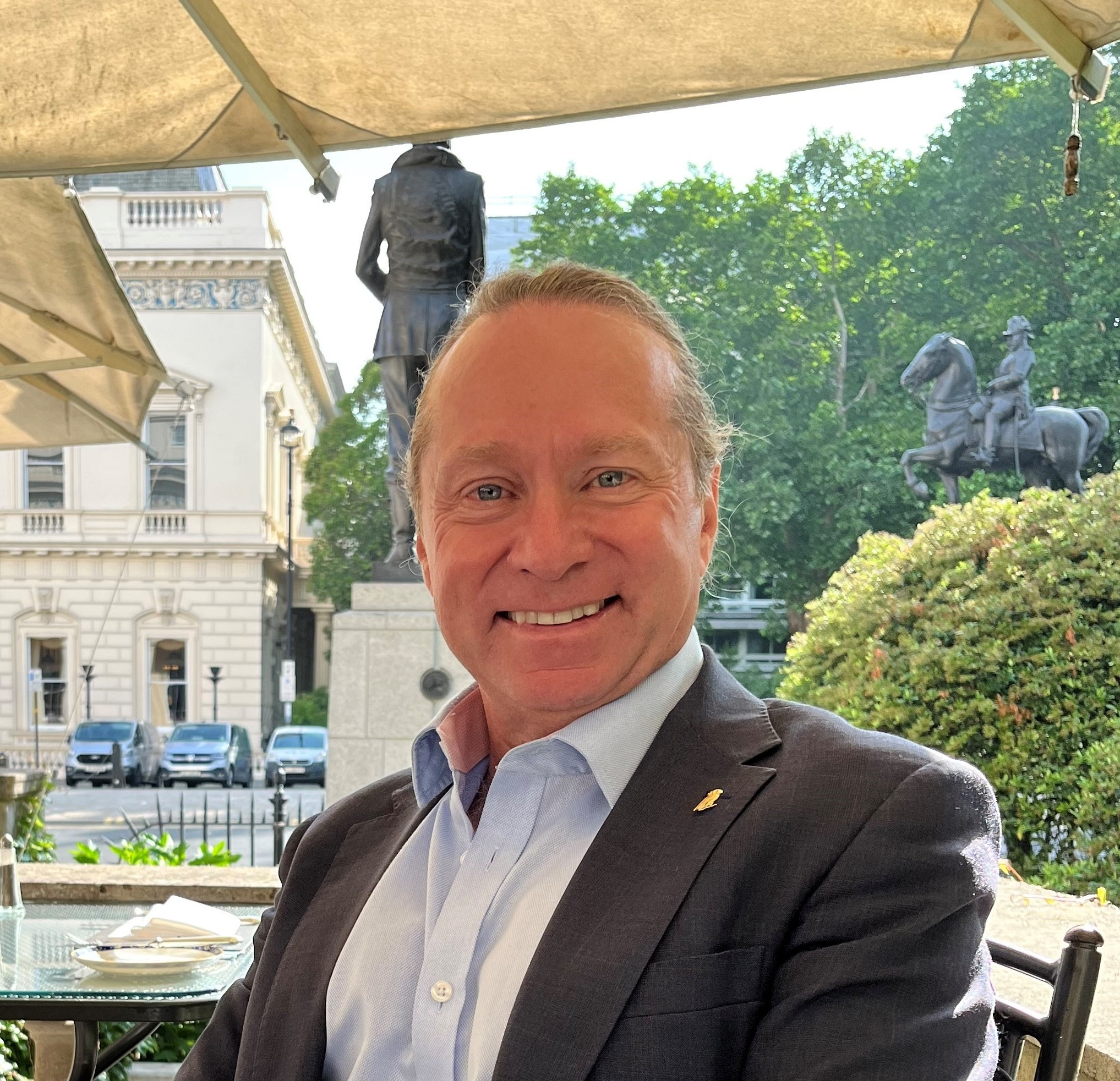
- Jackson in 2025
- Born: 31 July 1962 (age 64); Madrid, Spain
- Education: University of London; University of Oxford; Cornell University
- Known for: Chemical Physics
- Scientific career
- Workplaces: University of Sheffield; Imperial College London
- Doctoral advisor: John S. Rowlinson
- Other academic advisors: Keith E. Gubbins
- Website: Official website

George Jackson (born 31 July 1962) is a British Professor of Chemical Physics in the Department of Chemical Engineering at Imperial College London. He is noted for developing molecular models that describe the thermodynamic properties of complex fluids; as one of the developers of statistical associating fluid theory (SAFT); and for his work in founding the discipline of molecular systems engineering. His theoretical work has found a wide range of practical applications in industries such as specialty chemicals and pharmaceuticals, and emerging fields like sustainable energy, and carbon capture and storage.

== Early life and career ==
Jackson was born in Spain and grew up in Switzerland. He read a B.Sc. in Chemistry at Chelsea College, University of London (1980-1983), followed by a D.Phil. in Physical Chemistry at Exeter College, University of Oxford (1983-1986). After postdoctoral work at Cornell University with Keith E. Gubbins (1986-1989), he became a Lecturer and Reader in Physical Chemistry at the University of Sheffield (1989-1998), and has been Professor of Chemical Physics at Imperial College London since 2001.

== Research interests ==
Jackson's research centres on developing simplified but realistic mathematical models of complex fluids, which are used in industrial applications such as pharmaceuticals, cosmetics, liquid crystals, sustainable energy, and carbon capture. In the late 1980s and early 1990s, he was one of the developers of the influential statistical associating fluid theory (SAFT), an equation of state that predicts the thermodynamic properties of complex fluid mixtures.

== Awards ==
Jackson has won numerous honours and awards including a Research Excellence Award in 2009, the first Guggenheim Medal awarded by the Institution of Chemical Engineers (IChemE) in 2014, the Bakhuis Roozeboom Medal by the Royal Netherlands Academy of Arts and Sciences (KNAW) in 2019, the Rossini Award by the International Association of Chemical Thermodynamics (IACT) in 2023, and the Lennard-Jones Lectureship by the Statistical Mechanics and Thermodynamics Group (SMTG) of the Royal Society of Chemistry (RSC) in 2025. He was elected a Fellow of the Royal Society of Chemistry in 1995, and a Fellow of the Royal Society in 2020.

== Selected publications ==
- Chapman, Walter G.; Jackson, G.; Gubbins, K.E. (11 July 1988). "Phase equilibria of associating fluids: Chain molecules with multiple bonding sites". Molecular Physics. 65: 1057–1079. doi:10.1080/00268978800101601.
- Chapman, Walter G.; Gubbins, K.E.; Jackson, G.; Radosz, M. (1 December 1989). "SAFT: Equation-of-state solution model for associating fluids". Fluid Phase Equilibria. 52: 31–38. Bibcode:1989FlPEq..52...31C. doi:10.1016/0378-3812(89)80308-5. ISSN 0378-3812. S2CID 53310898.
- Chapman, Walter G.; Gubbins, K.E.; Jackson, G.; Radosz, M. (1 August 1990). "New Reference Equation of State for Associating Liquids". Ind. Eng. Chem. Res. 29 (8): 1709–1721. doi:10.1021/ie00104a021.
- Gil-Villegas, Alejandro; Galindo, Amparo; Whitehead, Paul J.; Mills, Stuart J.; Jackson, George; Burgess, Andrew N. (1997). "Statistical associating fluid theory for chain molecules with attractive potentials of variable range". The Journal of Chemical Physics. 106 (10): 4168–4186. Bibcode:1997JChPh.106.4168G. doi:10.1063/1.473101.
- MacDowell, Niall; Florin, Nick; Buchard, Antoine; Hallett, Jason; Galindo, Amparo; et al. (2010). "An overview of CO2 capture technologies". Energy & Environmental Science. 3 (11): 1645–1669. Bibcode:2010EnEnS...3.1645M. doi:10.1039/C004106H.
