= Ravi Radhakrishnan =

American engineer and academic

- Born: India
- Citizenship: American
- Occupations: Engineer and academic
- Known for: Biomedical engineering applications

Academic background
- Education: B.Tech., Chemical Engineering; Ph.D., Chemical Engineering
- Alma mater: Indian Institute of Technology; Cornell University

Academic work
- Institutions: University of Pennsylvania

Ravi Radhakrishnan is an American engineer and an academic. He is the Herman P. Schwan Chair of Bioengineering as well as a professor in the Department of Chemical and Biomolecular Engineering at the University of Pennsylvania.

Radhakrishnan's work is centered around creating digital models for biomedical engineering applications, particularly in cancer treatment and nanomedicine. His work has also focused on computational algorithms across molecular and cellular scales, using machine learning, AI, statistical mechanics, and high-performance scientific computing on parallel architectures. His works have been published in academic journals, including Journal of Physics: Condensed Matter and Nature.

== Education ==
Radhakrishnan completed his B.Tech in Chemical Engineering from the Indian Institute of Technology in 1995. He later obtained his Ph.D. in Chemical Engineering from Cornell University in 2001.

== Career ==
Radhakrishnan began his academic career in 2004 at the University of Pennsylvania. From 2004 to 2010, he held concurrent appointments as an assistant professor of bioengineering and chemical and biomolecular engineering in the School of Engineering and Applied Sciences. From 2006 to 2010, he also served as an assistant professor of biochemistry and biophysics in the School of Medicine. In 2010, he was promoted to associate professor of bioengineering and chemical and biomolecular engineering, holding these appointments until 2012. Between 2013 and 2015, he held appointments as an associate professor of chemical and biomolecular engineering and bioengineering. Since 2015, he has held joint primary appointments as a professor in the Department of Chemical and Biomolecular Engineering and as a professor of bioengineering in the School of Engineering and Applied Sciences at University of Pennsylvania.

As one of the founding members, Radhakrishnan also held an appointment as the director of the Penn Institute for Computational Science from 2019 to 2020. Since 2020, he has chaired the Department of Bioengineering, and since 2024, he has held the title of Herman P. Schwan Chair of Bioengineering.

== Research ==
Radhakrishnan's research interests include nanobiotechnology, molecular systems biology, statistical mechanics, multiscale modeling, insilico oncology and systems pharmacology. Investigating phase separation and phase equilibria in porous materials, his 1999 study highlighted a solid understanding of pure adsorbates in simple geometries, and called for advanced models to address complex geometries, chemical and geometrical heterogeneity, and the largely unexplored phase separation in mixtures. In 2004, he co-authored a paper with T Schlick. The paper used transition path sampling to uncover the atomic and energetic details of the conformational changes in DNA polymerase β that precede nucleotide incorporation, identified key residues and cooperative dynamics crucial for the enzyme's function and fidelity, and provided a protocol applicable to other biomolecular reactions. His 2006 collaborative study with C Alba-Simionesco investigated how confinement within various porous materials influenced the freezing, melting, and structural properties of adsorbates, highlighting new surface-driven and confinement-driven phases, as well as the effects on the glass transition.

Radhakrishnan's 2010 paper investigated ErbB3/HER3 kinase activity, revealing its capacity for autophosphorylation and ATP binding despite structural differences, suggesting its role in signaling pathways and its potential as a therapeutic target in cancer. Later, his 2014 study investigated the prevalence, prognostic significance, and therapeutic implications of ALK mutations in neuroblastoma, highlighting their association with poorer survival and potential for personalized treatment strategies based on mutation profiles. Moreover, in 2018, he analyzed how metastatic melanomas utilized exosomal PD-L1, influenced by IFN-γ, to suppress CD8 T cell function, correlating levels with patient response to anti-PD-1 therapy and suggesting exosomal PD-L1 as a potential biomarker. In 2023, he explored how extracellular matrix stiffness promoted tumor progression by stimulating exosome secretion from cancer cells via an Akt-Rab8 pathway, and demonstrated that exosomes derived under these conditions enhanced tumor growth and activated Notch signaling in recipient cells, indicating a pivotal role for mechanical cues in regulating the tumor microenvironment.

== Awards and honors ==
- 2015 – Fellow, American Institute for Medical and Biological Engineering
- 2021 – Fellow, Royal Society of Medicine
- 2022 – Fellow, Biomedical Engineering Society

== Selected articles ==
- Gelb, L. D., Gubbins, K. E., Radhakrishnan, R., & Sliwinska-Bartkowiak, M. (1999). Phase separation in confined systems. Reports on Progress in Physics, 62(12), 1573.
- Alba-Simionesco, C., Coasne, B., Dosseh, G., Dudziak, G., Gubbins, K. E., Radhakrishnan, R., & Sliwinska-Bartkowiak, M. J. P. C. M. (2006). Effects of confinement on freezing and melting. Journal of Physics: Condensed Matter, 18(6), R15.
- Shi, F., Telesco, S. E., Liu, Y., Radhakrishnan, R., & Lemmon, M. A. (2010). ErbB3/HER3 intracellular domain is competent to bind ATP and catalyze autophosphorylation. Proceedings of the National Academy of Sciences, 107(17), 7692–7697.
- Bresler, S. C., Weiser, D. A., Huwe, P. J., Park, J. H., Krytska, K., Ryles, H., ... & Mossé, Y. P. (2014). ALK mutations confer differential oncogenic activation and sensitivity to ALK inhibition therapy in neuroblastoma. Cancer cell, 26(5), 682–694.
- Chen, G., Huang, A. C., Zhang, W., Zhang, G., Wu, M., Xu, W., ... & Guo, W. (2018). Exosomal PD-L1 contributes to immunosuppression and is associated with anti-PD-1 response. Nature, 560(7718), 382–386.
