= Statistical associating fluid theory =

Chemical theory

Statistical associating fluid theory (SAFT) is a chemical theory, based on perturbation theory, that uses statistical thermodynamics to explain how complex fluids and fluid mixtures form associations through hydrogen bonds. Widely used in industry and academia, it has become a standard approach for describing complex mixtures. Since it was first proposed in 1990, SAFT has been used in a large number of molecular-based equation of state models for describing the Helmholtz energy contribution due to association.

== Overview ==
SAFT is a Helmholtz energy term that can be used in equations of state that describe the thermodynamic and phase equilibrium properties of pure fluids and fluid mixtures. SAFT was developed using statistical mechanics. SAFT models the Helmholtz free energy contribution due to association, i.e. hydrogen bonding. SAFT can be used in combination with other Helmholtz free energy terms. Other Helmholtz energy contributions consider for example Lennard-Jones interactions, covalent chain-forming bonds, and association (interactions between segments caused by, for example, hydrogen bonding). SAFT has been applied to a wide range of fluids, including supercritical fluids, polymers, liquid crystals, electrolytes, surfactant solutions, and refrigerants.

== Development ==
SAFT evolved from thermodynamic theories, including perturbation theories developed in the 1960s, 1970s, and 1980s by John Barker and Douglas Henderson, Keith Gubbins and Chris Gray, and, in particular, Michael Wertheim's first-order, thermodynamic perturbation theory (TPT1) outlined in a series of papers in the 1980s.

The SAFT equation of state was developed using statistical mechanical methods (in particular the perturbation theory of Wertheim) to describe the interactions between molecules in a system. The idea of a SAFT equation of state was first proposed by Walter G. Chapman and by Chapman et al. in 1988 and 1989. Many different versions of the SAFT models have been proposed, but all use the same chain and association terms derived by Chapman et al. One of the first SAFT papers (1990) titled "New reference equation of state for associating liquids" by Walter G. Chapman, Keith Gubbins, George Jackson, and Maciej Radosz, was recognized in 2007 by Industrial and Engineering Chemistry Research as one of the most highly cited papers of the previous three decades. SAFT is one of the first theories to accurately describe (in comparison with molecular simulation) the effects on fluid properties of molecular size and shape in addition to association between molecules.

== Variations ==
Many variations of SAFT have been developed since the 1990s, including HR-SAFT (Huang-Radosz SAFT), PC-SAFT (perturbed chain SAFT), Polar SAFT, PCP-SAFT (PC-polar-SAFT), soft-SAFT, polar soft-SAFT, SAFT-VR (variable range), SAFT-VR Mie. The Multipolar SAFT-VR Mie equation of state was later developed to model polar and polarizable fluids. Further extension led to the SAFT-VR Mie DBD (doubly bonded dimer) model, specifically designed for carboxylic acid systems. Also, the SAFT term was used in combination with cubic equations of state for describing the dispersive-repulsive interactions, for example in the Cubic-Plus-Association (CPA) equation of state model and the SAFT + cubic model and non-random-lattice (NLF) models based on lattice field theory.

== Association schemes ==
The association term in SAFT (i.e. hydrogen bonding) is handled by assigning to each molecule a set of "association sites" that are permitted to form bonds with association sites on other molecules. The strength of a bond between two sites is characterized by a bonding energy. In order to characterise different kinds of molecules and functional groups, a molecule or group is assigned one of many "association schemes", which are summarised in the (non-exhaustive) table below. These schemes are used to differentiate between the number of association sites a molecule has, and which other sites each site is permitted to bond to. In this system, each association scheme consists of a number and a letter. The number indicates how many association sites the molecule (or group) has, while the letters are used to differentiate between different schemes based on the permitted bonds. In the "A" schemes, all association sites can form bonds with all other sites, while in the "B" and "C" schemes, only certain sites are permitted to bond to certain other sites.

While the appropriate association scheme for a given molecule or group can in principle be deduced from the electronic structure, it is common to treat the association scheme heuristically, and to determine the best scheme by fitting to experimental data.

Scheme	No. of sites	Permitted bonds	Example
1A	1	A-A	Acid, tertiary amine
2A	2	A-A, A-B, B-B	
2B	2	A-B	Secondary amine
2C	2	A-A, A-B	
3A	3	A-A, A-B, A-C, B-B, B-C, C-C	
3B	3	A-C, B-C	Primary amine
4A	4	A-A, A-B, A-C, A-D, B-B, B-C, B-D, C-C, C-D, D-D	
4B	4	A-D, B-D, C-D	Ammonia
4C	4	A-C, A-D, B-C, B-D	Water
DBD	2	A-B	Carboxylic acids
