= Maidstone Grammar School for Girls =

Location
- Buckland Road; Maidstone, Kent, ME16 0SF; England; 51°16′48″N 0°30′43″E

Information
- Type: Foundation grammar school
- Motto: non sibi sed omnibus
- Established: 1888
- Local authority: Kent
- Department for Education URN: 118836 Tables
- Ofsted: Reports
- Chairman of Governors: Lindsay Horne
- Headteacher: Deborah Stanley
- Staff: 133
- Gender: Girls (mixed sixth-form)
- Age: 11 to 18
- Enrolment: 1,220
- Houses: Britons; Danes; Normans; Romans; Saxons; Vikings
- Colours: Maidstone Blue; Dove Blue
- Former Pupils: Old Girls
- Website: http://www.mggs.org/

Maidstone Grammar School for Girls, also known as Maidstone Girls Grammar School (MGGS), is a selective grammar school in Maidstone, UK. It operates under the 11-plus exam system, in which students take the 11-plus exam (also known as the Kent Test) in September of Year 6, in order to be accepted at this school. The school is primarily a single-sex girls' school, however it also incorporates a sixth form college which is mixed.

== History ==
Maidstone Grammar School for Girls was founded in 1887 by the Wardens and Assistants of Rochester Bridge, at a cost of £4,500. It was originally located at Albion Place when it opened in January 1888 with 18 pupils. The current building was opened in Great Buckland in 1938. The new site was previously the home to Great Buckland, a 17th-century mansion once owned by the Earl of Aylesford, which was knocked down to make room for the new building; at the point of demolition, the mansion was unsafe and was in a state of disrepair.

Construction of new building, 1938

Additional buildings have since been added, including a large extension to the old building, and several separate blocks of classrooms and a large sports hall. The school used to have an onsite swimming pool for students to use, but this was later filled to make room for a car park.

The school became a voluntary controlled grammar school since 1944, and it returned to the 11-plus entry examination in 1993.

=== Previous Head Teachers ===
Name	Period
Miss M.E. Pope	1888 - 1892
Miss M.E. Hailey	1892 - 1912
Miss W.M Kidd	1912 - 1930
Miss R. Bartels	1930 - 1951
Miss E. Barnes	1951 - 1970
Miss T.M. Harvey	1971 - 1990
Mrs K.J. Judson	1990 - 2002
Dr. M. Kiely	2002 - 2005
Mr J. Harrison	2005 - 2006
Mrs M. Smith	2006 - 2014
Ms M. Wolloshin	2014 - 2015
Miss D. Stanley	2015 - Current

=== Air Raid Shelters ===
During the second world war, the school was believed to be at high risk due to its location at the intersection of two train lines, the Medway Valley line and the Maidstone line. As a result, three separate air raid shelters were constructed on the school site; two at the front and one at the rear of the main building. The largest of the three shelters is located at the southern side of the site, under what is a building that is now known as 'T Block'. This shelter differs in design from the others, being a large open room; though a corner is filled with concrete for the foundations of the building above. The two other shelters that are on the northern and western sides of the site are made of a series of corridors, equipped with benches and black-boards. The shelters were constructed at the time to keep students from the main building so teaching could continue, but it is believed the structures would not survive a direct hit.

Since 2018 the school has been opening the northern shelter to local schools, with future plans to open the additional shelters on the site.

== Buildings ==
The site is made up of 5 separate buildings. The largest of these is ‘A block’, referred often as the ‘main building’. This is the original building which houses the main hall, history, modern foreign languages, religious studies, chemistry, physics, the two drama studios, the Mary Smith library and the gym. The building also houses classrooms used for philosophy for sixth form students. A block is a symmetrical building, consisting of two quadrangles surrounded by corridors, similar to cloisters, which originally had no windows and were open roofed; both have since been installed. The main hall is the home of the largest stage in the school, with an additional gallery at the back.

In the late 1970s, a large extension was added to the eastern side of ‘A Block’; this extension is known as ‘C block’. This section of the school is the home of maths, geography, design technology, food tech, and textiles. It also has a large room on the upper floor which was formerly the sixth form common room, but is now known as the small hall.

In 2010 the school was given approval for a new building. Construction commenced in January 2011 and was planned to be completed by Christmas, however due to delays, it was officially opened in April 2012 for students. The new building, called Buckland house, houses the sixth-form common area, Psychology, Sociology, Media Studies, Business and Economics for sixth students, as well as Art and English departments, releasing space in the main buildings for further expansion. A small, mobile building (known as N Block) was thought to be knocked down as due to the addition of the new building, but will now be refurbished.

On the north side of the school, there is a building that houses too music rooms, used for both music classes and rehearsal for the school’s chamber choir. There are also additional, smaller rehearsal rooms that students can book out for music exam practice or rehearsals for performances such as house arts, music showcases, or performing arts showcases.

There is a sports hall called the Molly Tipples Sports Hall, named after the late Chairman of Governors, which held its formal opening on April 11th 2016. In 2015, further planning permission was granted to build the replacement sports hall. The hall contains a large multi-use games area, equipped with retractable basketball hoops and a sound system. On the upper floor of the building there are two dance studios, which have now been temporarily fitted to be used as changing rooms. A request for planning permission to extend the sports hall was placed in May 2019. The planning permission was granted in October 2019. The extension would add additional changing facilities, as well as showers and one additional classroom.

In January 2026, a new building was completed and opened to staff and students called the Helen Keen building. This 3 storey building will include history, music and biology departments, as well as a being the hub for a future visitor centre. This visit centre will be for the public to visit and tour the previously mentioned air raid centres located on school grounds. The Helen Keen building was constructed mainly to replace the falling apart T block, which is structurally unstable in some parts due to being installed in the 1950s and being a "temporary" block, that currently hosts lab rooms primarily for biology classes. The name of the building is attributed to Helen Keen, an art teacher who documented the school through World War Two through art. The building will also house a visitor centre for the school’s WW2 shelters, offices and a PE storage.

== Houses ==
The school operates a house system consisting of six different houses; Vikings, Normans, Danes, Britons, Saxons and Romans. These houses compete in multiple annual competitions which encourage teamwork and team spirit and are a vibrant part of MGGS life. Perhaps the most popular competition is the House Arts Cup which takes place at the end of October. The event celebrates the arts of song, dance and acting and alternates between these each year. As well as House Arts the other competitions are Sports Day, Inter-house Rounders/Netball/Football, The Science Quiz, and Inter-house Art. The houses are led by three year 13 students, who are elected into their role of House Leaders by their house.

From 2006, the House Captain election process, which had previously been decided entirely by votes from members of the house (both staff and students) was decided by interview as well as votes. Although in recent years the interview process is strictly kept for the Head Student election process. Instead, the House Leader election process consists of applications sent to the Senior Leadership Team, and those who are successful with their applications move to the election, where House Leader candidates give a speech to the respective Houses who then vote. Elections take place at the end of the second term before year thirteen students go on study leave. Every so often, house captains organise assemblies on set topics, which feature different house events that students can take part in.

== Incidents ==
=== June - July 2026 Heatwave Incident ===
Following the rising temperatures in the UK, parts of the school became unsafe to use due to the extreme heat. Students migrated to the World War Two bunkers underneath the school for their lessons, as the temperatures there were significantly cooler. This received national attention, with outlets such as the BBC and LBC reporting on the school's use of the bunkers throughout the heatwave.

=== May 2019 Prom Incident ===
On 11 May 2019, it was reported that following several pranks performed by students at the end of the year, the year 11 prom would be canceled. According to the school there were several unsafe pranks that included lubricating stairways and putting itching powder on the toilets. It is reported that the itching powder sent several students to hospital due to allergic reactions. Several parents took to organising their own prom, which went ahead on the same day to replace the canceled event. The annual year 11 has since been permanently cancelled with the school only permitting year 13 students to have a prom after completely their A-Level exams.

=== October 2017 Admissions Incident ===
Following a complaint, a local government inspector found that the school was failing to follow its admissions policy and was therefore in 'breach of statutory guidance'. It was found the school was applying different entry requirements into the sixth-form for internal and external applicants. The school vowed to change its policy to give all applicants fair and equal requirements.

== Notable alumni (Old Girls) ==
- Dame Karen Dunnell, National Statistician & Registrar-General, Office for National Statistics
- Carole Goble, professor of computer science at the University of Manchester
- Alison Noble, professor of engineering at the University of Oxford
- Lizzy Yarnold, skeleton racer who won two Winter Olympic gold medals (2014 in Sochi, 2018 in PyeongChang)
- Rosie Galligan, England and Saracens rugby union player, England women's national rugby union team
- Mia Mckenna-Bruce, actress and dancer in The Dumping Ground
