= Lewisham North =

UK Parliament constituency (1950–1974, 2024 onwards)

- Borough constituency for the House of Commons
- Interactive map of boundaries from 2024
- Location within Greater London
- County: Greater London
- Electorate: 73,504 (March 2020)
- Major settlements: Lewisham, New Cross, Deptford (part)

Current constituency
- Created: 2024
- Member of Parliament: Vicky Foxcroft (Labour)
- Seats: One
- Created from: Lewisham Deptford

1950–February 1974
- Created from: Lewisham East
- Replaced by: Lewisham Deptford and Lewisham East

Lewisham North is a parliamentary constituency in Lewisham, London which returns one Member of Parliament (MP) to the House of Commons of the Parliament of the United Kingdom. It was re-established at the 2024 general election by the 2023 periodic review of Westminster constituencies, primarily formed from the abolished seat of Lewisham Deptford. The seat is currently represented by Vicky Foxcroft of Labour, who had been MP for Lewisham Deptford since 2015.

A previous creation of the seat existed from 1950 until it was abolished for the February 1974 general election.

== Constituency profile ==
Lewisham North is an urban constituency in the Borough of Lewisham in Greater London, located around 5 miles (8.0 km) south-east of the centre of London. It includes the town centre of Lewisham and the neighbourhoods of Ladywell, Brockley, New Cross and parts of Deptford and Blackheath. The area was mostly developed for housing during the early 20th century. Deptford is located on the south bank of the River Thames and has a history of shipbuilding as the former site of a Royal Navy dockyard. The constituency has a large student population as the location of Goldsmiths, University of London, which has around 8,000 students. Lewisham North has average levels of wealth; there is some deprivation in Deptford whilst Blackheath is more affluent. House prices are lower than the rest of London.

In general, residents of Lewisham North are very young and well-educated. They are unlikely to be married and likely to live in rented housing. Levels of income and professional employment are similar to London averages and a high proportion of residents work in the health and education sectors. The percentage of the population claiming unemployment benefits is higher than the London-wide and nationwide figures. Half the population were White at the 2021 census, around one-third of whom were of non-British origin. Black people were the largest ethnic minority group at 27%, including large Jamaican and Nigerian communities, and Asians were 10%, including a large Chinese population. At the local borough council, all seats in the constituency are represented by Labour Party councillors. Voters in Lewisham North overwhelmingly voted in favour of remaining in the European Union in the 2016 referendum; an estimated 78% voted to remain compared to the nationwide figure of 48%. Electoral Calculus ranks the constituency as the 11th most remain-voting constituency out of 650 in the United Kingdom.

== Boundaries ==
=== 1950–1974 ===
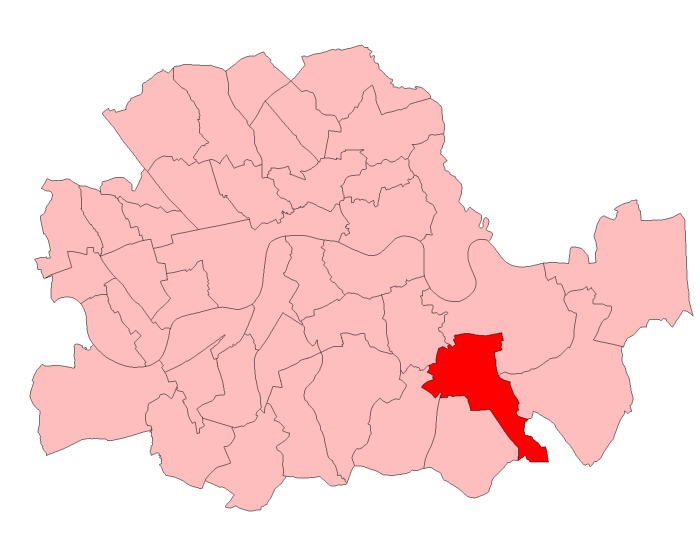
Lewisham North in the Parliamentary County of London from 1950 to 1974.

The Metropolitan Borough of Lewisham wards of Blackheath and Church Lee, Ladywell, Lewisham Park, Lewisham Village, Manor Lee, and South Lee.

=== Current ===
The re-established constituency succeeds Lewisham Deptford, except Crofton Park ward, which is in the new constituency of Lewisham West and East Dulwich. Blackheath ward was added from Lewisham East. Following the 2023 review of Westminster constituencies, which came into effect for the 2024 general election, the constituency is composed of the following electoral wards of the London Borough of Lewisham:

- Blackheath, Brockley, Deptford, Evelyn, Ladywell, Lewisham Central, New Cross Gate, and Telegraph Hill.

== Members of Parliament ==
Election	Member	Party	Notes
1950	Austin Hudson	Conservative	Died November 1956
1957 by-election	Niall MacDermot	Labour	
1959	Christopher Chataway	Conservative	
1966	Roland Moyle	Labour	
Feb 1974	constituency abolished		
2024	constituency recreated		
2024	Vicky Foxcroft	Labour	MP for Lewisham Deptford (2015–2024)

== Election results ==
=== Elections in the 2020s ===
General election 2024: Lewisham North
Party	Candidate	Votes	%	±%
Labour	Vicky Foxcroft	25,467	57.7	−11.7
Green	Adam Pugh	9,685	21.9	+16.6
Liberal Democrats	Jean Branch	3,284	7.4	−3.7
Conservative	Nupur Majumdar	2,701	6.1	−6.1
Reform	Edward Powell	2,000	4.5	+2.9
Workers Party	Mian Akbar	457	1.0	N/A
Independent	Julia Tilford	243	0.6	N/A
Communist	Oliver Snelling	211	0.5	N/A
Alliance for Green Socialism	John Lloyd	119	0.3	+0.2
Majority		15,782	35.8	–21.4
Turnout		44,167	59.5	–9.3
Registered electors		74,204		
Labour hold		Swing	▼14.2	

=== Elections in the 2010s ===
2019 notional result
Party	Vote	%
Labour	35,124	69.4
Conservative	6,175	12.2
Liberal Democrats	5,620	11.1
Green	2,656	5.3
Brexit Party	810	1.6
Others	201	0.4
Turnout	50,586	68.8
Electorate	73,504	

=== Elections in the 1970s ===
General election 1970: Lewisham North
Party	Candidate	Votes	%	±%
Labour	Roland Moyle	18,235	51.45	
Conservative	Hugh Samuel	17,208	48.55	
Majority		1,027	2.90	
Turnout		35,443	68.49	
Labour hold		Swing		

=== Elections in the 1960s ===
General election 1966: Lewisham North
Party	Candidate	Votes	%	±%
Labour	Roland Moyle	20,352	53.08	
Conservative	Christopher Chataway	17,989	46.92	
Majority		2,363	6.16	N/A
Turnout		38,341	77.41	
Labour gain from Conservative		Swing		

General election 1964: Lewisham North
Party	Candidate	Votes	%	±%
Conservative	Christopher Chataway	17,144	45.42	
Labour	Henry Collins	16,801	44.51	
Liberal	Trevor Lloyd-Jones	3,798	10.06	
Majority		343	0.91	
Turnout		37,703	74.56	
Conservative hold		Swing		

=== Elections in the 1950s ===
General election 1959: Lewisham North
Party	Candidate	Votes	%	±%
Conservative	Christopher Chataway	22,125	51.99	−1.97
Labour	Niall MacDermot	17,512	41.15	−4.89
Liberal	Kenneth John Brookes	2,921	6.86	New
Majority		4,613	10.84	N/A
Turnout		42,558	81.19	
Conservative gain from Labour		Swing		

United Kingdom Parliament: Lewisham North by-election 1957
Party	Candidate	Votes	%	±%
Labour	Niall MacDermot	18,516	49.50	+3.46
Conservative	Norman Farmer	17,406	46.53	−7.43
Independent loyalist	Leslie Greene	1,487	3.97	New
Majority		1,110	2.97	N/A
Turnout		37,409		
Labour gain from Conservative		Swing	+5.44	

General election 1955: Lewisham North
Party	Candidate	Votes	%	±%
Conservative	Austin Hudson	22,070	53.96	+0.50
Labour	Trevor Williams	18,834	46.04	−0.50
Majority		3,236	7.91	+0.99
Turnout		40,904	77.93	−6.09
Conservative hold		Swing		

General election 1951: Lewisham North
Party	Candidate	Votes	%	±%
Conservative	Austin Hudson	24,406	53.46	
Labour	Trevor Williams	21,243	46.54	
Majority		3,163	6.92	
Turnout		45,649	84.02	
Conservative hold		Swing		

General election 1950: Lewisham North
Party	Candidate	Votes	%	±%
Conservative	Austin Hudson	22,465	49.56	
Labour	Fred Copeman	19,974	44.07	
Liberal	Stanley George Smith	2,888	6.37	
Majority		2,491	5.49	
Turnout		45,327	84.51	
Conservative win (new seat)				
