= Fulham (London County Council constituency) =

London County Council constituency

- Former constituency for the London County Council

Former constituency
- Created: 1889; 1955
- Abolished: 1919; 1965
- Member(s): 2 (1889 to 1919); 3 (1955 to 1965)

Fulham was a constituency used for elections to the London County Council between 1889 and 1919, and again between 1955 and the council's abolition, in 1965. The seat shared boundaries with the UK Parliament constituency of the same name. The seat largely replaced Fulham East and Fulham West.

== Councillors ==
Year	Name	Party	Name	Party
1889	James Beal	Progressive	Robert Arthur Germaine	Moderate
1892	Edwin Cornwall	Progressive	Arthur Downes	Progressive
1895	Edwin Cornwall	Progressive	William Lawrence Young	Progressive
1898	Edward George Easton	Moderate	Frederick Glyn	Moderate
1901	Timothy Davies	Progressive	Peter Lawson	Progressive
1905	Timothy Davies	Progressive	Cyril Cobb	Municipal Reform
1907	Edward George Easton	Municipal Reform	Cyril Cobb	Municipal Reform
1916	Henry George Harris	Municipal Reform	Cyril Cobb	Municipal Reform

Year	Name	Party	Name	Party	Name	Party
1955	Ethel Rankin	Labour	Richard Edmonds	Labour	Hilda Selwyn-Clarke	Labour
1957	Walter Rankin	Labour	Richard Edmonds	Labour	Hilda Selwyn-Clarke	Labour

== Election results ==
=== 1889 to 1919 ===
1889 London County Council election: Fulham
Party	Candidate	Votes	%	±%
Progressive	James Beal	2,309		
Moderate	Robert Arthur Germaine	1,950		
Independent	Leveson Scarth	1,509		
Independent	Philip Pethick Perry	1,203		
Independent	Edward George Easton	366		
Progressive win (new seat)				
Moderate win (new seat)				

1892 London County Council election: Fulham
Party	Candidate	Votes	%	±%
Progressive	Edwin Cornwall	3,653		
Progressive	Arthur Downes	3,459		
Moderate	Robert Arthur Germaine	2,436		
Moderate	Montagu Clementi	2,412		
Progressive gain from Moderate		Swing		
Progressive hold		Swing		

1895 London County Council election: Fulham
Party	Candidate	Votes	%	±%
Progressive	Edwin Cornwall	3,510		
Progressive	William Lawrence Young	3,458		
Moderate	Oliver Russell	3,275		
Moderate	E. Jenkins	3,251		
Progressive hold		Swing		
Progressive hold		Swing		

1898 London County Council election: Fulham
Party	Candidate	Votes	%	±%
Moderate	Frederick Glyn	4,494		
Moderate	Edward George Easton	4,407		
Progressive	T. Sadler	4,048		
Progressive	Beaumont Morice	4,043		
Moderate gain from Progressive		Swing		
Moderate gain from Progressive		Swing		

1901 London County Council election: Fulham
Party	Candidate	Votes	%	±%
Progressive	Timothy Davies	5,341	29.3	+5.5
Progressive	Peter Lawson	5,259	28.9	+5.1
Conservative	Edward George Easton	3,497	19.2	−6.7
Conservative	Cameron Gull	3,483	19.1	−7.3
Independent	James Edwin Cooney	645	3.5	n/a
Progressive gain from Conservative		Swing		
Progressive gain from Conservative		Swing	+6.2	

1904 London County Council election: Fulham
Party	Candidate	Votes	%	±%
Progressive	Timothy Davies	6,207		
Progressive	Peter Lawson	6,179		
Municipal Reform	Lytton	5,357		
Municipal Reform	Skinner	5,247		
Majority				
Progressive hold		Swing		
Progressive hold		Swing		

1905 Fulham by-election
Party	Candidate	Votes	%	±%
Municipal Reform	Cyril Cobb	4,395		
Progressive	Harold Spender	3,970		
Labour	Clark	1,177		
Majority		425		
Municipal Reform gain from Progressive		Swing		

1907 London County Council election: Fulham
Party	Candidate	Votes	%	±%
Municipal Reform	Cyril Cobb	8,413		
Municipal Reform	Edward George Easton	8,301		
Progressive	W. Lloyd Taylor	4,774		
Labour	J. Stephenson	3,139		
Social Democratic Federation	T. R. Wall	773		
Majority				
Municipal Reform gain from Progressive		Swing		
Municipal Reform gain from Progressive		Swing		

1910 London County Council election: Fulham
Party	Candidate	Votes	%	±%
Municipal Reform	Cyril Cobb	7,398	30.1	
Municipal Reform	Edward George Easton	7,314	29.8	
Progressive	W R Sayer	4,989	20.3	
Progressive	George Arthur Gale	4,856	19.8	
Majority				
Municipal Reform hold		Swing		

1913 London County Council election: Fulham
Party	Candidate	Votes	%	±%
Municipal Reform	Cyril Stephen Cobb	7,649	30.6	+0.5
Municipal Reform	Edward George Easton	7,614	30.5	+0.7
Progressive	David Sydney Waterlow	4,870	19.5	−0.8
Progressive	Walter Meakin	4,843	19.4	−0.4
Majority		2,744	11.0	+1.5
Municipal Reform hold		Swing	+0.7	
Municipal Reform hold		Swing	+0.5	

=== 1955 to 1964 ===
1955 London County Council election: Fulham
Party	Candidate	Votes	%	±%
Labour	Ethel Rankin	13,212		
Labour	Richard Edmonds	12,813		
Labour	Hilda Selwyn-Clarke	12,756		
Conservative	J. Haggie	10,421		
Conservative	T. B. Langton	10,350		
Conservative	P. J. Robson	10,055		
Labour win (new seat)				
Labour win (new seat)				
Labour win (new seat)				

1958 London County Council election: Fulham
Party	Candidate	Votes	%	±%
Labour	Walter Rankin	13,305		
Labour	Richard Edmonds	12,708		
Labour	Hilda Selwyn-Clarke	12,305		
Conservative	C. Patterson	6,555		
Conservative	John Udal	6,306		
Conservative	R. W. W. Rhodes	6,299		
Labour hold		Swing		
Labour hold		Swing		
Labour hold		Swing		

1961 London County Council election: Fulham
Party	Candidate	Votes	%	±%
Labour	Walter Rankin	12,759		
Labour	Richard Edmonds	12,705		
Labour	Hilda Selwyn-Clarke	12,222		
Conservative	M. De La Motte	10,460		
Conservative	J. Mills	10,243		
Conservative	W. J. Parsons	9,972		
Labour hold		Swing		
Labour hold		Swing		
Labour hold		Swing		
