= J. Howard Whitehouse =

British politician (1873–1955)

John Whitehouse

John Howard Whitehouse (1873–1955) was a British politician, the founder and first Warden of Bembridge School on the Isle of Wight, and the Member of Parliament (MP) for Mid Lanarkshire from 1910 to 1918. His father, George Whitehouse, was a Quaker and an uncompromising Gladstonian Liberal whose strong views on issues such as Irish Home Rule and opposition to the politics of Liberal Unionist, later Conservative, leader Joseph Chamberlain were to shape his son's political views. Whitehouse, throughout his career in politics and later at Bembridge, was an intense believer in the right of the individual to shape his own life and a bitter opponent of any form of bureaucratic control.

== Biography ==
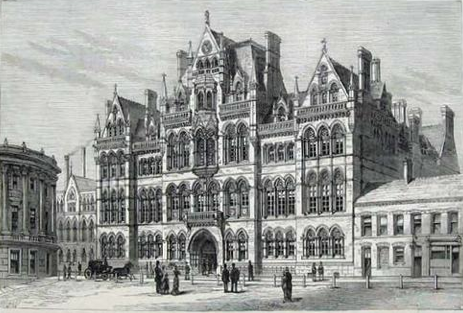
Mason Science College, now the University of Birmingham

Whitehouse attended the Midland Institute and Mason Science College (which became the University of Birmingham), specialising at the former in literature, history and political economy. It was here that he first read the works of John Ruskin, of whom he became a lifelong disciple.

In 1894, Whitehouse joined the firm of Cadbury as a clerk. Living in Bournville, the model village, in 1899 he founded and managed a large youth club. In 1901 he began a campaign to establish a national memorial to Ruskin in the village. Ruskin Hall, now the Bournville Centre for Visual Arts, comprised a library, museum and lecture hall. In the early twentieth century he acted as treasurer to Birmingham Technical Education Committee.

Whitehouse founded the Ruskin Society of Birmingham in 1896, organising lectures by notable speakers, focused on the social questions of the day. Every year he organised excursions to places of Ruskinian interest, including some of England's great cathedrals. He founded and edited the society's influential quarterly journal, Saint George (1898–1911), managing its business affairs and eventually becoming its publisher.

In November 1903 he was appointed secretary to the Carnegie Dunfermline Trust, resigning because of irreconcilable differences with the trustees in 1905, when he joined the university settlement, Toynbee Hall in Whitechapel, east London, as secretary. He took a keen interest in its education and youth work, and had lectured widely on such matters since the late 1890s.

He worked briefly with Baden Powell and edited The Scout, became Sub-Warden of St George's School in Harpenden and was warden of the Manchester University Settlement at Ancoats.

In 1910 Whitehouse entered Parliament as a Liberal representing the constituency of Mid Lanarkshire.

General election Jan 1910: Mid Lanarkshire
Party	Candidate	Votes	%	±%
Liberal	John Howard Whitehouse	5,792	38.5	
Conservative	John Johnson Pickering	5,401	35.9	
Labour	Robert Smillie	3,864	25.7	

General election Dec 1910: Mid Lanarkshire
Party	Candidate	Votes	%	±%
Liberal	John Howard Whitehouse	6,033	38.7	+0.2
Conservative	Henry Shanks Keith	5,702	36.6	+0.7
Labour	Robert Smillie	3,847	24.7	−1.0

He served as Parliamentary Private Secretary to the Chancellor of the Exchequer, Lloyd George, and pursued his interest in education, serving on a number of committees dealing with child labour, child wages and reformatory work.

Shortly before the Great War broke out Whitehouse was introduced to Edward Daws, who showed him the Isle of Wight. He was so taken with the place that he bought a field and a house known as The Old School House. This was to form the nucleus of Bembridge School a few years later.

At the beginning of 1916 he organised opposition to the Government's Military Service Bill that successfully introduced conscription. In 1916 he lent his support to the growing conscientious objector movement, reflecting his Quaker background.

As a result of a minor revision of constituencies, Mid Lanarkshire ceased to exist, and Whitehouse unsuccessfully fought for the Hamilton seat in the 1918 election. Despite his past close working relationship with Lloyd George and because of his opposition to the Coalition Government during the war, Lloyd George publicly supported his Unionist opponent at the election.

General election 1918: Hamilton
Party	Candidate	Votes	%	±%
Labour	Duncan Macgregor Graham	6,988	42.1	
Coalition Conservative	Henry Shanks Keith	4,819	29.0	
National Democratic	David Gilmour	4,297	25.9	
Liberal	John Howard Whitehouse	504	3.0	

This defeat germinated the idea that had long been in his thoughts, the foundation of a boarding school based on different principles to those underlying orthodox public schools of the day. In 1919 he founded Bembridge School on the Isle of Wight, overlooking Whitecliff Bay.

Whilst his life from 1919 was closely bound up with the school he continued to pursue outside interests, penning a number of pamphlets and books on the subject of education and contesting every election between 1922 and 1935 (with, as he once noted wryly "equal measure of success").

He again stood as a parliamentary candidate for the Liberal Party at six general elections; Hanley in 1922, Hereford in 1923 and 1924; Southampton in 1929, Thornbury in 1931 and finally Stoke Newington in 1935.

General election of 6 December 1923; electorate 28,538
Party	Candidate	Votes	%	±%
Conservative	Sir Samuel Roberts	11,448	55.3	−20.9
Liberal	John Howard Whitehouse	8,280	40.0	+40.0
Labour	Sydney Box	981	4.7	−19.1
Majority		3,168		
Turnout				

General election of 29 October 1924; electorate 29,083
Party	Candidate	Votes	%	±%
Conservative	Sir Samuel Roberts	13,210	60.6	+5.3
Liberal	John Howard Whitehouse	8,604	39.4	−0.6
Majority		4,606		
Turnout				

General election of 14 November 1935; electorate 34,591
Party	Candidate	Votes	%	±%
Conservative	Sir George William Henry Jones	11,213	53.3	
Labour	David Weitzman	7,448	35.4	
Liberal	John Howard Whitehouse	2,364	11.2	
Majority				
Turnout				
Conservative hold		Swing		

He organised the committee to ensure the preservation of the Fram, the ship which carried Norwegian polar explorer Fridtjof Nansen to the Arctic and later Roald Amundsen to the Antarctic. He also bought Brantwood, Ruskin's home in the Lake District.

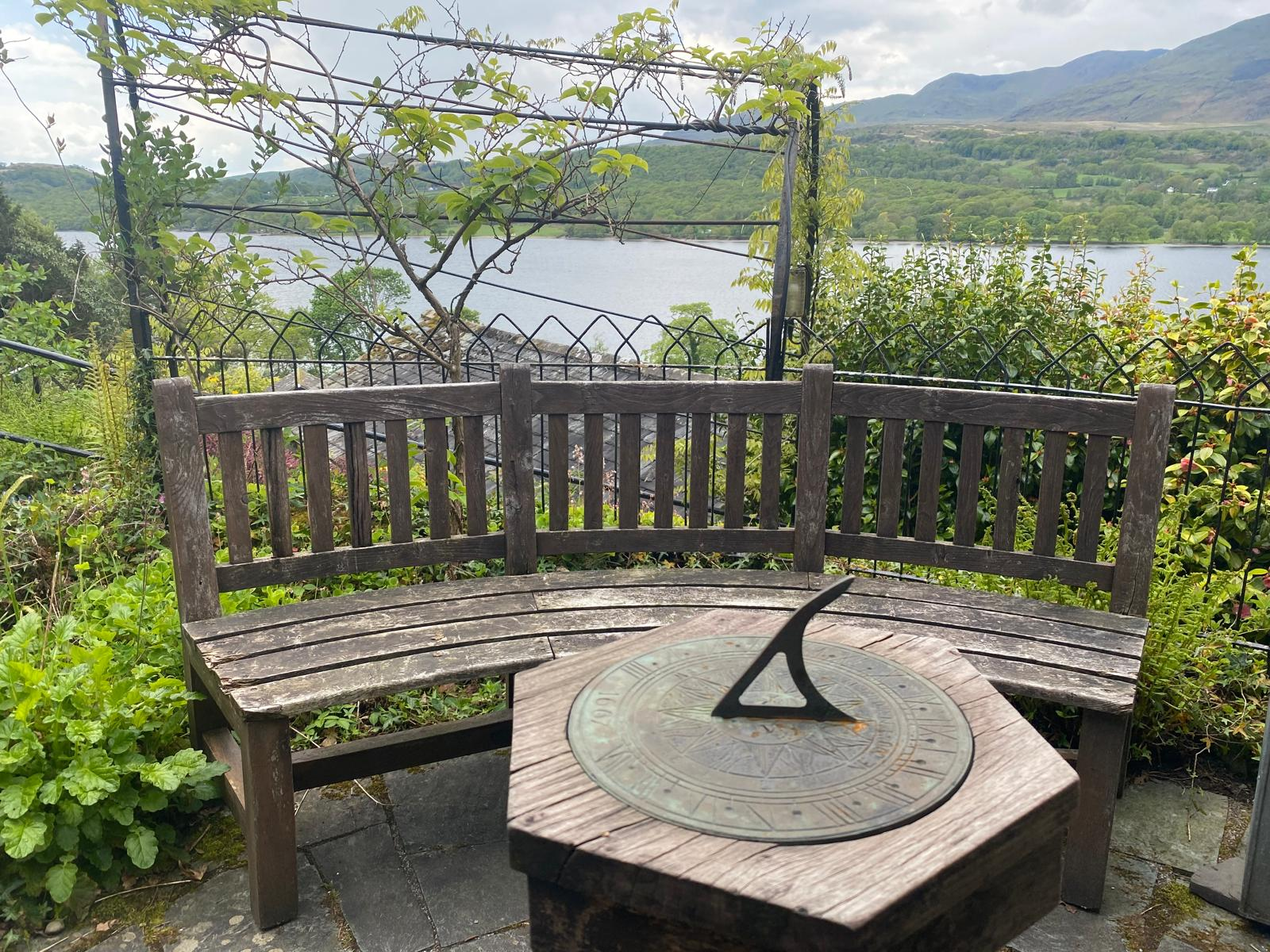
The sundial at Brantwood House. The resting place of John Howard Whitehouse

In 1953, during an Old Boys cricket match, he was struck in the eye by a cricket ball, and was severely injured. The effects incapacitated him, and he died in his sleep on 28 September 1955. When Bembridge School was closed in the early 1990s, his ashes were moved from the school chapel to Brantwood, and are located beneath the sundial, outside the Severn Gallery.

Parliament of the United Kingdom
Preceded by James Caldwell	Member of Parliament for Mid Lanarkshire; Jan. 1910–1918	Constituency abolished
