= Fulham West (London County Council constituency) =

London County Council constituency

- Former constituency for the London County Council

Former constituency
- Created: 1919
- Abolished: 1955
- Member(s): 2 (to 1949); 3 (from 1949)
- Created from: Fulham
- Replaced by: Fulham

Fulham West was a constituency used for elections to the London County Council between 1919 and 1955. The seat shared boundaries with the UK Parliament constituency of the same name. It was largely replaced by a new Fulham constituency.

== Councillors ==
Year	Name	Party	Name	Party	Name	Party
1919	Cyril Cobb	Municipal Reform	William Warner	Municipal Reform	Two seats until 1949	
1922	Cyril Cobb	Municipal Reform	Frank Hobbs	Municipal Reform	Two seats until 1949	
1931	Cyril Cobb	Municipal Reform	George Gordon	Municipal Reform	Two seats until 1949	
1934	Christopher Lancaster	Labour	Leah L'Estrange Malone	Labour	Two seats until 1949	
1937	Christopher Lancaster	Labour	Geoffrey Weston Aplin	Municipal Reform	Two seats until 1949	
1946	Christopher Lancaster	Labour	Frank Banfield	Labour	Two seats until 1949	
1949	Ian Mactaggart	Conservative	Frank Banfield	Labour	Ethel Rankin	Labour
1952	Richard Edmonds	Labour	Frank Banfield	Labour	Ethel Rankin	Labour

== Election results ==
1919 London County Council election: Fulham West
Party	Candidate	Votes	%	±%
Municipal Reform	Cyril Cobb	3,834	34.8	
Municipal Reform	William Warner	3,542	32.2	
Labour	Robert Mark Gentry	1,934	17.6	
Labour	John Palmer	1,695	15.4	
Majority		1,608	14.6	
Municipal Reform hold		Swing		
Municipal Reform hold		Swing		

1922 London County Council election: Fulham West
Party	Candidate	Votes	%	±%
Municipal Reform	Cyril Cobb	9,849	34.8	+0.0
Municipal Reform	Frank Hobbs	9,588	33.8	+1.6
Labour	Robert Mark Gentry	4,555	16.1	−1.5
Labour	I. M. Lineham	4,350	15.3	−0.1
Majority		5,033	17.7	+3.1
Municipal Reform hold		Swing		
Municipal Reform hold		Swing		

1925 London County Council election: Fulham West
Party	Candidate	Votes	%	±%
Municipal Reform	Cyril Cobb	6,872		
Municipal Reform	Frank Hobbs	6,379		
Labour	Joan Howson	4,162		
Labour	Christopher Lancaster	4,135		
Majority				
Municipal Reform hold		Swing		
Municipal Reform hold		Swing		

1928 London County Council election: Fulham West
Party	Candidate	Votes	%	±%
Municipal Reform	Cyril Cobb	6,818		
Municipal Reform	Frank Hobbs	6,406		
Labour	George Spero	5,630		
Labour	Christopher Lancaster	5,621		
Liberal	Robert Wilson Black	4,449		
Liberal	Walter Cunningham	4,005		
Majority				
Municipal Reform hold		Swing		
Municipal Reform hold		Swing		

1931 London County Council election: Fulham West
Party	Candidate	Votes	%	±%
Municipal Reform	Cyril Cobb	7,626		
Municipal Reform	George Gordon	6,877		
Labour	Christopher Lancaster	5,025		
Labour	Monica Whately	4,758		
Liberal	Robert Wilson Black	2,586		
Liberal	Edgar Gale Hardy	2,111		
Majority				
Municipal Reform hold		Swing		
Municipal Reform hold		Swing		

1934 London County Council election: Fulham West
Party	Candidate	Votes	%	±%
Labour	Christopher Lancaster	8,560		
Labour	Leah L'Estrange Malone	8,282		
Municipal Reform	Cyril Cobb	7,902		
Municipal Reform	George Gordon	7,599		
Majority				
Labour gain from Municipal Reform		Swing		
Labour gain from Municipal Reform		Swing		

1937 London County Council election: Fulham West
Party	Candidate	Votes	%	±%
Labour	Christopher Lancaster	10,480		
Municipal Reform	Geoffrey Weston Aplin	10,255		
Municipal Reform	R. Etherton	10,230		
Labour	Leah L'Estrange Malone	10,071		
Majority				
Labour hold		Swing		
Municipal Reform gain from Labour		Swing		

1946 London County Council election: Fulham West
Party	Candidate	Votes	%	±%
Labour	Frank Banfield	9,610		
Labour	Christopher Lancaster	9,589		
Conservative	Geoffrey Weston Aplin	5,576		
Conservative	P. F. Remnant	5,477		
Majority				
Labour hold		Swing		
Labour gain from Municipal Reform		Swing		

1949 London County Council election: Fulham West
Party	Candidate	Votes	%	±%
Labour	Frank Banfield	12,382		
Conservative	Ian Mactaggart	12,216		
Labour	Ethel Rankin	12,073		
Labour	Eleanor Nathan	12,054		
Conservative	J. Haggie	12,052		
Conservative	E. Hoare	12,033		
Labour hold		Swing		
Labour hold		Swing		
Conservative win (new seat)				

1952 London County Council election: Fulham West
Party	Candidate	Votes	%	±%
Labour	Frank Banfield	15,192		
Labour	Ethel Rankin	15,073		
Labour	Richard Edmonds	14,742		
Conservative	Ian Mactaggart	11,360		
Conservative	J. Haggie	11,317		
Conservative	P. B. Kenyon	11,229		
Labour gain from Conservative		Swing		
Labour hold		Swing		
Labour hold		Swing		
