= Audrey Lees (politician) =

British politician (1906–2006)

Lucy Audrey Lees (7 September 1906 – 22 February 2006) was a British politician.

Born in Oxford as Lucy Audrey Lynam, she was educated at a convent school, and knew John Betjeman in her youth; he mentioned her in Summoned by Bells. Lees trained as a children's nurse, and qualified when she was 20, working at Paddington Green Children's Hospital in London. She left to study social science at the London School of Economics, and became an almoner for St Thomas' Hospital. In 1938, she married Stanley Lees and had 4 children; Joanna, Richard, Gill and Christopher.

Lees strongly supported the creation of the National Health Service, and this spurred her to join the Labour Party. At the 1952 London County Council election, she was elected in Hammersmith South. The seat was replaced by Barons Court at the 1955 election, and she was defeated, but she regained the seat at the 1958 election. On the council, Lees' main interest was education, and in 1962 she was co-opted as a member of the Inner London Education Authority.

The council was abolished in 1965, and Lees became a social worker, working until the early 1980s. In 1982, she was a founder of the Alzheimer's Society, and devoted the remained of her life to it, remaining active into her late nineties. She died, aged 99, in 2006.
