= List of parliamentary constituencies in Hackney =

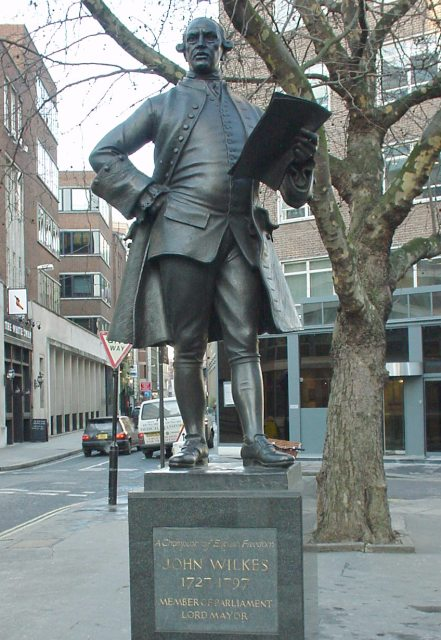
Statue of John Wilkes (Fetter Lane, London). Member of Parliament for Middlesex 1768-1769 and 1774-1790.

The Hackney, Shoreditch, and Stoke Newington areas of North London, England, have been represented in the House of Commons of the Parliament of the United Kingdom through several parliamentary constituencies. Previous to the enfranchisement by division of the Hackney constituency in 1868, representation in Parliament was by two knights of the shire returned by the county constituency of Middlesex.

The table is only illustrative and not to scale.

	1868–1885	1885–1918	1918–1950	1950–1955	1955–1974	1974–1983	1983–present
Hackney	1868–1885						
Hackney South		1885–1955					
Hackney Central		1885–1950			1955–1983		
Hackney North		1885–1950					
Stoke Newington			1918–1950				
Shoreditch			1918–1950				
Hackney North & Stoke Newington				1950–present			
Shoreditch & Finsbury				1950–February 1974			
Hackney South & Shoreditch						February 1974–present	

== See also ==
- List of parliamentary constituencies in London
