= 1955 London County Council election =

1955 local election in England

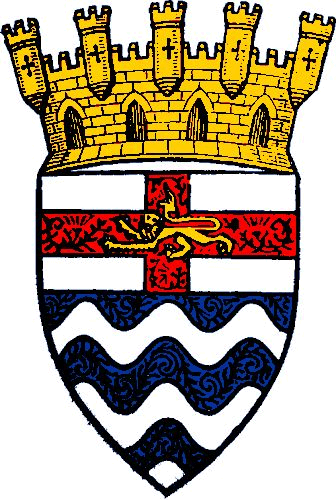
- 31 March 1955
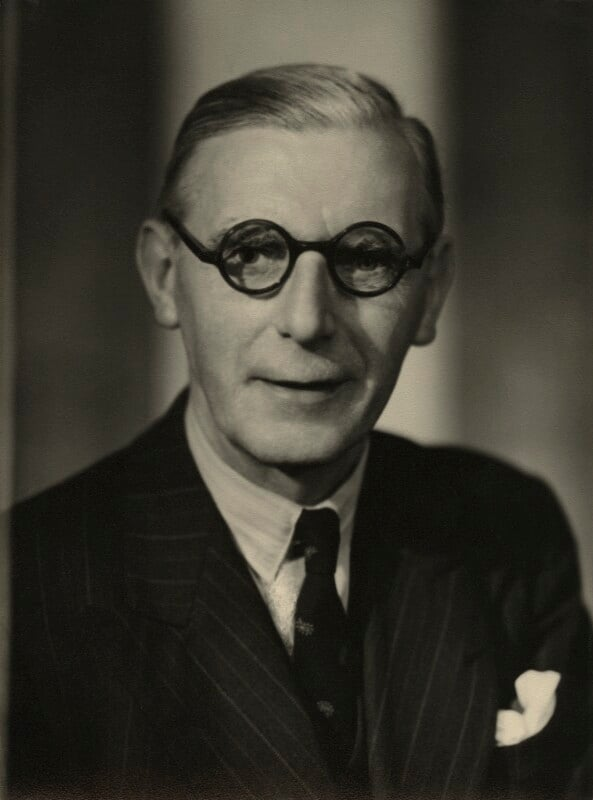
	First party	Second party
Leader	Isaac Hayward	Norris Kenyon
Party	Labour	Conservative
Leader since	1947	1952
Leader's seat	Alderman	Paddington South
Seats won	74	52
Seat change	▼18	▲15
Popular vote	1,143,948	956,543
Percentage	50.5%	47.5%

An election to the County Council of London took place on 31 March 1955. The council was elected by First Past the Post with each elector having three votes in the three-member seats. The Conservative Party made significant gains, but the Labour Party retained a substantial majority.

The size of the council was cut by three members, with Fulham East, Fulham West and Hammersmith South abolished, and replaced in part by the new constituencies of Barons Court and Fulham. This mirrored changes to constituencies for the House of Commons which were implemented at the 1955 general election, shortly afterwards.

== Campaign ==
The Labour Party began their campaign with a celebration at the Royal Festival Hall, to mark twenty-one years of running the council, and the twenty-fifth anniversary of the Daily Herald. A newspaper strike limited coverage of the election; the Manchester Guardian noted that there were fewer posters and fewer meetings than in previous elections, although parties were doing more doorstep campaigning.

The Labour Party manifesto proposed more comprehensive schools, and championed their programmes of house building and improved services for children and elderly people. The Conservative Party opposed comprehensive schools, and argued that the council wasted money, proposing that civic restaurants should be closed and residential nurseries reduce their costs. Several constituencies were expected to see close battles between the two: Battersea South, Holborn and St Pancras South, Wandsworth Central and Woolwich West. Barons Court was considered an unknown, as a completely new seat.

The Liberal Party manifesto proposed more housing, schools, nurseries and play areas, with their highest hopes of a seat being in Bethnal Green. The Communist Party focused on housing and opposition to nuclear weapons.

== Results ==
The Conservatives gained fourteen seats from Labour. Barons Court was particularly closely fought, with six recounts required before the result was announced: two Labour seats, and one Conservative. Once the new and abolished seats were taken into account, Labour were down 18 seats, and the Conservatives up 15.

Turnout was particularly low, at 32%. In Woolwich West, it reached 55.9%, but in Stepney it fell to only 17.6%.

Party	Votes			Seats	
Party	Number	%	Stood	Seats	%
Labour	1,143,948	50.5	126	74	58.7
Conservative	956,543	47.5	126	52	41.3
Liberal	27,615	1.2	34	0	0.0
Communist	11,473	0.5	13	0	0.0
Union Movement	5,053	0.2	9	0	0.0
Independent	2,160	0.1	4	0	0.0
