= 1938 Fulham West by-election =

UK Parliamentary by-election

The 1938 Fulham West by-election was held on 6 April 1938. The by-election was held due to the death of the incumbent Conservative MP, Cyril Cobb. It was won by the Labour candidate Edith Summerskill.

Fulham West by-election, 1938
Party	Candidate	Votes	%	±%
Labour	Edith Summerskill	16,583	52.2	+8.9
Conservative	Charles John Busby	15,162	47.8	−5.6
Majority		1,421	4.4	N/A
Turnout		31,745	66.5	−3.4
Labour gain from Conservative		Swing	+7.3	
