= Robert Gentry =

Robert Gentry may refer to:

- Robert Gentry (actor) (1940–2022), American actor known for roles on several soap operas
- Robert Mark Gentry (1885–1951), British politician and trade unionist
- Robert V. Gentry (1930–2020), American nuclear physicist, creationist
