= Barons Court (London County Council constituency) =

London County Council constituency

- Former constituency for the London County Council

Former constituency
- Created: 1955
- Abolished: 1965
- Member(s): 3
- Created from: Fulham East, Fulham West and Hammersmith South

Barons Court was a constituency used for elections to the London County Council between 1955 and the council's abolition, in 1965. The seat shared boundaries with the UK Parliament constituency of the same name.

== Councillors ==
Year	Name	Party	Name	Party	Name	Party
1955	Frank Banfield	Labour	Bill Fiske	Labour	Lilian Madge Dugdale	Conservative
1958	Frank Banfield	Labour	Bill Fiske	Labour	Audrey Lees	Labour

== Election results ==
1955 London County Council election: Barons Court
Party	Candidate	Votes	%	±%
Labour	Frank Banfield	10,946		
Labour	Bill Fiske	10,872		
Conservative	Madge Dugdale	10,832		
Conservative	Bill Carr	10,825		
Labour	Audrey Lees	10,821		
Conservative	G. K. Messervy	10,581		

1958 London County Council election: Barons Court
Party	Candidate	Votes	%	±%
Labour	Frank Banfield	11,334		
Labour	Bill Fiske	11,322		
Labour	Audrey Lees	11,122		
Conservative	Bill Carr	6,885		
Conservative	Rosemary Longstaff	6,670		
Conservative	Madge Dugdale	6,841		
Liberal	T. Brooks	1,584		
Liberal	B. L. Davis	1,413		
Liberal	W. J. Searle	1,347		
Labour hold		Swing		
Labour hold		Swing		
Labour gain from Conservative		Swing		

1961 London County Council election: Barons Court
Party	Candidate	Votes	%	±%
Labour	Frank Banfield	11,073		
Labour	Bill Fiske	10,695		
Labour	Audrey Lees	10,330		
Conservative	B. J. Daniels	10,251		
Conservative	L. C. McCracken	9,891		
Conservative	V. C. Arundell	9,861		
Liberal	Simon Harold John Arthur Knott	1,053		
Liberal	R. J. Groves	964		
Liberal	J. L. Roberts	927		
Labour hold		Swing		
