= Charles Buchan =

Charles Buchan may refer to:

- Charlie Buchan (1891–1960), English football player and writer
- Charles Forbes Buchan (1869–1954), British Army officer
