= Barons Court (disambiguation) =

Barons Court could refer to:

- Barons Court, a part of West Kensington, London
  - Barons Court tube station
  - Barons Court (London County Council constituency), former constituency
  - Barons Court (UK Parliament constituency), former constituency
- Baronscourt, a country house in Northern Ireland
