= F. L. Kerran =

Labour activist and politician (1883–1949)

Ferdinand Louis Kerran (1883–1949) was a British political activist, prominent in the labour movement.

Born in Chester, as Ferdinand Kehrhahn, Kerran's father was a German who had settled in England. Kerran joined the Independent Labour Party (ILP) in 1906, then the Social Democratic Federation in 1908. This became the British Socialist Party (BSP), in which Kerran was a prominent left-winger; by 1913, he was its National Trading Secretary. However, he was also active in the antisemitic League for Clean Government, organising its campaign in the 1913 South Lanarkshire by-election.

Outside politics, he ran a photography business and was a supporter of women's suffrage, having been described as the "semi-official" photographer of the Women's Social and Political Union.

Due to his German heritage, Kerran was interned at the start of World War I. He was imprisoned in Islington Workhouse, which was at the time used for internment. Here he met the prominent Bolsheviks Georgy Chicherin, Maxim Litvinov and Peter Petroff. In November 1916, he escaped and impersonated a sailor, managing to travel as far as New York City on the SS Adriatic before he was recaptured. He was sentenced to three months in prison for the escapade, but this was overturned on appeal and he was instead returned to an internment camp. There, he was interviewed by an officer from MI5. He offered to travel to Germany to become involved in the revolutionary movement there, but this offer was rejected.

In 1920, Kerran followed the BSP in joining the new Communist Party of Great Britain (CPGB) and was a member of the party's first executive. He was a party delegate to the Third World Congress of the Communist International, but he left the CPGB in 1923, as the Labour Party had decided not to permit CPGB members to hold joint membership, and he wished to contest elections as a Labour candidate. This he did, standing unsuccessfully in Kingston upon Hull North West at the 1924 general election, in Stoke Newington in 1929 and 1931, and in Luton in 1935.

Having failed in his Parliamentary contested, by 1935, Kerran was a car worker, and he looked outside the UK for further political activism. He became an advisor to King Zog of Albania, focusing on opposition to fascism, and in 1937 undertook a dangerous air journey from Hong Kong to San Francisco. In 1939, he worked in Germany to help Jews escape the Nazi regime, transporting letters of recommendation from Wilhelm Furtwängler.

== Gallery ==
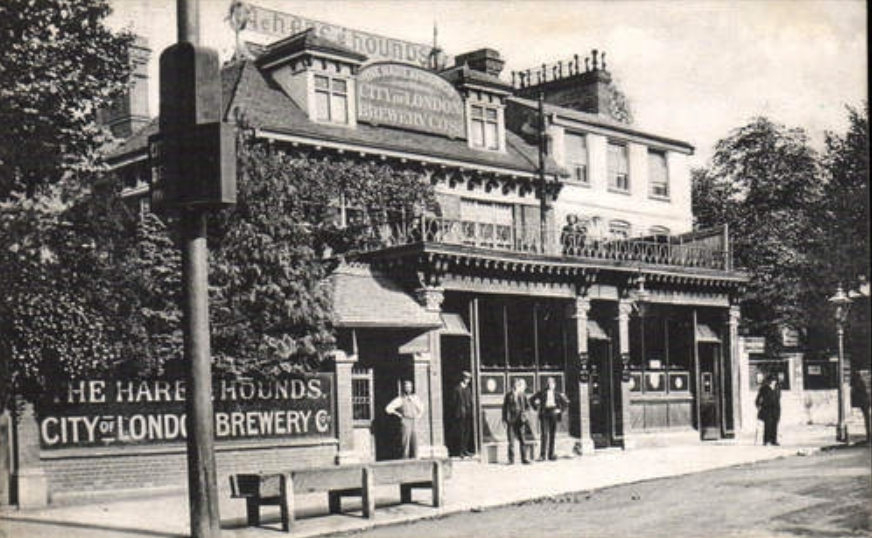
Hare and Hounds, Hampstead
