= Vera Dart =

British politician

Vera Dart (5 January 1892 – 1 April 1984) was a British politician, who served on London County Council.

Born in Liverpool, Dart was educated privately. She became a social worker, and during World War II was the Women's Voluntary Service's administrator for North West England. For her efforts, she was made an Officer of the Order of the British Empire in 1941. Later in the war, she joined the Ministry of Works, and opened canteens at open-cast mining sites.

Dart became active in the Labour Party, and stood unsuccessfully in Tonbridge at the 1945 United Kingdom general election. At the 1946 London County Council election, she was elected in Hammersmith South. She lost her seat in 1949, but was instead appointed as an alderman. At the 1950 and 1951 United Kingdom general elections, Dart stood unsuccessfully in Southgate. Thereafter, she devoted her time to the county council, serving as chair of its children's committee from 1949 until 1952, and for a year on the Central Training Council on Child Care.

Dart stood down from the council in 1955, but from 1958 until 1963 served on the Council on Tribunals.
