= Edith Summerskill =

British politician (1901–1980)

The Right Honourable The Baroness Summerskill CH PC
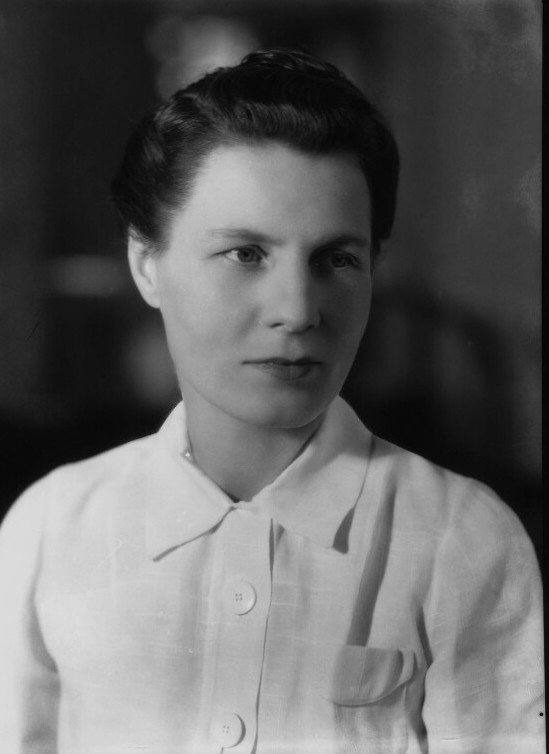
- Summerskill in 1940

Minister of National Insurance
- In office 28 February 1950 – 26 October 1951
- Prime Minister: Clement Attlee
- Preceded by: James Griffiths
- Succeeded by: Osbert Peake

Parliamentary Secretary to the Ministry of Food
- In office 4 August 1945 – 28 February 1950
- Prime Minister: Clement Attlee
- Preceded by: Florence Horsbrugh
- Succeeded by: Stanley Evans

Member of the House of Lords Lord Temporal
- In office 4 February 1961 – 4 February 1980; Life peerage

Member of Parliament for Warrington
- In office 26 May 1955 – 4 February 1961
- Preceded by: Hyacinth Morgan
- Succeeded by: Thomas Williams

Member of Parliament for Fulham West
- In office 6 April 1938 – 6 May 1955
- Preceded by: Cyril Cobb
- Succeeded by: Constituency Abolished

Personal details
- Born: 19 April 1901
- Died: 4 February 1980 (aged 78)
- Party: Labour
- Spouse: Dr Jeffrey Samuel
- Children: Shirley Summerskill
- Education: King's College London; Charing Cross Hospital Medical School

Edith Clara Summerskill, Baroness Summerskill, CH, PC (19 April 1901 – 4 February 1980) was a British physician, feminist, Labour politician and writer. She was appointed to the Privy Council in 1949.

== Early life ==
Summerskill attended Eltham Hill Grammar School. She then went to King's College London, and was admitted to medical school at Charing Cross Hospital Medical School, one of the earliest women to be admitted to medical school.

She was one of the founders of the Socialist Health Association, which spearheaded the National Health Service (1948). She pressed for equal rights for women in the British Home Guard. In 1938, she was involved with the Married Women's Association to promote equality in marriage. It was formed as a splinter group that was created with Juanita Frances as its first chair. Summerskill became its first president.

== Parliament ==
Summerskill entered politics at 32 when she was asked to fight the Green Lanes ward in Harringay in the Middlesex County Council elections. She then served as a councillor on Middlesex County Council from 1934 until 1941. She stood for a seat in the House of Commons unsuccessfully at the Putney byelection in 1934 and Bury at the 1935 general election, before becoming Labour Member of Parliament (MP) for Fulham West at a by-election in 1938 thanks to the working women's vote. She caused some disquiet by taking the seat in her maiden name. When the Fulham West constituency was abolished for the 1955 general election, she was returned to the House of Commons as MP for Warrington. She had a London flat in Ennismore Gardens.

Summerskill was included in Clement Attlee's Labour government following the election victory in 1945. She served as a Parliamentary Secretary in the Ministry of Food, and was later promoted to the Ministry of Social and National Insurance, heading the department she was profiled as the Minister of National Insurance, however she was not a cabinet minister.

As well as her service in government, Summerskill also served on the House of Commons Political Honours Scrutiny Committee from 1967 to 1976.

Summerskill served as Parliamentary Secretary to the Ministry of Food (1945–50) and as Minister of National Insurance (1950–51). She was a member of the Labour Party's National Executive Committee from 1944 to 1958 and served as Chair of the Labour Party 1954–5). She left the House of Commons in 1961 and was created a life peer as Baroness Summerskill, of Ken Wood in the County of London on 4 February 1961. Furthermore, she was awarded an additional honour, being initiated into the Order of the Companions of Honour (CH) in 1966.

Summerskill appears in a specially selected list of Fabian Society members from 1942 to 1947, showing continuity and prestige. An active feminist, she was instrumental in promoting women's causes throughout that period, starting with the Clean Milk Act in 1949. She was an early advocate for equal pay and supported the Equal Pay Campaign Committee in their cross-party efforts. In 1954 she joined Patricia Ford, Irene Ward and Barbara Castle to submit the 'Equal Pay in the public services' petition, with over 80,000 signatures, to Parliament. The four politicians arrived together in a horse drawn carriage decorated in suffragette colours.

Later, as the president of the Married Women's Association, she campaigned in and outside the parliament to assure the equal rights of housewives and of divorced women, which resulted in the Married Women's Properties Act in 1964 and the Matrimonial Homes Act in 1967.

== Letters to My Daughter ==
During the 1950s, Summerskill wrote a series of letters to her daughter Shirley, who, like her mother, was an active feminist. Shirley studied medicine in Oxford at that time and later became a doctor and a Member of Parliament and of Cabinet. Edith Summerskill's letters to Shirley were collected and published in a book Letters to My Daughter (1957). Summerskill outlines her belief that women are superior to men in almost every way. In support of such a theory Summerskill presents three "facts": firstly, that only women can enjoy two worlds of creative enterprise, the biological and the intellectual. Secondly, she suggests women are physically stronger, live longer, and are constitutionally tougher, having greater stamina. Finally, she believes women have equal if not greater intellect than men.

Although Summerskill's book contains only Edith's letters to her daughter, the mother's response to questions raised by the daughter creates a sense of an ongoing dialogue between the two, concerning issues of education for women, equality and achievements. In reply to Shirley's question about the part that married women are playing in the affairs of the country, her mother writes:

The insistent demand of women for recognition in spheres of work outside the home, which has quietly but unremittingly been advanced in the course of the last hundred years, has grudgingly been conceded. As a doctor and a Member of Parliament I am fully conscious of the fact that the doors both of the medical schools and of the House of Commons had to be forced by furious and frustrated women before their claims were recognized. It would be quite inaccurate to suggest that we were welcomed into the universities or into public life. (143)

Summerskill constantly struggles for and raises consciousness about women's equal rights. In response to Shirley's complaint about "the stock question" of the anti-feminists, "Why have not more women achieved eminence in the arts and sciences?" She answers: "Personally I am astounded that so many have distinguished themselves despite the conditions which society has imposed upon them" (181). Summerskill maintains that in spite of the difficulties and prejudices, women are making progress and have achievements in music, visual art, and literature as well as some advancement in science and technology (181). Yet Summerskill's conclusion in 1956 is similar to the one Virginia Woolf reached twenty-five years earlier. Woolf writes that even when all the outward obstacles are overcome, she, or any other a woman, has not solved the problem of "my own experiences as a body" (1942: 206); Summerskill makes the parallel concession that for a woman, the "most powerful force, which takes her off the course" is the "biological urge to have a family" (187).

== Personal life ==
Summerskill was married in 1925 to Dr Jeffrey Samuel. Their children took their mother's surname. Her daughter, Shirley Summerskill, also served as a physician, member of parliament and government minister. Her grandson Ben Summerskill became chief executive of the British gay equality charity Stonewall in 2003.

== Publications ==
- Babies without Tears (1941)
- Wanted—babies: A trenchant examination of a grave national problem (1943)
- Letters to my Daughter (1957)
- The Ignoble Art (1957)
- A Woman's World: Memoirs (1967)

Parliament of the United Kingdom
Preceded by Sir Cyril Cobb	Member of Parliament for Fulham West; 1938–1955	constituency abolished
Preceded by Dr Hyacinth Morgan	Member of Parliament for Warrington; 1955–1961	Succeeded by Sir Thomas Williams
Political offices
Preceded by James Griffiths	Minister of National Insurance; 1950–1951	Succeeded by Osbert Peake
Party political offices
Preceded by Wilfrid Burke	Chair of the Labour Party; 1954–1955	Succeeded by Edwin Gooch
