= Mid Lanarkshire =

Parliamentary constituency in the United Kingdom, 1885–1918

Coordinates: 55.810°N 4.210°W

- Former county constituency for the House of Commons
- Subdivisions of Scotland: county of Lanark

1885–1918
- Seats: One
- Created from: South Lanarkshire, North Lanarkshire
- Replaced by: Hamilton, Rutherglen, Lanark

Mid Lanarkshire was a county constituency of the House of Commons of the Parliament of the United Kingdom (Westminster) from 1885 to 1918. It elected one Member of Parliament (MP) by the first past the post voting system.

== Boundaries ==
The name relates the constituency to the county of Lanark. The Redistribution of Seats Act 1885 provided that the Mid division was to consist of "the parishes of Rutherglen, Carmunnock, so much of the parish of Cathcart as adjoins the two last-mentioned parishes, Cambuslang, Blantyre, so much of the parish of Hamilton as lies south and west of the River Clyde, Dalserf and Cambusnethan".

== Members of Parliament ==
Election	Member	Party
1885	Stephen Mason	Liberal
1888 by-election	John Philipps, later Viscount St Davids	Liberal
1894 by-election	James Caldwell	Liberal
Jan. 1910	John Howard Whitehouse	Liberal
1918	constituency abolished	

== Elections ==
Decades:	1880s; 1890s; 1900s; 1910s

=== Elections in the 1880s ===
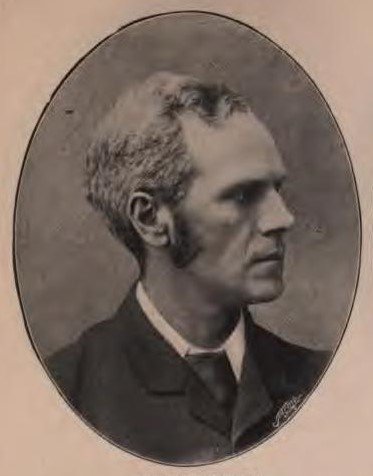
Bousfield

General election 1885: Mid Lanarkshire
Party	Candidate	Votes	%	±%
Liberal	Stephen Mason	2,875	39.0	
Conservative	William Robert Bousfield	2,579	35.0	
Independent Liberal	John Clark Forrest	1,913	26.0	
Majority		296	4.0	
Turnout		7,367	82.4	
Registered electors		8,939		
Liberal win (new seat)				

General election 1886: Mid Lanarkshire
Party	Candidate	Votes	%	±%
Liberal	Stephen Mason	3,779	56.5	+17.5
Liberal Unionist	James Widrington Shand-Harvey	2,909	43.5	+8.5
Majority		870	13.0	+9.0
Turnout		6,688	74.8	−7.6
Registered electors		8,939		
Liberal hold		Swing	+4.5	

Mason's resignation caused a by-election.

Philipps

By-election, 27 Apr 1888: Mid Lanarkshire
Party	Candidate	Votes	%	±%
Liberal	John Philipps	3,847	52.1	−4.4
Conservative	William Robert Bousfield	2,917	39.5	−4.0
Independent Labour	Keir Hardie	617	8.4	New
Majority		930	12.6	−0.4
Turnout		7,381	80.7	+5.9
Registered electors		9,143		
Liberal hold		Swing	-0.2	

=== Elections in the 1890s ===
General election 1892: Mid Lanarkshire
Party	Candidate	Votes	%	±%
Liberal	John Philipps	4,611	56.9	+0.4
Conservative	Robert Edward Stuart Harington-Stuart	3,489	43.1	−0.4
Majority		1,122	13.8	+0.8
Turnout		8,100	77.2	+2.4
Registered electors		10,496		
Liberal hold		Swing	+0.4	

Caldwell

1894 Mid Lanarkshire by-election
Party	Candidate	Votes	%	±%
Liberal	James Caldwell	3,965	45.0	−11.9
Liberal Unionist	Robert Edward Stuart Harington-Stuart	3,635	41.2	−1.9
Scottish Labour	Robert Smillie	1,221	13.8	New
Majority		330	3.8	−10.0
Turnout		8,821	78.1	+0.9
Registered electors		11,294		
Liberal hold		Swing	-5.0	

General election 1895: Mid Lanarkshire
Party	Candidate	Votes	%	±%
Liberal	James Caldwell	4,447	50.4	−6.5
Conservative	Charles Kincaid MacKenzie	4,376	49.6	+6.5
Majority		71	0.8	−13.0
Turnout		8,823	77.4	+0.2
Registered electors		11,392		
Liberal hold		Swing	−6.5	

=== Elections in the 1900s ===
General election 1900: Mid Lanarkshire
Party	Candidate	Votes	%	±%
Liberal	James Caldwell	5,267	50.9	+0.5
Conservative	Charles Kincaid MacKenzie	5,075	49.1	−0.5
Majority		192	1.8	+1.0
Turnout		10,342	79.6	+2.2
Registered electors		12,998		
Liberal hold		Swing	+0.5	

General election 1906: Mid Lanarkshire
Party	Candidate	Votes	%	±%
Liberal	James Caldwell	7,246	58.1	+7.2
Conservative	Duncan Campbell	4,470	35.8	−13.3
Musical Copyright Association	A.S. Gibson	758	6.1	New
Majority		2,776	22.3	+20.5
Turnout		12,474	81.1	+1.5
Registered electors		15,375		
Liberal hold		Swing	+10.2	

=== Elections in the 1910s ===
Smillie

General election January 1910: Mid Lanarkshire
Party	Candidate	Votes	%	±%
Liberal	John Howard Whitehouse	5,792	38.4	−19.7
Conservative	John Johnson Pickering	5,401	35.9	+0.1
Labour	Robert Smillie	3,864	25.7	New
Majority		391	2.5	−19.8
Turnout		15,057	84.6	+3.5
Registered electors		18,484		
Liberal hold		Swing	-9.9	

Whitehouse

General election December 1910: Mid Lanarkshire
Party	Candidate	Votes	%	±%
Liberal	John Howard Whitehouse	6,033	38.7	+0.3
Conservative	Henry Keith	5,702	36.6	+0.7
Labour	Robert Smillie	3,847	24.7	−1.0
Majority		331	2.1	−0.4
Turnout		15,582	84.3	−0.3
Registered electors		18,484		
Liberal hold		Swing	-0.2	

General election 1914–15:

Another general election was required to take place before the end of 1915. The political parties had been making preparations for an election to take place and by July 1914, the following candidates had been selected;

- Liberal: John Howard Whitehouse
- Unionist:
- Labour: Robert Smillie

== See also ==
- 1888 Mid Lanarkshire by-election
