= Charles Forbes Buchan =

British Army officer (1869–1954)

Lieutenant-Colonel Charles Forbes Buchan CBE OStJ
- Born: 1869
- Died: 30 April 1954 (aged 84–85)
- Education: Bedford Modern School
- Military career
- Allegiance: United Kingdom
- Branch: British Army
- Rank: Lieutenant-Colonel
- Awards: CBE; Mentioned in Despatches (1)
- Other work: Hon. Treasurer of the Navy League; Hon. Treasurer of Training Ship Stork

Lieutenant-Colonel Charles Forbes Buchan CBE OStJ (1869–1954) was Deputy Assistant Director at the War Office during World War I and was, for many years, Honorary Treasurer of the Navy League and the Training Ship Stork at Hammersmith. He was invested CBE in 1919 for his service during World War I and in 1939 was made an Officer of St. John in recognition of his work for the Navy League.

== Life ==
Buchan was born in 1869, the son of Charles Forbes Buchan M.D., a military surgeon. He was educated at Bedford Modern School between 1881 and 1885.

Buchan was a Major in the Territorial Force Reserve in 1914 and served throughout World War I attaining the rank of Lieutenant-Colonel as Deputy Assistant Director at the War Office. He was mentioned in despatches and was made CBE in 1919 for valuable services rendered during the war.

Buchan left the War Office in 1919 and was for many years thereafter Honorary Treasurer of the Navy League and a member of its executive committee during Lord Linlithgow's presidency and when Sir Cyril Cobb was chairman of the executive committee. He was also Honorary Treasurer and Secretary of the Training Ship Stork at Hammersmith and in 1926 organised a fundraising Ball in aid of the ship at the Hyde Park Hotel in London. In 1939 he was invested as an Officer of St. John for his work with the Navy League.

Buchan was a member of the Royal Thames Yacht Club. In 1898 he married Margaret Hume, the daughter of Captain Walter Hume of North Devon, who predeceased him. Buchan died on 30 April 1954.
