= Ethel Rankin =

British politician (1893–1956)

Ethel Rankin JP
- Born: Ethel Mary Stock; 28 August 1893; Braintree, Essex, England
- Died: 5 December 1956 (aged 63); Chelsea, London, England
- Occupation: Politician
- Political party: Labour Party
- Spouse: Walter Rankin (m. 1917)
- Children: 1 son

Ethel Mary Rankin JP (née Stock, 28 August 1893 – 5 December 1956), was a British politician.

== Early life ==
Rankin was born and grew up in Braintree, in Essex.

== Career ==
She was living in Fulham by 1934, when she was elected to Fulham Metropolitan Borough Council for the Labour Party. In 1945, she was appointed to the Central Health Services Council.

In 1949, Rankin was elected as a member of the London County Council (LCC) from 1949, for Fulham West and later its successor seat, Fulham, and the LCC's vice chairman from 1955, serving until her death in 1956.

Rankin was the Mayor of Fulham for 1954/55, and in 1955 was made a Freeman of the Borough of Fulham. She was also a justice of the peace. Ethel Rankin Court is a block of flat built by the Council, and named in her honour, in Landridge Road, Fulham.

== Personal life ==
In 1917, she married Walter Rankin, a printer and politician, who was also an LCC member for Fulham, winning a by-election occasioned by her death. They had one son.
