= William Banfield =

British trade unionist and politician

John William Banfield
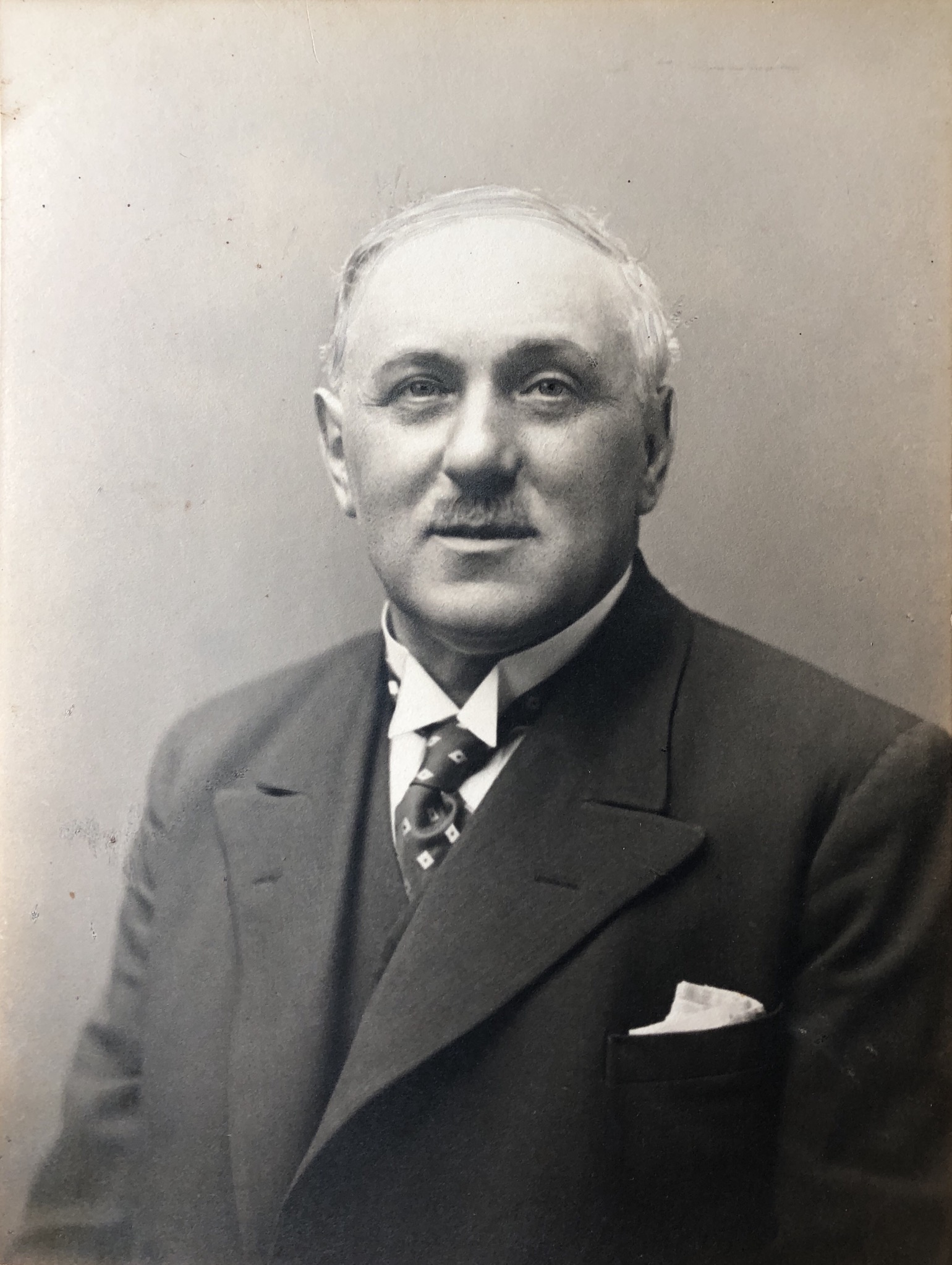

Member of Parliament for Wednesbury
- In office 1932 – 25 May 1945
- Preceded by: Viscount Ednam
- Succeeded by: Stanley Evans

Personal details
- Born: John William Simnett; 29 August 1875 Burton upon Trent, Staffordshire, England
- Died: 25 May 1945 (aged 69) Hammersmith, London, England
- Citizenship: British
- Party: Labour
- Spouse: Annie Elizabeth Newman (m. 1897)
- Children: Annie Banfield; William Banfield; Frederick John Banfield; Frank Walter Banfield; Mabel Gladys Banfield
- Parents: Frederick Charles Banfield; Mary Ann Simnett
- Occupation: Confectioner, baker, Trade Union Secretary, M.P.

John William Banfield (29 August 1875 – 25 May 1945) was a British trade unionist and Labour Party politician, who served as Member of Parliament (MP) for Wednesbury from 1932 until his death in 1945.

== Early life ==
Banfield was born in Burton-upon-Trent on 29 August 1875, the eldest of 9 children of Frederick Charles Banfield (b. 4 May 1853, d. 16 Jan 1898), a blacksmith, brewer's labourer and upholsterer's assistant, and Mary Ann Simnett. He worked as a confectioner and baker, and was General Secretary of the Amalgamated Union of Operative Bakers, Confectioners and Allied Workers from 1915 until he retired in 1940.

== Political career ==
Banfield unsuccessfully contested the 1918 general election in Birmingham Aston. When the Labour Party unexpectedly gained control of Fulham Borough Council in 1919 they added Banfield to the Aldermanic bench to add political and trade union expertise.

Banfield was a government delegate representing the work people at Geneva from 1924 to 1925. He was unsuccessful in Fulham West at a by-election in 1930 and at the 1931 general election.

In 1932, the Conservative MP for Wednesbury, Viscount Ednam succeeded to the peerage as Earl of Dudley, triggering a by-election in July 1932. Banfield was selected as Labour's candidate, hoping to regain a seat which had been held by Labour from 1918 to 1931.

After a campaign focusing on the means test for unemployment benefit (in a constituency with 12,000 unemployed), Banfield won the Wednesbury 1932 by-election, defeating Conservative Rex Davis. He was re-elected at the 1935 general election.

In December 1936, he delivered an address, 'Sunday: An M.P.'s Convictions' at the Alliance Birthday Celebrations of the Imperial Alliance for the Defence of Sunday, arguing that Sunday should be a day of rest and worship. In June 1937, he made a speech in Parliament, proposing the addition of a clause to the Factories Bill: Prohibition of night work in bakehouses. His campaigning led to him being known as "The Bakers' MP".

Banfield died aged 69, in Hammersmith, London of a heart attack shortly before the 1945 general election.

== Personal life and legacy ==
On 5 September 1897, he married Annie Elizabeth Newman, daughter of baker John Newman, in Birmingham.

A block of council flats, William Banfield House in Munster Road, Fulham was named after him. His son, Frank Banfield, also became a prominent politician in Hammersmith and Fulham.

He is buried in North Sheen Cemetery, Richmond, with his wife Annie Elizabeth and his daughter Annie.

Parliament of the United Kingdom
Preceded by The Viscount Ednam	Member of Parliament for Wednesbury; 1932–1945	Succeeded by Stanley Evans
Trade union offices
Preceded by John Jenkins	General Secretary of the Amalgamated Union of Operative Bakers; 1915–1940	Succeeded by Joseph Thomasson
