= 1930 Fulham West by-election =

UK Parliamentary by-election

The 1930 Fulham West by-election was held on 6 May 1930. The by-election was held due to the resignation of the incumbent Labour MP, Ernest Spero citing ill health (although he was shortly to be declared bankrupt). It was won by the Conservative candidate Cyril Cobb.

== Background ==
Sir Cyril Cobb, the Unionist candidate, had been the Member of Parliament for Fulham West from 1918 until he lost the seat to Ernest Spero in 1929, although in the previous two general elections his majority had been less than 2,000 votes. Cobb was also a long time member, and former chairman of the London County Council.

The Labour Party put forward John Banfield, an official in the Amalgamated Union of Operative Bakers, Confectioners and Allied Workers and a member of Fulham Borough Council. Unlike the previous general election the Liberals did not field a candidate.

== Result ==
Fulham West by-election, 1930
| Party | Candidate | Votes | % | ±% |
|---|---|---|---|---|
| Conservative | Cyril Cobb | 16,223 | 50.4 | +11.7 |
| Labour | John Banfield | 15,983 | 49.6 | +4.7 |
| Majority | | 240 | 0.8 | N/A |
| Turnout | | 32,206 | 63.6 | −7.7 |
| Conservative gain from Labour | | Swing | +3.5 | |

Cobb and Banfield contested the seat again at the next general election, with Cobb increasing his majority to over 12,000 votes.
