= Walter Rankin =

British printer, politician (1892–1965)

- Born: 1892; Braintree, Essex, England
- Died: 17 February 1965 (aged 72–73)
- Occupations: Printer and politician
- Spouse: Ethel Mary Stock (m. 1917; died 1956)
- Children: 1

Walter Rankin (1892 – 17 February 1965), was a British printer and politician.

== Early life ==
Walter Rankin was born and raised in Braintree, Essex.

== Career ==
In 1907, he began his printing apprenticeship with C Joscelyne, Printers, of Braintree, Essex.

In 1913 he joined J G Hammond and Co, of Birmingham, took a correspondence course, and sat the City and Guilds London Institute exams in 1915 and 1916. From 1916 to 1924, he worked for Manifoldia of Birmingham. From 1924 to 1927 for Century Press, Fulham Road, London.

In a 1957 by-election, following his wife's death in December 1956, Rankin was elected as a member of the London County Council (LCC) for Fulham, and remained an LCC member until its abolition in April 1965.

== Personal life ==
In 1917, he married Ethel Mary Stock, a politician, who was an LCC member for Fulham, from 1949 until she died in 1956, rising to vice chairman. They had one son.
