= Stephen Mason (MP) =

Stephen Mason (15 April 1832 – 21 April 1890) was a Scottish Liberal politician.

== Family and business ==
Mason was born at Kennoway in the Kingdom of Fife. He was educated locally in a private school. He married Martha Marshall of Machan in Lanarkshire.

Mason was originally a Glasgow merchant, a sometime chairman of Glasgow Chamber of Commerce. By 1889 he is recorded as being a member of the London Board and managing director of the English and Australian Mortgage Bank Ltd He was also a Justice of the peace in Glasgow.

His son, David Marshall Mason was an MP, being Liberal member for Coventry from 1910–1918 and Edinburgh East 1931–35

== Political career ==
Mason was elected as a Liberal Member of Parliament for Mid Lanarkshire in the 1885 general election defeating his Conservative opponent by 296 votes. At the 1886 election Mason held his seat with an increased majority 870, this time against Liberal Unionist opposition and emphasising his support of Irish Home Rule. He resigned from Parliament in 1888 by becoming Steward of the Manor of Northstead. It was reported that Mason had gone on a voyage to Australia.

== Death ==
Having previously been in what appeared to be good health, Mason died suddenly of heart disease at his London home in Streatham Hill on 21 April 1890.

Parliament of the United Kingdom
New constituency	Member of Parliament for Mid Lanarkshire; 1885–1888	Succeeded by John Philipps
