= Hackney North and Stoke Newington =

Parliamentary constituency in the United Kingdom, 1950 onwards

Coordinates: 51.56°N 0.07°W

- Borough constituency for the House of Commons
- Interactive map of boundaries from 2024
- Boundary of Hackney North and Stoke Newington in Greater London
- County: Greater London
- Electorate: 75,401 (March 2020)

Current constituency
- Created: 1950
- Member of Parliament: Diane Abbott (Labour)
- Seats: One
- Created from: Hackney North; Stoke Newington

Hackney North and Stoke Newington is a constituency (Note: A borough constituency (for the purposes of election expenses and type of returning officer)) represented in the House of Commons of the United Kingdom since 1987 by Diane Abbott, elected as a member of the Labour Party, who served as Shadow Home Secretary from 6 October 2016 to 5 April 2020. Abbott was one of the first three Black British MPs elected, and the first female Black British MP in the UK.

== Constituency profile ==
The constituency has always elected Labour MPs since its creation in 1950. While well connected to Central London, including the City of London, the seat generally has moderate incomes rather than high, and a narrow majority of wards had a relatively high ranking when placed in the Index of Multiple Deprivation, compiled in 2000. In line with most of Greater London since 2000 many parts, especially Stamford Hill, Upper Clapton, Lower Clapton have become marginal in terms of local councillors and these districts, with to a lesser extent the eponymous Hackney and Stoke Newington, are in the process of becoming re-gentrified with ongoing increases in land value, proximity to the London 2012 venues and a council that successfully reduced the level of crime by about 30% within a four-year period. Demographically, almost 60% of households are singletons and households have a higher than average level of unemployment.

In 1966, 14.4% of the constituency were born in the New Commonwealth. In 1971, 19% of the constituency were non-White. In 1981, 31% of the constituency were non-White.

Through all these changes, under incumbent Diane Abbott, the seat has remained a safe seat for Labour.

== History ==
The seat was created in 1950 and has gone through many changes: in January 2006 the boundary moved again, this time to correspond with the local government ward boundaries.

Following major electoral reform at the Redistribution of Seats Act 1885, also known as the Third Reform Act, the seat of Hackney was divided into two and Hackney North was formed, this time to return only one Member of Parliament, commencing with the 1885 general election.

The Stoke Newington constituency was created at the 1918 general election by the division of the Hackney North constituency by the Representation of the People Act 1918, known generally as Fourth Reform Act; an Act most importantly remembered for the first time extending suffrage to women. The constituency was identical in area to the Metropolitan Borough of Stoke Newington.

Following a decrease in the population the two constituencies were merged by the Representation of the People Act 1948, retaining David Weitzman as MP and becoming the current constituency in the 1950 general election.

Political history

The seat's narrowest majority of 18.3% was in 1979 and its greatest, 62.4%, was in 2017. The 2015 result made the seat the 18th safest of Labour's 232 seats by percentage of majority and seventh safest in London.

In the 2016 referendum to leave the European Union, the constituency voted remain by 79.1%. This was the third highest support for remain for a constituency.

== Boundaries ==
=== Historic ===
1950–1955: The Metropolitan Borough of Hackney wards of Leaside, Maury, Southwold, Springfield, and Stamford, and the Metropolitan Borough of Stoke Newington.

1955–1974: The Metropolitan Borough of Hackney wards of Northfield, Northwold, Rectory, and Springfield, and the Metropolitan Borough of Stoke Newington.

1974–1983: The London Borough of Hackney wards of Brownswood, Clissold, Defoe, New River, Northfield, Northwold, and Springfield.

Map of boundaries 2010–2024

1983–2010: The London Borough of Hackney wards of Brownswood, Clissold, Eastdown, Leabridge, New River, North Defoe, Northfield, Northwold, Rectory, South Defoe, and Springfield.

2010–2014: The London Borough of Hackney wards of Brownswood, Cazenove, Clissold, Dalston, Hackney Downs, Leabridge, Lordship, New River, Springfield, and Stoke Newington Central.

2014–2024: Following a review of ward boundaries which did not effect the parliamentary boundaries, from May 2014 the constituency comprised the following wards:

- Brownswood, Cazenove, Clissold, Dalston, Hackney Downs, Lea Bridge (most), London Fields (small part), Shacklewell, Springfield, Stamford Hill West, Stoke Newington, and Woodberry Down.

=== Current ===
Further to the 2023 review of Westminster constituencies, which came into effect for the 2024 general election, the constituency is composed of:

- The London Borough of Hackney wards of Cazenove, Clissold, Hackney Downs, King's Park, Lea Bridge, Shacklewell, Springfield, Stamford Hill West, and Stoke Newington.

Brownswood and Woodberry Down wards were transferred to Tottenham, and Dalston ward to Hackney South and Shoreditch, in exchange for the King's Park ward.

The constituency covers the northern part of the London Borough of Hackney and is bordered by the constituencies of Hackney South and Shoreditch, Islington North, Tottenham, and Walthamstow.

== Members of Parliament ==
Election	Member	Party
1950	David Weitzman	Labour
1979	Ernie Roberts	Labour
1987	Diane Abbott	Labour
2023	Diane Abbott	Independent
2024	Diane Abbott	Labour
2025	Diane Abbott	Independent
2026	Diane Abbott	Labour

== Election results ==
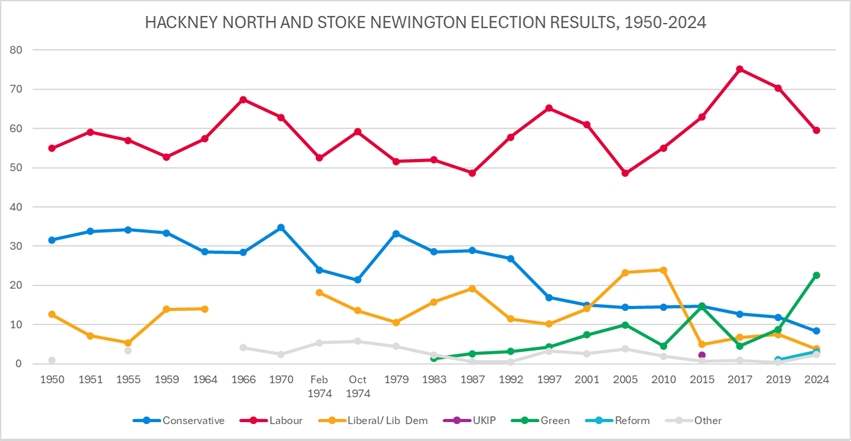
Election results 1950-2024

=== Elections in the 2020s ===
2024 general election: Hackney North and Stoke Newington
Party	Candidate	Votes	%	±%
Labour	Diane Abbott	24,355	59.5	−10.3
Green	Antoinette Fernandez	9,275	22.6	+14.6
Conservative	David Landau	3,457	8.4	−4.6
Liberal Democrats	Rebecca Jones	1,562	3.8	−3.9
Reform	Deborah Cairns	1,283	3.1	+2.1
Independent	Ryan Ahmed	621	1.5	N/A
Monster Raving Loony	Knigel Knapp	224	0.5	N/A
Independent	Kombat Diva	182	0.4	N/A
Majority		15,080	36.9	–19.9
Turnout		40,959	52.7	–15.5
Registered electors		77,797		
Labour hold		Swing	▼12.5	

=== Elections in the 2010s ===
2019 notional result
Party	Vote	%
Labour	35,856	69.8
Conservative	6,694	13.0
Green	4,117	8.0
Liberal Democrats	3,973	7.7
Brexit Party	489	1.0
Others	227	0.4
Turnout	51,356	68.1
Electorate	75,401	

2019 general election: Hackney North and Stoke Newington
Party	Candidate	Votes	%	±%
Labour	Diane Abbott	39,972	70.3	−4.8
Conservative	Benjamin Obese-Jecty	6,784	11.9	−0.8
Green	Alex Armitage	4,989	8.8	+4.2
Liberal Democrats	Ben Mathis^{1}	4,283	7.5	+0.8
Brexit Party	Richard Ings	609	1.1	New
Renew	Haseeb Ur-Rehman	151	0.3	New
Independent	Loré Lixenberg	76	0.1	New
Majority		33,188	58.4	−4.0
Turnout		56,864	61.5	−4.7
Registered electors		92,462		
Labour hold		Swing	-2.1	

^{1}: After the close of nominations, the Liberal Democrats suspended their support for Mathis's candidacy over tweets he made.

2017 general election: Hackney North and Stoke Newington
Party	Candidate	Votes	%	±%
Labour	Diane Abbott	42,265	75.1	+12.2
Conservative	Amy Gray	7,126	12.7	−2.0
Liberal Democrats	Joe Richards	3,817	6.8	+1.8
Green	Alastair Binnie-Lubbock	2,606	4.6	−10.0
Animal Welfare	Jonathan Homan	222	0.4	−0.1
Independent	Abraham Spielmann	203	0.4	New
Friends Party	Coraline Corlis-Khan	59	0.1	New
Majority		35,139	62.4	+14.2
Turnout		56,478	66.2	+9.6
Registered electors		85,058		
Labour hold		Swing	+7.2	

2015 general election: Hackney North and Stoke Newington
Party	Candidate	Votes	%	±%
Labour	Diane Abbott	31,357	62.9	+7.9
Conservative	Amy Gray	7,349	14.7	+0.2
Green	Heather Finlay	7,281	14.6	+10.0
Liberal Democrats	Simon de Deney	2,492	5.0	−18.9
UKIP	Keith Fraser	1,085	2.2	New
Animal Welfare	Jon Homan	221	0.5	New
Communist League	Jonathan Silberman	102	0.2	New
Majority		24,008	48.2	+17.1
Turnout		49,887	56.6	−6.3
Registered electors		88,153		
Labour hold		Swing	+3.9	

2010 general election: Hackney North and Stoke Newington
Party	Candidate	Votes	%	±%
Labour	Diane Abbott	25,553	55.0	+6.0
Liberal Democrats	Keith Angus	11,092	23.9	+0.8
Conservative	Darren Caplan	6,759	14.5	+0.1
Green	Matt Sellwood	2,133	4.6	−5.1
Christian	Maxine Hargreaves	299	0.6	New
Independent	Suzanne Moore	258	0.6	New
Monster Raving Loony	Knigel Knapp	182	0.4	−0.4
Independent	Paul Shaer	96	0.2	New
Independent	Alessandra Williams	61	0.1	New
Magna Carta Party	Jack Pope-de-Locksley	26	0.1	New
Majority		14,461	31.1	+5.8
Turnout		46,459	62.9	+13.5
Registered electors		73,906		
Labour hold		Swing	+2.6	

=== Elections in the 2000s ===
2005 general election: Hackney North and Stoke Newington
Party	Candidate	Votes	%	±%
Labour	Diane Abbott	14,268	48.6	−12.4
Liberal Democrats	James Blanchard	6,841	23.3	+9.2
Conservative	Ertan Hurer	4,218	14.4	−0.6
Green	Mischa Borris	2,907	9.9	+2.5
Independent	David Vail	602	2.0	New
Socialist Labour	Nusrat Sen	296	1.0	−1.6
Monster Raving Loony	Nigel Barrow	248	0.8	New
Majority		7,427	25.3	−20.7
Turnout		29,380	49.6	+0.6
Registered electors		59,274		
Labour hold		Swing	−10.8	

2001 general election: Hackney North and Stoke Newington
Party	Candidate	Votes	%	±%
Labour	Diane Abbott	18,081	61.0	−4.2
Conservative	Molly Dye	4,430	15.0	−1.9
Liberal Democrats	Meral Ece	4,170	14.1	+3.9
Green	Chit Chong	2,184	7.4	+3.1
Socialist Labour	Sukant Chandan	756	2.6	New
Majority		13,651	46.0	−2.3
Turnout		29,621	49.0	−3.0
Registered electors		60,444		
Labour hold		Swing	-1.1	

=== Elections in the 1990s ===
1997 general election: Hackney North and Stoke Newington
Party	Candidate	Votes	%	±%
Labour	Diane Abbott	21,110	65.2	+7.4
Conservative	Michael Lavender	5,483	16.9	−10.0
Liberal Democrats	Douglas Taylor	3,306	10.2	−1.3
Green	Yen Chit Chong	1,395	4.3	+1.1
Referendum	Brian Maxwell	544	1.7	New
Independent	Dickon Tolson	368	1.1	New
Rainbow Dream Ticket	Lisa Lovebucket	176	0.5	New
Majority		15,627	48.3	+17.4
Turnout		32,382	52.0	−11.5
Registered electors		62,308		
Labour hold		Swing	+8.7	

1992 general election: Hackney North and Stoke Newington
Party	Candidate	Votes	%	±%
Labour	Diane Abbott	20,083	57.8	+9.1
Conservative	Cole Manson	9,356	26.9	−2.0
Liberal Democrats	Keith Fitchett	3,996	11.5	−7.7
Green	Heather M. Hunt	1,111	3.2	+0.6
Natural Law	J Windsor	178	0.5	New
Majority		10,727	30.9	+11.1
Turnout		34,724	63.5	+5.4
Registered electors		54,655		
Labour hold		Swing	+5.6	

=== Elections in the 1980s ===
1987 general election: Hackney North and Stoke Newington
Party	Candidate	Votes	%	±%
Labour	Diane Abbott	18,912	48.7	−3.3
Conservative	Oliver Letwin	11,234	28.9	+0.3
Liberal	Simon Taylor	7,446	19.2	+3.4
Green	David FitzPatrick	997	2.6	+1.2
Red Front	Yasmini Anwar	228	0.6	New
Majority		7,678	19.8	−3.6
Turnout		38,817	58.1	+3.4
Registered electors		66,771		
Labour hold		Swing	–1.8	

1983 general election: Hackney North and Stoke Newington
Party	Candidate	Votes	%	±%
Labour	Ernie Roberts	18,989	52.0	+0.4
Conservative	Hartley Booth	10,444	28.6	−4.6
Liberal	David Ash	5,746	15.8	New
Ecology	David FitzPatrick	492	1.4	New
Communist	Monty Goldman	426	1.2	−1.3
National Front	J Field	396	1.1	−1.9
Majority		8,545	23.4	+5.1
Turnout		36,493	54.7	−6.2
Registered electors		66,754		
Labour hold		Swing	+2.5	

=== Elections in the 1970s ===
1979 general election: Hackney North and Stoke Newington
Party	Candidate	Votes	%	±%
Labour	Ernie Roberts	14,688	51.6	−7.6
Conservative	Timothy Miller	9,467	33.2	+11.81
Liberal	Tudor Gates	3,033	10.6	−3.0
National Front	Sylvia May	860	3.0	−0.74
Communist	Monty Goldman	440	1.5	0.0
Majority		5,221	18.4	−19.6
Turnout		28,488	60.9	+8.10
Registered electors		46,776		
Labour hold		Swing	–4.2	

October 1974 general election: Hackney North and Stoke Newington
Party	Candidate	Votes	%	±%
Labour	David Weitzman	16,525	59.20	+6.68
Conservative	Anthony John Wylson	5,972	21.39	−2.56
Liberal	Simon J. Lyons	3,796	13.60	−4.55
National Front	Henry Charles Lord	1,044	3.74	−0.01
Communist	Monty Goldman	418	1.50	−0.13
Workers Revolutionary	Michael Van der Poorten	159	0.57	New
Majority		10,553	37.81	+9.24
Turnout		27,914	52.80	−9.33
Registered electors		52,870		
Labour hold		Swing	+4.6	

February 1974 general election: Hackney North and Stoke Newington
Party	Candidate	Votes	%	±%
Labour	David Weitzman	17,160	52.52	−10.32
Conservative	Anthony John Wylson	7,826	23.95	−10.75
Liberal	Simon J. Lyons	5,932	18.15	New
National Front	Henry Charles Lord	1,226	3.75	New
Communist	Monty Goldman	532	1.63	−0.81
Majority		9,334	28.57	+0.45
Turnout		32,676	62.13	+12.06
Registered electors		52,595		
Labour hold		Swing	+0.3	

1970 general election: Hackney North and Stoke Newington
Party	Candidate	Votes	%	±%
Labour	David Weitzman	20,446	62.84	−4.57
Conservative	John R. Boast	11,298	34.72	+6.28
Communist	Monty Goldman	793	2.44	−1.71
Majority		9,148	28.12	−10.85
Turnout		32,537	50.07	−5.74
Registered electors		64,980		
Labour hold		Swing	-5.4	

=== Elections in the 1960s ===
1966 general election: Hackney North and Stoke Newington
Party	Candidate	Votes	%	±%
Labour	David Weitzman	24,221	67.41	+10.02
Conservative	John R. Boast	10,221	28.44	−0.14
Communist	Monty Goldman	1,491	4.15	New
Majority		14,000	38.97	+10.16
Turnout		35,933	55.81	−2.39
Registered electors		64,389		
Labour hold		Swing	+5.1	

1964 general election: Hackney North and Stoke Newington
Party	Candidate	Votes	%	±%
Labour	David Weitzman	21,777	57.39	+4.78
Conservative	Roger White	10,843	28.58	−4.76
Liberal	Jack Bright	5,324	14.03	+0.08
Majority		10,934	28.81	+9.44
Turnout		37,944	58.20	−9.52
Registered electors		65,191		
Labour hold		Swing	+4.8	

=== Elections in the 1950s ===
1959 general election: Hackney North and Stoke Newington
Party	Candidate	Votes	%	±%
Labour	David Weitzman	22,950	52.71	−4.25
Conservative	Roger White	14,515	33.34	−0.87
Liberal	Philip Phillips	6,076	13.95	+8.56
Majority		8,435	19.37	−3.38
Turnout		43,541	67.72	−0.19
Registered electors		64,723		
Labour hold		Swing	–1.7	

1955 general election: Hackney North and Stoke Newington
Party	Candidate	Votes	%	±%
Labour	David Weitzman	25,253	56.96	−2.13
Conservative	Leonard Defries-Porter	15,165	34.21	+0.45
Liberal	Benjamin Ashkenazi	2,388	5.39	−1.76
Communist	Aubrey Morris	1,525	3.44	New
Majority		10,088	22.75	−2.59
Turnout		44,331	67.91	−11.0
Registered electors		65,281		
Labour hold		Swing	–1.3	

1951 general election: Hackney North and Stoke Newington
Party	Candidate	Votes	%	±%
Labour	David Weitzman	37,406	59.09	+4.19
Conservative	Trevor Skeet	21,369	33.76	+2.16
Liberal	Joan Allison	4,524	7.15	−5.45
Majority		16,037	25.34	+2.04
Turnout		63,299	78.91	+0.23
Registered electors		80,221		
Labour hold		Swing	+1.0	

1950 general election: Hackney North and Stoke Newington
Party	Candidate	Votes	%	±%
Labour	David Weitzman	33,783	54.9	
Conservative	William H. Bishop	19,469	31.6	
Liberal	Philip Phillips	7,740	12.6	
Social Credit	John Hargrave	551	0.9	
Majority		14,314	23.3	
Turnout		61,453	78.68	
Registered electors		78,218		
Labour win (new seat)				

== See also ==
- List of parliamentary constituencies in Hackney
- Parliamentary constituencies in London
