= 1932 Wednesbury by-election =

UK parliamentary by-election

← 1931	26 July 1932	1935 →
- Registered: 51,498
- Turnout: 78.0% (▼11.0%)
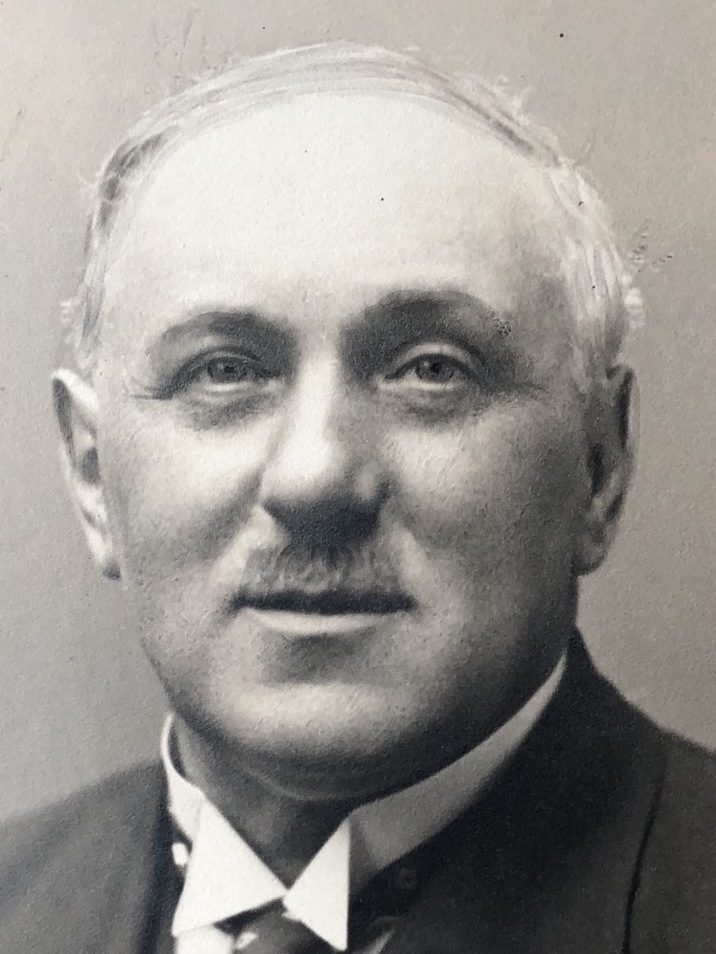
	First party	Second party
		Con
Candidate	William Banfield	Rex Davis
Party	Labour	Conservative
Popular vote	21,977	18,198
Percentage	54.7%	45.3%
Swing	▲9.2%	▼9.2%
MP before election
William Ward
Conservative
Subsequent MP
William Banfield
Labour

The 1932 Wednesbury by-election was a by-election held on 26 July 1932 for the British House of Commons constituency of Wednesbury in Staffordshire. The by-election was triggered by the elevation to the peerage of the sitting Conservative Member of Parliament (MP) Viscount Ednam.

The seat had been held by Labour since 1918, but had fallen to the Conservatives with a majority of over 4,000 as part of the 1931 election landslide less than a year earlier. The election was dominated by the continuing effects of the Great Depression. Labour, whose candidate was William Banfield, General Secretary of the Amalgamated Union of Operative Bakers and Confectioners, fought on the issue of the means test for unemployment benefit. The Conservative candidate was Captain Rex G. Davis, whose election address focused on the economy, employment and the Empire.

The Labour Party had every reason to hope to regain the seat, normally a safe one for the party. 'There will be acute surprise and disappointment if Mr Banfield is not elected,' according to a report in The Times, which pointed out that the constituency had 12,000 unemployed and several factories had closed down. The newspaper felt that Davis had the better of the argument, but the contest 'had resolved itself into a fight between the Socialist and Conservative machines'.

The result was a victory for Labour, as expected, with a majority of well over 3,000. Captain Davis accused the party of misrepresenting the facts about the means test and complained that in the three weeks of the campaign he 'had not had the time to dispel the fears created in the minds of the local unemployed'. The seat continued in Labour hands until its abolition in 1974.

== Result ==
Wednesbury by-election, 1932 Electorate 51,498
Party	Candidate	Votes	%	±%
Labour	William Banfield	21,977	54.7	+9.2
Conservative	Rex Davis	18,198	45.3	−9.2
Majority		3,779	9.4	N/A
Turnout		40,175	78.0	−11.0
Labour gain from Conservative		Swing	+9.2	

== See also ==
- List of United Kingdom by-elections
- Wednesbury constituency
