= Frank Banfield =

British politician (1905–1970)

Frank Walter Banfield (14 August 1905 – 31 March 1970) was a British politician, who served on the London County Council and Greater London Council.

The youngest son of William Banfield, Frank followed him into the Labour Party and local politics in Fulham. He served on Fulham Metropolitan Borough Council for 26 years, and was Mayor of Fulham in 1952/53. He was elected in the 1946 London County Council election, representing Fulham West, and was vice chair of the council in 1953/54. He also served as chair of the council's river, drainage and sewerage committee, a role in which he began investigating the possibility of a Thames Barrier.

In 1955, the London County Council constituencies were reorganised, and Banfield moved to represent Barons Court, remaining there until the council was abolished in 1965. He became an alderman on its replacement, the Greater London Council, and contested Hammersmith at the 1970 Greater London Council election. He died suddenly, aged 64, during the election campaign, causing the election in the seat to be postponed. He was survived by his widow, Dorothy (née Clare) Banfield. In 1975, Frank Banfield Park was named for him.

Civic offices
Preceded by Percy Edward Fenne	Mayor of Fulham; 1952–1953	Succeeded by William George Wallis
