= George Jones (British politician) =

British barrister and politician

Jones in 1922

Sir George William Henry Jones (1874 – 3 January 1956) was a British barrister and Conservative politician.

Jones spent his early years in business before deciding to study law in his thirties, and was called to the bar at Gray's Inn in 1907. He continued a successful legal practice until his retirement due to deafness in 1949. He famously defended the populist Member of Parliament (MP) Horatio Bottomley against fraud charges.

In 1910 he entered local politics, when he was elected as a Municipal Reform Party member of the London County Council, representing Hackney North. He remained a member of the council until 1919.

In the same year that he entered local government he made his first attempt to gain election to the Commons. He stood as Conservative candidate in the general election held in December, contesting the constituency of Leeds West. The seat was a safe Liberal one, and Jones failed to be elected.

At the next general election held in 1918, he was elected as Conservative MP for Stoke Newington. He held the seat almost continuously until 1945, being briefly unseated from 1923 to 1924. He was knighted in 1928.

Sir George Jones was unmarried, and died in a London nursing home in January 1956 aged 81.

Parliament of the United Kingdom
New constituency	Member of Parliament for Stoke Newington; 1918–1923	Succeeded by Ernest Spero
Preceded by Ernest Spero	Member of Parliament for Stoke Newington; 1924–1945	Succeeded by David Weitzman
