= Islington Workhouse =

Workhouse in London, England

Coordinates: 51.5644°N 0.1243°W

The Islington Workhouse was constructed by the West London Union in 1864–5 in Upper Holloway.
