= David Weitzman =

British politician

David Weitzman, QC (18 June 1898 – 6 May 1987) was a British Labour Party politician.

Weitzman was born in Blackburn and educated at Hutchesons' Grammar School, Glasgow, Manchester Central School and Manchester University. He served in the Manchester Regiment in the First World War. After graduating he was called to the Bar (Gray's Inn) and became a member of the Northern Circuit. He contested Stoke Newington unsuccessfully at the 1935 general election but it was a Labour gain at the 1945 general election.

In October 1947, he was convicted of conspiracy related to unlawful supply of toilet preparations (lipstick) by his brothers' Newington Supply Co., between June 1940 and January 1946, contrary to wartime regulations, and was sentenced to 12 months imprisonment and fined £500. This was quashed in March 1948.

For the 1950 election his seat was reconstituted as Hackney North and Stoke Newington and he went on to represent the constituency for a further 29 years.

For the five years leading up to his retirement in 1979, he was the last sitting British MP born in the 19th century, the last born during the Victorian era, the oldest member of the House of Commons, and the last Member of Parliament to have served in the First World War. After his retirement, Bob Edwards became the oldest sitting British MP.

He was married three times and had a son and a daughter from the first marriage. He died on 6 May 1987 aged 88.

Parliament of the United Kingdom
Preceded by Sir George Jones	Member of Parliament for Stoke Newington; 1945–1950	Constituency abolished
New constituency	Member of Parliament for Hackney North and Stoke Newington; 1950–1979	Succeeded by Ernie Roberts
Honorary titles
Preceded by Dame Irene Ward	Oldest sitting Member of Parliament; 1974–1979	Succeeded by Bob Edwards
