= Bill Fiske, Baron Fiske =

British politician (1905–1975)

The Right Honourable The Lord Fiske CBE

1st Leader of the Greater London Council
- In office April 1964 – April 1967
- Preceded by: Office established
- Succeeded by: Desmond Plummer

Member of the House of Lords Lord Temporal
- In office 18 September 1967 – 13 January 1975; Life Peerage

Personal details
- Born: 3 July 1905
- Died: 13 January 1975 (aged 69)
- Party: Labour

William Geoffrey Fiske, Baron Fiske, CBE (3 July 1905 – 13 January 1975) was a British politician who was the first Leader of the Greater London Council and oversaw the decimalisation of the pound sterling as Chairman of the Decimal Currency Board.

== Early life ==
Fiske came from a middle-class family with radical sympathies who often discussed politics, with his maternal grandfather being a particularly strong influence. In his early life, Fiske's main interest was in the art of ancient Greece. He was sent to Berkhamsted Collegiate School, and upon leaving, went to work for the Bank of England. After twelve years at the Bank, he took advantage of its generous pension scheme and left in 1935, and began to work as a Company Secretary.

== Career ==
When World War II broke out, Fiske was drafted as a specialist into the Civil Service where he founded the Society of Civil Servants. The war helped to energise him in politics generally and he unsuccessfully fought the constituency of Hornsey for the Labour Party in the general election of 1945.

The next year saw Fiske elected to the London County Council for Hammersmith South, a seat previously held by the Conservatives. He lost his seat at the next LCC election in 1949, but remained a member when he was chosen as an alderman for a six-year term. He gradually became so enthusiastic about council work that, by 1955, it had eclipsed his previous ambitions to be elected to Parliament. (On becoming Leader of the GLC, he observed that "Here you see far more of the results of what you do than you can across the river.") In the 1956 New Year Honours, he was appointed a Commander of the Order of the British Empire (CBE). In 1955, he was elected as a councillor for the new seat of Barons Court, holding it until 1965.

Fiske became popular among his colleagues in the Labour Group, and in 1960, was elected as Chief Whip, deposing Freda Corbet who had held the job for 12 years and was a close ally of the Labour leader Isaac Hayward. He was less popular among individual members of the Labour Party, and when the LCC was abolished, he was selected as a candidate for the new Greater London Council in Havering, which was marginal. He was however selected as the Leader of the Labour Group for the GLC elections.

He fought the 1964 elections on traditional lines, campaigning on the record of the LCC in building new council housing which was regarded as good quality at the time. Despite predictions that the wider boundaries of the GLC would hand power to the Conservatives, Fiske topped the poll in his own three-seat constituency and Labour won a comfortable victory. When Labour won the general election later that year, Fiske was given a knighthood.

In power, Fiske's administration treated the GLC as a version of the LCC with wider boundaries, which ignored the increased power of the new London Boroughs. Attempts to press GLC policy on unwilling boroughs were made but could now be resisted. The GLC also had to cope with increasing road transport problems because of the increase in the number of cars. Fiske proposed to increase charges for parking in inner London, with residents' parking permits required for those living in the zone, stating that he hoped more people would leave their car and use public transport. The scheme proved unpopular among car drivers.

Fiske carried out a policy of subsidies for the arts, and it was under his leadership that the decision was made to build the Royal National Theatre on the South Bank site. He, himself, served as a member of the board. However, he was unable to hold council house rents down as far as he wished.

The 1967 elections took place when the Labour Government of Harold Wilson had become unpopular and it was accepted that Fiske would find it difficult to hold on. However, the result was shattering. Labour was heavily defeated, reduced to only 20 members. Fiske himself was pushed into fourth place in his own constituency as the Tories took all three seats in Havering. Fiske accepted immediately that his career in local politics was over. On 18 September 1967 he received a life peerage with the title Baron Fiske, of Brent in Greater London as a consolation.

He had already been handed a lifeline by Chancellor of the Exchequer James Callaghan who, thinking of his Bank of England experience, appointed him Chairman of the Decimal Currency Board on 12 December 1966. Fiske was charged with arranging the changeover from a Pound consisting of 20 shillings, with each shilling containing 12 pence, to a decimalised Pound of 100 new pence.

Fiske led an ambitious public campaign in the years leading up to the switch, trying to make sure every business and every consumer was aware of the implications. Public information films were made and shown on television and leaflets were distributed by the Government. The date for the switch, which became known as 'Decimal Day' or 'D day', was set for Monday 15 February 1971 but the new decimal coins (some of which were the same value as existing pre-decimal coinage) were introduced gradually.

In the event, despite some predictions of disaster, D day went off smoothly, with the main concerns being over retailers using the opportunity to round prices up and thereby boost inflation. The Decimal Currency Board was wound up at the end of 1971, and Fiske then went into retirement. He used his seat in the Lords to campaign in support of council tenants, statutory control of estate agents, and for better treatment of diabetes.

Political offices
Preceded by New creation	Leader of the Greater London Council; 1964–1967	Succeeded by Sir Desmond Plummer
