= Fulham West =

Parliamentary constituency in the United Kingdom, 1918–1955

- Former borough constituency for the House of Commons

1918–1955
- Seats: one
- Created from: Fulham
- Replaced by: Fulham

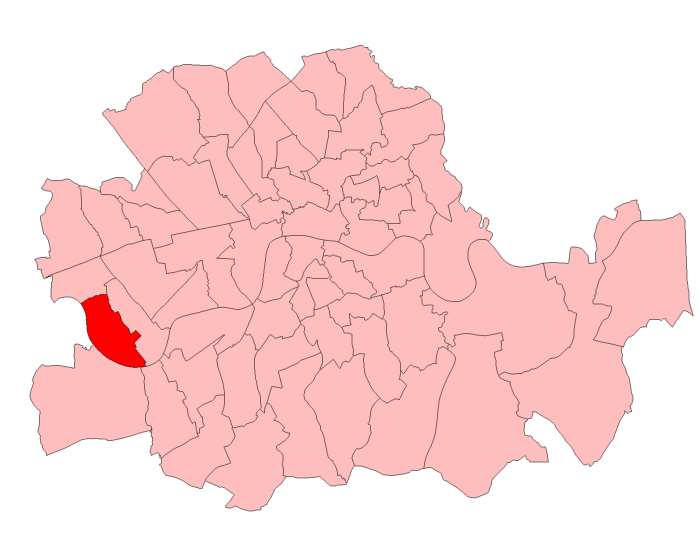
Fulham West in the County of London, boundaries 1918-50

A map showing the wards of Fulham Metropolitan Borough as they appeared in 1916.

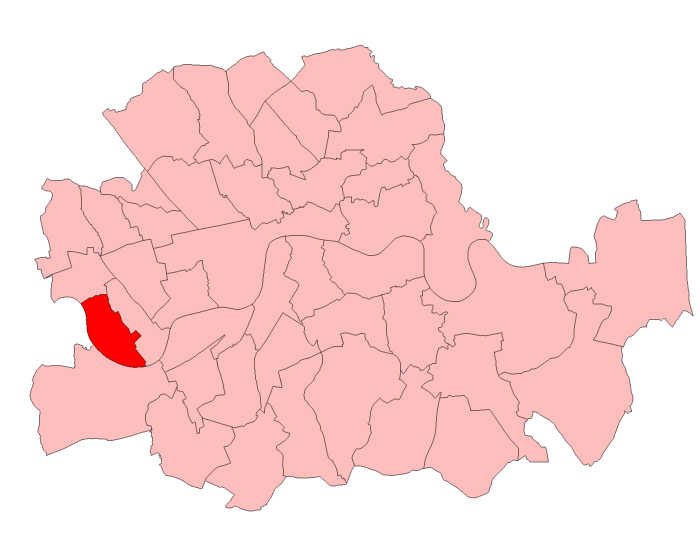
Fulham West in the County of London, boundaries 1950-55

Fulham West was a borough constituency based in the London district of Fulham. It was represented in the House of Commons of the Parliament of the United Kingdom from 1918 to 1955.

At the 1918 general election the previous Fulham constituency was divided into two constituencies, Fulham East and Fulham West; the two halves were re-united for the 1955 general election. At the 1997 general election, the Fulham constituency was replaced by Hammersmith and Fulham.

== Boundaries ==
The Metropolitan Borough of Fulham wards of Hurlingham, Margravine, Munster, and Town.

== Members of Parliament ==
Election	Member	Party
1918	Sir Cyril Cobb	Unionist
1929	Ernest Spero	Labour
1930	Sir Cyril Cobb	Conservative
1938	Edith Summerskill	Labour
1955	constituency abolished	

== Elections ==
=== Elections in the 1910s ===
General election 1918: Fulham West
Party		Candidate	Votes	%	±%
C	Unionist	Cyril Cobb	12,182	64.9	
	Labour	Robert Mark Gentry	4,435	23.7	
	Liberal	Herbert Fordham	1,139	6.1	
	NFDDSS	William Jones Allen	995	5.3	
Majority			7,747	41.2	
Turnout			18,751	46.9	
	Unionist win (new seat)				
C indicates candidate endorsed by the coalition government.

=== Elections in the 1920s ===
General election 1922: Fulham West
Party	Candidate	Votes	%	±%
Unionist	Cyril Cobb	14,875	64.4	−0.5
Labour	Robert Mark Gentry	8,210	35.6	+11.9
Majority		6,665	28.8	−12.4
Turnout		23,085	58.4	+11.5
Unionist hold		Swing	-6.2	

General election 1923: Fulham West
Party	Candidate	Votes	%	±%
Unionist	Cyril Cobb	9,965	39.5	−24.9
Labour	Robert Mark Gentry	8,687	34.4	−1.2
Liberal	Christopher W Courtenay	6,604	26.1	New
Majority		1,278	5.1	−23.7
Turnout		25,256	62.9	+4.5
Unionist hold		Swing	-11.8	

General election 1924: Fulham West
Party	Candidate	Votes	%	±%
Unionist	Cyril Cobb	17,109	59.4	+19.9
Labour	Robert Mark Gentry	11,706	40.6	+1.2
Majority		5,403	18.8	+13.7
Turnout		28,215	71.3	+8.4
Unionist hold		Swing	+9.3	

Spero

General election 1929: Fulham West
Party	Candidate	Votes	%	±%
Labour	Ernest Spero	16,190	44.9	+4.3
Unionist	Cyril Cobb	13,979	38.7	−20.7
Liberal	George Arthur Gale	5,920	16.4	New
Majority		2,211	6.2	−12.6
Turnout		36,089	71.4	+0.1
Labour gain from Unionist		Swing	+12.5	

=== Elections in the 1930s ===
1930 Fulham West by-election
Party	Candidate	Votes	%	±%
Conservative	Cyril Cobb	16,223	50.4	+11.7
Labour	John Banfield	15,983	49.6	+4.7
Majority		240	0.8	N/A
Turnout		32,206	63.6	−7.8
Conservative gain from Labour		Swing	+3.5	

General election 1931: Fulham West
Party	Candidate	Votes	%	±%
Conservative	Cyril Cobb	24,257	66.6	+16.2
Labour	John Banfield	12,164	33.4	−16.2
Majority		12,093	33.2	+32.4
Turnout		36,421	71.4	+7.8
Conservative hold		Swing	+16.2	

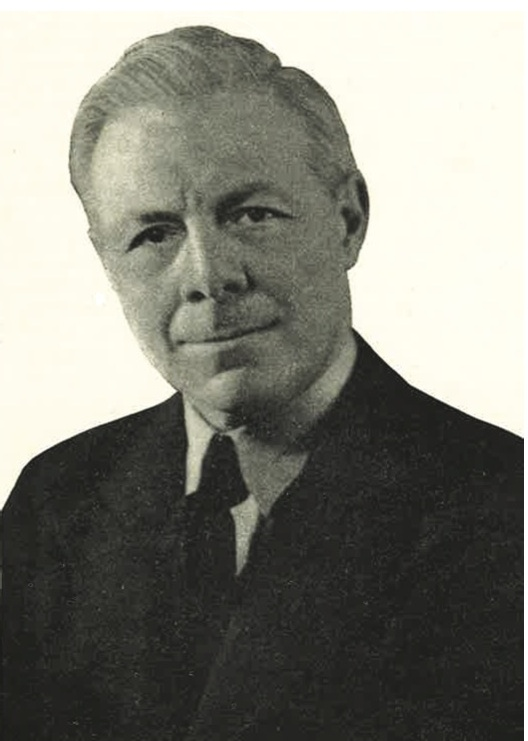
Follick

General election 1935: Fulham West
Party	Candidate	Votes	%	±%
Conservative	Cyril Cobb	18,461	53.4	−13.2
Labour	Mont Follick	14,978	43.3	+9.9
Liberal	Ebenezer Josiah Johnson	1,132	3.3	New
Majority		3,483	10.1	−23.1
Turnout		34,571	69.9	−1.5
Conservative hold		Swing	-11.6	

1938 Fulham West by-election
Party	Candidate	Votes	%	±%
Labour	Edith Summerskill	16,583	52.2	+8.9
Conservative	Charles John Busby	15,162	47.8	−5.6
Majority		1,421	4.4	N/A
Turnout		31,745	66.5	−3.4
Labour gain from Conservative		Swing	+7.3	

General Election 1939–40

Another General Election was required to take place before the end of 1940. The political parties had been making preparations for an election to take place and by the Autumn of 1939, the following candidates had been selected;

- Labour: Edith Summerskill
- Conservative:
- British Union: Mercedes Barrington

=== Elections in the 1940s ===
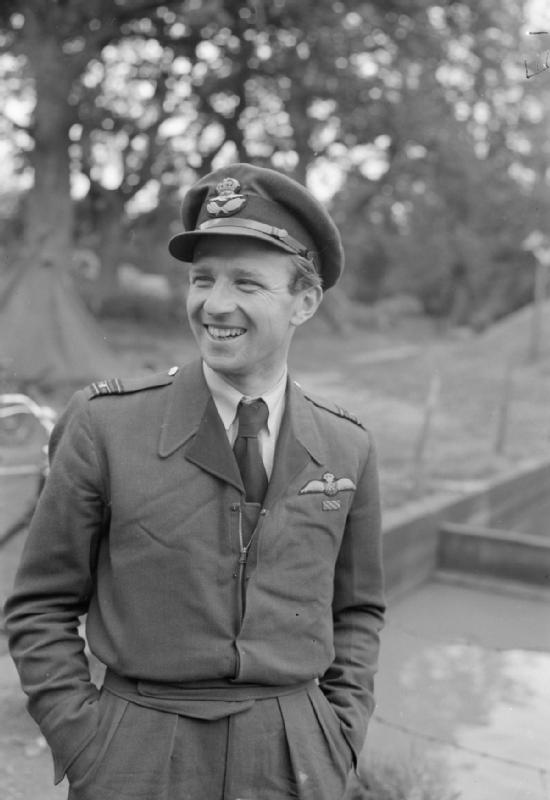
Lucas

General election 1945: Fulham West
Party	Candidate	Votes	%	±%
Labour	Edith Summerskill	19,537	61.9	+18.6
Conservative	Laddie Lucas	12,016	38.1	−15.3
Majority		7,521	23.8	+13.7
Turnout		31,553	76.3	+6.4
Labour hold		Swing	+9.7	

=== Elections in the 1950s ===
General election 1950: Fulham West
Party	Candidate	Votes	%	±%
Labour	Edith Summerskill	20,141	51.1	−10.8
Conservative	William O'Donovan	17,292	43.9	+5.8
Liberal	Eric Walcot-Bather	1,949	5.0	New
Majority		2,849	7.2	−16.6
Turnout		37,433	86.2	+9.9
Labour hold		Swing	-8.3	

General election 1951: Fulham West
Party	Candidate	Votes	%	±%
Labour	Edith Summerskill	20,290	51.7	+0.6
Independent	William Brown	17,707	45.1	New
Liberal	Eric Walcot-Bather	1,247	3.2	−1.8
Majority		2,583	6.6	−0.6
Turnout		37,997	86.6	+0.4
Labour hold		Swing		
