= Hammersmith South (London County Council constituency) =

London County Council constituency

- Former constituency for the London County Council

Former constituency
- Created: 1919
- Abolished: 1955
- Member(s): 2 (to 1949); 3 (from 1949)
- Created from: Hammersmith
- Replaced by: Barons Court and Hammersmith North

Hammersmith South was a constituency used for elections to the London County Council between 1919 and 1955. The seat shared boundaries with the UK Parliament constituency of the same name. Part was moved into Hammersmith North, and the remainder became part of a new Barons Court constituency.

== Councillors ==
Year	Name	Party	Name	Party	Name	Party
1919	Francis Robert Ince Anderton	Municipal Reform	Isidore Salmon	Municipal Reform	Two seats until 1949	
1925	John Crawford Platt	Municipal Reform	Bertie Jonathan Samuels	Municipal Reform	Two seats until 1949	
1931	Walter Clifford Northcott	Municipal Reform	Bertie Jonathan Samuels	Municipal Reform	Two seats until 1949	
1946	Vera Dart	Labour	Bill Fiske	Labour	Two seats until 1949	
1949	Anthony Dalmain	Conservative	John Howard	Conservative	Leslie Frank Ramseyer	Conservative
1952	Ena Daniels	Labour	Audrey Lees	Labour	Fred Tonge	Labour

== Election results ==
1919 London County Council election: Hammersmith South
Party	Candidate	Votes	%	±%
Municipal Reform	Francis Robert Ince Anderton	2,168	40.4	
Municipal Reform	Isidore Salmon	2,109	39.3	
Labour	Dora Montefiore	1,093	20.4	
Majority		1,016	18.9	
Municipal Reform hold		Swing		
Municipal Reform hold		Swing		

1922 London County Council election: Hammersmith South
Party	Candidate	Votes	%	±%
Municipal Reform	Francis Robert Ince Anderton	6,483	36.4	−4.0
Municipal Reform	Isidore Salmon	6,415	36.1	−3.2
Labour	C. J. Atkinson	2,574	14.5	−4.4
Labour	M. Price	2,305	13.0	n/a
Majority		3,841	21.6	+2.7
Municipal Reform hold		Swing		
Municipal Reform hold		Swing		

1925 London County Council election: Hammersmith South
Party	Candidate	Votes	%	±%
Municipal Reform	John Crawford Platt	4,924		
Municipal Reform	Bertie Jonathan Samuels	4,819		
Labour	F. C. R. Douglas	2,630		
Labour	Barbara Drake	2,613		
Majority				
Municipal Reform hold		Swing		
Municipal Reform hold		Swing		

1928 London County Council election: Hammersmith South
Party	Candidate	Votes	%	±%
Municipal Reform	John Crawford Platt	5,176		
Municipal Reform	Bertie Jonathan Samuels	5,172		
Labour	Stanley James Wells Morgan	3,769		
Labour	Herman Finer	3,759		
Majority				
Municipal Reform hold		Swing		
Municipal Reform hold		Swing		

1931 London County Council election: Hammersmith South
Party	Candidate	Votes	%	±%
Municipal Reform	Bertie Jonathan Samuels	5,186		
Municipal Reform	Walter Clifford Northcott	5,128		
Labour	Wyndham Albery	3,007		
Labour	P. W. J. Kingdom	2,915		
Majority				
Municipal Reform hold		Swing		
Municipal Reform hold		Swing		

1934 London County Council election: Hammersmith South
Party	Candidate	Votes	%	±%
Municipal Reform	Bertie Jonathan Samuels	5,403		
Municipal Reform	Walter Clifford Northcott	5,279		
Labour	T. Morris	3,839		
Labour	H. J. Yarham	3,734		
Majority				
Municipal Reform hold		Swing		
Municipal Reform hold		Swing		

1937 London County Council election: Hammersmith South
Party	Candidate	Votes	%	±%
Municipal Reform	Bertie Jonathan Samuels	6,753		
Municipal Reform	Walter Clifford Northcott	6,695		
Labour	N. F. Bartlett	5,527		
Labour	W. W. Miller	5,436		
Majority				
Municipal Reform hold		Swing		
Municipal Reform hold		Swing		

1946 London County Council election: Hammersmith South
Party	Candidate	Votes	%	±%
Labour	Bill Fiske	5,539		
Labour	Vera Dart	5,485		
Conservative	Isidore Salmon	5,001		
Conservative	Furse	4,923		
Majority				
Labour gain from Municipal Reform		Swing		
Labour gain from Municipal Reform		Swing		

1949 London County Council election: Hammersmith South
Party	Candidate	Votes	%	±%
Conservative	John Howard	9,859		
Conservative	Leslie Frank Ramseyer	9,850		
Conservative	Anthony Dalmain	9,238		
Labour	Vera Dart	8,609		
Labour	Bill Fiske	8,552		
Labour	H. Solomons	8,527		
Conservative win (new seat)				
Conservative gain from Labour		Swing		
Conservative gain from Labour		Swing		

1952 London County Council election: Hammersmith South
Party	Candidate	Votes	%	±%
Labour	Ena Daniels	12,790		
Labour	Fred Tonge	12,398		
Labour	Audrey Lees	12,380		
Conservative	J. M. Chambon	9,485		
Conservative	John Howard	9,439		
Conservative	P. T. R. Acton	9,433		
Labour gain from Conservative		Swing		
Labour gain from Conservative		Swing		
Labour gain from Conservative		Swing		
