= Stoke Newington (UK Parliament constituency) =

Parliamentary constituency in the United Kingdom, 1918–1950

- Former borough constituency for the House of Commons
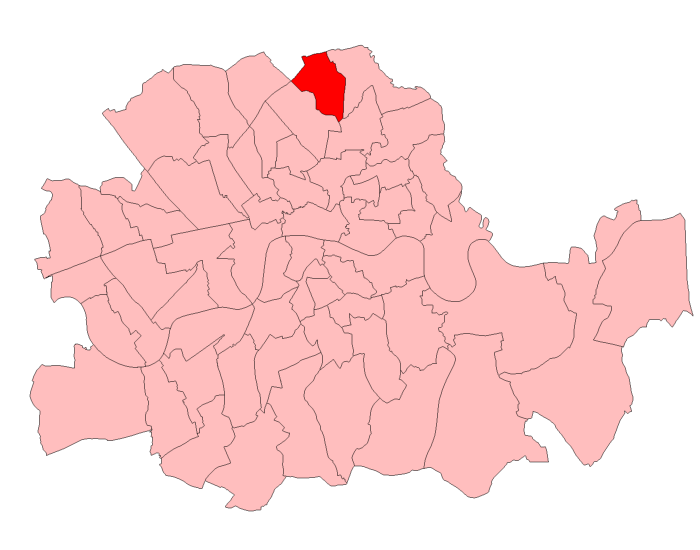

1918–1950
- Seats: one
- Created from: Hackney North
- Replaced by: Stoke Newington and Hackney North

Stoke Newington was a borough constituency in the parliamentary county of London from 1918 – 1950. It returned one Member of Parliament (MP) to the House of Commons of the Parliament of the United Kingdom.

== Boundaries ==
The constituency was identical in area to the Metropolitan Borough of Stoke Newington.

== History ==
The seat was created under the Representation of the People Act 1918 for the 1918 general election, and abolished under the Representation of the People Act 1948 for the 1950 general election, and largely replaced by the newly created Hackney North & Stoke Newington constituency.

== Members of Parliament ==
Election	Member	Party
1918	George Jones	Conservative
1923	Ernest Spero	Liberal
1924	George Jones (knighted in 1928)	Conservative
1945	David Weitzman	Labour
1950	constituency abolished: see Hackney North & Stoke Newington	

== Elections ==
=== Elections in the 1910s ===
General election 1918: Stoke Newington Electorate 20,090
Party	Candidate	Votes	%	±%
Unionist	*George Jones	5,918	54.1	
Independent	H J Ormond	2,829	25.9	
Liberal	Percy Holt Heffer	2,181	20.0	
Majority		3,089	28.2	
Turnout		10,928	54.4	
Unionist win (new seat)				

- denotes candidate who was endorsed by the Coalition Government.

=== Elections in the 1920s ===
Jones

General election 1922: Stoke Newington
Party	Candidate	Votes	%	±%
Unionist	George Jones	9,753	63.0	+8.9
Liberal	Percy Holt Heffer	5,737	37.0	+17.0
Majority		4,016	26.0	−2.2
Turnout		15,490	65.0	+10.6
Unionist hold		Swing	-4.0	

Ernest Spero

General election 1923: Stoke Newington
Party	Candidate	Votes	%	±%
Liberal	Ernest Spero	8,365	53.5	+16.5
Unionist	George Jones	7,264	46.5	−16.5
Majority		1,101	7.0	N/A
Turnout		15,629	63.5	−1.5
Liberal gain from Unionist		Swing	+16.5	

General election 1924: Stoke Newington
Party	Candidate	Votes	%	±%
Unionist	George Jones	10,688	56.7	+10.2
Liberal	Ernest Spero	4,758	25.2	−28.3
Labour	Lewis Silkin	3,420	18.1	New
Majority		5,930	31.5	N/A
Turnout		18,866	78.0	+14.5
Unionist gain from Liberal		Swing		

General election 1929: Stoke Newington
Party	Candidate	Votes	%	±%
Unionist	George Jones	9,030	38.0	−18.7
Liberal	Frederick William Norwood	7,958	33.6	+8.4
Labour	F. L. Kerran	6,723	28.4	+10.3
Majority		1,072	4.4	−27.1
Turnout		23,711	70.0	−8.0
Unionist hold		Swing	-13.1	

=== Elections in the 1930s ===
General election 1931: Stoke Newington
Party	Candidate	Votes	%	±%
Conservative	George Jones	16,035	73.3	+35.3
Labour	F. L. Kerran	5,837	26.7	−1.7
Majority		10,198	46.6	+42.2
Turnout		21,872	63.2	−6.8
Conservative hold		Swing		

General election 1935: Stoke Newington
Party	Candidate	Votes	%	±%
Conservative	George Jones	11,213	53.3	−20.0
Labour	David Weitzman	7,448	35.4	+8.7
Liberal	John Howard Whitehouse	2,364	11.2	New
Majority		3,765	17.9	−28.7
Turnout		21,025	61.5	−1.7
Conservative hold		Swing		

=== Elections in the 1940s ===
General Election 1939–40: Another General Election was required to take place before the end of 1940. The political parties had been making preparations for an election to take place from 1939 and by the end of this year, the following candidates had been selected;

- Conservative: George Jones
- Labour: David Weitzman
- Liberal: Harold Gordon
- British Union: Edward Whinfield

General election 1945: Stoke Newington Electorate 26,987
Party	Candidate	Votes	%	±%
Labour	David Weitzman	9,356	51.5	+16.1
Conservative	George Jones	5,155	28.4	−24.9
Liberal	Hubert Herbert Creemer Blake	3,651	20.1	+8.9
Majority		4,201	23.1	N/A
Turnout		18,162	67.3	+5.8
Labour gain from Conservative		Swing		
