= George Spero (politician) =

British physician, writer, businessman and politician

Member of Parliament for Fulham West
- In office 30 May 1929 – 9 April 1930
- Preceded by: Sir Cyril Cobb
- Succeeded by: Sir Cyril Cobb

Member of Parliament for Stoke Newington
- In office 6 December 1923 – 9 October 1924
- Preceded by: George Jones
- Succeeded by: George Jones

(George) Ernest Spero, later Spears, (2 March 1894 – 7 January 1960 or June 1976) was a British physician, writer, journalist, businessman and politician. He served as a Liberal MP in 1923–24, and a Labour MP from 1929–30, when he resigned his seat ahead of a court case and bankruptcy proceedings. He left the country for the United States, where he changed his name and became a naturalised citizen, practising as an ophthalmologist.

Spero was born in 1894 in Dover to Isidore Spero, a Jewish immigrant from Russia, and his wife Rachel. Isidore was a dentist, and George, along with his brothers Samuel and Leopold, trained in medicine. He studied at the London Hospital and Royal Dental Hospital from October 1912, joining the Royal Navy as a surgeon following the outbreak of the First World War, subsequently travelling around the world twice.

Following the war, Spero returned to medicine and became active in politics. He contested the seat of Leicester West for the Liberal Party at the 1922 general election but failed to be elected. The same year, he married Rina Ansley, the daughter of a wealthy London stockbroker; the couple had two daughters, born in 1923 and 1928.

In 1923 he was selected as the party's candidate to contest Stoke Newington at the general election. The sitting Conservative MP, George Jones, was seen as being safe. Spero, who was also supported by local Labour activists, ran a campaign seeking the votes of ex-servicemen, with the slogan "We were comrades during the war. Let us be pals in peace". He was successful, unexpectedly unseating the "impregnable" incumbent member. A further general election was held in the following year and the situation was reversed: Jones regained the seat, which he was to hold until 1945.

In 1925 he joined the Labour Party. At the 1929 general election he was the party's candidate for the Fulham West constituency, and won the seat in a three-cornered contest against Conservative and Liberal opponents.

On 9 April 1930 he informed his local Labour party that he was resigning from parliament through appointment as Steward of the Chiltern Hundreds, citing ill health.

In May 1930 the reason for his resignation became clear when judgement was given against him in the High Court. Spero had owned a radio set manufacturing business which he had sold in February 1929. The business had been in debt, which he had given a personal guarantee to clear. He did this by issuing unauthorised company cheques to cover the amount which were not honoured. Spero did not attend the case, and evidence was given that he had in fact fled to the United States in January 1930. The court found that Spero was liable to pay over £10,000 to the plaintiffs. In June of the same year a bankruptcy petition was lodged against him. Spero again failed to appear in court, and he was declared bankrupt on 6 August, with his estate placed in the hands of a trustee.

Spero and his family moved to New York City and then to Beverly Hills, California, where he became a naturalised American citizen in 1938; as part of the process, he changed his surname to Spears. They later returned to New York, where he practiced as an ophthalmologist. He died in Riverside County, California on 7 January 1960, although alternative research suggests he may have died in Belgrade, Yugoslavia in June 1976

Parliament of the United Kingdom
Preceded by George Jones	Member of Parliament for Stoke Newington; 1923–1924	Succeeded by George Jones
Preceded by Sir Cyril Cobb	Member of Parliament for Fulham West; 1929–1930	Succeeded by Sir Cyril Cobb
