= James Beal (reformer) =

British radical

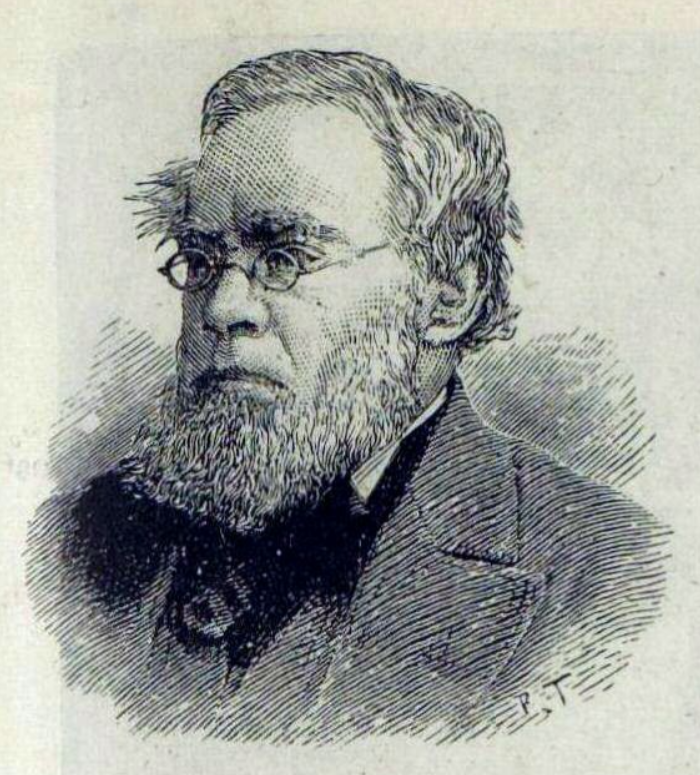
- Born: 1829
- Died: 11 June 1891; Hammersmith
- Occupation: Reformer

James Beal (1829–1891) was an English land agent and auctioneer, known as a London reformer. Over many years he was a prominent radical.

== Personal life ==
Beal was born in Chelsea, London, and worked as an auctioneer and land agent. His father was a tradesman, with a Yorkshire background. He initially worked as a solicitor's clerk, and then for an upholsterer. With a successful career in business, he later had offices at 209 Piccadilly (1866), and 20 Regent Street. His side interests in radical politics led him into pamphleteering, and were diverse.

== Early activism ==
Through the Metropolitan Parliamentary Reform Association, Beal met Francis Place and the Chartist carpenter George Huggett. He took part in the campaign against the taxes on knowledge.

Beal became an active reformer in the 1850s, and was a prominent political figure in the Westminster constituency from 1852. His early efforts there were thwarted by the Liberal Registration Society, which successfully brought in Sir John Villiers Shelley, 7th Baronet as candidate for Westminster, at the 1852 general election. With the bookseller Charles Westerton as ally, and local Chartist figures, Beal ran a vigorous and populist campaign for William Coningham, to no avail. Subsequently Sir George DeLacy Evans held the seat, to 1865.

== Municipal reform ==
Charles Westerton, Beal's ally, was elected to the London Metropolitan Board of Works in 1864. That year, Beal brought up 14 charges against the Board of Works, which are mostly now not considered well-founded. His scatter-gun approach included accusations of improper behaviour aimed at three Members of Parliament: Frederick Doulton, Sir William Jackson, 1st Baronet and Meaburn Staniland. Doulton was in the end tarnished by scandal in some opaque dealings, and resigned as MP.

Beal himself belonged to the select vestry of St James, Westminster, at the period the local government body for the civil parish. He became an advocate of the merging of London's vestries into municipal boroughs, coextensive with parliamentary constituencies. He invited John Stuart Mill to become a parliamentary candidate, and chaired the Westminster Liberal Electoral Committee that promoted Mill's successful 1865 candidacy for Westminster. The Metropolitan Municipal Association was founded by Beal in 1866, and Mill represented its views in parliament. In 1867 Beal had assistance from John Malcolm Forbes Ludlow in preparing bills. In the meantime, the Tory William Henry Smith made preparations that came to fruit in the 1868 general election, Beal later considering that the Liberals in Westminster had not engaged on the issues that mattered most to voters, the animation of election meetings ceasing after the days of the Anti-Corn Law League.

With Charles Buxton, Beal opposed the dominant position of the City of London Corporation in local government, under the slogan "the Juggernaut of Guildhall". Joseph Firth Bottomley Firth in 1876 described him as "the father of Municipal Reform in London". Bottomley Firth and Sir Charles Dilke were Chelsea neighbours of Beal, and together took up municipal reform with him. The Marxist H. M. Hyndman in 1887 criticised the "middle-class standpoint" of this group, suggesting that Beal would be happy to have the Duke of Westminster as Mayor of a Greater London.

== Other interests ==
In 1855, Beal attacked primogeniture. He supported "free trade in land" with Cobdenite arguments, as became common at this period; and promoted freehold land societies, and building societies. In 1861 he was advocating the replacement of income tax, to the London Financial Reform Association. His preference was for a land tax.

Beal ran utilities campaigns, intending to improve the consumers' lot in the supply of gas and water. He was active against the gas companies from 1857 to the passing of the Metropolitan Gas Act 1860. The outcome did not satisfy Beal, and in 1875 the Metropolitan Municipal Association sent a deputation to Sir Charles Adderley, President of the Board of Trade; further legislation was proposed. The gas companies played for time, but in 1876, three of the largest amalgamated. For water, its quality from the health point of view, and the regularity of supply, were ongoing issues. The main debate at mid-century, however, was over who should run the system and at what cost.

A clash on 10 April 1855, concerning an election for churchwardens at St Barnabas, Pimlico, led Beal into a court case on ritualism, against Rev. Robert Liddell. Liddell was a Tractarian advocate of music, in particular, to bring solemnity into the liturgy. A consistorial court decision by Stephen Lushington, on 5 December 1855, found in favour of Beal, with Charles Westerton, who were trying to limit ritual objects. The judgement was partially reversed on appeal.

During the 1874 general election, Beal himself was induced to come forward as a candidate for Westminster, on a thorough secular and egalitarian platform. He encountered the rival Liberal Sir Thomas Buxton, 3rd Baronet, with views more orthodox for the party. In the end, Beal withdrew. In 1880, he supported John Morley's candidature at Westminster, which was unsuccessful.

Beal was a member of the City Guilds Reform Association. In 1882, he gave evidence to the City of London Livery Companies Commission. His interests in this area included the control of charity funds, with an eye on defraying the expenses of an educational system. In 1875, he chaired a meeting for Thomas Holloway, discussing what became Royal Holloway College. He acted for Holloway also on behalf of Holloway Sanatorium.

== Later life ==
The Metropolitan Municipal Association did not in the longer term have a broad base of support, and in 1881 was absorbed into the London Municipal Reform League. In 1888 Beal was elected to the London County Council, representing Fulham, and standing, as did Firth who was also successful, for the Progressive Party. He was one of the small minority who opposed Lord Rosebery as chairman of the Provisional Council. He himself became chairman of its water committee. There he brought London's water supply under municipal control, an ambition he had harboured for two decades.

== Works ==
- A Few Words in Favor of the Liberty of the Press, and the Abolition of the Penny Stamp on Newspapers (1849)
- Free Trade in Land (1855)
- Direct Taxation. London Financial Reform Association. Observations addressed to the Members of the Westminster Reform Union (1862)
- The Next General Election: Lecture Delivered ... Before the Members of the Westminster Working Men's Liberal Association, January 15th 1873 (1873)
