= Robert Mark Gentry =

British politician and trade unionist

Robert Mark Gentry (1885 – 19 March 1951) was a British politician and trade unionist, who served as Mayor of Fulham and stood repeatedly for Parliament.

Gentry completed an elementary education before becoming a baker and confectioner. He also joined the Independent Labour Party (ILP), becoming Chairman and Honorary Secretary of the Fulham ILP. Active in the Amalgamated Union of Operative Bakers, he was appointed as the union's full-time London District Secretary, and was named by Paul Thompson as the ILP's leading London-based trade unionist in the 1900s.

Through the ILP, Gentry was active in the Labour Party, and was elected to Fulham Metropolitan Borough Council, serving as the first Labour Mayor of Fulham, from 1919 to 1921. Following his stint as mayor, he became secretary of the Metropolitan Labour Mayor's and Ex-Mayor's Association.

Gentry also stood for the Labour Party in Fulham West at general elections in 1918, 1922, 1923 and 1924, taking second place on each occasion.

Civic offices
Preceded by Henry Norris	Mayor of Fulham; 1919–1921	Succeeded by Louis Hill
