= 1958 London County Council election =

1958 local election in England

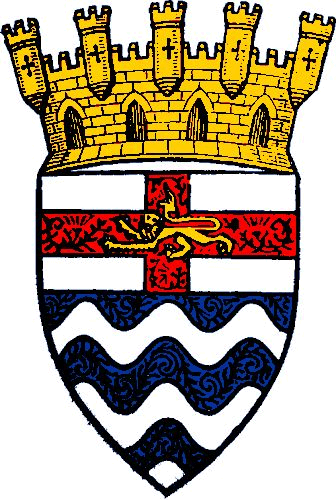
- 16 April 1958
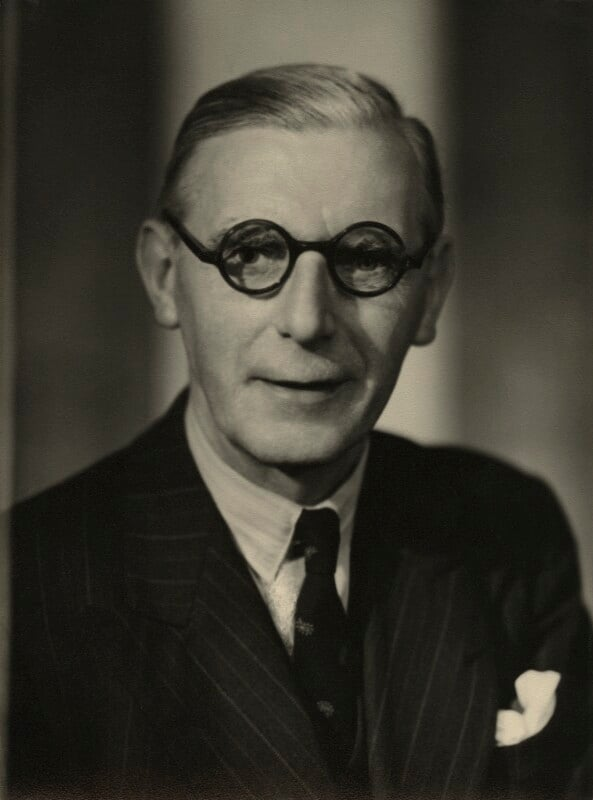
	First party	Second party
Leader	Isaac Hayward	Norris Kenyon
Party	Labour	Conservative
Leader since	1947	1952
Leader's seat	Alderman	Paddington South
Seats won	101	25
Seat change	▲27	▼27

An election to the County Council of London took place on 16 April 1958. The council was elected by First Past the Post with each elector having three votes in the three-member seats. The Labour Party, who had already run the council for 24 years, won their largest ever majority.

== Campaign ==
The Labour Party were optimistic about making gains, and targeted seats in Battersea South, Clapham, Lewisham West, Wandsworth Central and Woolwich West. The Conservatives targeted the marginal Labour-held constituencies of Barons Court, Kensington North and Paddington North. Their manifesto argued that the Labour Party were wasting money; they proposed reducing rates, and encouraged Londoners to move to new towns.

The Liberal Party stood 31 candidates, but reports suggested that they were hampered by poor organisation, and were not optimistic of taking a seat. The Communist Party of Great Britain and the Independent Labour Party each stood four candidates, while the Socialist Party of Great Britain stood three, and there were seven independents.

== Results ==
The Labour Party gained 27 seats from the Conservatives, giving them a record majority on the council.

Party	Votes			Seats	
Party	Number	%	Stood	Seats	%
Labour	422,875	58.4	126	101	80.2
Conservative	271,609	37.5	126	25	19.8
Liberal	21,672	3.0	31	0	0.0
Communist	4,772	0.7	4	0	0.0
Ind. Labour Party	1,382	0.2	4	0	0.0
Independent	1,334	0.2	5	0	0.0
Socialist (GB)	995	0.1	3	0	0.0
