= Cyril Cobb =

British politician (1861–1938)

Sir Cyril Stephen Cobb, KBE, MVO (1861 – 8 March 1938) was a British barrister and Conservative Party politician.

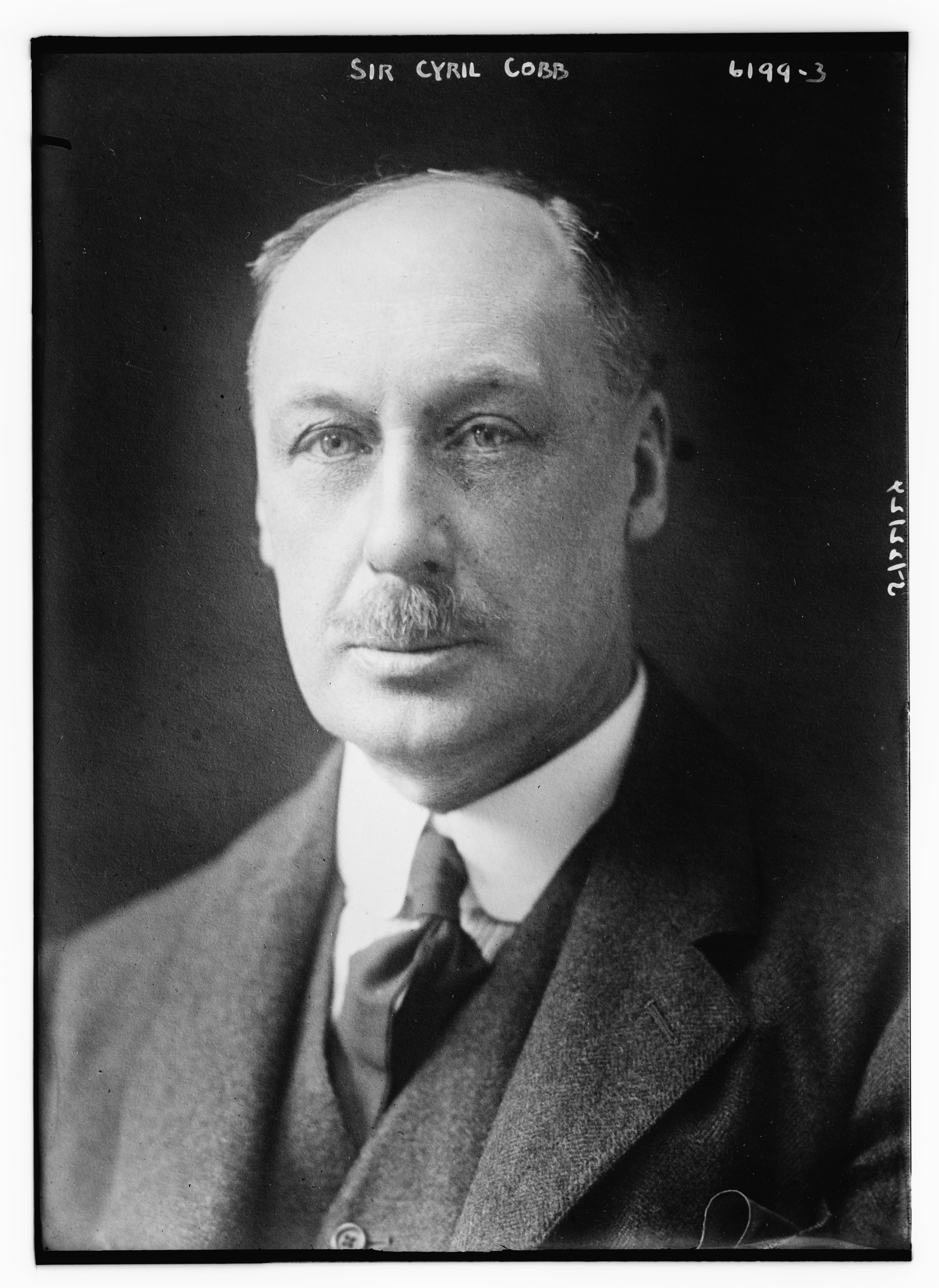

He was the son of J F Cobb of Margate, Kent. Following education at Newton Abbot, Devon and at Merton College, Oxford, he studied law. He was called to the bar at the Middle Temple in 1887.

In 1905 a by-election was held for a vacant London County Council seat at Fulham. Cobb was the candidate of the Conservative-backed Moderate Party, and succeeded in taking the seat from the majority Progressive Party. In 1907 the Moderates, reorganised as the Municipal Reform Party, gained control of the council. Cobb was to be a leading member of the authority for the next twenty-seven years, and was chairman in 1913 – 1914. He also served as chairman of the LCC's education committee. In 1934 the Labour Party gained control of the LCC, and Cobb lost his seat.

In the meantime, he had been elected to the Commons as Conservative Member of Parliament (MP) for Fulham West in 1918. He was briefly unseated at the 1929 general election, but regained the constituency at a by-election in the following year. He continued to represent Fulham West until his death.

He was made a member of the Royal Victorian Order in 1911 and a Knight Commander of the Order of the British Empire in 1918. He was a member of the London Survey Committee, a voluntary organisation publishing architectural surveys of the capital. He also served as honorary secretary of St Saviour's Hospital, Regent's Park. He died at his London home in March 1938, aged 76.

Political offices
Preceded by Lord Cheylesmore	Chairman of the London County Council; 1913 – 1914	Succeeded by Viscount Peel
Parliament of the United Kingdom
New constituency	Member of Parliament for Fulham West; 1918–1929	Succeeded by Ernest Spero
Preceded by Ernest Spero	Member of Parliament for Fulham West; 1930 – 1938	Succeeded by Edith Summerskill
