= Hackney North (London County Council constituency) =

London County Council constituency

- Former constituency for the London County Council

Former constituency
- Created: 1889
- Abolished: 1949
- Member(s): 2
- Replaced by: Stoke Newington and Hackney North

Hackney North was a constituency used for elections to the London County Council between 1889 and 1949. The seat shared boundaries with the UK Parliament constituency of the same name.

== Councillors ==
Year	Name	Party	Name	Party
1889	Joseph Beck	Moderate	Alfred Davies	Progressive
1891	Elijah Baxter Forman	Moderate	Alfred Davies	Progressive
1892	Elijah Baxter Forman	Moderate	John McCall	Progressive
1895	Elijah Baxter Forman	Moderate	Edward Baudouin Ellice-Clark	Moderate
1898	Elijah Baxter Forman	Moderate	George Lampard	Progressive
1901	John Sears	Progressive	George Lampard	Progressive
1907	Walter Greene	Moderate	Walter Henry Key	Moderate
1910	Oscar Emanuel Warburg	Municipal Reform	George Jones	Municipal Reform
1919	Oscar Emanuel Warburg	Municipal Reform	Lady Trustram Eve	Municipal Reform
1925	Oscar Emanuel Warburg	Municipal Reform	Evelyn Emmet	Municipal Reform
1931	Robert Spencer	Municipal Reform	Evelyn Emmet	Municipal Reform
1934	Molly Bolton	Labour	Henry Edwin Goodrich	Labour
1946	Molly Bolton	Labour	Max Sorsby	Labour

== Election results ==
1889 London County Council election: Hackney North
Party	Candidate	Votes	%	±%
Moderate	Joseph Beck	1,980		
Progressive	Alfred Davies	1,805		
Moderate	John Runtz	1,770		
Progressive	Edward Jones	1,029		
Moderate win (new seat)				
Progressive win (new seat)				

1891 Hackney North by-election
Party	Candidate	Votes	%	±%
Moderate	Elijah Baxter Forman	2,526		
Progressive	William Borrow Trick	1,735		
Moderate hold		Swing		

1892 London County Council election: Hackney North
Party	Candidate	Votes	%	±%
Moderate	Elijah Baxter Forman	3,580		
Progressive	John McCall	3,463		
Progressive	Charles Rose Witcher Offen	3,345		
Moderate	Charles C. Paine	3,249		
Moderate hold		Swing		
Progressive hold		Swing		

1895 London County Council election: Hackney North
Party	Candidate	Votes	%	±%
Moderate	Elijah Baxter Forman	3,121		
Moderate	Edward Baudouin Ellice-Clark	2,957		
Progressive	E. Reynolds	2,950		
Progressive	George Lampard	2,931		
Moderate hold		Swing		
Moderate gain from Progressive		Swing		

1898 London County Council election: Hackney North
Party	Candidate	Votes	%	±%
Moderate	Elijah Baxter Forman	3,507		
Progressive	George Lampard	2,783		
Progressive	M. Shaw	2,566		
Moderate	J. V. Fitzgerald	2,274		
Independent	E. Reynolds	1,779		
Moderate hold		Swing		
Progressive gain from Moderate		Swing		

1901 London County Council election: Hackney North
Party	Candidate	Votes	%	±%
Progressive	George Lampard	4,458	30.7	
Progressive	John Sears	4,257	29.4	
Conservative	Elijah Baxter Forman	2,968	20.5	
Conservative	Joseph Richmond	2,819	19.4	
Progressive hold		Swing		
Progressive gain from Conservative		Swing		

1904 London County Council election: Hackney North
Party	Candidate	Votes	%	±%
Progressive	George Lampard	4,372		
Progressive	John Sears	4,189		
Conservative	F. M. Miller	3,973		
Conservative	Walter Henry Key	3,942		
Majority				
Progressive hold		Swing		
Progressive hold		Swing		

1907 London County Council election: Hackney North
Party	Candidate	Votes	%	±%
Municipal Reform	Walter Henry Key	6,205		
Municipal Reform	Sir Raymond Greene	6,153		
Progressive	George Lampard	4,617		
Progressive	Price	4,530		
Majority				
Municipal Reform gain from Progressive		Swing		
Municipal Reform gain from Progressive		Swing		

1910 London County Council election: Hackney North
Party	Candidate	Votes	%	±%
Municipal Reform	George Jones	5,133	28.4	
Municipal Reform	Oscar Emanuel Warburg	5,042	27.9	
Progressive	Edward Calcott Pryce	3,970	21.9	
Progressive	John Bussey	3,953	21.8	
Majority		1,072	5.9	
Municipal Reform hold		Swing		
Municipal Reform hold		Swing		

1913 London County Council election: Hackney North
Party	Candidate	Votes	%	±%
Municipal Reform	George Jones	6,014	26.6	−1.8
Municipal Reform	Oscar Emanuel Warburg	5,965	26.4	−1.5
Progressive	William Ashley Nicholls	5,322	23.5	+1.6
Progressive	W. B. J. Hickman	5,299	23.4	+1.6
Majority		643	2.9	
Municipal Reform hold		Swing	-1.6	
Municipal Reform hold		Swing		

1919 London County Council election: Hackney North
Party	Candidate	Votes	%	±%
Municipal Reform	Lady Trustram Eve	Unopposed	n/a	n/a
Municipal Reform	Oscar Emanuel Warburg	Unopposed	n/a	n/a
Municipal Reform hold		Swing	n/a	
Municipal Reform hold		Swing	n/a	

1922 London County Council election: Hackney North
Party	Candidate	Votes	%	±%
Municipal Reform	Lady Trustram Eve	Unopposed	n/a	n/a
Municipal Reform	Oscar Emanuel Warburg	Unopposed	n/a	n/a
Municipal Reform hold		Swing	n/a	
Municipal Reform hold		Swing	n/a	

1925 London County Council election: Hackney North
Party	Candidate	Votes	%	±%
Municipal Reform	Oscar Emanuel Warburg	4,392		n/a
Municipal Reform	Evelyn Emmet	4,374		n/a
Progressive	John Chisham	1,924		n/a
Progressive	C. M. Merrifield	1,853		n/a
Labour	F. H. Plummer	1,808		n/a
Labour	E. Wigan	1,797		n/a
Municipal Reform hold		Swing	n/a	
Municipal Reform hold		Swing	n/a	

1928 London County Council election: Hackney North
Party	Candidate	Votes	%	±%
Municipal Reform	Evelyn Emmet	4,622		
Municipal Reform	Oscar Emanuel Warburg	4,514		
Liberal	John Chisholm	2,774		
Liberal	Alfred Ernest Newbould	2,614		
Labour	J. Goldberg	1,891		
Labour	A. G. Arrowsmith	1,807		
Independent Labour	Helen Crawfurd	605		n/a
Independent Labour	G. Abraham	528		n/a
Municipal Reform hold		Swing		
Municipal Reform hold		Swing		

1931 London County Council election: Hackney North
Party	Candidate	Votes	%	±%
Municipal Reform	Evelyn Emmet	5,306		
Municipal Reform	Robert Spencer	5,280		
Labour	A. G. Silver	3,129		
Labour	Henry Edwin Goodrich	3,122		
Municipal Reform hold		Swing		
Municipal Reform hold		Swing		

1934 London County Council election: Hackney North
Party	Candidate	Votes	%	±%
Labour	Henry Edwin Goodrich	5,261		
Labour	Molly Bolton	5,005		
Municipal Reform	Robert Spencer	4,661		
Municipal Reform	Evelyn Emmet	4,638		
Labour gain from Municipal Reform		Swing		
Labour gain from Municipal Reform		Swing		

1937 London County Council election: Hackney North
Party	Candidate	Votes	%	±%
Labour	Henry Edwin Goodrich	9,119		
Labour	Molly Bolton	9,038		
Municipal Reform	E. G. Gardiner	6,831		
Municipal Reform	A. M. Anderson	6,740		
Labour hold		Swing		
Labour hold		Swing		

1946 London County Council election: Hackney North
Party	Candidate	Votes	%	±%
Labour	Max Sorsby	5,166		
Labour	Molly Bolton	5,098		
Conservative	L. C. Loveless	1,789		
Conservative	Bertie Henry Bloomfield	1,731		
Labour hold		Swing		
Labour hold		Swing		
