= Sorsby =

Sorsby is a surname. Notable people with the surname include:

- Arnold Sorsby (1900–1980), Polish-British ophthalmologist and surgeon
- Brendan Sorsby (born 2004), American football quarterback
- Max Sorsby (1907–1975), British doctor and politician
- Robert Sorsby (1577–1624), English cutler, first to hold the position of Master Cutler
- Tom Sorsby (born 1996), English field hockey player
