= Robert Phayre (Indian Army officer) =

British army officer

General Sir Robert Phayre in 1879

General Sir Robert Phayre GCB (22 January 1820 – 28 January 1897) was a General in the Indian Army who served most of his military career in India including in the First Afghan War, the Second Afghan War, the Indian Mutiny and who was Resident at Baroda from 1873 to 1874 during which period Maharaja Malhar Rao Gaekwad, precipitated the Baroda Crisis and then attempted to poison Phayre, by putting arsenic and diamond dust in his sherbet.

== Early career ==
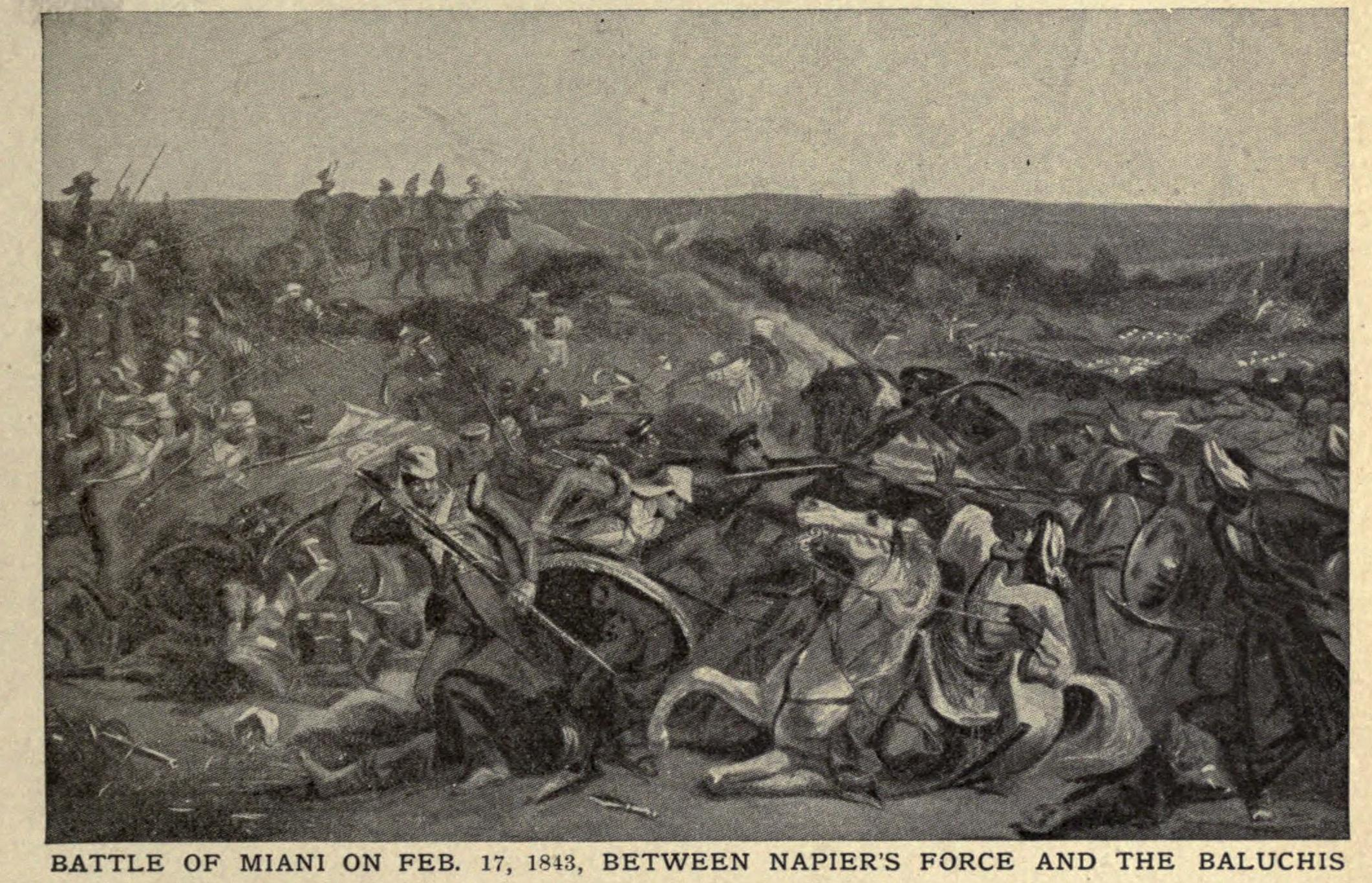
Phayre was severely wounded during the Battle of Miani (1843)

He was the son of Richard Phayre and Mary née Ridgeway of Shrewsbury, and a brother of General Sir Arthur Purves Phayre. His father was grandson of Colonel Robert Phayre, of Killoughram Forest. They were part of the Phayre Family, of which Lt Col Robert Phayre, who served the British administration in Ireland in the 17th-century, also had the death warrant of Charles I addressed to him and two other Colonels. Robert Phayre was educated at Shrewsbury School and commissioned as Ensign in the East India Company's service on 26 January 1839, being posted to the 25th Bombay Native Infantry, and became lieutenant on 1 December 1840. He served in the First Anglo-Afghan War with his regiment, was engaged with the Baluchis under Nasir Khan at Kotra and Gandava in December 1840, and was mentioned in despatches. He took part in the Sindh War of 1843, and was severely wounded at the Battle of Miani. He was again mentioned in despatches for bravery by Sir Charles Napier.

In 1844 he was appointed Assistant Quartermaster-General in Sindh, and from 1851 to 1856 was specially employed in clearing mountain roads in the Southern Mahratta country. In 1856-7 he carried out the departmental arrangements connected with the Anglo-Persian War. In March 1857 he was appointed Quartermaster-General to the Bombay Army, and acted in this capacity throughout the Indian Mutiny, his services being warmly commended by Sir Hugh Rose (later Lord Strathnairn) on 15 May 1860. He held this office until 1868. He had become captain in his regiment on 28 December 1848 and was made brevet major on 16 June 1857, and major in the Bombay Staff Corps on 18 February 1861.

He became brevet lieutenant-colonel on 6 January 1863, and colonel five years afterwards. He took part in the British Expedition to Abyssinia as Quartermaster-General, was mentioned in despatches, was made CB and aide-de-camp to Queen Victoria, and received the Abyssinian War Medal.

== Baroda Crisis ==
The Baroda Crisis - Malhar Rao and Phayre - The Graphic (1875)

From 1868 to 1872 he was political superintendent of the Sindh frontier, and commandant of the Frontier Force. In March 1873 he was appointed Resident at Baroda. He made strong representations of the gross tyranny and cruelty of the Gaekwad Maharaja Malhar Rao which precipitated the Baroda Crisis, and a commission which investigated his charges found that they were substantially proved. The Gaikwar received a warning and was advised to change his minister, but matters did not improve. The friction between Phayre and Malhar Rao increased, and at the instigation of the latter an attempt was made on 9 November 1874 to poison Phayre, by putting arsenic and diamond dust in his sherbet. The Baroda trial followed, and by order of the Secretary of State for India, Lord Salisbury, Malhar Rao was deposed on 10 April 1875 and exiled to Madras, where he died in obscurity in 1882. He was succeeded by the moderniser Sayajirao Gaekwad III. But the Indian Government had previously decided to change the Resident at Baroda and Phayre, declining to resign, was superseded by Sir Lewis Pelly on 25 November 1874.

== Second Afghan War ==
Reverting to military employment, Phayre commanded a brigade, first in Bombay and afterwards in Rajputana, from 10 May 1875 to 4 May 1880. Having been promoted Major-General on 1 January 1880, he was then appointed to the command of the reserve division of the army engaged in the Second Anglo-Afghan War and had charge of the line of communication by Quetta to Kandahar. After the disaster of the Battle of Maiwand on 27 July 1880 he was directed to push forward to Kandahar, besieged by Ayub Khan; but he was delayed by want of troops and transport, and Kandahar was relieved by General Frederick Roberts (afterwards Earl Roberts) at the Battle of Kandahar before his arrival. He was mentioned in despatches, was included in the vote of thanks of Parliament, was made KCB on 22 February 1881, and received the Afghanistan Medal.

== Later years ==
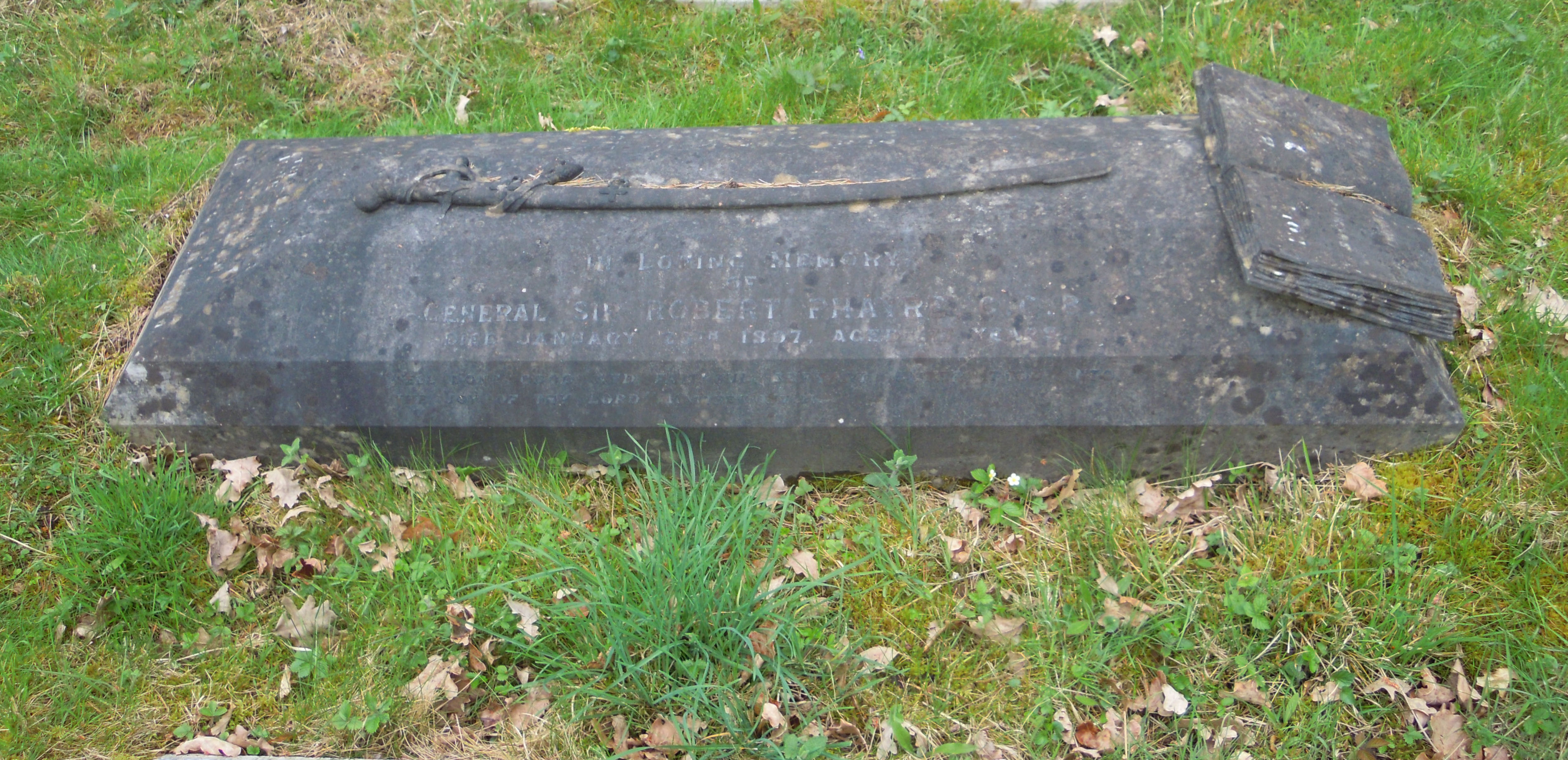
Phayre's grave in Brookwood Cemetery

He commanded a division of the Bombay Army from 1 March 1881 to 2 March 1886, when the Bombay government paid a high compliment to his services on his retirement. For some months previously he had acted as provincial Commander-in-Chief at Bombay. On 22 January 1887 he was placed on the unemployed supernumerary list. He had become Lieutenant-General on 1 November 1881, and became General on 22 January 1889. He received the G.C.B. on 26 May 1894. Phayre took an active part in religious and philanthropic movements, and published some pamphlets, including The Bible versus Corrupt Christianity (J. Kensit, 1890), The Foundation of Rock or of Sand : Which? (in reply to Henry Drummond, J. Kensit, 1890), Scriptural Account of the War now raging between the power of Satan and the power of God, J. Kensit, 1895, The Everlasting Gospel of the Old and New Testaments (a collection of the sermons of Charles Spurgeon, published by Passmore & Alabaster, London (1897)), Monasticism Unveiled (published by J. Kensit, 1890) and A Word of Testimony, in Reply to Mr. Gladstone's Article ( J. F. Shaw & Co, London, 1895). Other publications included Report on the Road to Mahabuleshwur, via Ambur Khind and Mundur Dew (Bombay, 1862) and Abyssinia Expedition: Official Journey of the Reconnoitering Party of the British Force in Abyssinia (Quarter Master General's Office, Poona, 1867–1869). He died at his home, 64 St George's Square, Pimlico, London on 28 January 1897 and was buried in Brookwood Cemetery.

== Personal life ==
In 1846, he had married Diana Bunbury Thompson, (1821–1904), daughter of Arnold Thompson, formerly paymaster of the 81st Regiment. She survived him. A son was Robert Phayre (1853–1886) who joined the Indian Civil Service in 1871 and who was to die fighting insurgents in Upper Burma after his party had been surprised by rebels. His men fell back, leaving his body which was carried off by the Burmese. Later a search party found his remains to discover he had been decapitated and quartered, his head and quarters being found suspended from the branches of different trees. A younger son was Lt. Colonel Arthur Phayre (1856–1940) and their daughters were Anna Maria Phayre (who married Arthur William Crawley Boevey), Alice Marion and Caroline Emily Phayre.
