= Kensington South (London County Council constituency) =

London County Council constituency

- Former constituency for the London County Council

Former constituency
- Created: 1889
- Abolished: 1965
- Member(s): 2 (to 1949); 3 (from 1949)

Kensington South was a constituency used for elections to the London County Council between 1889 and the council's abolition, in 1965. The seat shared boundaries with the UK Parliament constituency of the same name.

== Councillors ==
Year	Name	Party	Name	Party	Name	Party
1889	Charles Hallyburton Campbell	Moderate	Walter Haweis James	Moderate	Two seats until 1949	
1893	Charles Hallyburton Campbell	Moderate	Charles Thompson Beresford-Hope	Moderate	Two seats until 1949	
1896	Charles Hallyburton Campbell	Moderate	Richard Robinson	Moderate	Two seats until 1949	
1898	Charles Hallyburton Campbell	Moderate	Richard Robinson	Moderate	Two seats until 1949	
1904	Frederic Thesiger	Moderate	Richard Robinson	Moderate	Two seats until 1949	
1905	Charles Frederick Colvile	Moderate	Richard Robinson	Moderate	Two seats until 1949	
1907	Elijah Baxter Forman	Municipal Reform	Richard Robinson	Municipal Reform	Two seats until 1949	
1910	William Frederick Cavaye	Municipal Reform	William Whitaker Thompson	Municipal Reform	Two seats until 1949	
1913	William Frederick Cavaye	Municipal Reform	Augustus Gilbert Colvile	Municipal Reform	Two seats until 1949	
1919	William Frederick Cavaye	Municipal Reform	Henry Vincent Rowe	Municipal Reform	Two seats until 1949	
1925	Lady Trustram Eve	Municipal Reform	Henry Vincent Rowe	Municipal Reform	Two seats until 1949	
1927	Lady Trustram Eve	Municipal Reform	Frederick Williams	Municipal Reform	Two seats until 1949	
1929	Lady Trustram Eve	Municipal Reform	Charlotte Keeling	Municipal Reform	Two seats until 1949	
1931	Alexander Henry Melvill Wedderburn	Municipal Reform	Charlotte Keeling	Municipal Reform	Two seats until 1949	
1934	Robert Jenkins	Municipal Reform	Charlotte Keeling	Municipal Reform	Two seats until 1949	
1935	Robert Jenkins	Municipal Reform	Angela, Countess of Limerick	Municipal Reform	Two seats until 1949	
1946	Robert Jenkins	Municipal Reform	Elizabeth Evelyn Pepler	Conservative	Two seats until 1949	
1949	Ian Harvey	Conservative	Elizabeth Evelyn Pepler	Conservative	Cecilia Petrie	Conservative
1952	John Gerald Gapp	Conservative	Elizabeth Evelyn Pepler	Conservative	Cecilia Petrie	Conservative
1955	Robert Lewis Vigars	Conservative	Elizabeth Evelyn Pepler	Conservative	Cecilia Petrie	Conservative
1961	Robert Lewis Vigars	Conservative	John O. Udal	Conservative	Cecilia Petrie	Conservative

== Election results ==
1889 London County Council election: Kensington South
Party	Candidate	Votes	%	±%
Moderate	Charles Hallyburton Campbell	2,086		
Moderate	Walter Haweis James	2,015		
Progressive	T. Melladew	861		
Moderate	Jubal Webb	738		
Moderate	William A. Lindsay	629		
Independent	J. W. Duffield	596		
Moderate win (new seat)				
Moderate win (new seat)				

1892 London County Council election: Kensington South
Party	Candidate	Votes	%	±%
Moderate	Charles Hallyburton Campbell	Unopposed	N/A	N/A
Moderate	Walter Haweis James	Unopposed	N/A	N/A
Moderate hold		Swing	N/A	
Moderate hold		Swing	N/A	

1893 Kensington South by-election
Party	Candidate	Votes	%	±%
Moderate	Charles Thompson Beresford-Hope	2,217		
Independent Progressive	Jubal Webb	891		
Moderate hold		Swing	N/A	

1895 London County Council election: Kensington South
Party	Candidate	Votes	%	±%
Moderate	Charles Thompson Beresford-Hope	3,132		
Moderate	Charles Hallyburton Campbell	3,085		
Progressive	M. Williams	872		
Progressive	J. Braye	543		
Moderate hold		Swing	N/A	
Moderate hold		Swing	N/A	

1898 London County Council election: Kensington South
Party	Candidate	Votes	%	±%
Moderate	Charles Hallyburton Campbell	3,078		
Moderate	Richard Robinson	3,056		
Progressive	S. Mayer	648		
Progressive	I. A. Symmons	639		
Moderate hold		Swing		
Moderate hold		Swing		

1901 London County Council election: Kensington South
Party	Candidate	Votes	%	±%
Conservative	Charles Hallyburton Campbell	2,264	37.6	−3.9
Conservative	Richard Robinson	2,253	37.4	3.8
Progressive	Edward Holton Coumbe	758	12.6	+3.9
Progressive	Rodney John Fennessy	754	12.5	+3.9
Conservative hold		Swing		
Conservative hold		Swing	-3.9	

1904 London County Council election: Kensington South
Party	Candidate	Votes	%	±%
Conservative	Richard Robinson	3,538		
Conservative	Frederic Thesiger	3,519		
Progressive	Philip Carr	682		
Progressive	H. J. Norton	660		
Majority				
Conservative hold		Swing		

1907 London County Council election: Kensington South
Party	Candidate	Votes	%	±%
Municipal Reform	Richard Robinson	5,869		
Municipal Reform	Elijah Baxter Forman	5,834		
Progressive	V. R. Aronson	788		
Progressive	W. James	770		
Majority				
Municipal Reform hold		Swing		

1910 London County Council election: Kensington South
Party	Candidate	Votes	%	±%
Municipal Reform	William Frederick Cavaye	4,752		
Municipal Reform	William Whitaker Thompson	4,701		
Progressive	J. E. Allen	566		
Progressive	John Llewellyn Williams	543		
Majority				
Municipal Reform hold		Swing		

1913 London County Council election: Kensington South
Party	Candidate	Votes	%	±%
Municipal Reform	William Frederick Cavaye	5,072	44.1	−0.9
Municipal Reform	Augustus Gilbert Colvile	4,997	43.4	−1.1
Progressive	F. C. Jarvis	731	6.3	+1.0
Progressive	Harry Christopher Bickmore	713	6.2	+1.1
Majority		4,266	37.1	−2.1
Municipal Reform hold		Swing	-1.0	
Municipal Reform hold		Swing	-1.0	

1919 London County Council election: Kensington South
Party	Candidate	Votes	%	±%
Municipal Reform	William Frederick Cavaye	Unopposed	n/a	n/a
Municipal Reform	Henry Vincent Rowe	Unopposed	n/a	n/a
Municipal Reform hold		Swing	n/a	
Municipal Reform hold		Swing	n/a	

1922 London County Council election: Kensington South
Party	Candidate	Votes	%	±%
Municipal Reform	William Frederick Cavaye	Unopposed	n/a	n/a
Municipal Reform	Henry Vincent Rowe	Unopposed	n/a	n/a
Municipal Reform hold		Swing	n/a	
Municipal Reform hold		Swing	n/a	

1925 London County Council election: Kensington South
Party	Candidate	Votes	%	±%
Municipal Reform	Fanny Jean Turing	Unopposed	n/a	n/a
Municipal Reform	Henry Vincent Rowe	Unopposed	n/a	n/a
Municipal Reform hold		Swing	n/a	
Municipal Reform hold		Swing	n/a	

1928 London County Council election: Kensington South
Party	Candidate	Votes	%	±%
Municipal Reform	Fanny Jean Turing	Unopposed	n/a	n/a
Municipal Reform	Frederick Williams	Unopposed	n/a	n/a
Municipal Reform hold		Swing	n/a	
Municipal Reform hold		Swing	n/a	

Kensington South by-election, 1929
Party	Candidate	Votes	%	±%
Municipal Reform	Charlotte Keeling	5,816		
Labour	M. L. Piercy	943		
Municipal Reform hold		Swing		

1931 London County Council election: Kensington South
Party	Candidate	Votes	%	±%
Municipal Reform	Charlotte Keeling	Unopposed	n/a	n/a
Municipal Reform	Alexander Henry Melvill Wedderburn	Unopposed	n/a	n/a
Municipal Reform hold		Swing	n/a	
Municipal Reform hold		Swing	n/a	

1934 London County Council election: Kensington South
Party	Candidate	Votes	%	±%
Municipal Reform	Robert Jenkins	Unopposed	n/a	n/a
Municipal Reform	Charlotte Keeling	Unopposed	n/a	n/a
Municipal Reform hold		Swing	n/a	
Municipal Reform hold		Swing	n/a	

1937 London County Council election: Kensington South
Party	Candidate	Votes	%	±%
Municipal Reform	Angela, Countess of Limerick	14,350		n/a
Municipal Reform	Robert Jenkins	14,323		n/a
Labour	L. Clive	1,650		n/a
Labour	C. Rothwell	1,562		n/a
Municipal Reform hold		Swing	n/a	
Municipal Reform hold		Swing	n/a	

1946 London County Council election: Kensington South
Party	Candidate	Votes	%	±%
Conservative	Robert Jenkins	13,234		
Conservative	Elizabeth Evelyn Halton	13,106		
Labour	M. J. Thomas	2,192		n/a
Labour	H. Budd	2,160		n/a
Conservative hold		Swing		
Conservative hold		Swing		

1949 London County Council election: Kensington South
Party	Candidate	Votes	%	±%
Conservative	Ian Harvey	21,400		
Conservative	Elizabeth Evelyn Pepler	21,126		
Conservative	Cecilia Petrie	21,077		
Labour	A. L. Grieves	3,781		
Labour	F. D. Winterton	3,627		
Labour	M. M. Yorke	3,548		
Union Movement	V. C. Burgess	646		
Union Movement	R. J. A. Hamer	607		
Conservative win (new seat)				
Conservative hold		Swing		
Conservative hold		Swing		

1952 London County Council election: Kensington South
Party	Candidate	Votes	%	±%
Conservative	Elizabeth Evelyn Pepler	20,523		
Conservative	John Gerald Gapp	20,521		
Conservative	Cecilia Petrie	20,489		
Labour	E. Newman	2,471		
Labour	P. E. Williamson	2,414		
Labour	C. Cranage	2,410		
Union Movement	V. C. Burgess	560		
Union Movement	S. F. Vine	442		
Union Movement	O. Grose	418		
Conservative hold		Swing		
Conservative hold		Swing		
Conservative hold		Swing		

1955 London County Council election: Kensington South
Party	Candidate	Votes	%	±%
Conservative	Cecilia Petrie	16,235		
Conservative	Elizabeth Evelyn Pepler	16,137		
Conservative	Robert Lewis Viggars	16,018		
Labour	T. Ponsonby	1,953		
Labour	K. Daniels	1,798		
Labour	J. Holland	1,779		
Conservative hold		Swing		
Conservative hold		Swing		
Conservative hold		Swing		

1958 London County Council election: Kensington South
Party	Candidate	Votes	%	±%
Conservative	Cecilia Petrie	12,956		
Conservative	Elizabeth Evelyn Pepler	12,745		
Conservative	Robert Lewis Viggars	13,006		
Labour	T. P. Morris	2,118		
Labour	R. Twite	2,082		
Labour	M. J. Barber	2,010		
Conservative hold		Swing		
Conservative hold		Swing		
Conservative hold		Swing		

1961 London County Council election: Kensington South
Party	Candidate	Votes	%	±%
Conservative	Cecilia Petrie	13,110		
Conservative	Robert Lewis Viggars	13,006		
Conservative	John O. Udal	12,944		
Liberal	Margaret Nielson	1,973		
Liberal	John Pardoe	1,954		
Liberal	Anthony Arthur William Dix	1,951		
Labour	I. S. Richard	1,377		
Labour	Alan Jinkinson	1,188		
Labour	C. J. Cowling	1,115		
Conservative hold		Swing		
Conservative hold		Swing		
Conservative hold		Swing		
