= Lewis Pelly =

British Army officer & MP (1825–1892)

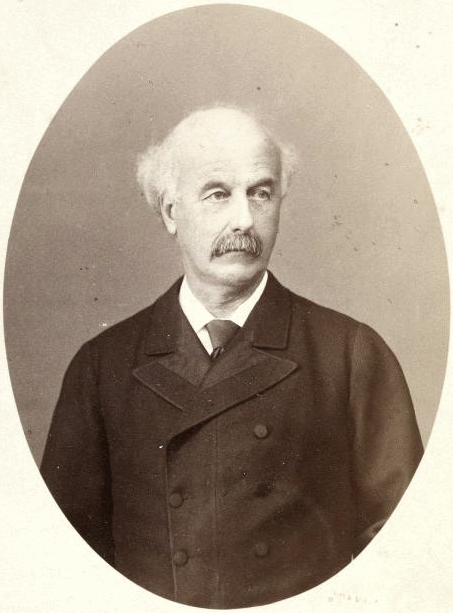
- Sir Lewis Pelly, 1882 photograph
- Born: 14 November 1825; Minchinhampton, Gloucestershire, England
- Died: 22 April 1892 (aged 66); Falmouth, Cornwall, England
- Military career
- Allegiance: United Kingdom
- Branch: British Indian Army
- Rank: Lieutenant General
- Awards: Knight Commander of the Order of the Star of India

Lieutenant General Sir Lewis Pelly KCSI (14 November 1825 – 22 April 1892) was a British East India Company officer, and then an imperial army and political officer. At the end of his life, he was a Conservative Member of Parliament for Hackney North, from 1885 to 1892.

== Early years ==
He was the son of John Hinde Pelly of Hyde House, Gloucestershire, and his wife Elizabeth Lewis. He was educated at Rugby School. Sir John Henry Pelly, Governor of the Hudson's Bay Company and Governor of the Bank of England, was his uncle.

== First period in India ==
Pelly entered the East India Company service in 1840. In 1841 he was commissioned in the Bombay Army as an ensign. He served in Sind before its annexation. Appointed to the regimental staff in 1842, he was promoted to lieutenant in 1843.

Moved to a political role in the system of British indirect rule, Pelly in 1851–2 was posted to Baroda State. There he had a prosecuting role in James Outram's corruption enquiry, assistant reader at the court of the Gaekwar. He then transferred to the civil service of Sind Division until 1856, being promoted to captain in 1855.

In the Anglo-Persian War of 1856–7, Pelly was aide-de-camp to General John Jacob, and commanded a troop of cavalry. He was secretary to Sir James Outram during the occupation of Bushire and Kharg Island. In April 1858 he was in London, where he had his book on Jacob published, and met Herbert Spencer at John Chapman's house, 142 The Strand.

Pelly served as brigade major in the Frontier Force of the Scinde Irregular Horse, commanded by Jacob, in 1858. He was made a judge in Karachi in 1859.

== In Persia ==
Pelly was secretary of the British legation in Tehran at the court of Persia from 1859 to 1860: taking up the post, he rode to Tehran from Trebizond. He was then appointed chargé d'affaires there. Henry Rawlinson left the legation during this period, replaced as its head by Charles Alison.

Alison sent Pelly on a special mission to Herat, in line with Rawlinson's idea that a British agent there would counter Russian influence. In the aftermath of the Treaty of Paris that had ended the Anglo-Persian conflict, the ruler there was Ahmed Khan (Sultan Jan). Pelly departed to visit Sultan Jan in Herat, with a small party and six horses, in September 1860. From Herat, he travelled on to Farah, Kandahar and Qalati Ghilji.

== Roving political agent ==
In 1860 Pelly had travelled overland on a horse, in uniform, from Tehran most of the way to Calcutta, a feat that impressed Sir Bartle Frere. Like Rawlinson, Frere was a leading advocate of the 1860s of a Forward Policy for British India; and in particular of a British Agent at Herat and other strategic hotspots. Frere took Pelly under his wing, and became a patron of his career.

In 1861 Pelly went to the Comoros Islands, where he was shipwrecked on Johanna (Anjouan); and to Mozambique. In May 1861, he was part of the expedition which placed Bahrain under British tutelage, even if theoretically it was in the sphere of influence of Persia.

Pelly was then appointed political agent and consul at Zanzibar. A deal brokered by Charles Canning, 1st Earl Canning separated the Sultanate of Zanzibar from the Sultanate of Oman came into effect in April 1861. It involved an annual subsidy from Zanzibar to Oman, the Canning Award agreed at the level of 40,000 Maria Theresa thalers. The sum represented about 20% of Zanzibar's revenue from the Indian Ocean slave trade. In the years that followed, Imam Azzan bin Qais took power in Oman from Thuwaini bin Said, and Majid bin Said of Zanzibar was reluctant to make the payments. Pelly took the side of Majid bin Said in the dispute.

From Zanzibar, Pelly visited and reported on the Seychelle Islands in 1862. Next, he was transferred back to Persia as political resident (1862 to 1872). On Frere's advice, he sought out William Mackinnon. Frere and Mackinnon had been discussing possible new British India Steam Navigation Company shipping lines from Bombay, to the Red Sea and Zanzibar. Mackinnon and Pelly then corresponded. With William Mansfield and Matthew Sausse, Pelly was in the small group of well-placed British imperial staff who took up advantageous offers of British India Steam Navigation stock from Mackinnon in the 1860s.

The Persian Gulf Telegraph Cable was planned and laid in the years leading up to 1864. Pelly was involved in surveys, of the north end of the Gulf, and on the proposed route. The plan approved in 1862, by Colonel Patrick Stewart, would connect Fao by the Shatt al Arab to Karachi. Pelly caused some confusion by a proposal for radical change in British arrangements, organised around a centre on the Musandam Peninsula.

Pelly officially visited Riyadh in 1865 to meet with the ruler of the Second Saudi State, Faisal bin Turki. At this point, he counted as the chief political resident in the Persian Gulf area, and was keen to promote trade. He made an inland journey to the Nejd, and an associated map. On the return sea journey from Bushire, heading for Muscat on the SS Berenice, captain Edwin Dawes, the vessel caught fire, and the passengers and crew made for Sheikh Shoeyb Island in lifeboats. Pelly published an account of his journey.

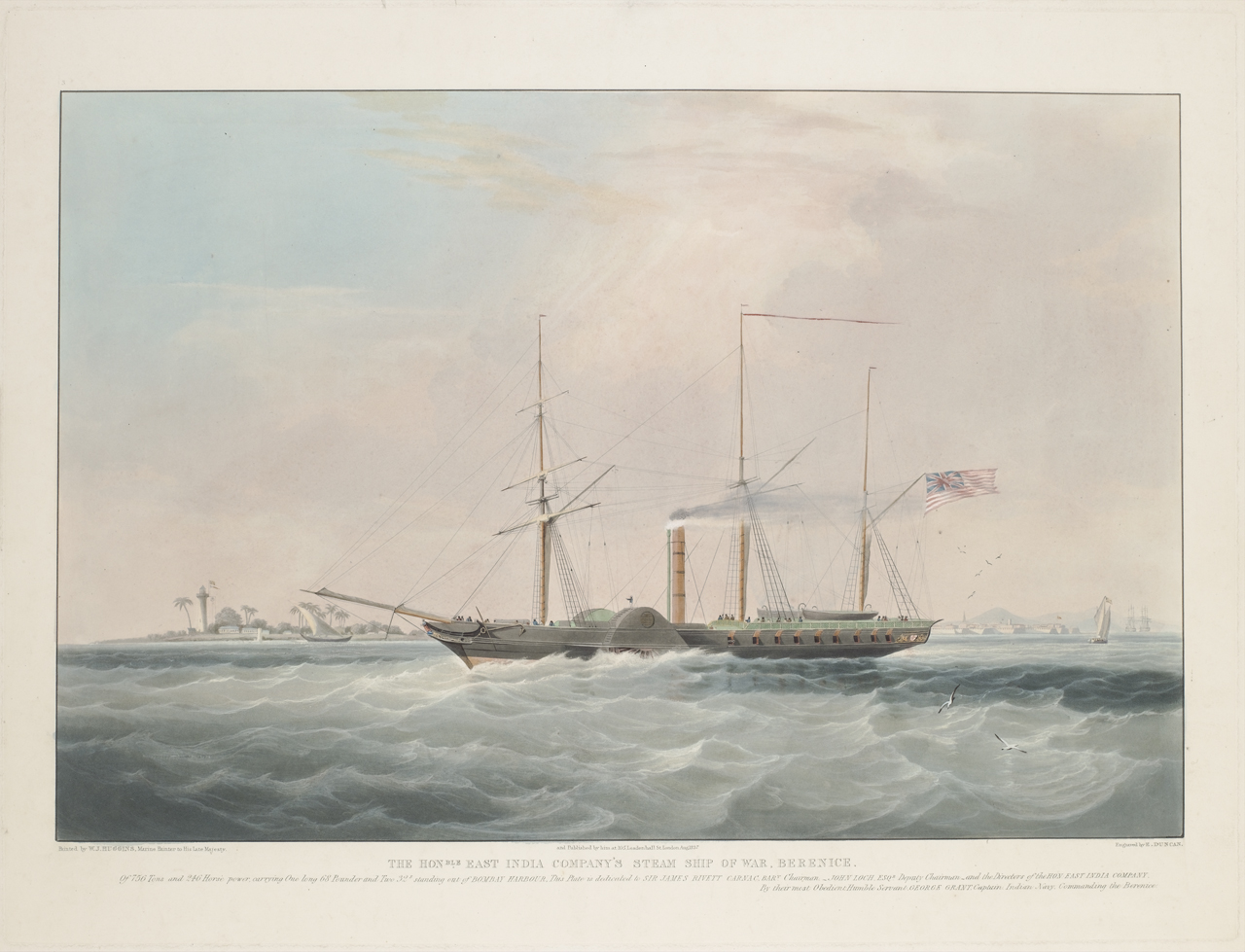
East India Company Steam Ship of War Berenice, lost in 1865 when it caught fire with Lewis Pelly on board in the Persian Gulf

The Qatari–Bahraini War broke out in 1867. When he was in a position to make a show of strength, in autumn 1868 Pelly sailed to Bahrain with the sloops HMS Daphne and HMS Nymphe, and the gunboats HMS Clyde and HMS Hugh Rose. The outcome by 6 September 1868 was that Muhammad bin Khalifa Al Khalifa was deposed, and his brother Ali bin Khalifa Al Khalifa became the ruler of Bahrain. On 12 September, Pelly signed a treaty with Mohammed bin Thani which recognised the independence of Qatar. In October he went to Bombay in HMS Vigilant.

Pelly was promoted to major in 1861, lieutenant colonel in 1866, and colonel in 1871.

=== Anti-slavery mission ===
In 1872–1873, Pelly accompanied Sir Bartle Frere in the anti-slavery mission to the east coast of Africa. Others on the expedition included George Percy Badger as Arabic interpreter, and Kazi Shahabudi from Kutch, representing Indian traders with East Africa. The investigation, on behalf of the Anti-Slavery Society, had originally been intended by Frere to be led by Pelly, without Frere's participation.

Frere in Muscat and Zanzibar was unable to negotiate an end to the Zanzibar slave trade, but John Kirk, consul in Zanzibar, did so shortly thereafter.

== Second period in India ==
On 21 June 1873, Pelly was appointed agent to the governor general of Rajputana, remaining in this post until 1878. This was the period of the Baroda Crisis. The embattled Robert Phayre, resident in Baroda, was the apparent victim of an attempted poisoning in November 1874, on the orders of its ruler Malhar Rao Gaekwad; but was unwilling to resign. He was replaced by Pelly later that month. Pelly had Malhar Rao arrested in January 1875, and tried by a commission. The outcome was inconclusive, but Malhar Rao was deposed. Pelly was knighted (K.C.B.) in 1877.

Lord Lytton arrived in India in 1876, as incoming viceroy, and it was proposed to send Pelly to Kabul as envoy; but this offer was rejected by the Emir of Afghanistan. Lytton had Pelly write to the emir, who found reasons against the proposed "Pelly mission", which would have been an unpopular concession. In particular, he argued that Konstantin Petrovich von Kaufmann for Russia could also demand a mission. In January 1877 Pelly met the sadr-i a'zam Sayyid Nur Muhammad Shah representing the emir, Sher Ali Khan, in Peshawar. He stated that the admission of British agents to Afghanistan was a prerequisite for talks. The discussions led nowhere, and Pelly, who had plenipotentiary powers, was told to withdraw from them in March. Nur Muhammad was by then seriously ill, and he died on 26 March. The Second Anglo-Afghan War began the following year.

== Later life ==
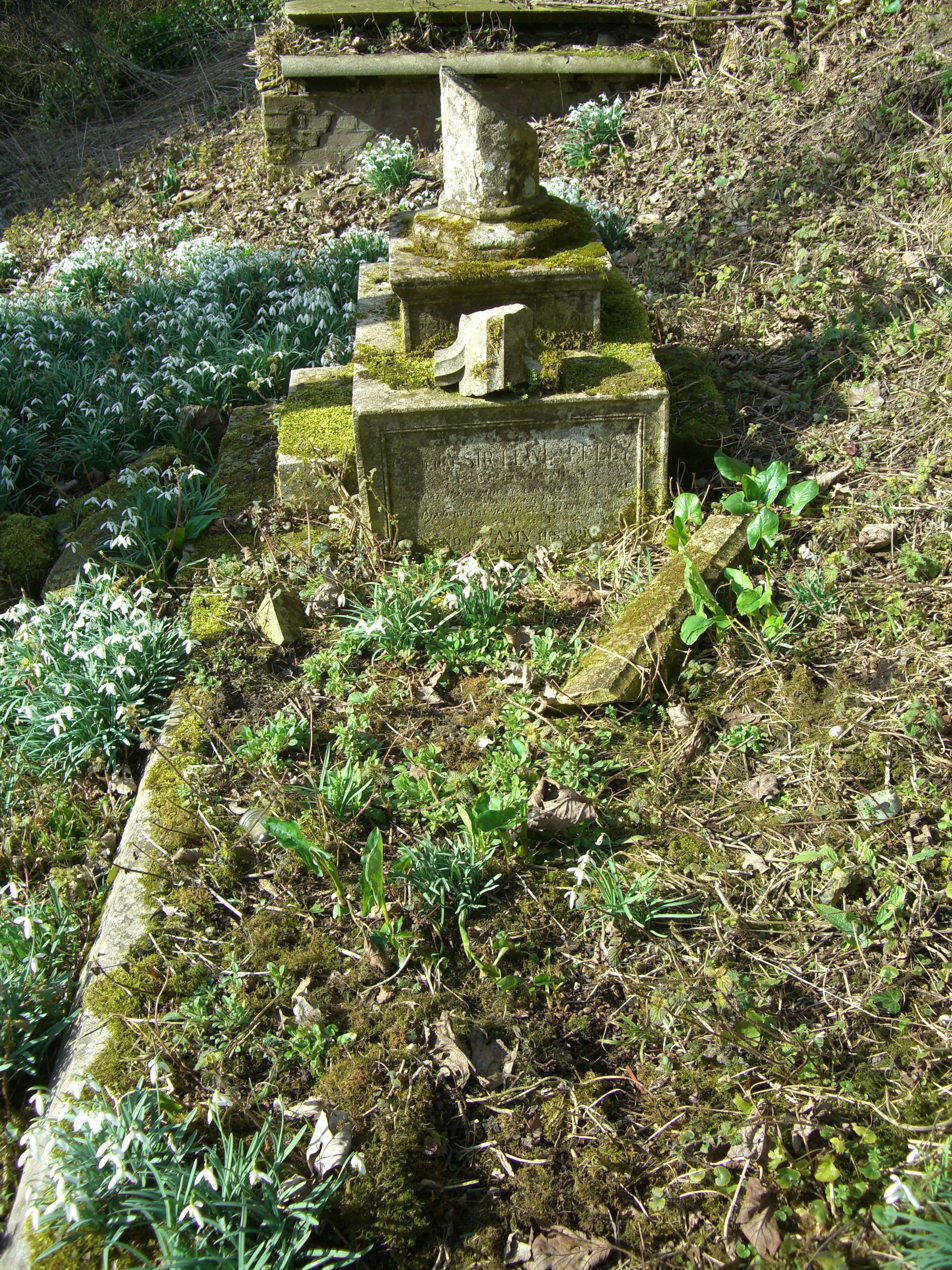
The grave of Lewis Pelly at St Katharine's Merstham

In 1878 Pelly returned to the United Kingdom. In 1885, by now a lieutenant general, he was elected as Conservative Member of Parliament for the newly created North Hackney constituency. In 1886 he attended the Annual General Meeting of the National Society for Women's Suffrage.

Pelly became a director of the Imperial British East Africa Company. On 8 March 1892 J. G. Swift MacNeill objected in Parliament to votes made by Pelly, William Burdett-Coutts and John Henry Puleston, directors and shareholders in the Imperial British East Africa Company, on a grant for a survey to be made from the East African coast to Lake Victoria Nyanza of a railway route. MacNeill's motion was successful, and the "distinction of degree" of self-interest involved in this "Mombasa railway" instance of disallowal of votes persisted in parliamentary practice.

Pelly died in Falmouth on 22 April 1892, and is buried adjacent to Rutherford Alcock at Merstham in Surrey.

== Honours ==
- C. S. I., 1867
- K. C. S. I., 1874

== Family ==
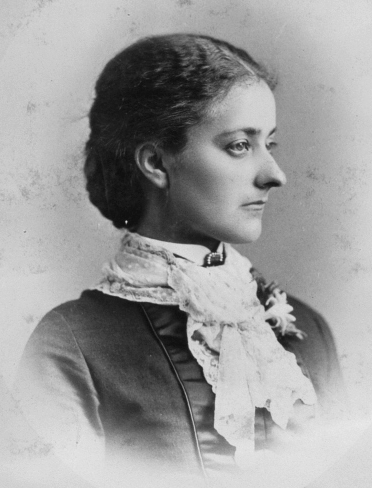
Amy Lady Pelly, 1880 photograph

In 1878 Pelly married Amy Henrietta Lowder, who was born in 1847 at Calne in Wiltshire to the Rev. John Samuel Lowder. Her father was an Anglican chaplain in Shanghai, and died by drowning in 1849. Her mother Lucy Windsor then in 1862 married Rutherford Alcock as his second wife. She died on 31 May 1924, in Eccleston Street, London.

In 1882, the couple were living at 1, Eaton Square, London. They had no children.

== Publications ==
- Our North West Frontier (1858), pamphlet
- The Views and Opinions of Brigadier General John Jacob K.C.B. (1858)
- Report on a Journey to Riyadh in Central Arabia, 1865, 1866 text reprinted with an introduction by Robin Leonard Bidwell
- The Miracle Play of Hasan and Husain (1879, 2 vols.), English translation from the Persian of 37 ta'ziyeh dramas, revised and with notes by Arthur Naylor Wollaston. Pelly's translations followed those by Aleksander Chodźko, into French.

Government offices
Preceded by James Felix Jones	Chief Political Resident of the Persian Gulf; 1862–1872	Succeeded by Edward Charles Ross
Preceded by Richard Keatinge	Chief Commissioner of Ajmer-Merwara; 1873–1878	Succeeded by Edward Bradford
Parliament of the United Kingdom
New constituency see Hackney	Member of Parliament for North Hackney; 1885–1892	Succeeded by William Robert Bousfield QC
