= Lady Eve =

Lady Eve may refer to:

- The Lady Eve, a 1941 comedy film by Preston Sturges
- Fanny Jean Turing, Lady Trustram Eve (1864–1934), British politician
- Lady Eve, a character in the DC Comics universe
