= John Harris (anti-slavery campaigner) =

British missionary and politician (1874–1940)

John Hobbis Harris

Sir John Hobbis Harris (29 July 1874 – 30 April 1940) was an English missionary, campaigner against slavery and Liberal Party politician.

== Family ==
Harris was born in Wantage, Oxfordshire. His father, also John Hobbis Harris, was a plumber and later a builder. On 6 May 1898 he married Alice Seeley from Frome in Somerset. They had two sons and two daughters.

== Career ==
Harris worked in the City of London for a firm of gentlemen's outfitters. He was a devout Christian and did evangelical social work before training to become a Protestant missionary in Central Africa. He and his wife departed for the Congo Free State soon after their marriage but they were soon horrified by the brutal treatment, murder and enslavement of the native people at the hands of the Belgian and other European agents exploiting the territory for rubber and ivory.

== Campaigner ==
To protest at what they saw in Africa, Harris and his wife became active campaigners. They brought these atrocities to the attention of the British government and politicians, gave evidence at hearings, published books, papers and photographs, gave lectures and addressed hundreds of public meetings. Ahead of his time, Harris became a campaigner against the colonial system of the day and promoted the idea of self-determination for native peoples. One of the political campaigners he found would listen was E. D. Morel, who was a co-founder of the Congo Reform Association of which Harris was a member. Harris valued international co-operation and was for a while a member of the Executive Committee of the League of Nations Union.

== Politics ==
=== 1910–1922 ===
From 1910 Harris was organising secretary to the Anti-Slavery and Aborigines Protection Society. This association led him to take up active politics. He was President of Dulwich Liberal Association and first contested a Parliamentary seat at Camberwell North West as an Independent Asquithian Liberal at the 1922 general election. In a three-cornered contest with Dr T J Macnamara the Lloyd George National Liberal and Dr H B W Morgan for Labour Harris came third with 19.5% of the vote.

=== 1923 ===
Harris entered Parliament at the 1923 general election when he was elected Liberal Member of Parliament (MP) for North Hackney, defeating the sitting Conservative member Sir Walter Greene by 11,177 votes to 9,523 – a majority of 1,654.

=== 1924–1929 ===
He defended his seat in general election of 1924 but this time, against a new Tory candidate, Austin Hudson and facing a three-cornered fight with Labour he lost to Hudson by 4,794 votes.

Harris tried to regain his seat the 1929 general election. In a tight three-cornered fight in which he gained 31.4% of the poll, to Hudson's 35.7% and Labour's 32.9%, he fell into third place.

=== 1931 ===
Harris tried once more to re-enter the House of Commons. At the 1931 general election he fought the Wiltshire seat of Westbury. This must have seemed a winnable seat as the result at the 1929 general election had been a narrow victory for the Conservative Richard Long by just 67 votes over the Liberal Harcourt Johnstone, with Labour in third place. However, in the conditions of the 1931 general election and the crisis which had led to the formation of the National Government of Ramsay MacDonald, although neither Conservative nor Liberal candidates fought with the suffix National on their descriptions, the Tory Robert Grimston seems to have picked up the pro-government surge and won with a majority of 5,935 over Harris with Labour in third place.

Harris did not stand for Parliament again.

== Knighthood ==
Harris was knighted in the New Year Honours list of 1933 for his services to the Anti-Slavery and Aborigines Protection Society.

== Death ==
Harris died suddenly from bronchitis and a cerebral haemorrhage on 30 April 1940 in the garden of his home in Frome, aged 65 years. His death was unexpected as he had been at work only a few days before.

== Publications ==
- Coolie Labour in the British Crown Colonies and Protectorates – Edward Hughes & Co, London 1910
- Domestic Slavery in Southern Nigeria – Anti-Slavery and Aborigines Protection Society, London 1911
- Dawn in Darkest Africa – Smith, Elder & Co, London 1912
- Present Conditions in the Congo – Anti-Slavery and Aborigines Protection Society, London 1912
- Portuguese Slavery, Britain’s Dilemma – Methuen & Co, London 1913
- Germany’s Lost Colonial Empire – Simpkin, Marshall, Hamilton, London 1917
- The Greatest Land Case in British History: The Struggle for Native Rights in Rhodesia before the Judicial Committee of His Majesty’s Privy Council – Anti-Slavery and Aborigines Protection Society, London 1918
- Africa – Slave or Free? – Student Christian Movement; 1919
- The Fight for Vegetable Oils: The right of native races to sell their produce – Anti-Slavery and Aborigines Protection Society, London 1919
- The Chartered Millions: Rhodesia and the Challenge to the British Commonwealth – Swarthmore Press, London 1920
- The Mandatory System after Five Years Working – Anti-Slavery and Aborigines Protection Society, London 1925
- Slavery or Sacred Trust – Williams & Norgate, London 1926
- Freeing the Slaves – Anti-Slavery and Aborigines Protection Society, London 1926
- A Century of Emancipation – J M Dent & Sons, London 1933

Harris's unpublished autobiography can be found at the Oxford University Colonial Records Project, ref: MSS. Brit. Emp. s. 353.

Parliament of the United Kingdom
Preceded by Sir Raymond Greene	Member of Parliament for Hackney North; 1923–1924	Succeeded by Austen Hudson
