= The Baroda Crisis =

Illustrations of Malhar Rao Gaekwad and Robert Phayre in The Graphic (1875).

The Baroda Crisis was a political crisis took place in British India between 1872 and 1876 in Baroda, a 21-gun-salute Gujarati princely state.

== History ==
The crisis began when Colonel Robert Phayre was appointed as the British Resident of Baroda. He had an increasingly negative relationship with Malhar Rao Gaekwad, the Gaekwar of Baroda. This antagonism culminated in the Baroda Enquiry which found 'serious misgovernment' in the state. However, instead of taking into account the findings of the report, Thomas Baring, the Viceroy of India, instead only gave the Gaekwar a warning. This allowed the increasingly hostile relationship between Phayre and Gaekwad to develop, with Phayre increasingly unwilling to work with Rao.

The situation came to a head in November 1874. Phayre sent the Viceroy a damning report detailing the failings of the governance of the state. On the same day, the Gaekwar sent an urgent request to the Viceroy that Phayre be removed. Northbrook was sympathetic to Gaekwad and, on 12 November sent word to Bombay that Phayre should be replaced.

However, this action was taken too late as, on 9 March, an attempt was made to poison Phayre with a compound of arsenic. This led to the Gaekwar being convicted of high treason. By order of the Secretary of State for India, Robert Gascoyne-Cecil, Malhar Rao was deposed on 10 April 1875 and exiled to Madras, where he died in obscurity in 1882.

== Traditional perspective ==
Traditionally, most notably put forward by Ian Copland, the Baroda Crisis can be viewed as a demonstration of governmental rivalries of British India. 'Official warfare' had long been occurring between the existing presidencies of Bombay and Calcutta, however, the Baroda crisis intensified the conflicts. Aitchinson, the Foreign Secretary, believed that India should be more centralised, which led to Calcutta increasingly attempting to break into Bombay's sphere of influence. This was worsened by a series of reforms which meant that Bombay no longer had the power to appoint the Resident of Baroda. Bombay's poor handling of the Baroda crisis allowed Calcutta a convenient excuse to assume all of Bombay's powers.

Bombay's key failing was its indecision, which ultimately allowed the crisis to develop far more than it otherwise would have done. Phayre had been established as unfit for residency long before the crisis began, but due to the volatile political situation, he was allowed to remain. This is because, if Bombay removed Phayre, it would appear that they could not control their staff, and therefore strengthen Calcutta's case for centralisation. When Bombay finally took the decision to remove Phayre, it was far too late.

== Modern perspective ==
British historian Judith Rowbotham has put forward the view that, when looked at from a postcolonial perspective, the Baroda Crisis should primarily be viewed as a miscarriage of justice. Rowbowtham posits that rather than being tried by a jury, the Gaekwar of Baroda was convicted via an enquiry, meaning that the Raj was ultimately allowed to decide if he should be convicted. Furthermore, the Gaekwar could be found guilty under reasonable suspicion, rather than the more stringent requirements of a criminal trial. If the Gaekwar had been tried fairly, there is no doubt that the verdict would have been 'innocent'. Rowbotham argues that this verdict could then be used as a warning to princes of other states.
