= Charlotte Eliza Bousfield =

Charlotte Eliza Bousfield (born Collins, 10 July 1828 – 20 September 1933) is best known as a diarist whose writing give an extensive insight into the world and values of a middle-class Victorian lady of staunch Methodist and temperance convictions.

== Background and family ==
Charlotte Eliza Collins was born at Braunton on 10 July 1828, a daughter of Rev Robert Collins, who was a Congregationalist minister, and his wife Charlotte Eliza Cox.

After working for some years as a governess and teacher, she married Edward Tenney Bousfield (1829–1916) at Tetbury in 1853. The couple had these children:

- William Robert (1854–1943)
- Edward Collins (1855–1921)
- John Ebenezer (1858–1921)
- Charlotte Frances (1861–1951)
- Harriet Mary (1865–1942)
- Florence Jane (1869–1872)

During the first few years of his marriage, Edward went into business on his own account but this was not successful. From 1858, he held a position as an engineer at J&F Howard Ltd, a firm that manufactured agricultural machinery at Bedford.

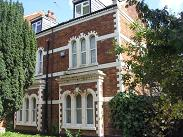
Alpha Villa, Ampthill Road, Bedford

From 1863, the Bousfield family lived at "Alpha Villa", a substantial house on the east side of Ampthill Road. Much of the family’s activities were connected with Methodism in and around Bedford. They were particularly interested in Southend Wesleyan Chapel, for which they donated land and other financial support - a building that still stands at the south corner of Ampthill Road and Offa Road. Their religious activities are recorded in many of the entries that appear in the diaries. From 1882 onwards, Charlotte was actively involved in the temperance movement. In the latter part of his life, Edward qualified as a barrister.

== Diaries ==
Charlotte began writing her diaries in the hope that they "will be profitable to myself & perhaps interesting to my children". The manuscripts cover the years 1878 to 1919 and run to some 500,000 words written in four volumes. An edited version of much of the contents of the first three of these volumes, covering part of the period when the author and her family lived at Bedford, has been published by the Bedfordshire Historical Record Society, accompanied by a scholarly introduction, biographical postscript and index.

The text of the diaries gives detailed insight into the attitudes and activities of a well-educated and reasonably prosperous woman with firmly held Methodist convictions. There is also much material about the education and evolving careers of the author's five children who survived infancy. Evidence appears on topics such as the speed and efficiency of the postal system, the importance of the by then well-developed railway system on mobility (at least for the better-off part of the population) and the limited range of opportunities then available for women. There is also some reference to domestic staff and workers.

== Later life ==
Charlotte and her husband departed from Bedford in 1903 and moved to Nottingham in order to be closer to their two surviving daughters. Edward died in 1916 but Charlotte continued her activities in temperance and other causes almost until the end of her life, delivering her last public speech in 1929. She died at Nottingham on 20 September 1933.
