= David Trustram Eve, 2nd Baron Silsoe =

The Right Honourable The Lord Silsoe QC

Member of the House of Lords
- Lord Temporal
- In office 3 December 1976 – 11 November 1999 as a hereditary peer
- Preceded by: The 1st Baron Silsoe
- Succeeded by: Seat abolished (Note: Pursuant to the House of Lords Act 1999.)

Personal details
- Born: David Malcolm Trustram Eve; 2 May 1930
- Died: 31 December 2005 (aged 75)
- Parents: Malcolm Eve, 1st Baron Silsoe; Marguerite Nanton
- Occupation: Lawyer

David Malcolm Trustram Eve, 2nd Baron Silsoe (2 May 1930 – 31 December 2005), who was known as David Silsoe, was a prominent British lawyer who succeeded to the title of Baron Silsoe in 1976 on the death of his father, Malcolm Eve, 1st Baron Silsoe. He assumed the familial title on succession; prior to that he was known by his family name, Trustram Eve.

Educated at Elm Park Preparatory School, County Armagh, Sandroyd School, Winchester College and Christ Church, Oxford, he was called to the bar in 1955. In 1963 he married Bridget Min Hart-Davis, daughter of Sir Rupert Hart-Davis and sister of Duff Hart-Davis and Adam Hart-Davis. He took silk in 1972.

Silsoe deliberately followed a career in planning law, his favoured area, rather than spending his life in law courts ("wig and gown" as he described it), an environment he did not particularly enjoy. He was leading counsel for the proposers in notable public inquiries beginning with the Thorp nuclear fuel reprocessing plant and finishing with the Heathrow Airport Terminal 5 expansion inquiry. Between the two he appeared in those for Heathrow Terminal 4, Gatwick North Terminal and Sizewell B and Hinkley Point C nuclear power stations.

Silsoe lived near Reading, Berkshire, and was an active member of the congregation at All Saints Church, Rotherfield Peppard, serving for some years on the Parochial Church Council. He was instrumental in shaping the revised Henley deanery in the late 1990s.

Lord Silsoe died in Reading, aged 75; he was succeeded in the barony by his son Simon.

Coat of arms of David Trustram Eve, 2nd Baron Silsoe
Crest Issuant from a mural coronet Or an apple tree fructed the trunk entwined by a serpent Proper. Escutcheon Sable two swords points upwards in saltire Argent pommels and hilts Or. On a chief of the second a closed book Gules garnished of the third between two torteaux. Supporters On either side a Kashmir goat Argent horned winged and gorged with a mural crown Or. Motto Eloquentia Virtus Evocant Orders Baronet of the United Kingdom

== Notes ==
Peerage of the United Kingdom
Preceded by Malcolm Trustram Eve	Baron Silsoe; 1976–2005; Member of the House of Lords (1976–1999)	Succeeded by Simon Trustram Eve
