= John Sears (British politician) =

John Sears

John Edward Sears (28 November 1857 – 20 January 1941) was a British architect and politician.

He was the son of the Reverend James Sears, a Baptist minister in Camberwell in south London, and quickly became involved in the activities of the church as a teacher and librarian. He was also the leader of the local Band of Hope temperance organisation and was associated with Baptist churches in the Peckham area. Sears was educated privately before being articled to C. G. Searle and S. C. Searle, architects, in 1872. At the same time he studied architecture at University College London and the Royal Academy Schools. He became a qualified architect in 1880 and was made a Fellow of the Royal Institute of British Architects in 1889. For several years he acted as editor of the annual Architect’s Compendium and Catalogue. He subsequently moved to Hendon in Middlesex, a northern suburb of London. He was a member of the Hendon School Board and a deacon of Hendon Baptist Church.

In 1901 Sears was elected to the London County Council as a member of the majority Progressive Party representing Hackney North. The Progressives were allied to the parliamentary Liberal Party. He became the chairman of the council's Bridges and Housing Committees. He was re-elected in 1904.

At the 1906 general election Sears was chosen by the Liberals to contest the constituency of Cheltenham. The seat had been held by the Conservative Party since the 1880s, but Sears unexpectedly unseated James Agg-Gardner, the sitting Member of Parliament. He served a single term in the Commons, and the Conservatives regained the Cheltenham seat at the next election in January 1910.

He married Selina Marianne Read and they had one son. He died at his home in Teddington in January 1941 aged 83.

Parliament of the United Kingdom
Preceded by James Agg-Gardner	Member of Parliament for Cheltenham; 1906–1910	Succeeded by Vere Ponsonby
