= 1907 London County Council election =

Local election in England

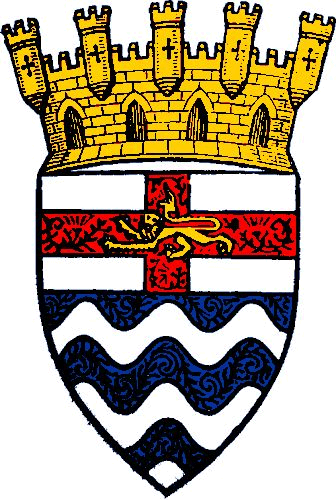
- 2 March 1907
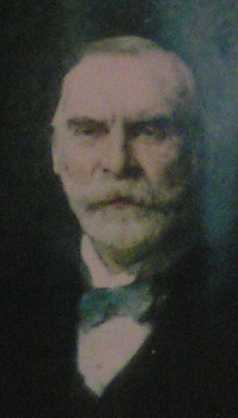

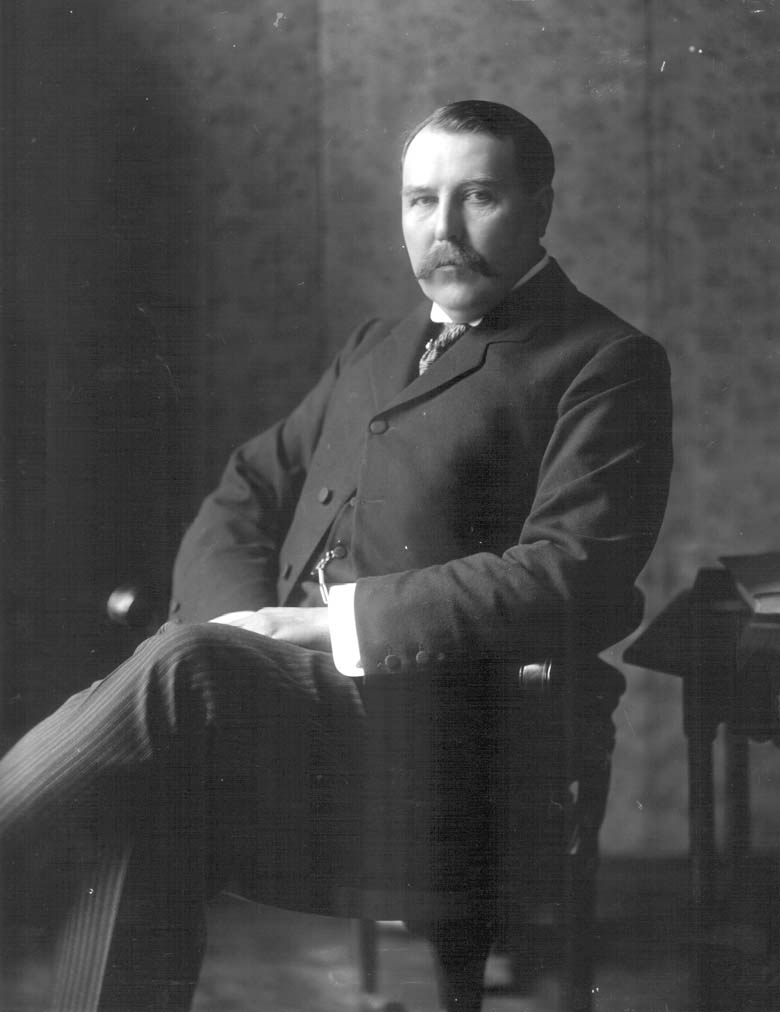
	First party	Second party
Leader	Richard Robinson	McKinnon Wood
Party	Municipal Reform	Progressive
Leader since	1906	1898
Leader's seat	Kensington South	Alderman
Last election	41 seats	95 seats
Seats won	79	38
Seat change	▲45	▼45
Popular vote	527,000	392,000

An election to the County Council of London took place on 2 March 1907. The council was elected by First Past the Post with each elector having two votes in the two-member seats. For the first time, the Progressive Party lost control of the council, being defeated by the recently formed Municipal Reform Party.

== Campaign ==
The electorate had increased by 109,934 compared with the 1904 London County Council election, as it had been determined that tenants were entitled to vote, provided that they lived in separate tenements which were not directly controlled by the landlord.

The Municipal Reform Party stood a full slate of 118 candidates, although The Times noted that only 14 of those candidates were existing councillors. There were 109 Progressive candidates, 12 Social Democratic Federation or independent socialist candidates, nine independents, eight Labour Party candidates, four independent Catholic candidates, and two Labour Progressive candidates.

== Result ==
The Municipal Reform Party won 79 seats on the council, a gain of 45 compared with the performance of the Moderates in 1904. The Progressive Party fell from 83 seats to only 38, and the only other candidate elected was an independent, who held their seat.

The Progressives blamed their defeat on high spending by the Municipal Reform Party, with the support of the Daily Mail and Daily Express and the fact that they had increased rates.

Party	Votes			Seats	
Party	Number	%	Stood	Seats	%
Municipal Reform	527,000		118	79	
Progressive	392,000		109	38	
Independent	4,900		9	1	
Social Democratic Federation	4,500		12	0	0.0
Labour			8	0	0.0
