= Herbert Trustram Eve =

British real property expert

Sir Herbert Trustram Eve KBE (1865–1936) was a noted British expert in real property.

== Biography ==
Born on 4 June 1865, Herbert Trustram Eve was educated at Bedford School. In 1893, he married Fanny Jean Turing, who later became a Conservative Party politician.

In 1904, Eve was appointed Agricultural Correspondent to the Board of Agriculture. During the First World War, he was appointed Chairman of the Forage Committee at the War Office, overseeing the requisitioning of foodstuffs for the British Army. In 1920, he was elected as President of the Farmers Club (an office held by both his father and his grandfather). He was an expert in the valuation of real property, was President of the Rating Surveyors Association, and was retained as an expert witness in several high-profile compensation cases. He would often appear in court opposite his son, the barrister Malcolm Trustram Eve, 1st Baron Silsoe. He was a frequent contributor to The Times, and his articles included an article in April 1922 entitled "Reduce the Rates," and another in April 1926 on "the Rating Act." He was keenly interested in the preservation of London's "Green Belt."

Sir Herbert Trustram Eve was invested as a Knight Commander of the Order of the British Empire in 1918. He died in London on 11 November 1936, aged 71.
