= Arnold Sorsby =

Polish-British ophthalmologist

Arnold Sorsby (born Arnold Sourasky, 10 June 1900 – 6 May 1980) was a Polish-British ophthalmologist and surgeon. In 1949, he and Mary E. Joll Mason published the first description of a rare genetic retinal dystrophy now known as Sorsby's fundus dystrophy.

== Biography ==
Sorsby was born Arnold Sourasky in Bialystock, Poland, on 10 June 1900, the brother of Max and Maurice. Around the year 1930, he changed his last name to Sorsby. He was educated at Leeds Central High School and at Leeds University in Leeds, England. He went on to serve as surgeon to the Royal Eye Hospital from 1931 to 1966, dean of the Royal Eye Hospital's Medical School from 1934 to 1938, and research professor at the Royal Eye Hospital and the Royal College of Surgeons from 1943 to 1966. He also served as editor-in-chief of the Journal of Medical Genetics from 1964 to 1969. He died on 6 May 1980.
