= Thomas Hart-Davies =

British politician

Hart-Davies

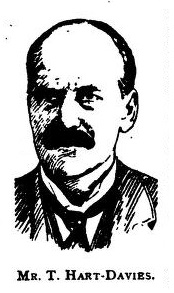

Thomas Hart-Davies (1849 – 3 January 1920) was a British colonial administrator and Liberal politician.

== Background ==
He was the son of the Venerable Thomas Hart-Davies, vicar of Christchurch, Ramsgate, Kent, and former Archdeacon of Melbourne, Australia. Following education at Marlborough College and Pembroke College, Oxford, he passed the Indian Civil Service examinations in 1867.

== Career ==
Hart-Davies served for twenty-eight years in the Bombay Presidency, mainly in the Sind Division. Over his career he was an educational inspector, manager of encumbered estates, district magistrate, judge of the Karachi District and acting Judicial Commissioner. He was viewed as a progressive administrator, joining the British Committee of the Indian National Congress and supporting the Morley-Minto Reforms.

== Politics ==
Hart-Davies returned to the United Kingdom, and became involved in Liberal politics. In 1900 he unsuccessfully stood as parliamentary candidate for the Rotherhithe constituency. He was re-selected as prospective Liberal candidate, but in 1903 he resigned the candidacy due to an eye condition. By 1905 he had recovered sufficiently to be the Liberal candidate at Hackney North. At the general election in 1906 he won the seat. He was an advocate of Land reform and Women's suffrage. He was defeated at the ensuing general election in January 1910.

Hart-Davies was a very experienced traveller: visiting Siberia, Persia and much of South America. He was estimated to have gone around the world eight times. He wrote short stories, translated a number of works from Russian to English, and was a musician and conjuror.

He died on Jersey in January 1920, aged 73.

Parliament of the United Kingdom
Preceded by William Robert Bousfield	Member of Parliament for Hackney North; 1906 – January 1910	Succeeded by Walter Raymond Greene
