= Malcolm Trustram Eve, 1st Baron Silsoe =

British barrister

Arthur Malcolm Trustram Eve, 1st Baron Silsoe GBE, MC, TD, KC (8 April 1894 – 3 December 1976), known as Sir Malcolm Trustram Eve, 1st Baronet, from 1943 to 1963, was a British barrister and First Church Estates Commissioner.

== Biography ==
Eve was the son of Sir Herbert Trustram Eve KBE (1865–1937), president of the Rating Surveyors Association, and Fanny Jean, daughter of Rev. John Robert Turing of Edwinstowe, Nottinghamshire. He was a nephew of Arthur Stewart Eve and cousin of Alan Turing. He was educated at Sandroyd School then Winchester College and Christ Church, Oxford.

== First World War ==
In the First World War he was commissioned into the Royal Welch Fusiliers and served at Gallipoli, and in Egypt and Palestine, being awarded the Military Cross and reaching the rank of captain. He was called to the Bar from the Inner Temple, in 1919, became a King's Counsel in 1935 and Master of the Bench in 1943. He was chairman of the Air Transport Licensing Authority from 1938 to 1939. He remained in the Territorial Army after the war, reaching the rank of brigadier.

== Second World War ==
In the Second World War, Eve served with the armed forces from 1939 to 1941, before being appointed chairman of the War Damage Commission (1941), War Works Commission (1945), Local Government Boundary Commission (1945) and Central Land Board (1947). He served all of these organisations until 1949.

== Post-war career ==
From 1950 to 1953 he was chairman of the Burnham Committee and in 1952-53 he was president of the European Cement Association. He was a Church Commissioner from 1949, a member of the Church Assembly from 1952, and was Third Church Estates Commissioner from 1952 to 1954. In 1954, he was appointed First Church Estates Commissioner. His other appointments included chairman of St. George's Medical School (1948), president of the Ski Club of Great Britain (1950), chairman of the Cement Makers' Federation (1951), chairman of St George's Hospital (1952) and chairman of the Road Haulage Disposal Board (1953). In 1960, he headed an enquiry into the sugar industry of Fiji, prompted by the dispute between the Federation of Cane Growers and the Colonial Sugar Refining Company (CSR).

== Baronet Silsoe ==
Eve was created a baronet, of Silsoe in the County of Bedford, in 1943, and in 1963 he was raised to the peerage as Baron Silsoe, of Silsoe in the County of Bedford.

== Personal life ==
Eve married Marguerite, daughter of Sir Augustus Meredith Nanton, in 1927 and they had twin sons, David and Peter, in May 1930. His first wife died in 1945 and he subsequently married Margaret Elizabeth, daughter of Henry Wallace Robertson of Ayton, Berwickshire.

== Death ==
Lord Silsoe died in December 1976, aged 82, and was succeeded in his titles by his elder twin son David, who also became a prominent lawyer. He, in turn, was succeeded on 31 December 2005 by his son Simon Rupert Trustram Eve (b. 17 April 1966).

== Honours ==
- Military Cross
- B. A. (Oxon), 1919
- M. A. (Oxon), 1927
- Knight Grand Cross of The Most Excellent Order of the British Empire (Civil), 1950

Coat of arms of Malcolm Trustram Eve, 1st Baron Silsoe
Crest Issuant from a mural coronet Or an apple tree fructed the trunk entwined by a serpent Proper. Escutcheon Sable two swords points upwards in saltire Argent pommels and hilts Or. On a chief of the second a closed book Gules garnished of the third between two torteaux. Supporters On either side a Kashmir goat Argent horned winged and gorged with a mural crown Or. Motto Eloquentia Virtus Evocant Orders Knight Grand Cross of the Most Excellent Order of the British Empire (not pictured); Baronet of the United Kingdom

Church of England titles
Preceded by The Lord Tovey	Third Church Estates Commissioner; 1952–1954	Succeeded by Sir James Brown
Preceded by Sir Philip Baker Wilbraham	First Church Estates Commissioner; 1954–1969	Succeeded by Sir Ronald Harris
Peerage of the United Kingdom
New creation	Baron Silsoe; 1963–1976	Succeeded by David Trustram Eve
Baronetage of the United Kingdom
New creation	Baronet (of Silsoe); 1943–1976	Succeeded by David Trustram Eve
