= William Robert Bousfield =

British politician

William Bousfield FRS KC
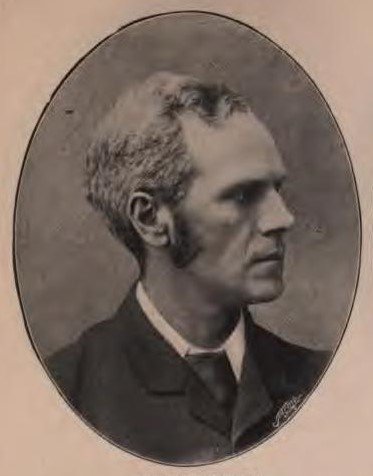
- Born: 12 January 1854; Newark-on-Trent
- Died: 16 July 1943 (aged 89); Ottery St Mary
- Education: Bedford Modern School; Caius College, Cambridge

William Robert Bousfield FRS KC (12 January 1854 – 16 July 1943) was a British lawyer, Conservative politician and scientist.

== Biography ==
Bousfield was the son of Edward Tenney Bousfield, an engineer, and his wife Charlotte Eliza Collins, who was a noted diarist. He was born at Newark-on-Trent, from which his family moved to Sticklepath in 1856 and then to Bedford, where they arrived in September 1858.

He attended Bedford Modern School before serving an apprenticeship as an engineer. In 1872 he was admitted to Gonville and Caius College, Cambridge, winning a scholarship there in 1873. Following graduation as 16th Wrangler in 1876 and a brief period as a lecturer at the University of Bristol, where he delivered the new institution's first ever lecture (on Mathematics at 9 a.m. 10 October 1876), he decided to study law. In 1880 he was called to the bar at the Inner Temple. His knowledge of engineering led to him becoming a renowned expert on patent law. He became a Queen's Counsel in 1891 (which office became King's Counsel on the accession of a King in 1901). He was elected a bencher of the Inner Temple in 1897, and treasurer in 1920.

Politically, Bousfield was a Conservative, and stood unsuccessfully twice for election as Member of Parliament for Mid Lanarkshire in the 1880s. He entered the Commons at a By-election at Hackney North in May 1892. He held the seat at the 1895 and 1900 elections, before being unseated by Thomas Hart-Davies, when the Liberals swept to power at the 1906 general election. He did not stand for election again.

Bousfield was an enthusiastic scientist, particularly interested in physical chemistry and electrolysis. He worked in collaboration with T M Lowry, and their work was published in the Proceedings of the Royal Society, of which Bousfield was made a fellow in 1916. He co-authored an article with his daughter C. Elspeth Bousfield on the specific heat of water in the Transactions of the Royal Society, published in 1919.

When his health began to fail in the 1920s, he was no longer able to carry out laboratory experiments, and turned his attention to psychology. He wrote three books on the subject: A Neglected Complex (1924), The Mind and its Mechanism (1927) and The Basis of Memory (1928). His book The Mind and its Mechanism co-authored with his son Paul Bousfield postulated the existence of a "psychoplasm" which like protoplasm is an essential part of each cell. The psychoplasm is composed of immaterial "psychons" which interact with the physical brain. Psychons are described as immeasurably smaller than electrons or protons. The book argued for a psycho-physical interaction. The "psychonic substance" is utilized to explain consciousness, ideas, memory, the unconscious mind and evolution. Bousfield favoured Lamarckian evolution, taking the view that habits become ingrained in the "mental structure" of the organism which influence the psychic structure of the germ plasm.

== Personal life ==
In 1879 he married Florence Kelly of Shanklin, Isle of Wight. His son Paul Bousfield, was a specialist in nervous diseases who graduated MRCS, LRCP from St Bartholomew's Hospital. His other son John Keith Bousfield (1893–1945), was an army officer, businessman and member of the Legislative Council of Hong Kong.

Bousfield died in Ottery St Mary in July 1943, aged 89.

== Selected publications ==
- A Neglected Complex (1924)
- The Mind and its Mechanism (with Paul Bousfield, 1927)
- The Basis of Memory (1928)

Parliament of the United Kingdom
Preceded by Sir Lewis Pelly	Member of Parliament for Hackney North; 1892 – 1906	Succeeded by Thomas Hart-Davies
