= Sir Austin Hudson, 1st Baronet =

British Conservative politician (1897–1956)

Sir Austin Uvedale Morgan Hudson, 1st Baronet (6 February 1897 – 29 November 1956) was a Conservative Party politician in the United Kingdom.

== Early life ==
Austin Uvedale Morgan Hudson was born on the 6 February 1897 to surgeon Leopold Hudson. He went to school at Eton before attending the Royal Military College, Sandhurst. He served with the Guards machine-gun regiment from 1915 until 1920.

== Political life ==
Hudson was first elected at the 1922 general election as Member of Parliament (MP) for Islington East, but lost the seat at the 1923 election. He returned to Parliament at the 1924 general election when he won the Hackney North seat from the Liberal Party MP John Harris. He held that seat until the Labour landslide at the 1945 general election, when he lost by a large margin to Labour's Henry Goodrich. Hudson was returned to the House of Commons at the 1950 general election for the new Lewisham North, representing the seat until his death.

In Ramsay MacDonald's National Government 1931–1935 Hudson was appointed Lord of the Treasury (i.e., a government whip), and in the second National Government he was Parliamentary Secretary to the Ministry of Transport from 1935 to 1939, and then Civil Lord of the Admiralty from 1939 to 1940. Hudson was reappointed to the Admiralty in Winston Churchill's war-time coalition, but he left the government in March 1942. He returned to office briefly in 1945, as Parliamentary Secretary to the Minister of Fuel and Power in Churchill's 1945 caretaker government which held office from May to July that year.

== Personal life ==
In 1930, Hudson married Margaret (Peggy) Broadbent, daughter of Harold Broadbent and Hilda, Viscountess Dillon. The couple had no children.

Hudson was made a baronet in July 1942, of North Hackney, in the County of Middlesex. Hudson was chairman of Morgan Brothers (Publishers). Ltd., a governor of Westminster hospital and an honorary treasurer of the National Association for the Prevention of Tuberculosis.

On 29 November 1956, after several weeks as a patient in Westminster Hospital, Hudson died aged 59. A memorial service was held at St Martin-in-the-Fields church on 14 December 1956.

His widow, Margaret, was an early employer of Archibald Hall, a known serial murderer and thief.

Parliament of the United Kingdom
Preceded by Alfred Raper	Member of Parliament for Islington East; 1922 – 1923	Succeeded by Arthur Comyns Carr
Preceded by John Harris	Member of Parliament for Hackney North; 1924 – 1945	Succeeded by Henry Edwin Goodrich
New constituency	Member of Parliament for Lewisham North; 1950 – 1956	Succeeded by Niall MacDermot
Political offices
Vacant Title last held by Cuthbert Headlam, to 1934	Parliamentary Secretary to the Ministry of Transport; 1935–1939	Succeeded by Robert Bernays
Preceded by Sir John Llewellin, Bt	Civil Lord of the Admiralty; 1939–1942	Succeeded by Sir Richard Pilkington
Baronetage of the United Kingdom
New creation	Baronet of North Hackney, Middlesex; 1942–1956	Extinct
