= Henry Edwin Goodrich =

British Labour politician

Henry Edwin Goodrich (6 April 1887 – 13 April 1961) was a British Labour politician.

Goodrich was originally employed as a policeman. In 1919 he was general secretary of National Union of Police and Prison Officers. His part in organising a police strike made him one of 2,442 police officers dismissed.

In 1926 he was elected to represent the Clapton Park ward on Hackney Borough Council, becoming the only Labour councillor on the council which was controlled by the Liberal and Conservative backed Progressive Reform Party.

In 1931 he stood as Labour Party candidate for Hackney North at the elections to London County Council, but failed to be elected. Later in the year he lost his seat on Hackney council.

In 1934 elections to the London County Council were again held, and the Labour Party swept to power. Goodrich was elected to the council, representing Hackney North. Elections to the metropolitan borough councils were held in November of the same year, and Labour seized control of 15 boroughs, including Hackney. Goodrich was elected to the borough council, subsequently made an alderman, and in 1935-1936 was mayor of Hackney. He was re-elected to the LCC in 1937, when Labour increased their majority.

At the 1945 general election he was elected as Member of Parliament for Hackney North, winning the seat from the Conservatives. He only served one term in the Commons, retiring due to ill-health in 1950.

In later life the Hackney Metropolitan Borough recorded Alderman Goodrich as being a J.P., Justice of the Peace.

He died in Hackney in April 1961, aged 74.

Parliament of the United Kingdom
Preceded by Capt Sir Austin Hudson	Member of Parliament for Hackney North; 1945 – 1950	Constituency abolished
