= Baron Silsoe =

Barony in the Peerage of the United Kingdom

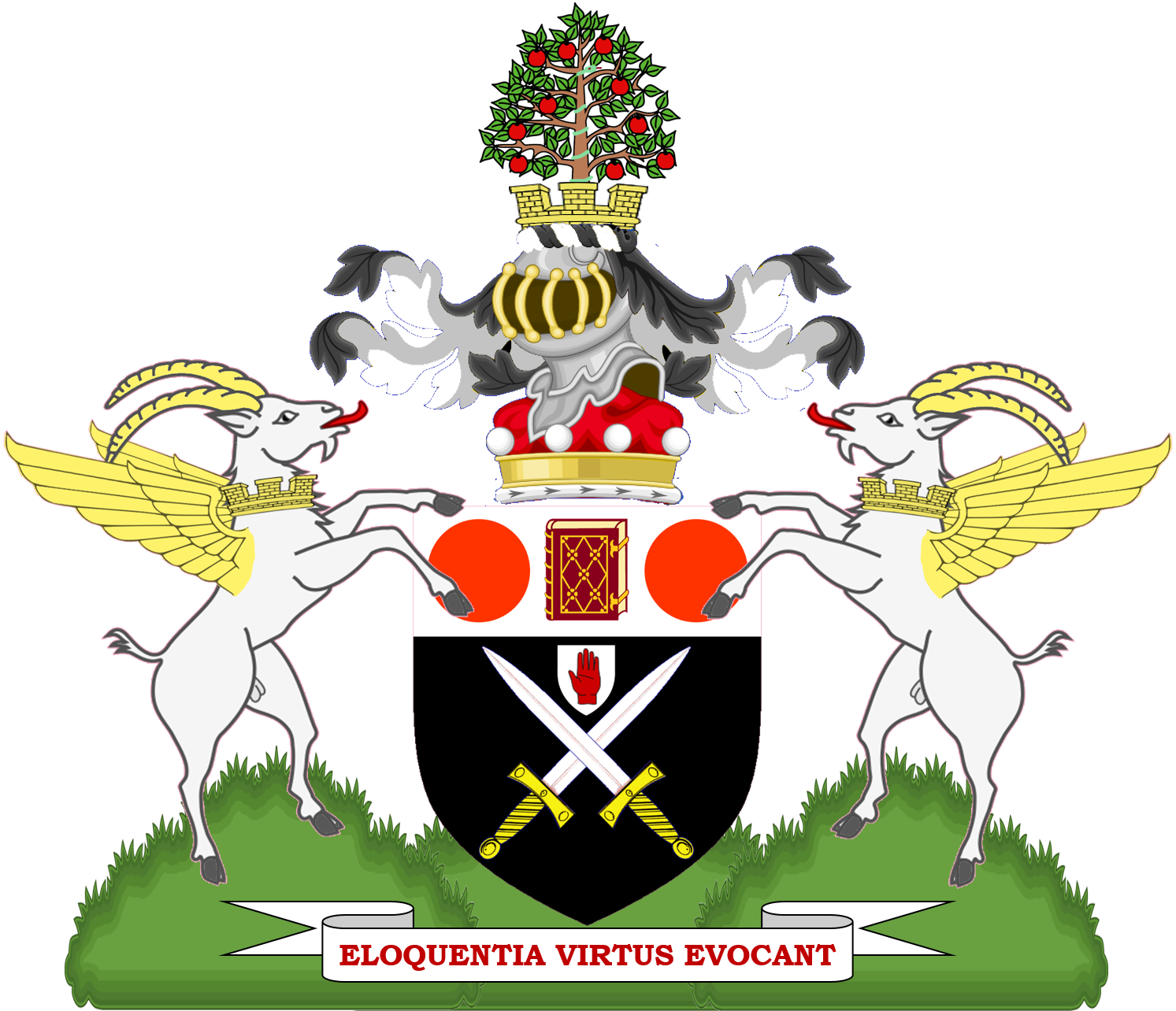
- Crest: Issuant from a mural coronet Or, an apple tree fructed, the trunk entwined by a serpent Proper.
- Shield: Sable two swords points upwards in saltire Argent pommels and hilts Or. On a chief of the second, a closed book Gules garnished of the third between two torteaux.
- Supporters: On either side, a Kashmir goat, Argent horned, winged, and gorged with a mural crown Or.
- Motto: Eloquentia Virtus Evocant

Baron Silsoe, of Silsoe in the County of Bedford, is a title in the Peerage of the United Kingdom. It was created on 18 January 1963 for the barrister Sir Malcolm Trustram Eve, 1st Baronet. He had already been made a Baronet, of Silsoe in the County of Bedford, on 18 January 1943. His son, the second Baron, succeeded him. Known as David Silsoe, he was also a barrister. As of 2017, the titles are held by his son Simon, the third Baron, who succeeded in 2005.

Silsoe is a town in Bedfordshire.

The family seat is Neal's Farm, near Reading, Berkshire.

== Baron Silsoe (1963) ==
- Arthur Malcolm Trustram Eve, 1st Baron Silsoe (1894–1976)
  - David Malcolm Trustram Eve, 2nd Baron Silsoe (1930–2005)
    - Simon Rupert Trustram Eve, 3rd Baron Silsoe (b. 1966)
  - Hon. Peter Nanton Trustram Eve (1930–2023)
    - (1) Richard Malcolm Jannion Trustram Eve (b. 1963)
      - (2) Alexander Christopher Peter Trustram Eve (b. 1993)
      - (3) James Arthur Richard Trustram Eve (b. 1996)
    - (4) Nicholas Dominic Peter Trustram Eve (b. 1965)

The heir presumptive is his first cousin, Richard Malcolm Jannion Trustram Eve (born 1963), the son of the Hon. Peter Nanton Trustram Eve (1930–2023), the younger son of the 1st Baron Silsoe, and twin brother of the 2nd Baron.
