= Journal of Medical Genetics =

- Discipline: Medical genetics
- Language: English
- Edited by: Huw Dorkins

Publication details
- History: 1964–present
- Publisher: BMJ Group
- Frequency: Monthly
- Impact factor: 3.4 (2025)

Standard abbreviations
- ISO 4: J. Med. Genet.

Indexing
- CODEN: JMDGAE
- ISSN: 0022-2593 (print); 1468-6244 (web)
- LCCN: sn80001279
- OCLC no.: 01640533

Links
- Journal homepage; Online access; Online archive

The Journal of Medical Genetics is a monthly peer-reviewed medical journal covering all aspects of medical genetics, including reviews of and opinion on the latest developments. It was established in 1964 and is published by the BMJ Group. The editor-in-chief is Huw Dorkins (University of Oxford).

== Abstracting and indexing ==
The journal is abstracted and indexed in the Science Citation Index, BIOSIS Previews, Index Medicus/MEDLINE, Current Contents, Scopus, Embase, and CINAHL. According to the Journal Citation Reports, the journal has a 2024 impact factor of 3.7.
