= Fanny Jean Turing =

British politician

- Born: Jean Trustram Turing; 6 July 1862; Cambridge, Cambridgeshire, England
- Died: 1 February 1934 (aged 71)
- Known for: Conservative Party

Fanny Jean Turing (1862 – 1 February 1934), Lady Trustram Eve, was a British politician.

== Life ==
Turing was born on 6 July 1862 in Cambridge. She married Herbert Trustram Eve in 1893, and the couple settled in London. There, she became active in the Conservative Party.

During World War I, Turing chaired the London and Middlesex Women's Land Army, and chaired the Women's Agricultural Federation for a year from 1918. From 1917 until 1928, she chaired the Conservative Women's Reform Association, which campaigned for modest social reforms in line with Conservative Party policy.

At the 1919 London County Council election, Turing was elected to represent Hackney North; she was re-elected in 1922, then switched to Kensington South in 1925, and held that seat until she stood down in 1931. From 1921 until 1931, she also served as treasurer of the National Council of Women of Great Britain (NCW), and served as its president in 1933. She was supportive of the Electrical Association for Women, chairing an early meeting of the organisation.

Turing was also active in the Church of England, serving in the Church Assembly from 1925 to 1930.

Turing's son, Malcolm Trustram Eve, was a noted barrister.
