= Sir Raymond Greene, 2nd Baronet =

British politician

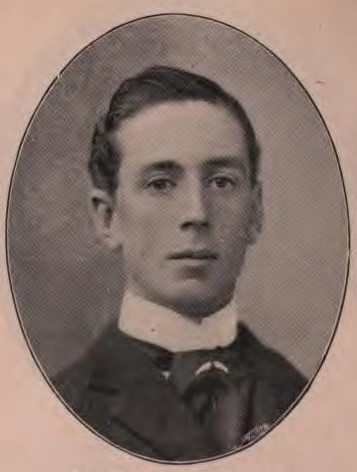
Greene in 1895.

Sir Walter Raymond Greene, 2nd Baronet, DSO (4 August 1869 – 24 August 1947) was a British Conservative politician.

He was the second son of Edward Greene (later Sir Edward Greene, 1st Baronet) of Nether Hall, Suffolk and Anne Elizabeth née Royds of Haughton, Staffordshire. Following education at Eton College and Oriel College, Oxford, he entered politics at the 1895 general election as Member of Parliament for the Western or Chesterton Division of Cambridgeshire.

He held a commission as lieutenant in the Suffolk Yeomanry from 1893, and left with his regiment in January 1900 to serve in the Second Boer War in South Africa. The following month he was on 7 February commissioned a lieutenant in the Imperial Yeomanry. He was promoted to captain in the Suffolk Yeomanry on 14 October 1900.

The 1900 general election was held while he was on active service in South Africa, and he was re-elected in his absence. He lost the seat at the next election in 1906, when the Liberal Party came to power in an electoral landslide.

In 1907 he was elected to the London County Council as a member of the Conservative-backed Municipal Reform Party, representing the Hackney North area. Three years later he became MP for the same constituency at the January 1910 general election, defeating the sitting Liberal MP by 847 votes. He was elected chairman of the London County Council housing committee in the same year.

Greene served on the western front throughout the First World War. He initially served with the 9th Queen's Royal Lancers, winning the Distinguished Service Order (DSO). He later commanded the 2/3rd County of London Yeomanry (Sharpshooters), before ending the war as a staff officer.

Following the war he successfully defended his parliamentary seat in 1918. On the death of his father in 1920, he succeeded to the baronetcy, his elder brother having died as a child. He was elected as Hackney North's MP for a third time in 1922, but was defeated when a further election was held in 1923. He did not stand for election again.

Raymond Greene never married, and died in 1947, aged 78. The baronetcy passed to his younger brother, Edward.

== Arms ==
Coat of arms of Sir Raymond Greene, 2nd Baronet

Crest
In front of an eagle's head erased Or holding in the beak a sprig of three trefoils slipped Vert two annulets interlaced Azure between as many bezants.
Escutcheon
Argent on a cross indented Gules two annulets interlaced between four crescents Or a chief Azure thereon between two bezants a pale of the third charged with a crescent of the fourth.
Motto
Non Sine Numine

Parliament of the United Kingdom
Preceded by Hugh Hoare	Member of Parliament for Chesterton; 1895 – 1906	Succeeded by Edwin Montagu
Preceded by Thomas Hart-Davies	Member of Parliament for Hackney North; January 1910 – 1923	Succeeded by John Harris
Baronetage of the United Kingdom
Preceded by Edward Greene	Baronet (of Nether Hall); 1920–1947	Succeeded by Edward Allen Greene
