= Max Sorsby =

Russian-born British doctor and politician

Max Sorsby (December 1907 – 8 June 1975) was a Russian-born British doctor and politician.

Born into a Jewish family in Białystok, then part of Russia, Sorsby was the son of Jacob Souransky, and brother of Arnold and Maurice. The family moved to Antwerp, and then when Max was seven, they moved to Leeds in England. He studied medicine at the University of Leeds, King's College London, and Charing Cross Hospital, qualifying in 1933. He then became a general practitioner in Hackney, known for his interest in the social conditions of patients, and for sometimes conducting his clinics in Yiddish.

Sorsby joined the Labour Party, and was elected to Hackney Metropolitan Borough Council in 1937, serving until 1949, chairing the council's maternity and child welfare committee. At the 1946 London County Council election, he was elected in Hackney North, standing down in 1949, when the seats were reorganised. He also chaired the Hackney Technical Institute.

In 1947, Sorsby was appointed as physician in charge of the Jewish outpatients department of the Metropolitan Free Hospital. He served on the General Medical Services Committee from 1950, chairing its mental health sub-committee, and in 1959 he was appointed to the newly formed General Optical Council. In 1961, he was elected as chair of the Inner London Medical Committee. In addition, he was a founder of the Royal College of General Practitioners, and of the London Jewish Hospital Medical Society, which he served for many years as secretary and then as president.

In 1953, Sorsby was the editor of The National Health Service: a Guide for Practitioners. In 1972, the Sorsby Medical Centre was named after him, and Sorsby worked there for his final year before retirement. Having suffered regular ill health, he died in 1975.
