= Hackney North =

Parliamentary constituency in the United Kingdom, 1885–1950

- Former borough constituency for the House of Commons

1885–1950
- Seats: one
- Created from: Hackney
- Replaced by: Stoke Newington and Hackney North

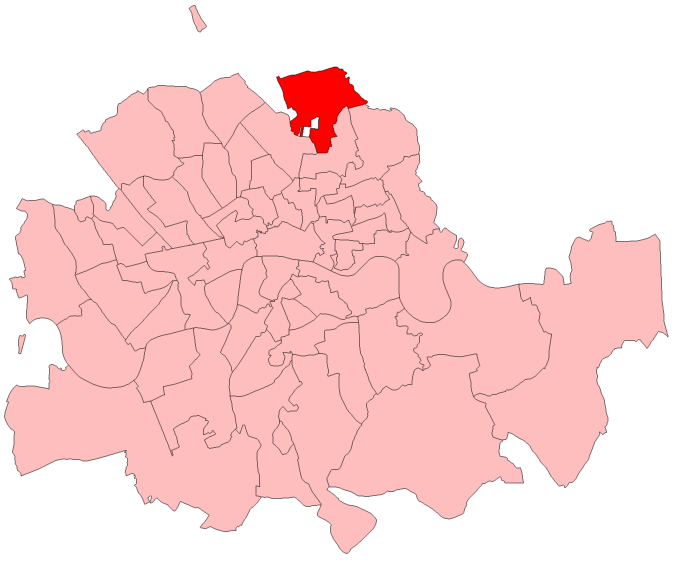
Hackney North in London 1885-1918

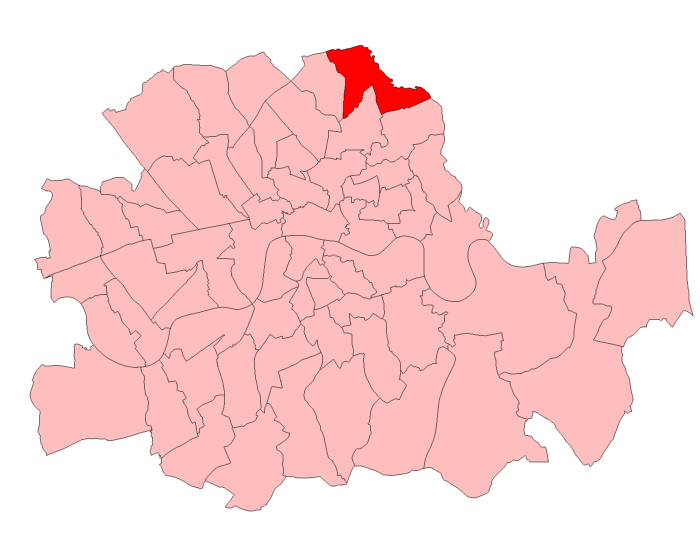
Hackney North in London 1918-50

Hackney North was a parliamentary constituency in "The Metropolis" (later the County of London). It returned one Member of Parliament (MP) to the House of Commons of the Parliament of the United Kingdom.

== History ==
Elections have been held here since Simon de Montfort's Parliament in 1265 for the county constituency of Middlesex.

Under the Reform Act 1832 and from then onward, Hackney formed part of the new parliamentary borough of Tower Hamlets. This much larger area than today's borough with that name was only divided with the creation of the two seat constituency of Hackney at the 1868 general election, comprising the large parishes of Bethnal Green and Shoreditch. This was a creation of the Second Reform Act or the officially termed Representation of the People Act 1867. Hackney's increased democratic representation provided suffrage for the first time to working-class men but was originally intended to increase the number of seats held in the House of Commons by the Conservative Party.

The constituency was created under the Redistribution of Seats Act 1885 when the two-member Parliamentary Borough of Hackney was split into three single-member divisions. The seat, officially the Northern Division of the Parliamentary Borough of Hackney was first contested at the 1885 general election. The constituency was abolished under the Representation of the People Act 1948 for the 1950 general election, when it was largely replaced by the new Hackney North and Stoke Newington constituency.

== Boundaries ==

=== 1885–1918 ===
In 1885 the constituency was defined as consisting of:

- The Parish of Stoke Newington (previously part of the Parliamentary Borough of Finsbury)
- No. 1 or Stamford Hill Ward of Hackney Parish
- No. 2 or West Hackney Ward of Hackney Parish
- The part of No. 5 or Hackney Ward of Hackney Parish north of the centres of Evering Road, Upper Clapton Road, and Southwold Road.

=== 1918–1950 ===
The Representation of the People Act 1918 redrew constituencies throughout Great Britain and Ireland. Seats in the County of London were redefined in terms of wards of the Metropolitan Boroughs that had been created in 1900. The Metropolitan Borough of Hackney was divided into three divisions, with the same names as the constituencies created in 1885. Hackney North was defined as consisting of :

- Stamford Hill Ward
- The part of Clapton Park Ward to the north of a line drawn along the centres of Glenarm Road, Glyn Road and Redwald Road to its junction with Maclaren Street, thence across the recreation grounds in Daubeney Road to the borough boundary at a point fifty feet north of a boundary post situate at the junction of the Waterworks River with the River Lea at Lead Mill Point.
- The part of West Hackney Ward to the north and west of the centre of Shacklewell Lane.

Stoke Newington was removed from the seat, and became a separate constituency.

=== Redistribution ===
The constituency was abolished by the Representation of the People Act 1948. The Borough of Hackney and Stoke Newington jointly formed two seats, Stoke Newington and Hackney North and Hackney South. The bulk of Hackney North passed to the Stoke Newington and Hackney North seat.

== Members of Parliament ==
Election	Member	Party
1885	Sir Lewis Pelly	Conservative
1892 by-election	William Robert Bousfield	Conservative
1906	Thomas Hart-Davies	Liberal
1910	Walter Greene	Conservative
1923	Hobbis Harris	Liberal
1924	Sir Austin Hudson	Conservative
1945	Henry Edwin Goodrich	Labour
1950	constituency abolished	

== Elections ==
=== Elections in the 1880s ===
General election 1885: Hackney North
Party	Candidate	Votes	%	±%
Conservative	Lewis Pelly	3,327	53.3	
Liberal	Æneas McIntyre	2,911	46.7	
Majority		416	6.6	
Turnout		6,238	77.4	
Registered electors		8,058		
Conservative win (new seat)				

General election 1886: Hackney North
Party	Candidate	Votes	%	±%
Conservative	Lewis Pelly	3,351	64.5	+11.2
Liberal	William Hickman Smith Aubrey	1,848	35.5	−11.2
Majority		1,503	28.9	+22.3
Turnout		5,199	64.5	−12.9
Registered electors		8,058		
Conservative hold		Swing	+11.2	

=== Elections in the 1890s ===
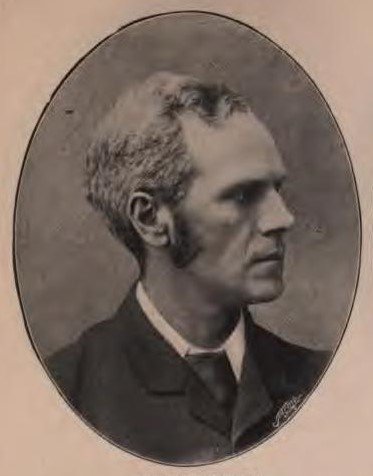
Bousfield

1892 Hackney North by-election
Party	Candidate	Votes	%	±%
Conservative	William Bousfield	4,460	56.1	−8.4
Liberal	Thomas Arrowsmith Meates	3,491	43.9	+8.4
Majority		969	12.2	−16.7
Turnout		7,951	79.0	+14.5
Registered electors		10,060		
Conservative hold		Swing	-8.4	

General election 1892: Hackney South
Party	Candidate	Votes	%	±%
Conservative	William Bousfield	4,799	59.4	−5.1
Liberal	John M McCall	3,280	40.6	+5.1
Majority		1,519	18.8	−10.1
Turnout		8,079	80.3	+15.8
Registered electors		10,060		
Conservative hold		Swing	−5.1	

General election 1895: Hackney North
Party	Candidate	Votes	%	±%
Conservative	William Bousfield	4,725	65.8	+6.4
Liberal	Sylvain Mayer	2,460	34.2	−6.4
Majority		2,265	31.6	+12.8
Turnout		7,185	62.8	−17.5
Registered electors		11,444		
Conservative hold		Swing	+6.4	

=== Elections in the 1900s ===
General election 1900: Hackney North
Party	Candidate	Votes	%	±%
Conservative	William Bousfield	5,005	67.3	+1.5
Liberal	Herbert Wilberforce	2,437	32.7	−1.5
Majority		2,568	34.6	+3.0
Turnout		7,442	63.4	+0.6
Registered electors		11,747		
Conservative hold		Swing	+1.5	

Hart-Davies

General election 1906: Hackney North
Party	Candidate	Votes	%	±%
Liberal	Thomas Hart-Davies	4,655	51.2	+18.5
Conservative	William Bousfield	4,431	48.8	−18.5
Majority		224	2.4	N/A
Turnout		9,086	80.2	+16.8
Registered electors		11,334		
Liberal gain from Conservative		Swing	+18.5	

=== Elections in the 1910s ===
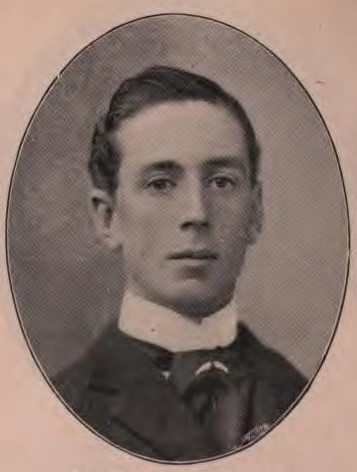
Greene

General election January 1910: Hackney North
Party	Candidate	Votes	%	±%
Conservative	Walter Greene	5,620	54.1	+21.3
Liberal	Thomas Hart-Davies	4,773	45.9	−21.3
Majority		847	8.2	N/A
Turnout		10,393	88.2	+8.0
Conservative gain from Liberal		Swing	+21.4	

General election December 1910: Hackney North
Party	Candidate	Votes	%	±%
Conservative	Walter Greene	5,290	56.2	+2.1
Liberal	William Arthur Addinsell	4,126	43.8	−2.1
Majority		1,164	12.4	+4.2
Turnout		9,416	79.9	−8.3
Conservative hold		Swing	+2.1	

General election 14 December 1918: Hackney North
Party		Candidate	Votes	%	±%
C	Unionist	Walter Greene	9,873	70.6	+14.4
	Liberal	Wright Burrows	4,119	29.4	−14.4
Majority			5,754	41.2	+28.8
Turnout			13,992	50.2	−29.7
Registered electors			27,871		
	Unionist hold		Swing	+14.4	
C indicates candidate endorsed by the coalition government.

=== Elections in the 1920s ===
General election 1922: Hackney North
Party	Candidate	Votes	%	±%
Unionist	Walter Greene	13,002	60.8	−9.8
Liberal	Philip Guedalla	8,387	39.2	+9.8
Majority		4,615	21.6	−19.6
Turnout		21,389	63.5	+13.3
Registered electors		33,706		
Unionist hold		Swing	−9.8	

Hobbis Harris

General election 1923: Hackney North
Party	Candidate	Votes	%	±%
Liberal	John Harris	11,177	54.0	+14.8
Unionist	Walter Greene	9,523	46.0	−14.8
Majority		1,654	8.0	N/A
Turnout		20,700	61.2	−2.3
Registered electors		33,825		
Liberal gain from Unionist		Swing	+14.8	

General election 1924: Hackney North
Party	Candidate	Votes	%	±%
Unionist	Austin Hudson	11,975	47.5	+1.5
Liberal	John Harris	7,181	28.4	−25.6
Labour	Stella Churchill	6,097	24.1	New
Majority		4,794	19.1	N/A
Turnout		25,253	74.2	+13.0
Registered electors		34,012		
Unionist gain from Liberal		Swing	+12.9	

General election 1929: Hackney North
Party	Candidate	Votes	%	±%
Unionist	Austin Hudson	11,199	35.7	−11.8
Labour	Frank Bowles	10,333	32.9	+8.8
Liberal	John Harris	9,844	31.4	+3.0
Majority		866	2.8	−16.3
Turnout		31,376	68.6	−5.6
Registered electors		45,722		
Unionist hold		Swing	−10.3	

=== Elections in the 1930s ===
General election 1931: Hackney North
Party	Candidate	Votes	%	±%
Conservative	Austin Hudson	20,545	69.5	+33.8
Labour	Frank Bowles	9,022	30.5	−2.4
Majority		11,523	38.9	+36.1
Turnout		29,567		
Conservative hold		Swing		

General election 1935: Hackney North
Party	Candidate	Votes	%	±%
Conservative	Austin Hudson	15,000	51.9	−17.6
Labour	Frank Bowles	13,920	48.1	+17.6
Majority		1,080	3.8	−35.1
Turnout		28,920		
Conservative hold		Swing		

=== Elections in the 1940s ===
General election 1945: Hackney North
Party	Candidate	Votes	%	±%
Labour	Henry Goodrich	17,337	65.0	+16.9
Conservative	Austin Hudson	5,771	21.7	−30.2
Liberal	Doreen Gorsky	3,546	13.3	New
Majority		11,566	43.3	N/A
Turnout		26,654		
Labour gain from Conservative		Swing		
