= Baroda Residency =

Residency of British India

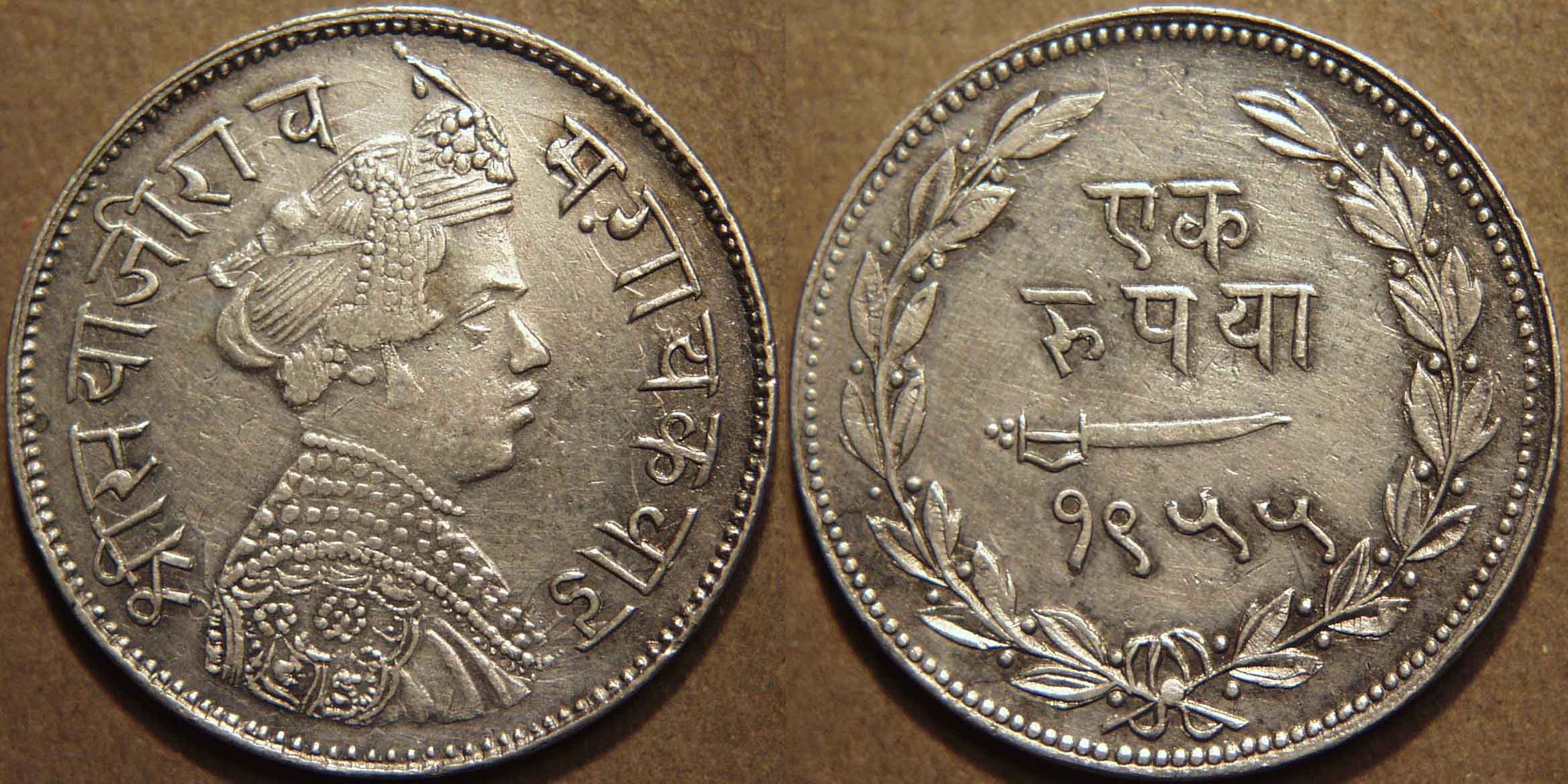
Silver rupee of Sayaji Rao III, late 19th century

The Baroda Residency was one of the residencies of British India, managing the relations of the British with Baroda State between 1806 and the 1930s.

Baroda was an Indian princely state, ruled by the Gaekwad dynasty from its formation in 1721. Following the Second Anglo-Maratha War of 1803–1805, the Gaekwads of Baroda made peace with the British, entering into a subsidiary alliance which acknowledged British suzerainty and control of the state's external affairs in return for retaining internal autonomy.

With wealth coming from the lucrative cotton trade as well as rice, wheat and sugar, it was one of the largest and richest of the hundreds of princely states existing alongside British India. It was thus one of the states which had a British Resident appointed to deal with no other princely state.

In 1937, the princely states of the Baroda Residency, which in between had become the Baroda Agency, were merged with those of the agencies adjacent to the northern part of the Bombay Presidency —Rewa Kantha Agency, Surat Agency, Nasik Agency, Kaira Agency and Thana Agency— in order to form the Baroda and Gujarat States Agency. On 5 November 1944, the Baroda and Gujarat States Agency was merged with the Western India States Agency (WISA) to form the larger Baroda, Western India and Gujarat States Agency. The autonomy of the state ended in 1949 when it acceded to the newly formed Union of India.

== See also ==
- Baroda State
- Baroda
