= Richard Robinson (Municipal Reform politician) =

British politician (1849–1928)

Sir Richard Robinson DL JP
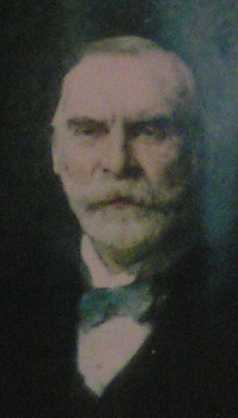
- Portrait of Richard Atkinson Robinson by William Quiller Orchardson
- Born: 16 October 1849; Whitby, England
- Died: 28 April 1928 (aged 78)
- Occupations: Chemist, druggist

Sir Richard Atkinson Robinson DL JP (16 October 1849 – 28 April 1928) was a British retail chemist and druggist who later became a local politician, and was the first member of the Municipal Reform Party (linked to the Conservatives) to lead the London County Council (1907–1908).

== Early life ==
He was the eldest son of a family engaged in the owning and operating of sailing ships in Whitby. His father died when he was 18, and with four sisters and four younger brothers, there was no money for expensive higher education.

He apprenticed himself to a chemist and druggist in Bootle, migrating to a Kensington firm in 1870 and qualifying for registration in 1872. The firm's owner died and he bought it, going on to acquire also a shop in Tunbridge Wells and later a fashionable pharmacy near St. James's Palace.

As a chemist and druggist, he could not become a full member of the Pharmaceutical Society, but in 1898 he and others in the same position became able to do so under an amending Act of Parliament which he had actively promoted. He subsequently became a member of the society's council and served as president in 1904–1907. He was instrumental in securing the drafting and adoption of compulsory poison regulations in 1899.

== Local government ==
He was always active in local affairs. He became chairman of the Tunbridge Wells Tradesmen's Association and was a Town Councillor there; an Alderman in Kensington; a Deputy Lieutenant in the County of London and a Justice of the Peace both there and in the North Riding of Yorkshire; a Governor of the Imperial College of Science; a member of the board of the Thames Conservancy; an Income Tax Commissioner, and a cofounder and first chairman of the Society of Yorkshiremen in London. He turned down the mayoralties of both Tunbridge Wells and Kensington.

He was also elected to the London County Council as one of the "Moderates" (linked to the Conservatives) who opposed the "Progressive" (linked to the Liberals) majority. He served as deputy chairman of the council in 1903–04, and was leader of the "Municipal Reform Party" (the more active title assumed by the Moderates) in 1907 when, in a bitterly fought election, they won a remarkable majority against what they denounced as the Progressives' extravagance and wastefulness. After forming the first Municipal Reform administration, he served as chairman of the council in 1908–09. He was knighted in 1916, the first time that (as a result of the formation of the wartime coalition government) the Conservative Party could honour the success he had helped to achieve in 1907.

== Later life ==
During the First World War, he retired from business, serving as vice-chairman of the London Tribunal on Profiteering. In 1920 he moved back to Whitby where he became chairman of the urban district council.

== Family ==
In 1876 he married Jane Thistle of another Whitby family, and in 1926 they celebrated their golden wedding anniversary, as her parents and grandparents and his grandparents had done and as one of their sons and four of their grandchildren did later. He helped his children get better education than he had done and all his sons attended university or took equivalent professional qualifications, while his eldest daughter Alice, later Lady Bottomley, graduated at the London School of Economics and lectured there before the First World War. His daughter Barbara married Reginald Campbell Thompson (21 August 1876 – 23 May 1941) British archaeologist, Assyriologist and cuneiformist. He excavated at Nineveh, Ur, Nebo, Carchemish and other sites, digging with T E Lawrence before the Great War and Max Mallowan with Agatha Christie afterwards. His daughter Hilda married the notable doctor Sir Stanley Woodwark whose son George was one of the medical students at the relief of Bergen Belsen.

His grandson, through his daughter Alice, was diplomat Sir James Bottomley. His great grandchildren include Sir Peter Bottomley. His great great grandchildren include Baroness Ussher.

== Death ==
He died on 28 April 1928 in Whitby, survived by his widow, three daughters and two sons. (Two other sons predeceased him, having been killed in action during WWI.)

Political offices
Preceded by Henry Percy Harris	Chairman of the London County Council; 1908–1909	Succeeded by Sir Melvill Beachcroft
