= A. E. Morgan =

A. E. Morgan may refer to:

- Arthur Ernest Morgan (1878–1975), American administrator, educator and engineer
- Arthur Eustace Morgan (1886–1972) British professor of English and principal of University College Hull and McGill University
