= Henry Gillett =

Henry Tregelles Gillett (1872–1955) was an English physician and Mayor of Oxford. He was an activist in the Society of Friends, and a founder of Oxfam.

== Life ==
He was the third son of Charles Gillett of Woodgreen, Banbury and his wife Gertrude Mary Tregelles, daughter of Edwin Octavius Tregelles; the banker Joseph Ashby Gillett was his grandfather. He won an entrance scholarship to St Bartholomew's Hospital in 1891. He qualified as a physician in 1895, and the same year became a member of the Royal College of Surgeons.

Gillett undertook a further medical course in Edinburgh, and went into practice there in 1898. He later moved to Oxford as a general practitioner, taking over the 15 King Edward Street medical office, where Dr. Robert Thomas Jenkins had worked in 1903. In 1915, he supplied Arnold J. Toynbee with a second medical opinion that allowed Toynbee to be excused military service. In 1916, he wrote to the Oxford Times in support of the work as voluntary tuberculosis officer being done by Dr. Mary Carew Hunt.

From around 1920, Gillett had as assistant Eric Clark Hinde (died 1925), a conscientious objector of World War I who had served with the Friends Ambulance Unit. He retired as a general practitioner in 1935. The practice at 15 King Edward Street was taken over by Gerald Joseph Wyld McMichael, and Kenneth H. Southall of the Friends Ambulance Unit.

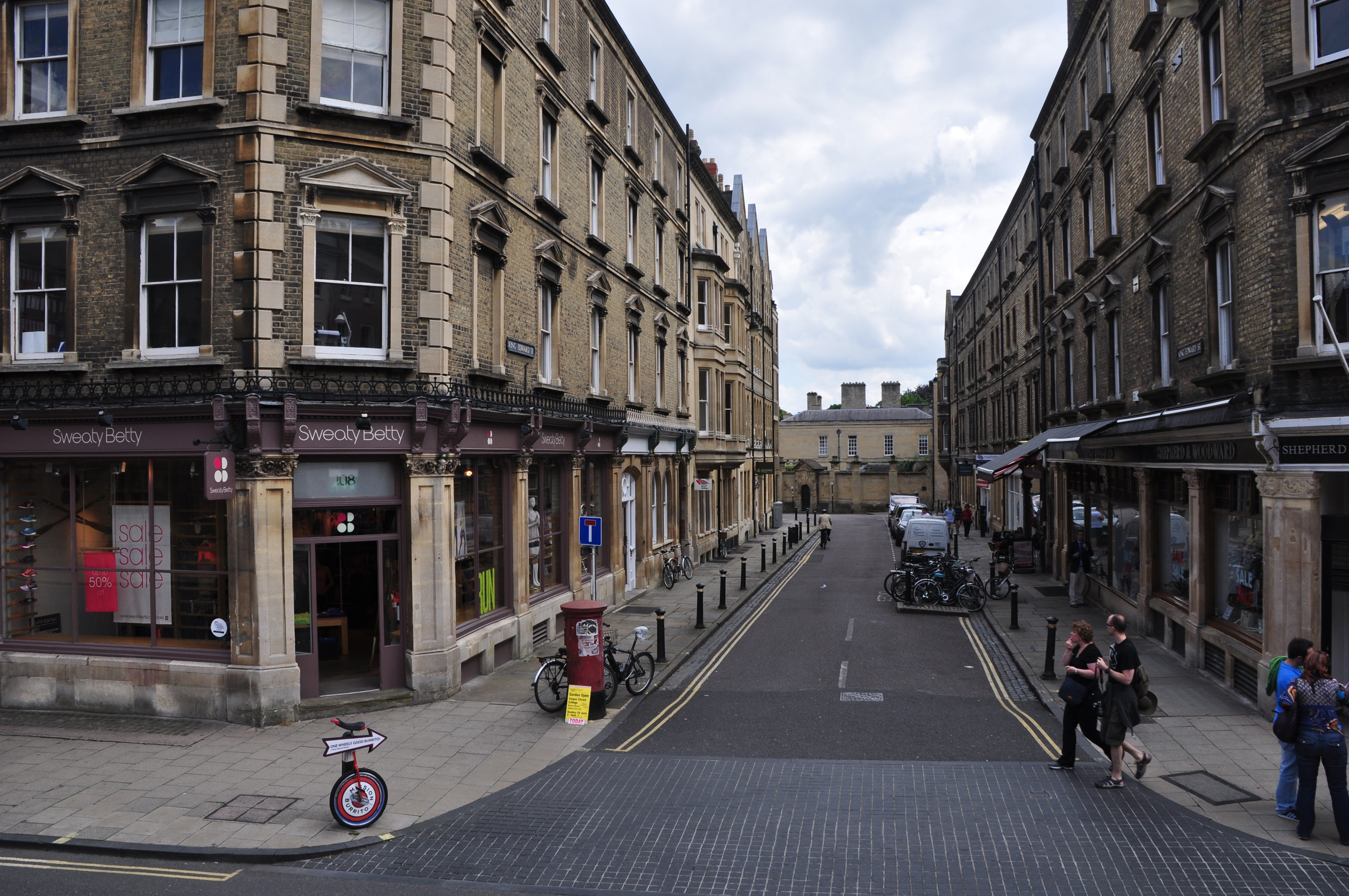
King Edward Street, Oxford, 2014 photograph

== Local politics ==
Gillett was a member of Oxford City Council from 1920 to 1947, and served as Oxford's mayor for a year from 1938. He involved himself in the issue of the city's electricity supply. He was elected for South ward; an Independent, he generally supported the Labour group on the Council in the 1930s. An attempt to have him made an alderman in 1936 foundered on Conservative opposition. He later served as alderman from 1942 to 1947.

As mayor, Gillett oversaw the creation of a training school and flying club at Oxford's aerodrome, meeting Eric Gordon England there. The project was objected to by the Labour concillor Richard Crossman. At the same period the Oxford Refugee Committee was founded, supported by local Quakers..

== Associations and activism ==
Gillett participated in the Adult School movement in Oxford, chairing in 1913 lectures by Keith Feiling and Wilfrid Harris Crook, brother of Margaret Brackenbury Crook. He himself, as President of the Cowley Road Adult School, gave a talk on Pasteur. It was chaired by Henry William Appleton.

Gillett supported the pacifist Joseph Edward "John" Hoare (1896–1980) of World War I. Raymond Postgate, another conscientious objector of the period, stayed with the Gillett family; he was at the same time being supported by Cecil John Cadoux.

In 1919 Gillett made arrangements for Horace Alexander to attend the Quaker conference at Oriel College in September. Lucy Gillett gave Adult School talks on Booker T. Washington in 1920, and on Germany's World War I reparations in 1923. In 1924 Henry Gillett spoke at a meeting of the League of Nations Union at Thame, with William Hepburn Buckler.

C. Mary Pask, in 1919 an organiser of collections for Save the Children, was in 1928 organising collections at 15 King Edward Street for distressed coal mining areas. As a brother-in-law of Joseph Rowntree Gillett, Henry Gillett, with his wife Lucy, was among the Oxford group of supporters around A. D. Lindsay contacted by William and Emma Noble, for development of the South Wales Depression-era project at Maes yr Haf.

On 6 May 1934 Gillett took part in Oxford in a protest meeting against a sedition bill then before parliament, with John Lawson, Gilbert Murray, D. N. Pritt and Michael Sadler. On 10 May he was one of a Quaker deputation that saw Sir Thomas Inskip on the issue, with the former Member of Parliament Edmund Harvey and led by Harold J. Morland. The measure became law as the Incitement to Disaffection Act 1934.

After the Nazi boycott of Jewish businesses of 1 April 1933, Gillett brought to the Quaker Meeting for Sufferings a request for action. A committee was set up chaired by George Barker Jeffery. Gillett travelled in 1937 to Germany with Corder Catchpool, whose work he had helped to fund, and Douglas V. Steere. In the period 1937 to 1939 he corresponded with Hans Grimm.

=== Oxford Committee for Famine Relief ===
Gillett was a leading figure among Quakers in Oxford, who belonged to the Meeting for Sufferings and the national Yearly Meeting. The foundation of the charity Oxford Committee for Famine Relief (OCFR), now known as Oxfam, was a staged process in 1942, in a climate of great concern about the human cost of fighting in the Mediterranean and Middle East theatre. The national Famine Relief Committee (FRC) of 1942 in practical terms was a largely Quaker initiative. The FRC had a lone but central Quaker member, its secretary Edith Pye, in charge of communications. Gillett adopted her approach of underplaying the Quaker dimension of the campaign, in favour of seeking a base in general public opinion.

On 20 July 1942 Pye spoke at the Friends Meeting House in Oxford. The immediate issue that the FRC wished to address was food security in Belgium and Greece, occupation of the latter having caused the Great Famine. A provisional Oxford committee was formed on 20 July, with C. Mary Pask as secretary.

A meeting convened at the Old Library of University Church of St Mary the Virgin by Dick Milford on 5 October 1942 moved matters on. It involved Gillett and also Gilbert Murray of the FRC. Alan Pim was appointed treasurer of the OCFR, established as a support group for the FRC, which became a membership organisation. It set about lobbying activities. At this point Pask was replaced as secretary by Cecil Jackson-Cole, another Quaker associate. Milford, who had been prompted to act by Gillett, became chairman of the OCFR. Funds raised initially were channelled through the Greek Red Cross.

The Minister for Economic Warfare, responsible for the British blockades, was Roundell Palmer, 3rd Earl of Selborne, also covertly running the Special Operations Executive that took most of his time. Gillett was one of the 15-member delegation that met Lord Selborne on 4 January 1944. Selborne rehearsed arguments that Dingle Foot had given in 1943, adding that some steps were being taken secretly.

== Works ==
- Vaccine Therapy in Acute and Chronic Respiratory Infections (1933)
- The Spiritual Basis of Democracy: The Living Way Through Christianity (1954)

== Family ==
Gillett married Lucy Bancroft, daughter of William Poole Bancroft; her sister Sarah married another English Quaker, Roger Clark. The couple had three daughters and two sons.

In 1940 their daughter Esther married at Jordans Meeting House the educator Eric G. Curtis, later of Earlham College; the family moved to the United States in 1948. In June of 1940 Curtis, a teacher at Oundle School, faced a conscientious objectors tribunal at Leicester, after which he did service teaching at Bootham School. He became headmaster of George School.

As a memorial to their daughter Jenepher who died in 1938 at age 22, the Gilletts in 1948 bought Charney Manor and gave it to the Society of Friends, with a trust fund.

In 1906, Henry Gillett's banker cousin Arthur Bevington Gillett was using 15 King Edmund Street as a business address, for an Oxford branch of Gillett & Co. He was married to Margaret Clark Gillett. The correspondence of Jan Smuts includes letters to Margaret and Arthur, and also to Henry Gillett and Roger Clark.
