= Walter Birmingham =

Educationist and economist

Warden of Toynbee Hall
- In office 1964–1972
- Preceded by: Jack Catchpool
- Succeeded by: Donald Piers Chesworth

Personal details
- Born: 4 January 1913 Firozpur, India
- Died: 16 August 2004 (aged 91)
- Education: London School of Economics

Walter Birmingham (January 4, 1913 – August 16, 2004) was an educationist and economist who served as the warden of Toynbee Hall. He also worked on economic planning for West Africa in the post-colonial era.

== Early life ==
Birmingham was born in Firozpur, India, in 1913.

He took night classes at the London School of Economics, obtaining a degree in economics.

== Career ==
Birmingham taught at several British, African, and American universities and was involved in economic development planning for West Africa.

He was professor of economics at the University of Lesotho.

=== Toynbee Hall ===
In 1964, Birmingham was appointed warden of the Victorian charity Toynbee Hall, which had fallen on hard times.

Soon after taking post, he took on the disgraced former government minister John Profumo as a volunteer. Profumo would continue to support Toynbee Hall for decades, eventually becoming chairman of the charity.

== Personal life ==
He married twice with a son and a daughter from his first marriage and two sons and one daughter from the second.

A sculpture of Birmingham by Betty Jukes is housed at Toynbee Hall.
