= Stepney Children's Fund =

British children's charity

Stepney Children's Fund is a British children's charity. The fund was the brainchild in 1980 of Toynbee Hall Warden, Donald Piers Chesworth OBE, and a Roland House then later Toynbee Hall Resident, Bob Le Vaillant. At the time, Bob Le Vaillant was a serving Army Warrant Officer in the Ministry of Defence in Whitehall. He was living in the East End and working off duty as a Scout Leader (later Scout District Commissioner for Tower Hamlets and Development Commissioner for Central London) with Scout Groups at the East End Methodist Mission and Toynbee Hall.

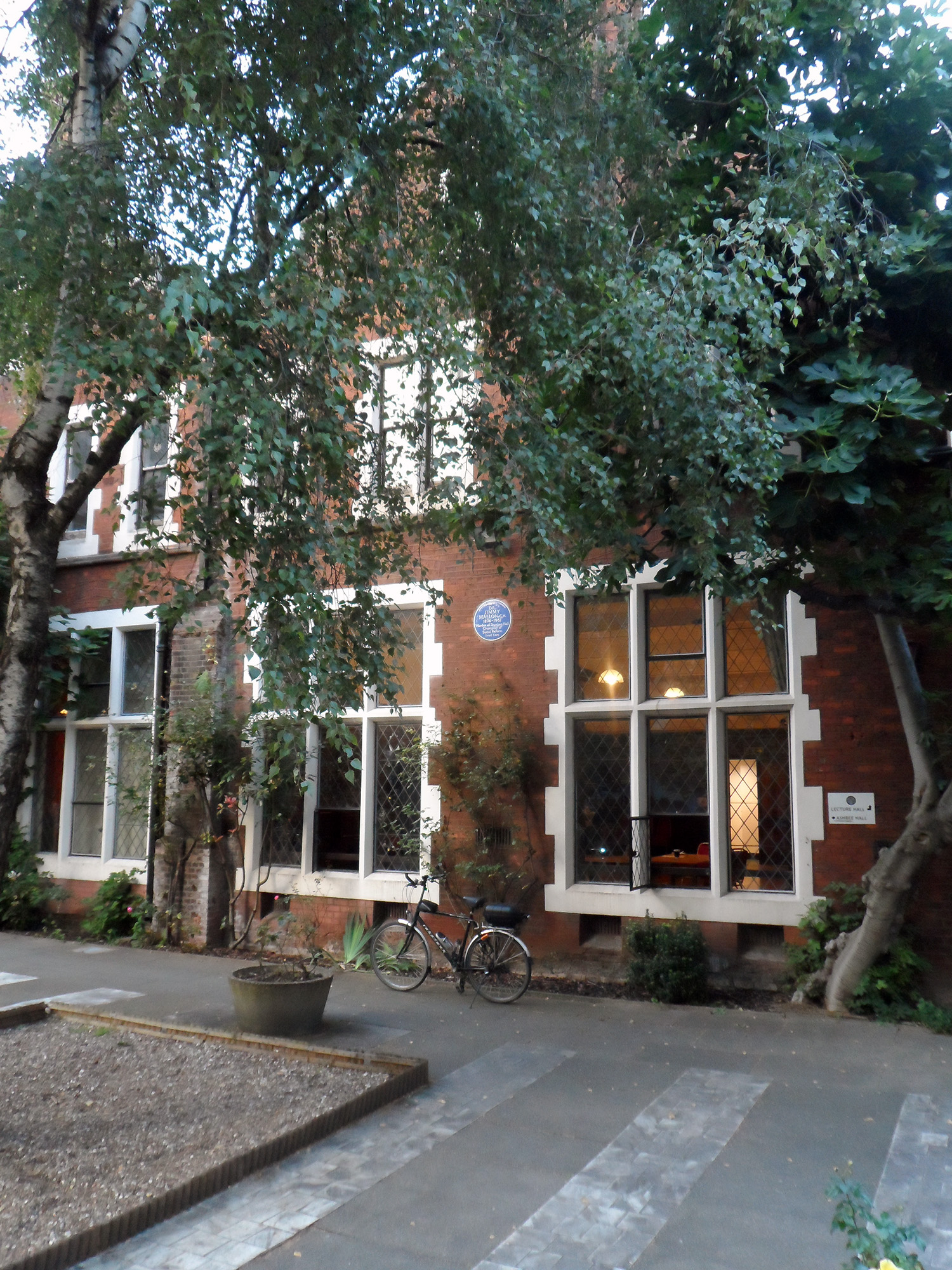
Toynbee Hall

The Fund was constituted at Toynbee Hall on 19 September 1982. Trustees were: Ann Crisp, wife of Toynbee Hall Deputy Warden, John Crisp; Mr John Crisp, Freny Kapadia (Toynbee Hall Resident); Bob Le Vaillant (Toynbee Hall Resident); and Derek Noblett (Police Constable, H District Metropolitan Police Youth & Community Section).

The objects of the Fund were to "assist families which include children who have qualified for holidays through the Stepney Committee of the Children's Country Holidays Fund (CCHF), viz., needy children of all races, colours and creeds aged between five and thirteen (five and twelve in the case of girls), whether or not such holidays have been provided." The Fund had power to raise funds and spend them on activities including outings, visits, parties, holidays, camps, etc. The Fund shared Toynbee Hall's Charity Registration 211850 and the Fund's accounts were audited and incorporated in Toynbee Hall's main accounts.

In 1986 on Bob Le Vaillant's retirement from the Forces and with a pledge by BP of salary funding for a Director, Toynbee Hall appointed Bob Le Vaillant to set up and run a Children's Department. The department effectively absorbed Stepney Children's Fund work but nevertheless continued using the Fund's name as it was well-established and respected especially in areas of the countryside where 'Stepney' children camped or were sent on holidays.

A number of projects were established and developed in partnership with national youth organisations, Metropolitan Police, local schools and caring agencies. Projects included Tower Hamlets/Central London County Scoutreach, Youth Outreach Special Summer Camps and Schoolchildren’s Day Camps, Youth Crime Diversion Befriending Scheme, Parent’s Support, Young Leader Training and Duke of Edinburgh’s Award Scheme and a national programme of social awareness lectures, fundraising and volunteer recruitment.

In the mid 1980s and on the invitation and sponsorship and full involvement of Christopher James, 5th Baron Northbourne, who later became the Fund's Chairman and a Toynbee Hall Trustee, Bob Le Vaillant set up a programme of Special Summer Camps running each year on the Northbourne Estate in Betteshanger. The camps were based on the principles of the Scout Association's 'Scoutreach' Development Project which Bob had already trialed in partnership mainly with Scouts in Hay-on-Wye. Activities relied almost wholly on volunteer leadership which required young men and women to be recruited throughout UK and overseas, as well as through the home-grown 'Young Leader' Scheme. The Summer Camps continued until early 2000 when Bob Le Vaillant who was additionally Toynbee Hall Deputy Warden stepped down from heading the Children's Services and took a greater part in the central reorganisation of Toynbee Hall.

In 2000, Bob and his wife were in the process of adopting 3 children. Bob retired from Toynbee Hall in 2005 and moved with his family to Kent. The final edition of Stepney Children's Fund Annual Report "Who Cares?" was published in the Winter of 2002.
