= Fati N'zi-Hassane =

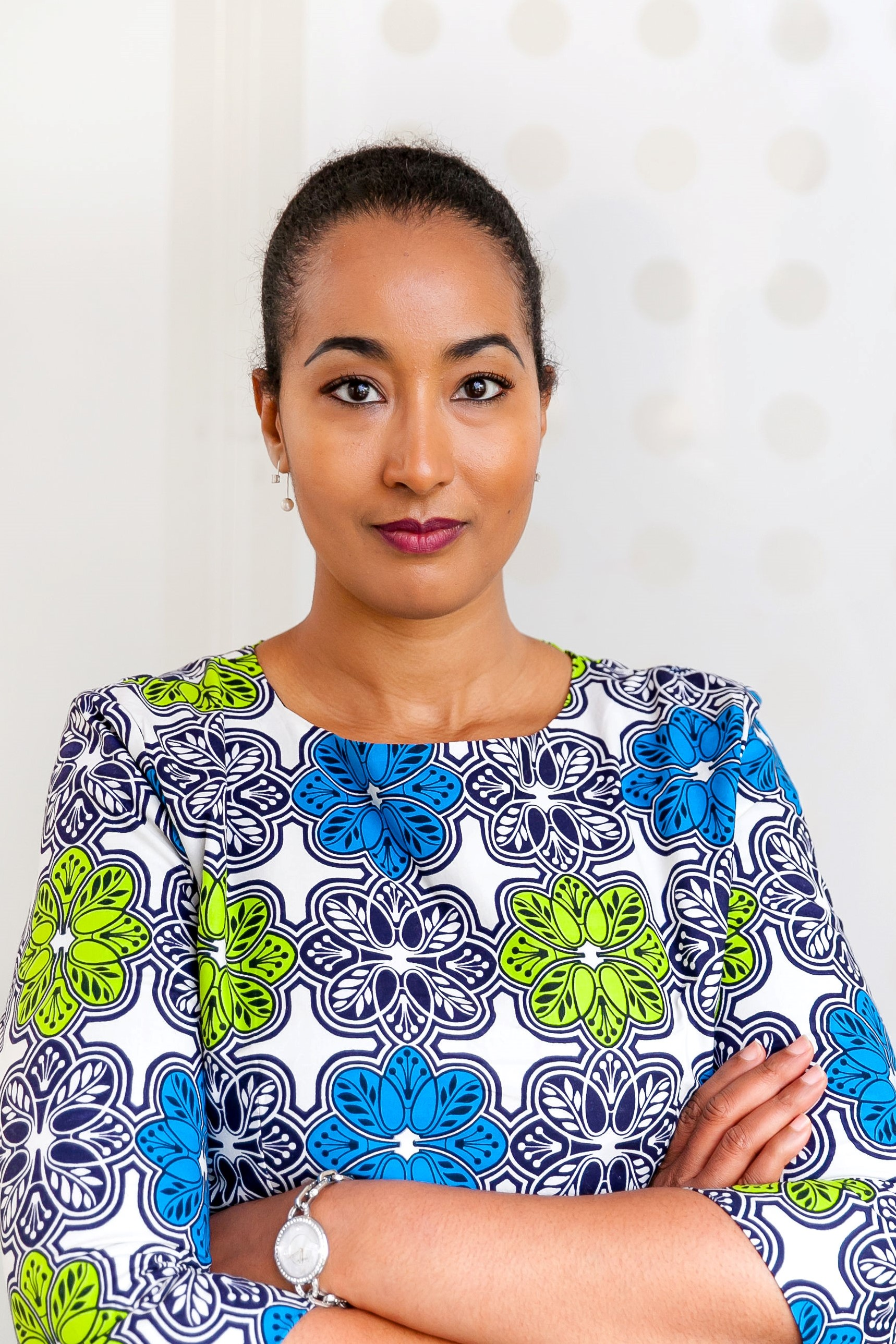
- N'zi-Hassane in 2019
- Citizenship: Nigerien
- Education: ESSEC Business School, National School of Statistics and Applied Economics of Abidjan
- Occupation: Humanitarian campaigner
- Title: Africa Director of Oxfam International

Fati N'zi-Hassane is a Nigerien humanitarian campaigner, Africa Director of Oxfam International.

== Life ==
Fati N'zi-Hassane gained a degree in statistics and demography from the National School of Statistics and Applied Economics of Abidjan in 2002. In 2005 she gained an MBA from ESSEC Business School.

Fati N'zi-Hassane worked for a decade as a management consultant and program manager for international firms in Europe. In 2016 she joined the African Union Development Agency (AUDA-NEPAD). Initially working as Chief as Staff to the Executive Secretary, Ibrahim Assane Mayaki, she became Head of the Skills and Employment Programme and then Head of the Human Development and Institutions Division.

N'zi-Hassane became Africa Director of Oxfam International in October 2022. In September 2024 she called for reform of the UN Security Council, to reflect the needs of African countries:

The UN Security Council was built in a bygone colonial time and is marred by deep inequalities that does not reflect the realities of today. Despite bearing the brunt of both climate change and ongoing conflicts, Africa's voice remains muted in the corridors of global power. This has robbed Africa of opportunities for peace and sustainable development.
