= Dick Milford =

English Anglican priest and Oxfam founder (1895–1987)

Theodore Richard Milford (10 June 1895 – 19 January 1987) was an English clergyman, educator and philanthropist, who was involved in the founding of Oxfam.

== Early life ==
He was born at Yockleton Hall, Shropshire, on 10 June 1895, the eldest of the three sons of the schoolmaster Robert Theodore Milford and Elspeth Barter, granddaughter of George Moberly. He attended Clifton College.

In 1914, Milford volunteered and was posted to the 19th Royal Fusiliers. He was then commissioned in the Oxford and Buckinghamshire Light Infantry. He fought in Mesopotamia with periods of leave in India. In 1918 he was sent to Cairo to train for the Royal Flying Corps, but in 1919 was invalided out.

That year, Milford went up to Magdalen College, Oxford, to study literae humaniores. He graduated with a first-class degree in 1921. As did the same year his younger brother Campbell Seymour Milford (1896–1981), at Brasenose College, who preceded him into the Church of England as a deacon (1926) and priest (1927), and went to St Paul's College, Calcutta. Dick Milford wrote "Two Brothers. A Milford Memoir 1895-1935", a manuscript now in the Bodleian Library.

== Church Missionary Society ==
From 1921 to 1935, Milford worked for the Church Missionary Society. He had been involved with the Student Christian Movement (SCM) at Oxford. He returned to India to teach at Alwaye College, Travancore (1921–1923). It was an "entirely Indian venture", and William Edward Sladen Holland also was there. He moved on St. John's College, Agra (1923–1924). He went back to the United Kingdom, to serve as local SCM secretary in Liverpool between 1924 and 1926.

Milford spent the academic year 1930–1 training for ordination at Westcott House, Cambridge, and was ordained deacon in 1931. He was made a priest in Lucknow, India, in 1934. He was again a lecturer at St John's, Agra, from 1931 to 1935, and acted as examining chaplain to Bishop Charles Saunders from 1933.

== Later clerical career ==
In 1935 Milford returned to England in 1935 to serve as curate at All Hallows, Lombard Street, London. At the same time, he worked as study secretary for the SCM. He left both positions in 1938, to become Vicar of St Mary's, the Oxford University church, succeeding Frederic Cockin. In 1939 he commissioned the Christmas play The House by the Stable from Charles Williams, and invited C. S. Lewis to preach at St Mary's, a sermon that was published as "Learning in War-time". He founded a group known as the Colloquy of "philosophically and theologically minded students", which met regularly at his vicarage, to 1947.

In 1947, Milford left his post at St Mary's to become canon and chancellor of Lincoln Cathedral, having special responsibility for religious education in the diocese, including Lincoln Theological College. In 1958, he became Master of the Temple in London, a change of milieu, and a found himself in conflict with the benchers on some issues. During the prosecution of Penguin Books related to the publication of Lady Chatterley's Lover, Milford appeared for the defence.

== Last years ==
In 1968, Milford left the Temple and retired to Shaftesbury, where he ran a group studying Teilhard de Chardin,. He died on 19 January 1987. Papers are held by the University of Leeds.

== Oxfam ==
On 5 October 1942, Milford convened a meeting in the Old Library at St Mary's, Oxford, to discuss the famine in Axis-occupied Greece. Those concerned included Cecil Jackson-Cole, Gilbert Murray and his wife Lady Mary, and Alan Pim, and Milford had been prompted by the Quaker Henry Gillett.

By this period of WWII, the Council on Foreign Relations of the Church of England had come down in favour of "cross-blockade" food relief, with the backing of William Temple, Archbishop of Canterbury. The Food Relief Campaign of the Peace Pledge Union was chaired by Vera Brittain, active as a speaker in 1942. Significant in this development was Edith Pye, Quaker secretary of the famine relief committee chaired by George Bell. She had addressed an Oxford meeting on 20 July that year on relief needed for Belgium and Greece, of Quakers, invited guests and "influential Oxford citizens." The original project of the committee was food to Greece through the Allied naval blockade.

There resulted the foundation of the Oxford Committee for Famine Relief, of which Milford was the first chairman. He was for a second time its chairman from 1960 to 1965. The registered charity name Oxfam of 1958 was adopted in 1965.

== Works ==
- Foolishness to the Greeks (1953)
- The Valley of Decision: The Christian Dilemma in the Nuclear Age (1961)
- Belated Harvest (1978)

== Personal life ==
Milford married, first in 1932, Nancy Dickens Bourchier (died 1936), daughter of the solicitor Ernest Hawksley; there were two daughters of the marriage. He married secondly in 1937 Margaret Nowell Smith, daughter of Nowell Charles Smith; they had a son who died in infancy, and two daughters.
