= Mark Goldring =

Mark Ian Goldring CBE (born 8 March 1957) was chief executive officer of the charity Oxfam GB, Oxfam's British affiliate. He was appointed in May 2013 and resigned in 2018. Since 2020 he has been Director of Oxford-based charity Asylum Welcome.

== Early life and education ==
Goldring was educated at Churcher's College. He has a bachelor's degree in law from Keble College, Oxford, and a master's degree in Social Policy and Planning in Developing Countries from the London School of Economics.

== Career ==
After leaving University, Goldring volunteered with VSO. Goldring volunteered as a teacher in a small town in Borneo for two years.

After leaving VSO, Goldring worked as a legal researcher for BP for nine months, before rejoining VSO, this time as an employee, first in Barbados and then Bhutan, where he set up its operation, and lived for three years.

On returning to London, Goldring completed an MA in Social Policy and Planning in Developing Countries from the London School of Economics. Goldring then joined the United Nations Development Programme, serving as Assistant Resident Representative in its field office in Bangladesh where he oversaw projects in the social sectors. Goldring took a job as Oxfam's country director in Bangladesh, while his wife, Rachel, worked for UNICEF. Goldring later moved to Fiji and ran the British government's South Pacific development programme.

Following his time in Fiji, Goldring was appointed chief executive of VSO, a role that he held from 1999 to 2008.

Goldring was appointed a CBE in 2008 for services to tackling poverty and disadvantage.

In 2008 he also began work as chief executive of Mencap, where he remained for five years.

In May 2013, Goldring was appointed chief executive of Oxfam. He stepped down from his role in January 2019, in the wake of the Haiti safeguarding scandal.

Goldring is currently Director of Asylum Welcome, a role he has held since 2020.

== Personal life ==
Goldring is married to Rachel Carnegie. The couple have two adult children. Goldring's elder daughter was born in Bangladesh. Goldring's son was born in Fiji.
