= Oxfam =

Charitable humanitarian organization

- Named after: Oxford Committee for Famine Relief
- Founded: 5 October 1942; 84 years ago
- Founded at: Oxford, England
- Type: International NGO
- Registration no.: 202918
- Purpose: "Working with thousands of local partner organizations, we work with people living in poverty striving to exercise their human rights, assert their dignity as full citizens and take control of their lives"
- Headquarters: Nairobi, Kenya
- Region served: Worldwide
- Director: Amitabh Behar
- Board of directors: Aruna Rao (Chair)
- Revenue: €1 billion (2024)
- Expenses: €1 billion (2024)
- Website: www.oxfam.org

Oxfam is an international confederation of 21 independent non-governmental organizations (NGOs), focusing on the alleviation of global poverty, founded in 1942 and led by Oxfam International. It began as the Oxford Committee for Famine Relief in Oxford, England, in 1942, to alleviate World War Two-related hunger and continued in the aftermath of the war. Oxfam has an international presence with operations in 79 countries and 21 members in the Oxfam Confederation in Australia, Asia, Europe, the Middle East, North and Latin America and the Caribbean.

Since 2005, Oxfam International has been involved in a series of controversies as it expanded, especially concerning its operations in Haiti and Chad. There have been criticisms of its management of operations in the UK as well.

== History ==
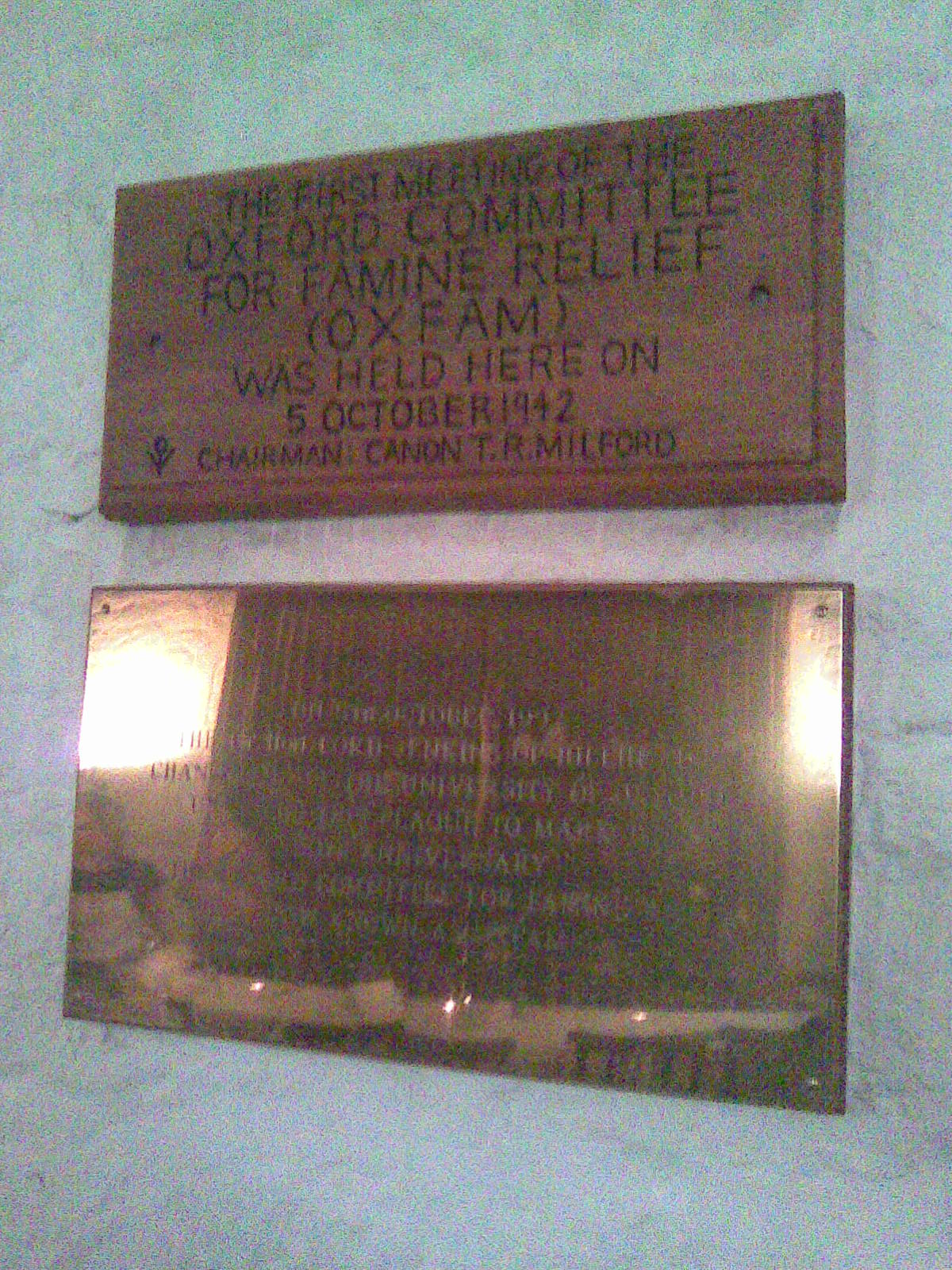
Plaque commemorating first meeting of Oxfam in the Old Library, the University Church, Oxford

Founded at 17 Broad Street, Oxford, as the Oxford Committee for Famine Relief by a group of Quakers, social activists, and Oxford academics in 1942, it was registered in accordance with UK law in 1943. The original committee was a group of concerned citizens, including Henry Gillett (a prominent local Quaker), Theodore Richard Milford, Gilbert Murray and his wife Mary, Cecil Jackson-Cole, and Alan Pim. The committee met in the Old Library of University Church of St Mary the Virgin, Oxford, for the first time in 1942, and its aim was to help starving citizens of occupied Greece, a famine caused by the Axis occupation of Greece and Allied naval blockades and to persuade the British government to allow food relief through the blockade. The Oxford committee was one of several local committees formed in support of the National Famine Relief Committee.

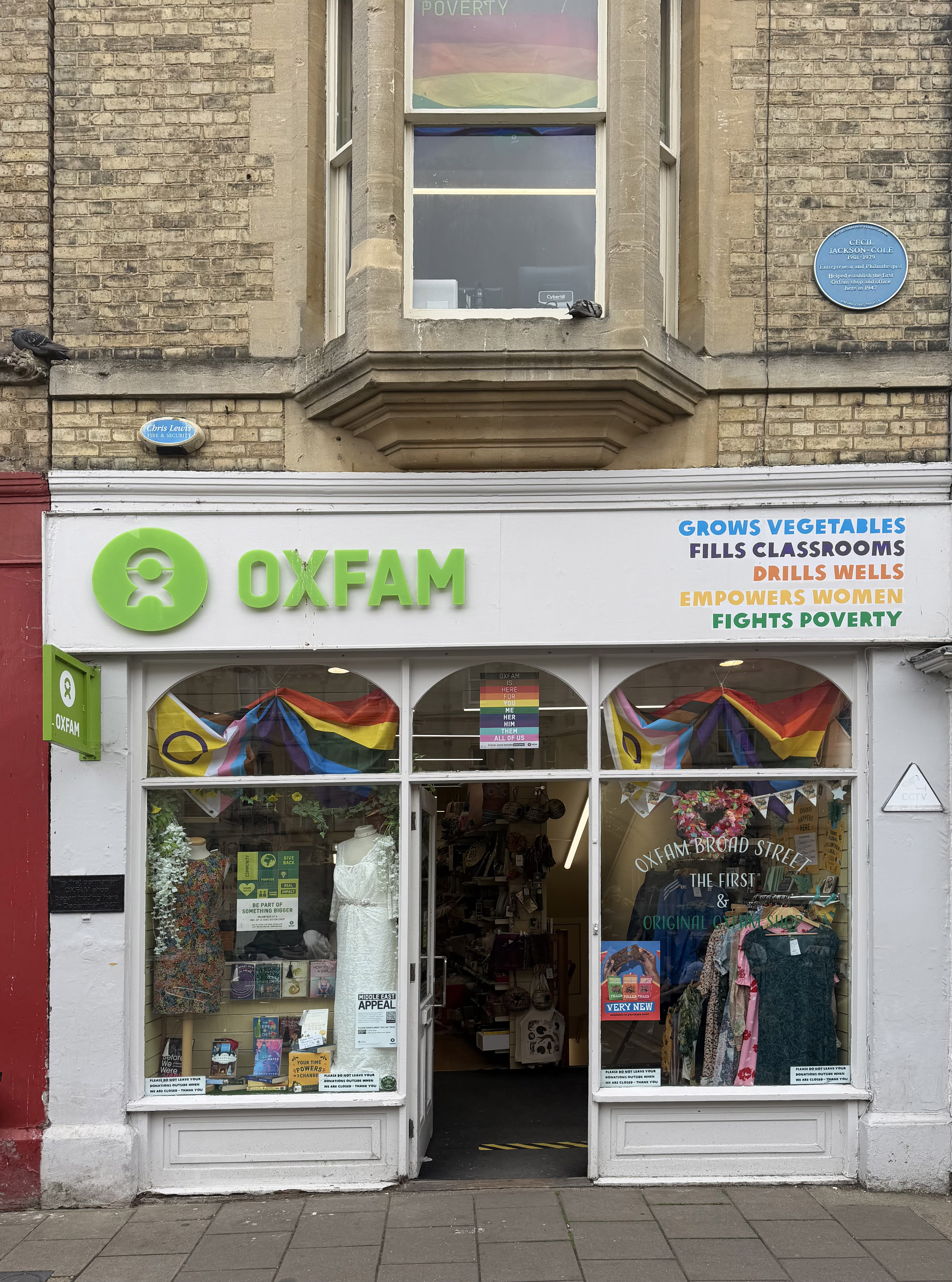
Oxfam’s original shop, at 17 Broad Street in Oxford

The first permanent Oxfam gift shop was on Broad Street, Oxford; it opened in 1947. Oxfam's first paid employee was Joe Mitty, who began working at the Oxfam shop on Broad Street, Oxford, on 9 November 1949. Engaged to manage the accounts and distribute donated clothing, he originated the policy of selling anything people were willing to donate, and developed the shop into a national chain.

Fundraising innovations led by advertising adviser Harold Sumption, including rigorous testing of advertising campaigns, direct mail, the trading catalogue, and the first multimedia fundraising campaign the "Hunger £ Million", helped Oxfam become, for a time, the largest charity in the UK. By 1960, it was an international nongovernmental aid organization. The first overseas committee was founded in Canada in 1963, and in 1965, the organization changed its name to its telegraphic address, OXFAM. The Oxford committee became known as Oxfam GB. In 1995 Oxfam International was formed by a group of independent non-governmental organizations. Stichting Oxfam International was registered as a non-profit foundation at The Hague, Netherlands, in 1996.

Winnie Byanyima was the executive director of Oxfam International from 2013 to 2019.

== Oxfam's work ==
=== Focus ===
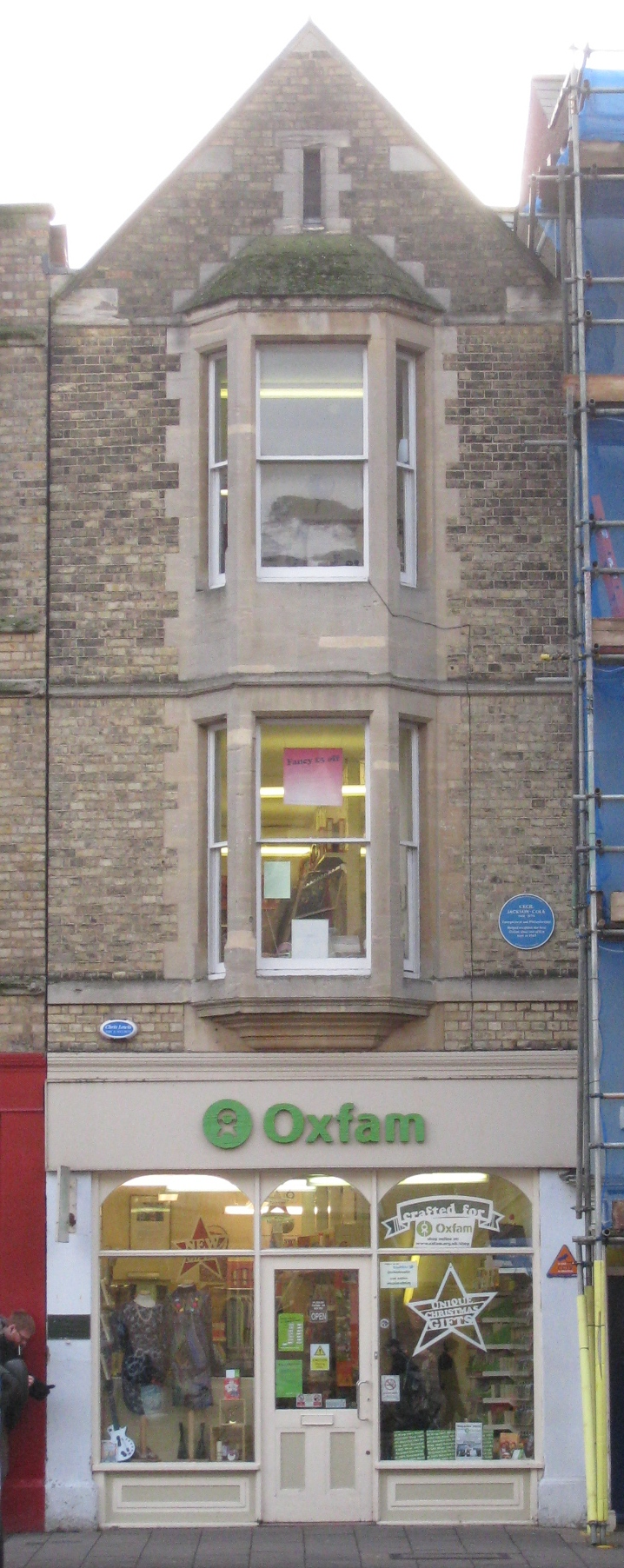
Original Oxfam shop at 17 Broad Street, Oxford

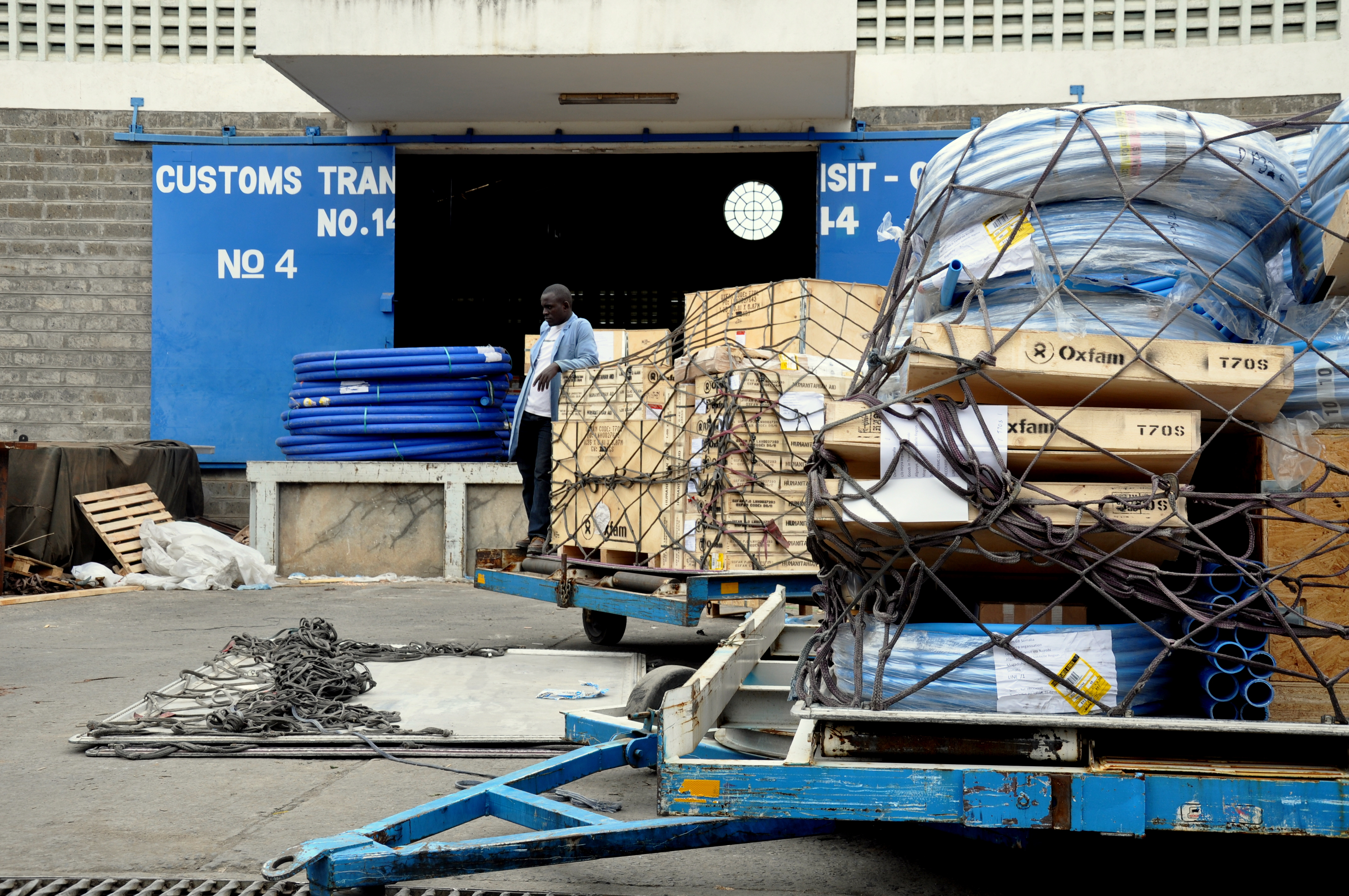
Oxfam relief supplies outside the Siginon warehouse in Nairobi, Kenya

Oxfam has provided relief services during various global crises, including the Israeli–Palestinian conflict, North Korean famine, 2011 East Africa drought, 2012 Sahel drought, Nepal earthquake, and Yemeni crisis. The Bosfam NGO was also founded in May 1995 by women participating in an Oxfam GB psychosocial 'radionice' project to support internally displaced women during the Bosnian war. Oxfam has become a globally recognized leader in providing water sanitation to impoverished and war-torn areas the world over. In 2012, Oxfam became one of the humanitarian groups that comprise the UK's Rapid Response Facility to ensure clean water in the wake of humanitarian disasters.

A January 2014 Oxfam report claimed the 85 wealthiest individuals in the world have a combined wealth equal to that of the bottom 50% of the world's population, or about 3.5 billion people. In January 2015, Oxfam predicted the wealthiest 1% of income earners will own more than half of global wealth by 2016. An Oxfam report released in 2017 stated that eight billionaires possess the same amount of wealth as the poorest half of humanity.

The current focus of Oxfam's campaigns includes economic inequality (including tax justice), gender justice and climate change.

=== Past Campaigns ===
The Make Trade Fair campaign organized by Oxfam International focuses on the elimination of trade practices, such as dumping, which occurs when highly subsidized, surplus commodities from developed countries such as rice, cotton, corn, and sugar are sold at low prices and farmers from poor countries have difficulty competing. Another practice Oxfam opposes is the setting of tariffs, where nations enforce high taxes on imported goods, restricting the sales of products from other nations, unbalanced labour rights for women, who often earn lower wages than their male counterparts, and stringent patent issues that prevent the prices of medication, software, and textbooks (e.g. gene patents, chemical patents, and software patents) from being lowered. Thus, such essential goods are often inaccessible to developing nations.

As part of its work Oxfam has also campaigned on issues regarding coffee farming. In October 2006, Oxfam accused Starbucks of asking the National Coffee Association (NCA) to block a US trademark application from Ethiopia for three of the country's coffee beans, Sidamo, Harar and Yirgacheffe. They claimed this could result in denying Ethiopian coffee farmers potential annual earnings of up to £47m. Following this Starbucks had placed pamphlets in its stores accusing Oxfam of "misleading behavior" and insisting that its "campaign need[s] to stop", while The Economist derided Oxfam's "simplistic" stance and Ethiopia's "economically illiterate" government, arguing that Starbucks' (and Illy's) standards-based approach would ultimately benefit farmers more. In June 2007, Ethiopian Government representatives and senior leaders from Starbucks Coffee Company worked out an agreement regarding distribution, marketing and licensing that recognized the importance and integrity of Ethiopia's specialty coffee designations. An Oxfam spokesman said the deal sounds like a "useful step" as long as farmers are benefiting, and a big step from a year prior when Starbucks "wasn't engaging directly (with) Ethiopians on adding value to their coffee".

=== Shops ===
Oxfam has shops all over the world, which sell many fair-trade and donated items since their first charity shop opened in 1948, although trading began in 1947. The proceeds from these are used to further Oxfam's mission and relief efforts around the globe. Much of their stock comes from public donations but as of 2012 they still sold fair trade products from developing countries in Africa, Asia and South America, including handcrafts, books, music CDs and instruments, clothing, toys, food, and ethnic creations. Objects marketed in the "Sourced by Oxfam" range are brought to the public through fair trade to help boost the quality of life of their producers and surrounding communities.

As of 2010, Oxfam had over 1,200 shops worldwide. More than half of them were in the UK, with around 750 Oxfam GB shops, including specialist shops such as books, music, furniture, and bridal wear. Oxfam Germany has 45 shops, including specialist book shops; Oxfam France shops sell second-hand books and clothes, and Oxfam Hong Kong has two shops selling donated goods and fair-trade products. Oxfam Novib (in the Netherlands), Oxfam Australia (with over 20 fair trade shops), Oxfam Ireland and Oxfam in Belgium also raise funds from shops.

Of the Oxfam charity shops around the UK, around 100 are specialist bookshops or book and music shops. Oxfam is the largest retailer of second-hand books in Europe, selling around 12 million per year. In 2008, Oxfam GB worked with over 20,000 volunteers in shops across the UK, raising £17.1 million for Oxfam's programme work.

In the wake of the 2018 sexual abuse scandal, CEO Mark Goldring admitted closures of some Oxfam shops were likely. Allegations also appeared at this time regarding sexual harassment in Oxfam shops in Britain. Sector press later reported that Oxfam closed 26 of its shops in 2020 and that shops made an operational loss of £12.9 million in 2020, with further closures reported in local media thereafter.

==== Oxfam bookshops ====
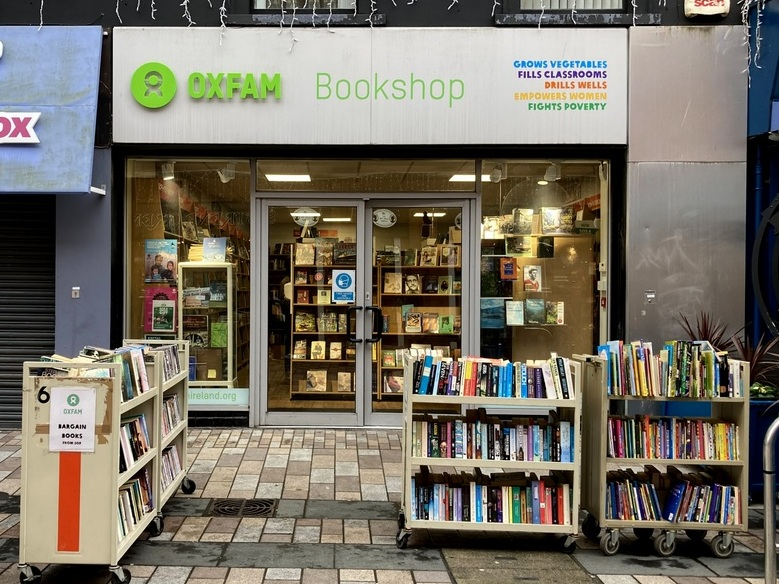
An Oxfam bookshop in Belfast, Northern Ireland

Oxfam is the largest retailer of second-hand books in Europe, selling around 12 million per year. Most of Oxfam's 600 charity shops around the UK sell books, and around 100 are specialist bookshops or book and music shops. A typical Oxfam bookshop will have around 50 volunteers, as well as a small number of full-time staff. As of 2009, the charity makes around £1.6 million each month from book sales.

Books are donated directly to shops by the public, or through Oxfam's "book banks" in convenient locations around the country. The profits of the book sales support the work of the charity.

Following a revival in the fortunes of the new and second-hand book industry at the end of the 1990s, Oxfam began to rapidly expand its specialist bookshops. By 2003 it had 60 brightly lit and modern bookshops aiming to shake off the old 'dank and dusty' image. Modern ones typically boast professional fittings and a wide range of stock, including recent novels, specialist textbooks and out-of-print curios.

Small bookshops have complained that Oxfam receives unfair advantages in the form of favourable tax rates and cheaper waste disposal, amongst other things. In response to these criticisms, Oxfam has said that much of the damage to small book retailers has come from supermarkets and online retailers, particularly Tesco and Amazon.

Oxfam Ireland operates bookshops throughout both the Republic of Ireland and Northern Ireland. France has two Oxfam bookshops in Paris as well as in Strasbourg, Lille, Villeurbanne and Bordeaux. In Belgium, there are Oxfam bookshops in Brussels (Ixelles and Uccle), Liège, Namur, Antwerp, Ghent, Leuven, Kortrijk and Hasselt. There is one Oxfam bookshop in Australia, in the city of Adelaide, run by about 130 volunteers.

=== Fundraising ===
Oxfam has several successful fundraising channels in addition to its shops. Over half a million people in the UK make a regular financial contribution to its work. In April 2017, the Information Commissioner's Office fined Oxfam charities for breaching the Data Protection Act by misusing donors' personal data. Oxfam was fined £6,000.

== Offices and affiliates ==
Oxfam International consists of 21 affiliates and the international secretariat in Nairobi. Additional offices were in Addis Ababa, Washington, DC, New York City, Brussels, and Geneva.

Affiliates	Country/Region	Established	Full affiliate since
Oxfam America	United States	1970	1995
Oxfam Australia	Australia	1954 (as Food for Peace Campaign)	1995
Oxfam Belgique/ Oxfam België	Belgium	1964	1995
Oxfam Brasil	Brazil	1958	2016
Oxfam Canada	Canada	1966	1995
Oxfam Colombia	Colombia	2020	2021
Oxfam France	France	1988	2006
Oxfam Germany	Germany	1995	2003
Oxfam GB	United Kingdom	1942	1995
Oxfam Hong Kong	Hong Kong	1976	1995
Oxfam Denmark	Denmark	1966 (as World University Service, WUS)	2015
Oxfam Italia	Italy	1976 (as Ucodep)	2012
Oxfam Intermón	Spain	1956 (as Intermón)	1997
Oxfam India	India	2008	2011
Oxfam Ireland	Ireland United Kingdom	1971 (as Oxfam Northern Ireland)	1998
Oxfam Mexico	Mexico	1996	2008
Oxfam New Zealand	New Zealand	1991	1995
Oxfam Novib	Netherlands	1956 (as Novib)	1995
Oxfam Québec	Canada	1973	1995
Oxfam Türkiye	Turkey	1986	2019
Oxfam South Africa	South Africa	2013	2016

Oxfam Japan was a member from 2003 until its closure in 2018.

Oxfam is in process of exploring additional southern affiliates in the global south, including Oxfam in the Pacific, The Philippines, Senegal, Kenya and Indonesia.

=== Oxfam International ===
Countries/Regions with Oxfam members

The Oxfam International Secretariat (OIS) leads, facilitates, and supports collaboration between the Oxfam affiliates. The OIS Board comprises the executive director, chair of each affiliate, and the OI chair. The affiliates' chairs are voting members and are not remunerated. The executive directors and the OI Chair are all non-voting members. The board also elects the deputy chair and treasurer from among its voting members. The board is responsible for ensuring that Oxfam International is accountable, transparent, and fit for purpose. In 2009–10, it had about 77 staff (including secondment placements and temporary staff). It is funded by contributions from affiliate organizations and has an operating budget of US$8.7M. The legal name of the entity is Stichting Oxfam International.

=== Oxfam America ===
In 1970, Oxfam America became an independent nonprofit organization and an Oxfam affiliate in response to the humanitarian crisis created by the fight for independence in Bangladesh. Oxfam America's headquarters are located in Boston, Massachusetts, with a policy and campaigns office in Washington, D.C., and seven regional offices around the world. A registered 501(c)3 organization, Oxfam America campaigns for climate change adaptation, food security, aid reform, access to medicines, and fair trade. Ray Offenheiser served as the president and CEO of Oxfam America from 1996 until 2016. As of 2017, the president and CEO is Abby Maxman.

=== Oxfam Australia ===
Oxfam Australia is an independent, not-for-profit, secular, community-based aid and development organization, and an affiliate of Oxfam International.

=== Oxfam Denmark ===
Oxfam Denmark has its roots in the Danish department of World University Service and has been active since the 1966 (initially mainly against apartheid and similar situations in other southern African nations). Since the 1970s, it mainly worked with projects in Africa and Latin America, and usually focused on democracy, education and the causes of poverty. In 1991, the affiliate broke loose and founded the independent organization IBIS, International Bistand International Solidaritet (in English: 'International Aid International Solidarity'), and was mainly involved with transformative education, inequality, women's rights and democracy. In 2015 IBIS became a member of Oxfam. Around the same time, the name was modified from IBIS to Oxfam IBIS, and in 2023 they made the complete transition and changed its name again to Oxfam Denmark. Today the organization mainly focus on transformative education, climate justice, economic justice and humanitarian aid.

=== Oxfam GB (Great Britain) ===
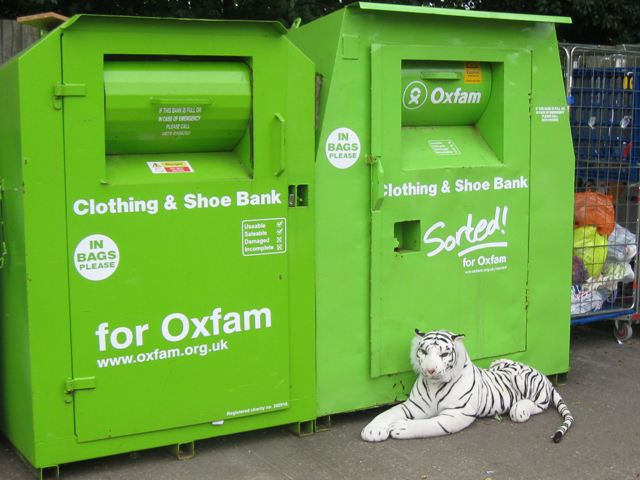
Oxfam clothing and shoe bank in the United Kingdom

Oxfam GB's headquarters are in Cowley, Oxford. The finance office is in Newcastle, from where Oxfam shops are managed. Oxfam GB had a total income of £408.6m in 2016/17, had 5,000 employees, and used the services of 23,000 volunteers. In 2016 it received £31.7m from the British government.

Mark Goldring was the chief executive officer from 2013 until January 2019, followed by Dhananjayan (Danny) Sriskandarajah who held office from January 2019 until December 2023. Halima Begum was announced as his successor as chief executive officer in December 2023.

Oxfam GB produces a regular supporter magazine called "Voices".

=== Oxfam India ===
Oxfam's involvement in India began when money was granted in 1951 to fight famine in Bihar in eastern India. Bihar at the time was one of the poorest and most populated states in India.

Oxfam had launched an appeal that led to the first report on Oxfam's work in the House of Commons in UK. On 31 May 1951, the Secretary of State for Commonwealth Relations commended the Bihar appeal, stating "the Oxford Committee for Famine Relief has made an appeal for donations and I hope individuals will reply to that generously". Among the many donations received was one for 100 British pounds from an Indian Rajah in appreciation of what Oxfam was doing for the hungry of his country.

A famine in Bihar would bring Oxfam back to India in 1965 to address drought arising due to failing monsoons. Bihar had a population of 53 million, of whom 40 million relied on subsistence farming to live. This would compound for India in the future; production of food had not been parallel to its exploding population. It is estimated that, over the course of the droughts and famines, 2,400 tons of milk was bought by Oxfam; at the peak of the programme, Oxfam support was feeding over 400,000 children and mothers. In 1968 Oxfam's first field director in India, Jim Howard, created the Oxfam Gramdan Action Programme, or OGAP. This was the first joint rural development programme in Oxfam and the first step to a new 'operational' Oxfam. Oxfam India was established on 1 September 2008 under section 25 of India's Companies Act, 1956 as a non-profit organization with its head office in Delhi. It is now a member of Oxfam International Confederation. This was marked by Oxfam's 60th year in India.

Effective from 1 January 2022, Oxfam lost its foreign-funding license registration under the Foreign Contribution Regulation Act (FCRA) which is mandatory for charities, NGOs and any non-profit organisations receiving foreign funding in India along with 6,000 other such organisations.

=== Oxfam New Zealand ===
Oxfam New Zealand is an aid and development organization and affiliate of Oxfam International. Oxfam NZ is also responsible for delivering Cyclone relief in several countries in the Pacific region. Oxfam New Zealand's work is made possible by supporters, interns, staff, volunteers, board and overseas partners. Most of the staff are based in their Auckland office. They also have a policy unit in Wellington. Most of Oxfam New Zealand's funds come from donations, supplemented by New Zealand government funds.

== Criticism ==
=== Israeli–Palestinian conflict ===
In 2002, Oxfam Belgium published a poster encouraging the boycott of Israel, including an image of a bloody orange. Some critics, including the Simon Wiesenthal Center, alleged the image resembled the antisemitic blood libel. Following complaints, Oxfam International said it did not support a boycott of Israel, agreed the poster’s message was inappropriate and regrettable, and offered an apology. Ian Anderson, president of Oxfam International, also condemned the Belgian office of Oxfam for the incident.

In October 2009, Oxfam was accused by Israeli NGO Regavim of aiding Palestinians in illegal activities in Kiryat Arba, including water theft. Oxfam has denied the allegations.

In response to a 2012 Oxfam report that blamed Israel for poor economic development in the Palestinian territories, a spokesman for the Israel embassy in the UK said: "Oxfam's latest report on the situation in the Palestinian territories puts a clearly political agenda above any humanitarian concern. Far from advancing peace, such an approach undermines the prospects of reaching a negotiated resolution to the conflict." In January 2013, Oxfam UK partnered on a joint project with the Board of Deputies, the largest Jewish organization in England. The project, Grow-Tatzmiach, included sending 25 people to an activist training programme to help fight global hunger. In exchange for partnering, Oxfam agreed not to "call for a boycott of Israeli goods or to support groups that do so, and will not partner with organizations that advocate violence or oppose a two-state solution to the Israeli–Palestinian conflict". Despite this agreement, there were still those on both sides who objected to this project. As of 2013, Oxfam endorsed the two-state solution and wants Israel to lift the blockade of the Gaza Strip and dismantle all of the Israeli settlement infrastructure.

On 17 January 2014, Oxfam UK cancelled the exhibition "Gaza: Through my Eyes", which had been due scheduled at East London Mosque. The cancellation came after Left Foot Forward presented information to the charity detailing controversial comments by Ibrahim Hewitt, one of the event organizers, which critics said were homophobic and possibly antisemitic. Human rights campaigner Peter Tatchell was reported as welcoming the event's cancellation but also expressed disappointment the organization "did no proper checks on (Mr. Hewitt) before agreeing to his presence."

On 29 January 2014, actress Scarlett Johansson resigned as an international spokeswoman for Oxfam after appearing in a TV ad for SodaStream, a company with presence in the West Bank. Her publicist stated how Johansson "respectfully decided to end her ambassador role with Oxfam after eight years ... She and Oxfam have a fundamental difference of opinion in regards to the boycott, divestment and sanctions movement."

In February 2015, Israeli NGO Regavim released a report stating the European Union had illegally funded the construction of houses with help from Oxfam and other groups. Oxfam defended the construction "on humanitarian grounds".

In 2019, Israeli intelligence services implicated Oxfam Belgium in funding the Popular Front for the Liberation of Palestine, which carried out a bomb attack the same year and killed Jewish teenager Rina Shnerb. Oxfam Belgium transferred funds to the subsidiary in the amount of 288,002 euros from 2017 to 2018, but claims to have made no funding since.

In March 2020, Israeli ambassador to the United Kingdom Mark Regev protested antisemitic books, notably the Protocols of the Elders of Zion, being sold on Oxfam's website. In response, the Oxfam GB chief executive apologized and removed the books from sale. In October 2020, NBC News reported Oxfam was on the list of human rights organizations the Trump administration was considering branding as antisemitic.

=== Internal structures and political role ===
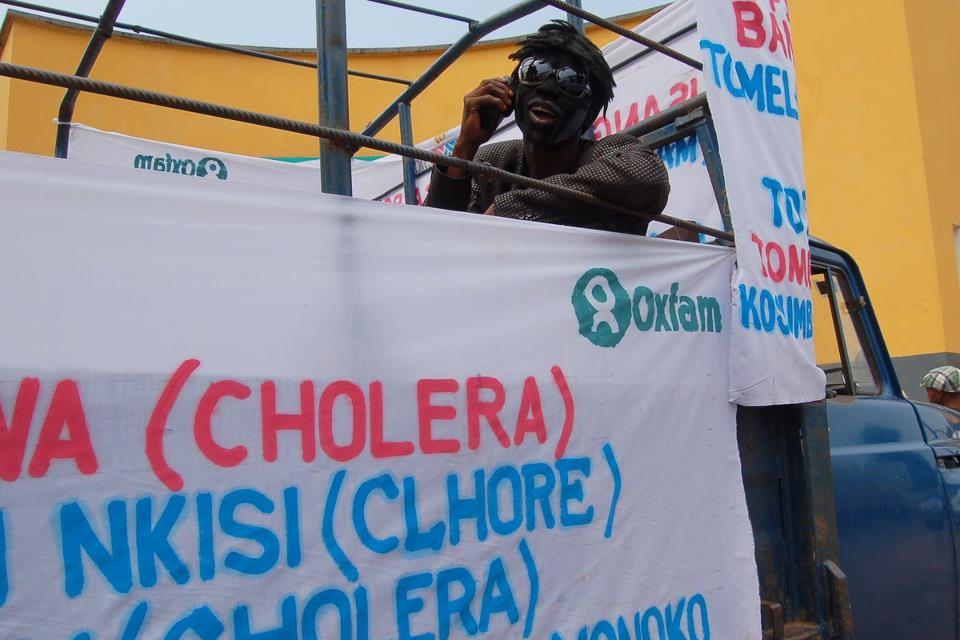
An Oxfam cholera awareness-raising campaign in Mbandaka, Democratic Republic of Congo

In October 2005, an article in the magazine New Internationalist described Oxfam as a "Big International Non-Government Organisation (BINGO)", having a corporate-style, undemocratic internal structure” and also alleging Oxfam was “addressing the symptoms rather than the causes of international poverty – especially by acquiescing to neoliberal economics and even taking over roles conventionally filled by national governments. Similar criticism came from Red Pepper magazine in July 2005 and Katherine Quarmby in the New Statesman in May 2005. The latter article detailed growing rifts between Oxfam and other organisations within the Make Poverty History movement.

In a 2011 Columbia Journalism Review article, journalist Karen Rothmyer accused NGOs in general and Oxfam in particular of being unduly influenced by the priorities of the media, of providing inaccurate information to the press ("stories featuring aid projects often rely on dubious numbers provided by the organisations") and of perpetuating negative stereotypes which "have the potential to influence policy". She drew on earlier work by journalist Lauren Gelfand, who had taken a year away from journalism to work for Oxfam: "A lot of what Oxfam does is to sustain Oxfam"; and Linda Polman, author of the Crisis Caravan: "Aid organisations are businesses dressed up like Mother Theresa". In 2015, Omaar and de Waal, in Food and Power in Sudan, commented, "the 1990s have seen growing pressure for humanitarian institutions to become more accountable. There has been a succession of reviews of operations, growing in independence and criticism."

=== Accusations of overrepresenting poverty ===
==== 2015 study on net worth inequality ====
Oxfam released a study in January 2015 predicting by late 2016 the top 1% of income earners globally would own more than half of the world's assets.

This study was criticized as overestimating wealth inequality and ignoring other indicators of quality of life. Due to how Oxfam calculated personal assets and net worth, high income earners in developed nations who also have more debts than assets (such as someone under age 35 with a large home mortgage) were depicted as poorer than rural subsistence farmers with no debts and no assets — though the developed nations’ inhabitants had markedly higher standards of living overall.

==== 2022 report on poverty increasing ====
Oxfam's 2022 "Profiting from Pain" report claims that 1 million people fall into poverty every 33 hours. Journalist Noah Smith observed that the report depended on incorrectly cited numbers, allegedly from the World Bank, claiming that 198 million people would become poor in 2022. However, the number in question represented the worst-case increase in global poverty between 2020 and 2022, rather than the increase for 2022 alone, which was according to the World Bank likely closer to 12 million. Further, the Oxfam data added an additional claim of 65 million people further falling into poverty due to the Russian invasion of Ukraine, in spite of the fact that the World Bank already considers the war in Ukraine when making its poverty projections.

=== Bookshops ===
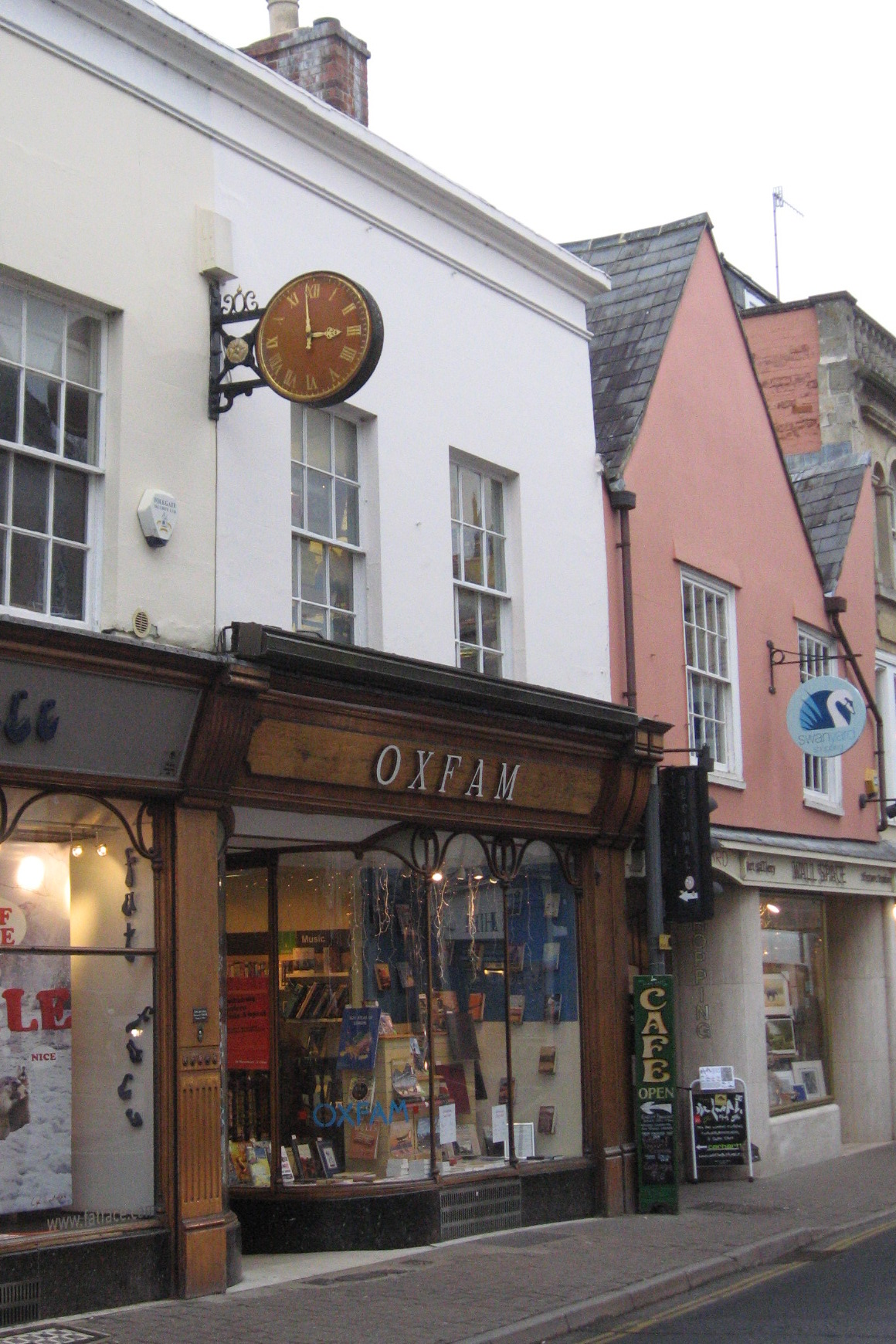
Oxfam shop in Cirencester, England

In 2010 Oxfam was criticized by independent bookshops and the booksellers association for aggressively expanding its specialist bookshops, using tactics more often associated with multi-national corporations. The charity's critics claim its expansion has come at the expense of independent secondhand book sellers and other charity shops in many areas of the UK.

=== Staff sexual misconduct in Haiti and Chad ===
In February 2018 an investigation by The Times newspaper found Oxfam conducted an inquiry concerning sexual exploitation, the downloading of pornography, and bullying and intimidation by staff. Three men were allowed to resign and an additional four were sacked.

A 2011 confidential report by Oxfam had found "a culture of impunity" among some staff in Haiti, including questionable sexual behaviors. The report concluded: “it cannot be ruled out that any of the prostitutes were under-aged". Among the staff who were permitted to resign was the charity's Belgian country director, Roland Van Hauwermeiren. In the internal report, Van Hauwermeiren admitted using prostitutes at a villa whose rent was paid for by Oxfam with charitable funds. Oxfam's chief executive at the time, Dame Barbara Stocking, offered Hauwermeiren "a phased and dignified exit" because sacking him risked "potentially serious implications" for the charity's work and reputation. Allegations were also circulated by the Daily Mail at this time regarding sexual harassment in Oxfam shops in Britain.

Oxfam did not report any of the incidents to the Haitian authorities, because "it was extremely unlikely that any action would be taken". Although Oxfam disclosed details of the incident to the Charity Commission, the Commission revealed after The Times investigation that it had never received Oxfam's final investigation report and Oxfam "did not detail the precise allegations, nor did it make any indication of potential sexual crimes involving minors". A spokesperson for the Commission commented that: "We will expect the charity to provide us with the assurance that it has learnt lessons from past incidents". Oxfam later explained it had not given details to the Commission beyond "inappropriate sexual behaviour" because using prostitutes in Haiti was not illegal.

In response to the Haiti revelations, Liz Truss, the chief secretary to the Treasury, described the reports as "shocking, sickening and depressing". Oxfam issued a statement in which it asserted "Oxfam treats any allegation of misconduct extremely seriously. As soon as we became aware of a range of allegations – including of sexual misconduct – in Haiti in 2011 we launched an internal investigation. The investigation was announced publicly and staff members were suspended pending the outcome". The statement also added that the allegations "that under-age girls may have been involved were not proven". Speaking on the BBC's Andrew Marr Show, the international development secretary, Penny Mordaunt, said Oxfam had failed in its "moral leadership" over the "scandal". Mordaunt also said that Oxfam did "absolutely the wrong thing" by not reporting the detail of the allegations to the government. The incident led the International Development Committee of the UK Parliament to issue a report about sexual harassment and abuse in the humanitarian sector on 31 July 2018. Former supporters who withdrew from their association with Oxfam at this time included Minnie Driver.

Oxfam had also been aware that Van Hauwermeiren and other staff had repeatedly used prostitutes at the Oxfam team house in Chad in 2006, and was also aware one of Oxfam's staff members had been fired for his behaviour. Oxfam's deputy chief executive Penny Lawrence resigned, taking full responsibility and acknowledging that "(c)oncerns were raised about the behaviour of staff in Chad as well as Haiti that we failed to adequately act upon". CEO Mark Goldring also resigned a few months later. New allegations were made by senior staffer Helen Evans, who had been the lead investigator of organizational sexual misconduct between 2012 and 2015. A commentator in the medical journal The Lancet, Mishal S. Khan, argued the Oxfam sex scandal was "not surprising." It was reported the scandal cost Oxfam £16 million in unrestricted funding, and job losses and closures of some Oxfam shops were admitted to be likely in consequence.

=== Internal training materials ===
In June 2021, The Telegraph reported that leaked staff training documents claimed that "privileged white women" and "mainstream feminism" were supporting the root causes of sexual violence by wanting "bad men" fired or imprisoned, and adding that reporting sexual assault "legitimises criminal punishment, harming black and other marginalised people." In the same month The Times reported that staff at the organisation being angered by an "offensive and divisive" staff survey that took aim at "whiteness" as well as asking them to state if they were anti-racist.

In March 2023 further controversy followed the publication of Oxfam's "Inclusive Language Guide", which included apologising for its use of English given that it was the language of a "colonising nation" and making suggestions to the reader such as using "parent" as opposed to "mother" and "father" or avoid the phrase "stand with" for potentially being regarded as ableist to those who cannot stand. Oxfam defended the guide, in part stating that "this guide is not prescriptive, it is intended to help authors communicate with the diverse range of people with which we work."

=== 2023 Pride Month video ===
An animated video posted by Oxfam International in June 2023 for Pride Month attracted criticism, particularly from anti-trans activists, for its inclusion of a caricatured group of people representing "hate groups" that included one wearing a button badge labelled "TERF" and described by some critics to resemble J. K. Rowling. The scene was also criticised for using "racial stereotyping" for its "depiction of an Asian man".

The video was soon taken down and replaced with a revised version, replacing the three figures with a montage of social media images and the term "TERF", and an apology stating that "Oxfam believes that all people should be able to make decisions which affect their lives, enjoy their rights and live a life free of discrimination and violence, including people from LGBTQIA+ communities. In efforts to make an important point about the real harm caused by transphobia, we made a mistake. ... There was no intention by Oxfam or the film-makers for this slide to have portrayed any particular person or people."

=== Low pay for UK staff ===
In December 2023, the trade union Unite announced that hundreds of UK-based employees in Oxfam's shops and offices would undertake 17 days of strikes over low pay. This was the first strike in the organisation's 81-year history, and was arranged in response to double-digit real-term declines in wages for UK-based staff that, it claimed, left some of the lowest paid employees unable to cover the cost of basic necessities. The strike was later suspended following a revised pay offer.

== Awards and nominations ==
In January 2013, Oxfam was nominated for the Charity of the Year award at the British Muslim Awards.

== See also ==
- 2007–08 world food price crisis
- Fati N'zi-Hassane
- Global Hunger Index
- Integrated Food Security Phase Classification
- Millennium Development Goals (Goal 1)
- Make Trade Fair
- Ox-Tales
- Universal Declaration on the Eradication of Hunger and Malnutrition (1974)
