= Alan Pim =

Sir Alan William Pim (1871–1958) was a British colonial administrator, a specialist in economic and financial issues.

== Early life ==
He was born at Foxrock into an Irish Quaker family of Monkstown, Dublin, to James Pim and his wife Elizabeth Fayle Evans, daughter of the Dublin Quaker physician John Evans (died 1873); James Howard Pim (1862–1934), accountant and art collector in South Africa, was his elder brother. He was educated at Bootham School and attended Trinity College, Dublin from 1889, and Leipzig University. He took first place in the Indian Civil Service entrance examination in 1894.

== India ==
Pim arrived in India at the end of 1895. His first position was at Bareilly, where he was assistant magistrate and collector. In 1897 he moved to Shahjahanpur, where he had the same roles. In 1898 he had a period as private secretary to Sir James La Touche who was Lieutenant Governor of the North-Western Provinces; and then was a settlement officer. In 1898 he competed in the Kadir Cup pig-sticking event.

In the wake of the Punjab Land Alienation Act, 1900, Pim was involved as an administrator in Punjab Province. He wrote to his brother Howard, giving a rationale for government limitation of land sales. The validity of the Punjab precedent became a matter of debate in the 1930s, in Zanzibar with Frank Arthur Stockdale and Richard Rankine doubting that line as held by C. F. Strickland, and in South Africa for Howard Pim's ideas.

In 1910 Pim joined the Legislative Council of the North-Western Provinces, and in 1910 its Board of Revenue. From 1912 to 1917 he acted as a Secretary to the Government of India. He was made Divisional Commissioner, and in 1925 returned to the Board of Revenue. He acted from the end of 1928 in the United Provinces as a member of its Executive Council. Ultimately, in 1929, he was acting as a finance member of the Government of India.

Pim retired in July 1930.

== Retirement activities ==
For the Colonial Office, Pim undertook a series of reports. It began with one on Swaziland, now Eswatini, in 1932.

In the case in 1933 of the Bechuanaland protectorate, now Botswana, Pim was following up concerns raised in the report of 1932 by Edward Samuel Bourn Tagart. Pim reported that the "Masarwa" (San peoples) had a status "which could hardly be distinguished from slavery". Josiah Wedgwood asked in the House of Commons on 10 December 1935 about the implementation of Pim's recommendations for economic support for development, and Douglas Hacking replied that some funds had been allocated to Bechuanaland. When Arthur Creech Jones raised the subject of the Masarwa in the House of Commons on 12 July 1938, Lord Stanley replied for the government. He stated that the leadership of Ngwato tribe was acting to grant equal rights, and that the League of Nations Advisory Committee of Experts on Slavery had raised doubt on the description of the Masarwa status as slavery.

In parallel, and with the acknowledged help of William George Ballinger (1892–1974) and Margaret Ballinger née Hodgson, Pim was reporting on Basutoland, now Lesotho. He concluded in 1935 that erosion was the most pressing problem for the colonial administation, a view with which Jan Smuts concurred. The report completed a survey of the High Commission Territories of South Africa. This work, and the writings of Margery Perham, had an impact on public opinion, in the political climate created by the Status of the Union Act, 1934. J. B. M. Hertzog had started negotiations with J. H. Thomas in 1934 on a transfer of administrative control of the Territories to the Union of South Africa.

Pim joined the six-member Colonial Development Advisory Committee in 1935. Perham commented, of a 1936 report on taxation in Kenya,

Like all Sir Alan Pim's reports on public finance, this contains a great deal of information about the structure of government.

One recommendation was implemented that year, namely an income tax on European settlers. This report involved a visit to Kenya, with an agricultural expert. There Pim met the coffee promoter Russell Wollen. His recommendations cut across the approach to coffee as a cash crop of Philip Cunliffe-Lister, Secretary of State for the Colonies at the time; and in two years exports of coffee doubled. In fact issues of soil retrogression and degradation in Kenya were surfacing at the time. John Lonsdale comments that at this period "soil conservation split the official mind", between state action, and ecologically-informed development. In 1939 the soil scientists Graham Vernon Jacks and Robert Orr Whyte were formulating the white man's burden as coming to terms with "the soil and plant world".

In July 1941 Pim spoke at a conference run in Oxford by the Fabian Colonial Bureau, on The Colonies, the War and the Future. The Bureau was an initiative of Margaret Cole, Rita Hinden and Leonard Woolf, with Hinden acting as secretary. Others involved as speakers were Arthur Creech Jones, Graham Vernon Jacks, William Miller Macmillan, Una Marson and Margaret Wrong.In October 1942 he became a founding member of the Oxford Committee for Famine Relief, later Oxfam, and its treasurer. Other founding members were: Henry Gillett, another Quaker in Oxford; Dick Milford the convener who became chairman and his father-in-law Nowell Smith; Gilbert Murray and his wife Mary; and Leo Liepmann. Cecil Jackson-Cole became its secretary. Commenting on the Quaker milieu, including Liepmann and Jackson-Cole, Finlow gives the caveat that "Little is known about Pim's religious affiliations in his adult years".

== Works ==
- A Monograph on Woollen Fabrics in the North-Western Provinces and Oudh (1898)
- Report on Russian Timber Camps (1931), with Edward Bateson, former colonial judge in Egypt, for the Anti-slavery and Aborigines Protection Society. Preface by Stanley Buckmaster, 1st Viscount Buckmaster. The authors were assisted by Reginald Thomas Herbert Fletcher, a former intelligence officer. The conclusion that "state slavery" existed in the Soviet Union was later contested by W. P. Coates.
- The Financial and Economic History of the African Tropical Territories (1940), based on Pim's Beit Lectures in Oxford, 1938.
- The Economic Development of Africa (1944), addressto the Annual Meeting of the Anti-slavery and Aborigines Protection Society.
- Colonial Agricultural Production. The Contribution made by Native Peasants and by Foreign Enterprise (1946), published for the Royal Institute of International Affairs, with a preface by Gilbert Ernest Hubbard. It was reviewed by Harold Tempany, Julius Herman Boeke and James Maddison Tinley.

== Awards and honours ==
Pim was made Companion of the Order of the Indian Empire in 1918, then Companion of the Order of the Star of India in 1926, and Knight Commander of the Order of the Indian Empire in 1929. He was knighted as KBE in 1935.

== Learned societies ==
In India Pim was a member of the Royal Asiatic Society and the Punjab Historical Society. He addressed the Committee on Applied Anthropology of the Royal Anthropological Institute on Northern Rhodesia; and acted as President of the Oxford University Anthropological Society.

== Family ==
Pim married in 1916 Norah Gordon Scott, daughter of the late John Scott and his wife Edgeworth Leonora Hill, daughter of Frederic Hill.

== Legacy ==
Papers by Pim are held by the Centre of South Asian Studies in Cambridge.
