= James Joseph Mallon =

British economist and political activist

James Joseph Mallon CH JP

Warden of Toynbee Hall
- In office 1919–1954
- Preceded by: John St George Currie Heath
- Succeeded by: Arthur Eustace Morgan

Personal details
- Born: 24 December 1874 Chorlton, UK
- Died: 12 April 1961 (aged 86)
- Education: Victoria University of Manchester

James Joseph Mallon, CH JP (24 December 1874 – 12 April 1961) was a British economist and political activist.

== Life ==
Born in Chorlton near Manchester, Mallon became an apprentice jeweller and joined the Shop Assistants' Union. He studied at the Victoria University of Manchester, and also became very active in the Ancoats Settlement. In 1903, he joined the Independent Labour Party and the Fabian Society, and from 1905 he served a year on the executive of his union.

Mallon moved to London in 1906 to work at the Toynbee Hall settlement, and in addition became secretary of the National League to Establish a Minimum Wage. He also championed the Trade Boards Act, 1909, and subsequently became a member of thirteen trade boards. He became a friend of the journalist and editor, Alfred George Gardiner, who promoted the same causes in The Daily News.

During World War I, he was appointed as Commissioner for Industrial Unrest, and following the war, he became Warden of Toynbee Hall, holding the post until 1954. These years in which he held the wardenship are judged by historians and residents alike to be the "most successful" in the Settlement's history. He was also active in the Workers' Educational Association and Workers' Travel Association, and wrote extensively on economic matters for various newspapers and also pamphlets. He stood for Parliament as a Labour Party candidate at Saffron Walden in 1918 and Watford in 1922 and 1923, but was never elected.

During World War II, he was chairman of the Friendly Aliens Protection Committee, a group dedicated to the interests of refugees from enemy nations, including, in particular, Jews.

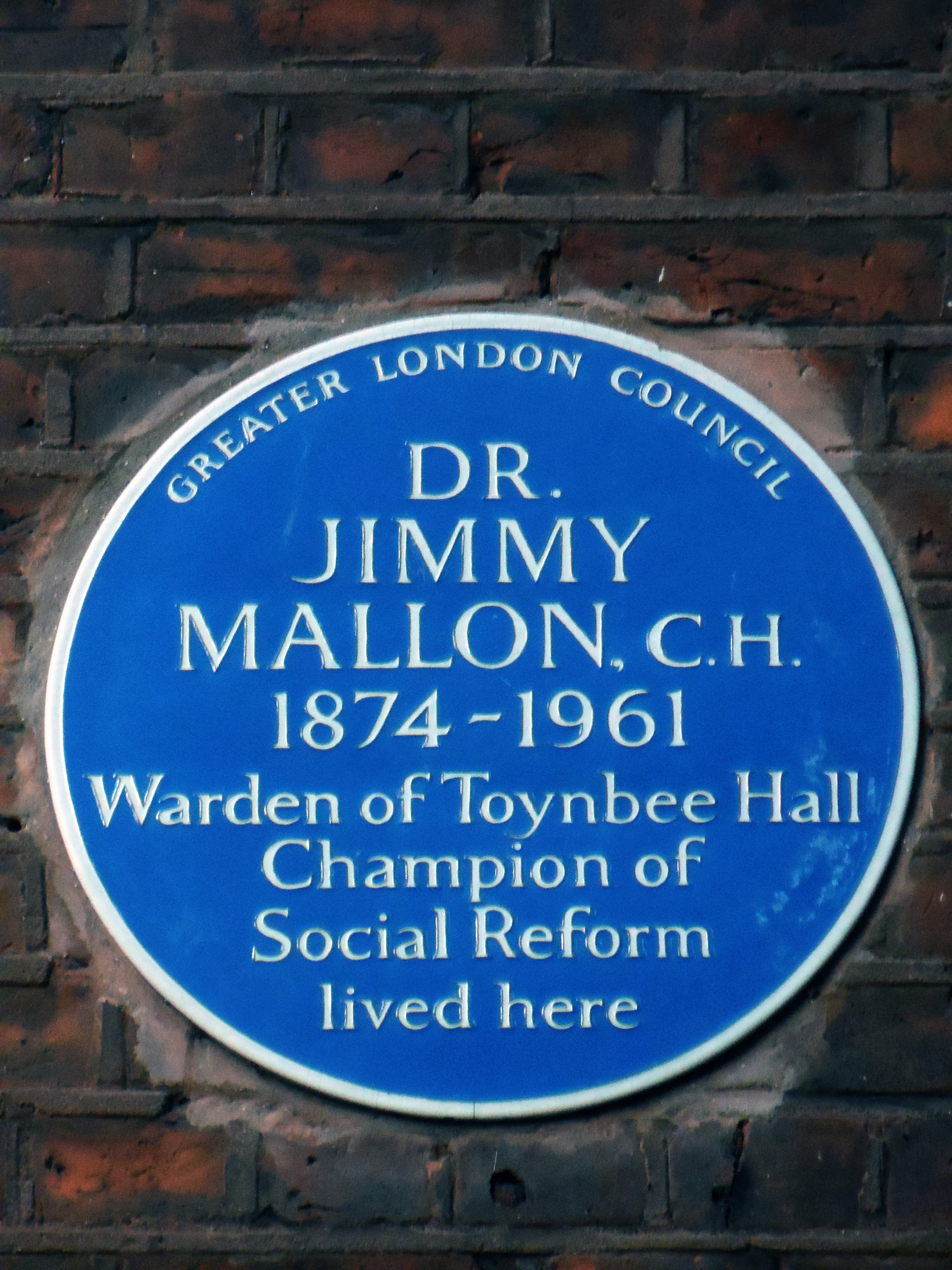
Commemorative blue plaque to Mallon on the front of Toynbee Hall

== Personal life ==
In 1921 Mallon married Stella Gardiner, the daughter of his friend Alfred.

== Honours and commemoration ==
In 1939, Mallon was appointed a Member of the Order of the Companions of Honour. He is commemorated by a Greater London Council blue plaque mounted in 1984 on the front of Toynbee Hall.
