= Toynbee Hall =

Settlement movement house in London

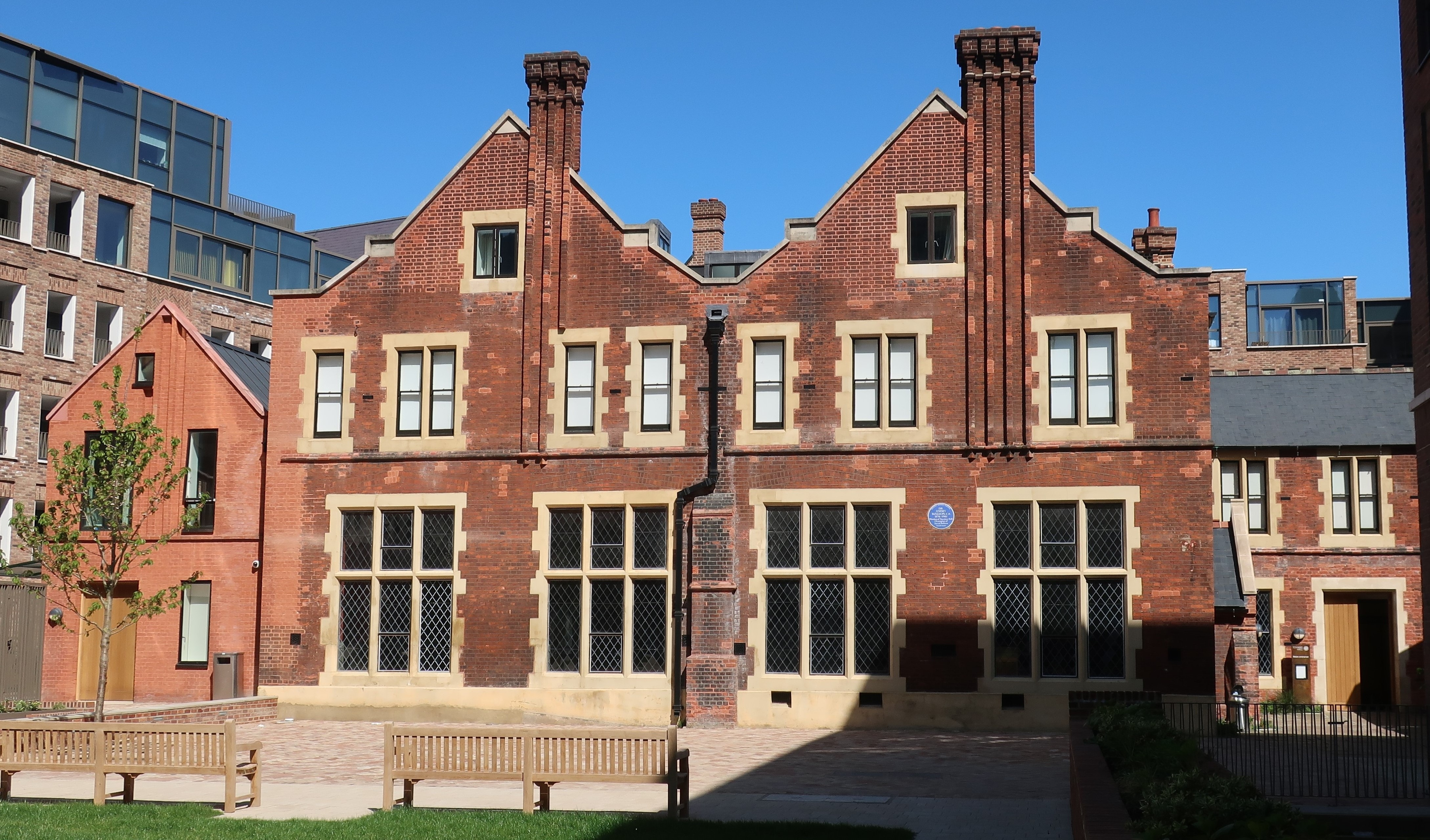
- Named after: Arnold Toynbee
- Formation: 1884; 142 years ago
- Founder: Henrietta and Samuel Barnett
- Purpose: Social reform
- Location: 28 Commercial Street, London, E1 6LS
- Coordinates: 51°30′58″N 0°4′21″W
- Warden: Rebecca Sycamore
- Chairman: Stephen Burns
- Website: https://www.toynbeehall.org.uk

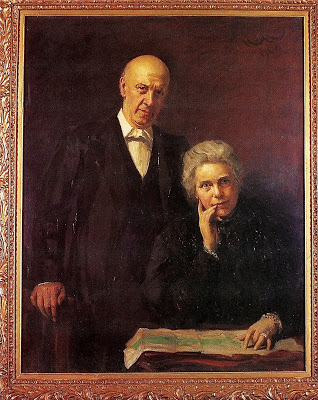
Samuel and Henrietta Barnett, founders of Toynbee Hall: a portrait by Hubert Herkomer

Toynbee Hall is a charitable institution that works to address the causes and impacts of poverty in the East End of London and elsewhere. Established in 1884, it is based in Commercial Street, Spitalfields, and was the first university-affiliated institution of the worldwide settlement movement—a reformist social agenda that strove to get the rich and poor to live more closely together in an interdependent community. It was founded by Henrietta and Samuel Barnett in the economically depressed East End, and was named in memory of their friend and fellow reformer, Oxford historian Arnold Toynbee, who had died the previous year.

== History ==
Shortly after their marriage in 1873, Samuel Barnett and his wife, Henrietta, moved to the Whitechapel district of the East End of London. Barnett was vicar of St Jude's church, where he saw poverty at first hand. Late-Victorian Whitechapel was known for its overcrowded living spaces and high criminal activity. In the area of Whitechapel alone, the mortality rate for children under the age of five was around 60% mostly due to the tight living conditions. Charles Booth, another social reformer, mapped London according to eight different social classes, finding that around 70% of people living in the East End were in the lowest three classes.

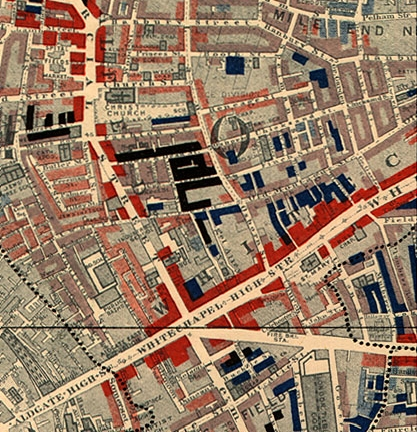
Map of Whitechapel from Charles Booth's Labour and Life of the People (1889). Residential buildings are coloured to represent the economic class of the occupants: Yellow ("Upper-middle and Upper classes, Wealthy"), red ("Lower middle class – Well-to-do middle class"), pink ("Fairly comfortable good ordinary earnings"), blue ("Intermittent or casual earnings"), and black ("lowest class...occasional labourers, street sellers, loafers, criminals and semi-criminals"). Toynbee Hall (not named) stands towards the southern end of Commercial Street.

Whitechapel was also a place where many different immigrants settled. The Great Famine of Ireland in the 19th century led to many Irish settling in Whitechapel. Also, many Jewish immigrants settled in Whitechapel after fleeing from persecution in Western Europe at the time.

The Barnetts used their roles in the parish to improve the Whitechapel area. They built a church library, introduced art exhibits, brought university lecturers in, and took their parishioners on excursions to the homes of the wealthy and to universities. The Barnetts also tried to encourage officials to improve sanitation and housing and to build more playgrounds and washhouses. However, the attempts the Barnetts made with the parish had little effect on the East End community as a whole. The parish did not reach everyone that lived in the East End. Many of the people did not involve themselves with the established church. In an effort to improve the wellbeing of the community, Barnett had the idea of sharing knowledge and culture. His proposal was to have university students come as volunteers to share their knowledge: the students would be able to help the poor, and at the same time witness poverty at first hand, and potentially develop solutions for it.

In 1883, Barnett gave a lecture at St John's College, Oxford to gain support for his idea. Barnett was able to gather enough support and a committee called the "University Settlement of East London" was set up by Oxford. With these ideas and the support of universities, Barnett founded Toynbee Hall, the first settlement house in the world. Toynbee Hall first opened its doors on Christmas Eve in 1884, initially housing 17 individuals and expanding to 30 in later years. Samuel Barnett was named as the first warden of the hall and Oxford and Cambridge university students came to work at the hall.

Toynbee Hall was named after social reformer Arnold Toynbee (1852–1883) who was a tutor at Balliol College, Oxford and a close friend to Barnett. He specialised in political economy and Indian studies and helped popularise the term "Industrial Revolution". Toynbee died at the age of 30 in 1883, shortly after apologising to the working class for middle class neglect and pledging to their service. Although he contributed no part to the establishment that bears his name today, the Hall was built on ideas based on philosopher T.H. Green's, “Positive Freedom”, that heavily influenced Toynbee himself. Toynbee translated Green's ideas into "Philosophical Idealism" which is what guided the principles of the Hall, where individuals learned to develop themselves alongside others in the pursuit of the common good. Barnett believed the hall to be a small-scale model of civil society, where residents fulfilled their civic duty and natural capacity to improve morally and rationally while working with the poor.

By 1910 more settlement houses were founded in the United Kingdom in the areas of Manchester, Glasgow, Edinburgh, Dundee, Birmingham, Liverpool, and elsewhere in London; as well as in Holland, France, Germany, Sweden, Denmark, Finland, Austria, and the United States. In 1911 the leaders of the social settlement movement founded the National Federation of Settlements. One of the best known settlement houses that was inspired after a visit to Toynbee Hall is Hull House in Chicago, founded by Jane Addams and Ellen Gates Starr in 1889.

Over time Toynbee Hall implemented many different educational community programmes. At its opening, Toynbee Hall introduced University Extension Society lectures. These lectures were taught by university professors. Some residents of the Hall also taught extension classes themselves, in subjects such as literature, history, natural history, and mathematics. At the programme's peak, in the 1890s, classes were taught in over 134 topics including; literature, zoology, ethics, philosophy, etc. In order to further promote education, 36 societies or clubs were created in different areas, such as, music, art, history, and science. One of these societies was founded in 1889 and was called the "Toynbee Travellers" where trips were arranged for local schoolteachers. This group was created after a group of Toynbee Hall residents travelled to Belgium in 1887. Toynbee Hall began hosting Smoking Room Debates in which community members and invited speakers would come to debate issues of the day. This tradition continued for over twenty years. The Hall also invited the middle-class to “Popular lectures" held on Saturday nights to hear speakers such as Charles Booth, H.H. Asquith, Tom Mann, and Oscar Wilde. In 1899, the Poor Man's Lawyer service was introduced. This program gives free legal services to those who cannot afford it, and continues to the present day.

== The settlement movement ==
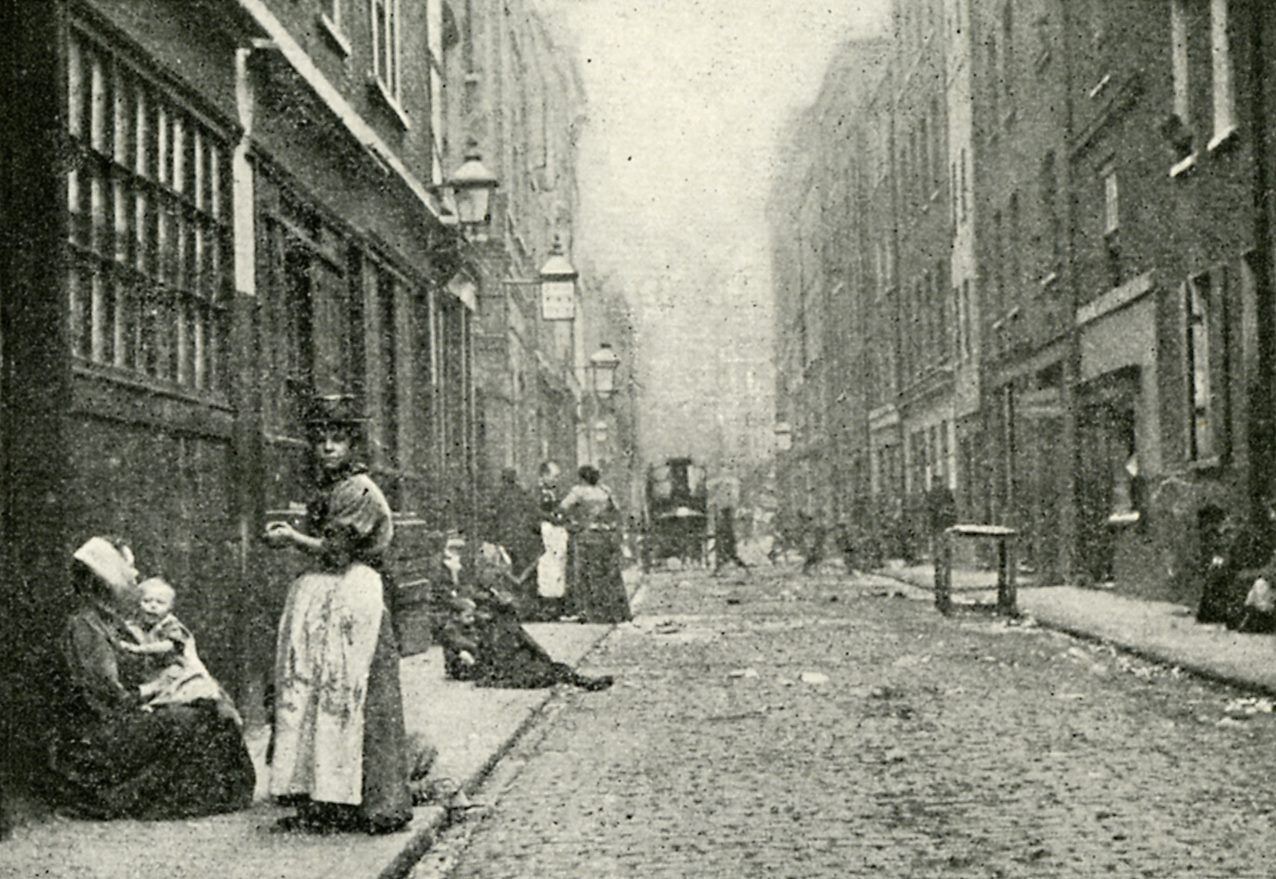
An East End street in 1902 (Dorset Street, Spitalfields), photographed for Jack London's book The People of the Abyss

The international settlement movement began at Toynbee Hall, where a community centre was formed that attracted university students who wished to live or "settle" among the underprivileged in London's economically depressed East End. They came, according to Samuel Barnett, "to learn, as much as to teach, to receive as much as to give". As at most settlement houses, its social workers—students from Oxford and Cambridge Universities, among others—resided at Toynbee Hall and sought thereby to get to know their neighbors and their needs on a more intimate, personal level.

Toynbee Hall rejected the concept of a community centre as a location for Christian proselytising—as seen in the efforts of the Salvation Army. The Hall was set up as an educational space no with religious or political affiliation, where it remained separate from both Church and the Poor Law system. Its residents were therefore not missionaries or almoners but “settlers” who came to live and learn among the poor. The Hall’s non-religious character made it especially appealing to Whitechapel's Jewish residents. By 1900, about a quarter of the students in its university extension courses were Jewish.

From the beginning, it was non-sectarian and welcomed people of all faiths, despite having been founded by a Church of England cleric. It saw its purpose as more educational than charitable, in a missionary sense. Gertrude Himmelfarb lists some of the activities offered by Toynbee Hall in a typical month: "evening classes on arithmetic, writing, drawing, citizenship, chemistry, nursing, and music (...); afternoon classes for girls on dressmaking, writing and composition, geography, bookkeeping, needlework, hygiene, reading and recitation, French, singing, cooking, and swimming; and evening sessions devoted to the discussion of legal principles and current social issues".

By 1900 there were over 100 settlements in the United States and across the UK, and in 1911 the leaders of the social settlement movement founded the National Federation of Settlements.

== Current activity ==
Today, Toynbee Hall provides a range of programmes and activities, broadly broken down into: youth, the elderly, financial inclusion, debt, advice, free legal advice and community engagement.

Each year over 400 volunteers help to deliver the charity's services.

In 2006 Toynbee Hall launched Capitalise, a pan-London free debt advice service to support 20,000 people a year with their money worries. In April 2019 this service was rebranded as Debt Free London.

In 2007 the Toynbee Studios opened in part of the building offering dance and media studios and a theatre.

== Buildings ==
Toynbee Hall, the original building that houses the organisation of the same name, is located in Commercial Street, Spitalfields, in the London Borough of Tower Hamlets. It was designed by Elijah Hoole in a Tudor-Gothic style, and was formally opened in January 1885. It was built on the site of a disused industrial school, and adjacent to the church of St Jude (built in 1845–46, but demolished in 1927). It was designated a Grade II listed building in 1973. The front of the building bears a Greater London Council blue plaque, erected in 1984, commemorating Jimmy Mallon, warden 1919–54.

Since its foundation, the charity has expanded from the original building into a number of extensions and other neighbouring buildings.

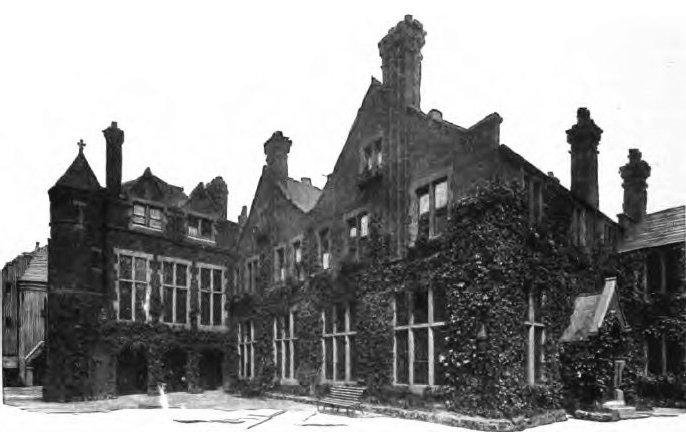
Toynbee Hall, circa 1902

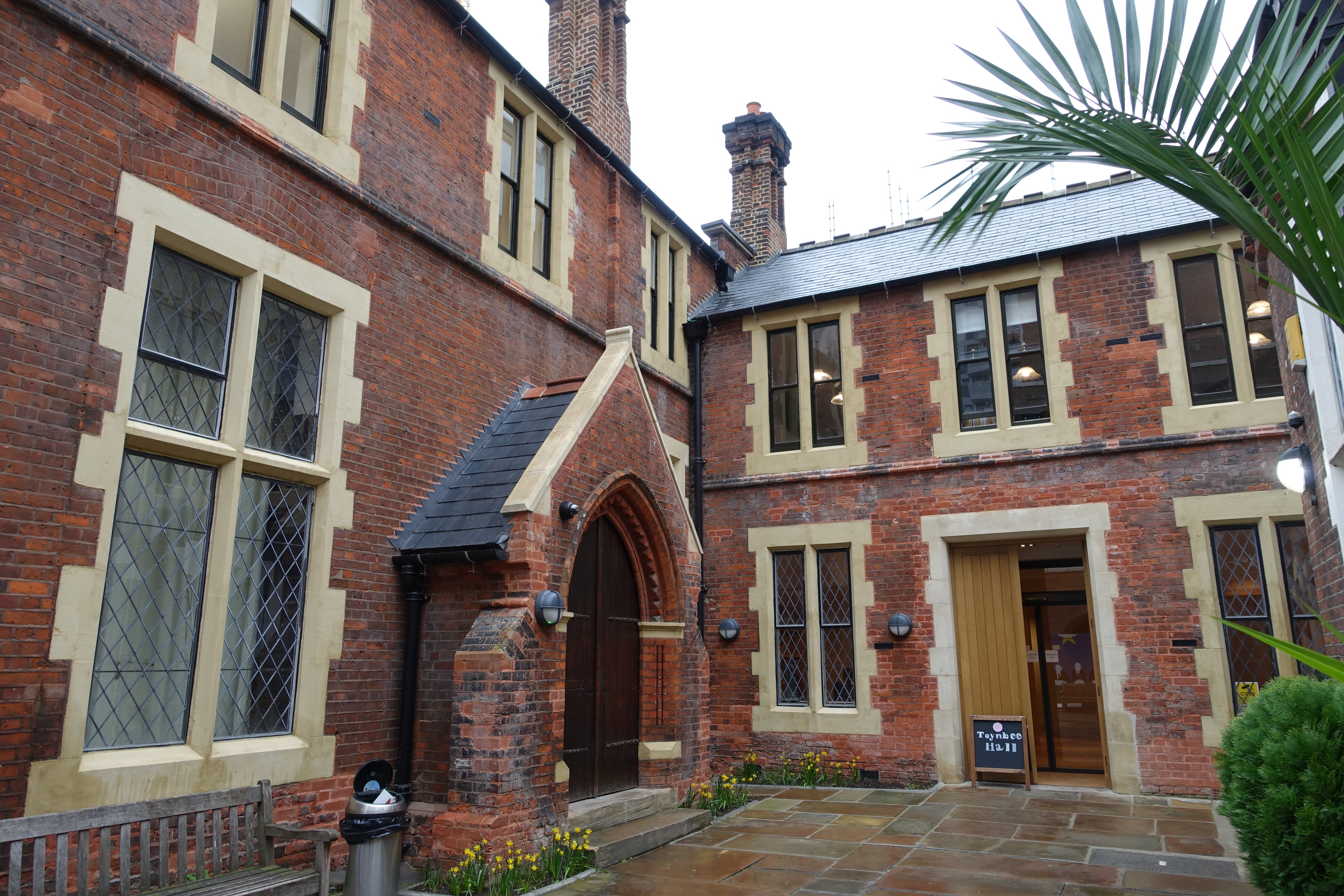
Toynbee Hall courtyard, 2019

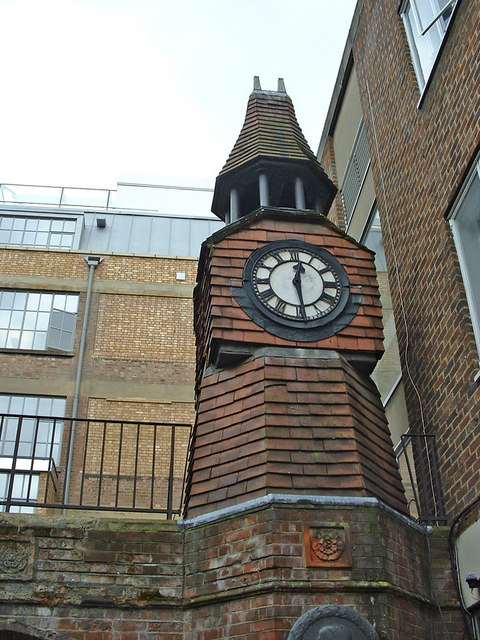
An Arts and Crafts clock tower

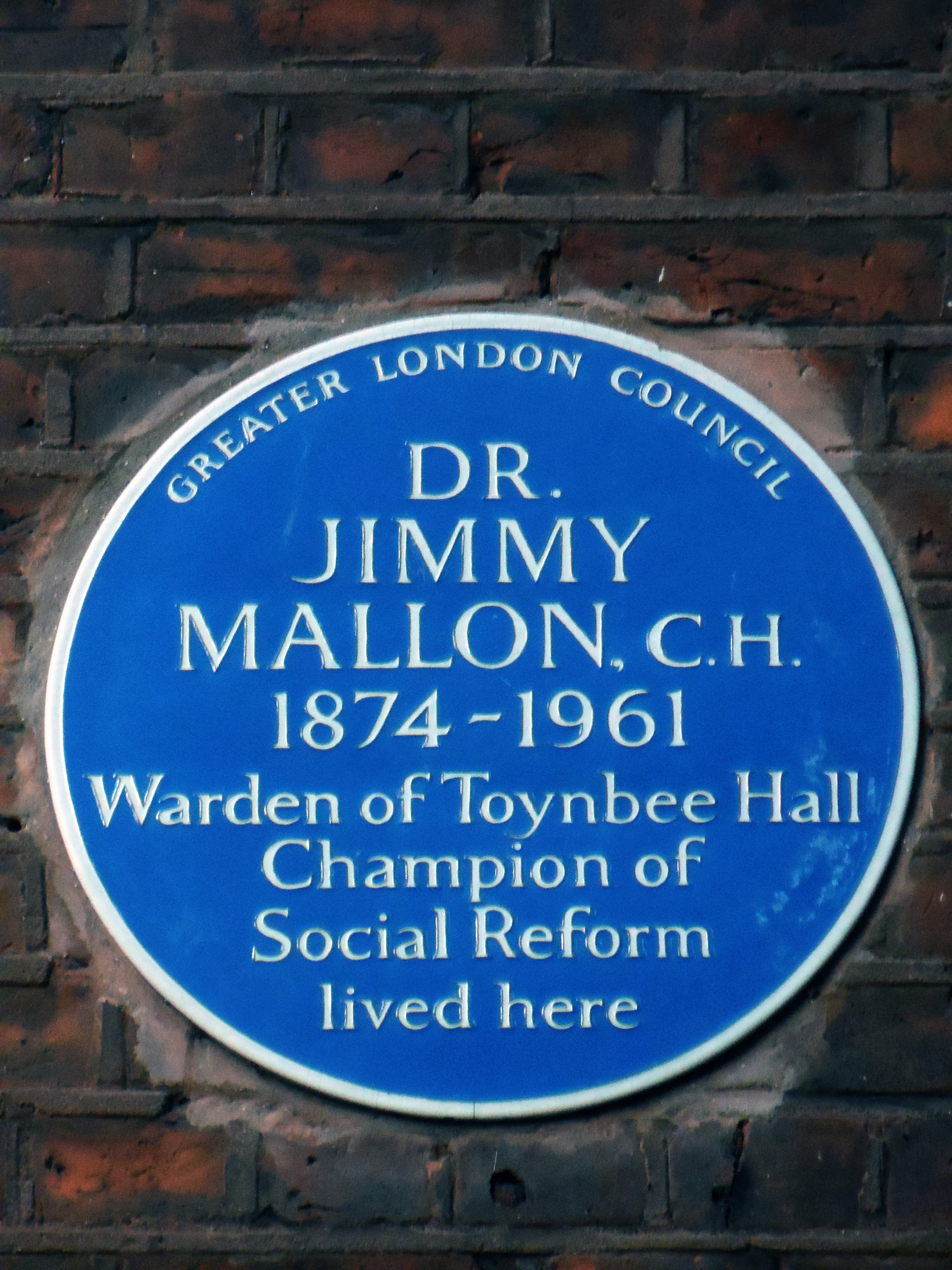
Blue plaque commemorating Jimmy Mallon

== People ==
=== Wardens ===
- 1884–1906 Samuel Barnett
- 1906–11 Thomas Edmund Harvey
- 1914-17 John St George Currie Heath
- 1919–54 James Joseph Mallon
- 1954–63 Arthur Eustace Morgan
- 1963–64 Jack Catchpool
- 1964–72 Walter Birmingham
- 1972–76 Anthony Locke
- 1977–87 Donald Piers Chesworth
- 1987–92 Alan Lee Williams OBE
- 1992–98 Alan Prescott
- 1998–2008 Revd Professor Luke Geoghegan
- 2008–17 Graham Fisher
- 2017–22 James Minton
- 2023–2026 Rebecca Sycamore
- 2026- Matt Dronfield

=== Chair of trustees ===
- 1884–96 Philip Lyttelton Gell, first chairman
- Charles Alfred Elliott
- 1911–25 Alfred Milner
- 1933–45 Cosmo Lang
- 1966 Lord Blakenham
- 1982–85 John Profumo
- 1985–90 Sir Harold Atcherley
- 1990–2002 Roger Harrison
- 2002–2009 Christopher Coombe
- 2009–2015 Ben Rowland
- 2015–2022 Julian Corner
- 2022–2026 Stephen Burns
- 2026- Alice Gac

=== Notable associated people ===
- Toynbee residents included: Clement Attlee, Margery Moore, Jerome Davis Greene and R. H. Tawney.
- William Beveridge began his career by working as Sub-Warden at Toynbee Hall from 1903 to 1905.
- Visitors to Toynbee Hall included Lenin and Guglielmo Marconi. The latter made the first public presentation of his wireless invention in Toynbee Hall on 12 December 1896.
- Lionel Ellis (1885–1970), the military historian, was an Associate Warden of Toynbee Hall after the Second World War. Between the two World Wars, he had been General Secretary of the National Council of Social Service and then Secretary of the National Fitness Council.
- John Profumo dedicated much of his time to the Hall from 1964 onwards after the Profumo affair forced him out of politics.
- Social reformers from the United States, such as Jane Addams and Gaylord Starin White, visited Toynbee Hall, which inspired their work to establish Hull House in Chicago and Union Settlement in New York City, respectively.
- Sir Nicolas Bratza, was a volunteer at Toynbee Hall's Free Legal Advice Centre in the 1970s. He went on to become the President of the European Court of Human Rights from November 2011 to October 2012. In 2014, Sir Nicolas became an Ambassador for Toynbee Hall.
- Marie-Jeanne Bassot visited Hull House, which inspired her establishment of la Résidence sociale in Levallois-Perret (France).

== Associated organisations ==
- Charles Robert Ashbee created his Guild of Handicraft whilst a resident at Toynbee Hall in the late 1880s.
- The Whitechapel Art Gallery (founded 1901) grew out of annual free art exhibitions organised by Henrietta Barnett.
- The Workers Educational Association (WEA) was founded here in 1903.
- Child Poverty Action Group was founded at a meeting held at Toynbee Hall in 1965.
- Stepney Children's Fund
