= M. W. Barley =

English historian and archaeologist (1909–1991)

Maurice Willmore Barley FSA FRHistS
- Born: 19 August 1909; Lincoln, England
- Died: 23 June 1991 (aged 81); Nottingham, England
- Spouse(s): Diana Barley, née Mabel Gladys Morgan (m. 1934)
- Children: 3
- Relatives: Arthur Eustace Morgan (father-in-law)

Academic background
- Education: University of Reading

Academic work
- Discipline: Archaeology
- Institutions: University College, Hull; University of Nottingham; Royal Commission on the Historical Monuments of England

Maurice Willmore Barley FSA FRHistS (19 August 1909 – 23 June 1991) was an English historian and archaeologist, specialising in medieval settlements and historic buildings.

== Early life and education ==
Barley was born and raised in Lincoln, in a working-class family. His father, Levi Baldwin Barley, worked in a local engineering firm and was a prominent member of the Workers' Educational Association. Barley studied history at University of Reading, taking a Dip. Ed in 1932.

== Career ==
Barley taught at a school in Grimsby, then went to work at University College, Hull in the Department of Local History. At this time he also taught local history and archaeology at adult education classes in Lindsey and East Yorkshire. Following contact with the eminent folklorist Ethel Rudkin, Barley's interest in local history intensified; his publications on the subject cover slate headstones, varieties of apple, architecture and archaeology.

During the Second World War, Barley worked for the Ministry of Information and lived in Oxfordshire. In 1946, he joined the Extra-Mural Department of the University of Nottingham, and lived at the Old Hall at North Muskham. He was Organising Tutor of the University College in Rural Nottinghamshire until 1962, in which year he became Senior Lecturer in the Department of Classics, and Reader in Archaeology in 1965. He was appointed Nottingham's first professor of Archaeology in 1971. Barley organised major excavations of the Roman fort and town at Great Casterton, Rutland, and the medieval borough at Torksey, alongside minor excavations in Nottingham and Newark. At Nottingham, he developed his interest in medieval and vernacular architecture, and read for an M.A. in the subject in 1952. He published many articles on buildings, publishing his most important book, The English Farmhouse and Cottage, in 1961. Also noteworthy was his publication A Guide to British Topographical Collections of 1974. From 1951 Barley had been actively involved in the development of the Council for British Archaeology, as a member of the Executive Committee, then as Secretary (from 1954–64). In 1966 he was appointed to the Royal Commission on the Ancient and Historical Monuments and Constructions of England. Between 1957 and 1963 he was President of the Vernacular Architecture Group and between 1972 and 1990 Chairman of the York Archaeological Trust. He was also a Vice-President of the Society of Antiquaries of London and a fellow of the Royal Historical Society.

Barley retired from the university in 1974, but remained academically active, being prominent in local and national heritage bodies and trusts, and campaigning on conservation issues. Having suffered serious illness for some years, Barley nonetheless remained correcting proofs and preparing his autobiography for publication until just before his death.

Barley's most valuable contribution to folklore is his seminal work on Plough Monday folk plays; from the 1930s through to the 1950s, he collected material, partly from or through members of his evening classes, with some work conducted for local periodicals and the BBC. His research material on the Plough Monday plays, along with other papers relating to his archaeological work, is held in the archives of the University of Nottingham in its manuscripts and special collections. Historic England hold a collection of Barley’s photographs and, photographs attributed to him are also held in the Conway Library, whose archive, of primarily architectural images, is in the process of being digitised as part of the wider Courtauld Connects project.

== Personal life ==
Barley met his future wife, Diana (born Mabel Gladys Morgan) when they were both students at University of Reading. They married in 1934 and had three children, Anthony, Simon, and Harriet. Diana was a daughter of English literature professor Arthur Eustace Morgan, who was the first principal of University College, Hull.

Barley was an active member of his local community, especially when it comes to preserving local history. While working and living in North Muskham, in 1947, he worked with members of the Local History Group to compile and gather information about the village's history. Relocating to Nottingham, Barley co-founded Nottingham Civic Society in 1962. He was also keenly involved with the Thoroton Society of Nottinghamshire, at one point serving as its Vice President and editor of its publication.

Barley died at his home in Nottingham from cancer on 23 June 1991. He was survived by his wife and their three children. Barley's autobiography, The Chiefest Grain, was posthumously published in 1993 by University of Nottingham.

== Legacy and commemoration ==
The Maurice Barley Memorial Lecture takes place annually at University of Nottingham in Barley's honour. The first lecture took place on 13 March 1993 and was delivered by Peter Addyman.

== Selected publications ==
- Archaeological papers from York presented to M.W. Barley, eds. P.V. Addyman and V.E. Black. York: York Archaeological Trust, 1984, ISBN 0950629723
- Recording Timber-Framed Buildings: An Illustrated Glossary, N W Alcock, M W Barley, P W Dixon & R A Meeson, Council for British Archaeology, 2nd edition 1989 (reprinted 2018), ISBN 9780906780732
- The English Farmhouse and Cottage, Gloucester: Sutton, 1987 (first published in 1961), 0862993717 ISBN 0862993717
- The Shell Book of English Villages, ed. John Hadfield with entries by M. W. Barley, London: Peerage, 1985, ISBN 1850520267
- European Towns: their archaeology and early history, editor & contributor, London: Council for British Archaeology, 1977, ISBN 0120788500
- The Plans and Topography of Medieval Towns in England and Wales, London: Council for British Archaeology, 1975, ISBN 9780900312335
- A Guide to British Topographical Collections, London: Council for British Archaeology, 1974, ISBN 0900312246
- The House & Home, London: Vista Books, 1963
- The Face of Britain: Lincolnshire and The Fens, B. T. Batsford, London, 1952
