= Jack Catchpool =

Jack Catchpool CBE

Warden of Toynbee Hall
- In office 1963–1964
- Preceded by: Arthur Eustace Morgan
- Succeeded by: Walter Birmingham

Personal details
- Born: 22 August 1890 Leicester, UK
- Died: 13 March 1971 (aged 80) Welwyn Garden City, UK
- Education: Sidcot School; Woodbrooke Quaker Study Centre

(Egerton) St John Pettifor Catchpool CBE (1890-1971) also known as Jack Catchpool was a social worker who served as the warden of Toynbee Hall, London. He was general secretary of the Youth Hostels Association from its inception in 1930 until 1950.

== Early life ==
He attended the Quaker institutions Sidcot School and Woodbrooke Quaker Study Centre.

== Career ==
During the First World War, Catchpool served with the Friends' Ambulance Unit in France and then with the Friends' war victims' relief committee in Russia.

After the war, he held the post of sub-warden of Toynbee Hall from 1920 to 1929. He was a member of the London County Council education committee from 1925 to 1931.

From 1930 to 1950 he served as the first general secretary of the Youth Hostels Association, and in 1938 he was elected president of the International Youth Hostel Federation. He was also the Chairman of the Romney Street Group from 1935 to 1950.

== Personal life ==
He married Ruth Allason in 1920 and they had five children.

His older brother was Corder Catchpool.

He was appointed chevalier of the Dutch Order of Orange-Nassau in 1948 and Commander of the Order of the British Empire in 1951.

He died at his home in Welwyn Garden City, Hertfordshire, on 13 March 1971.

== Publications ==
- Candles in the Darkness. London: Bannisdale Press, 1966
