= Corder Catchpool =

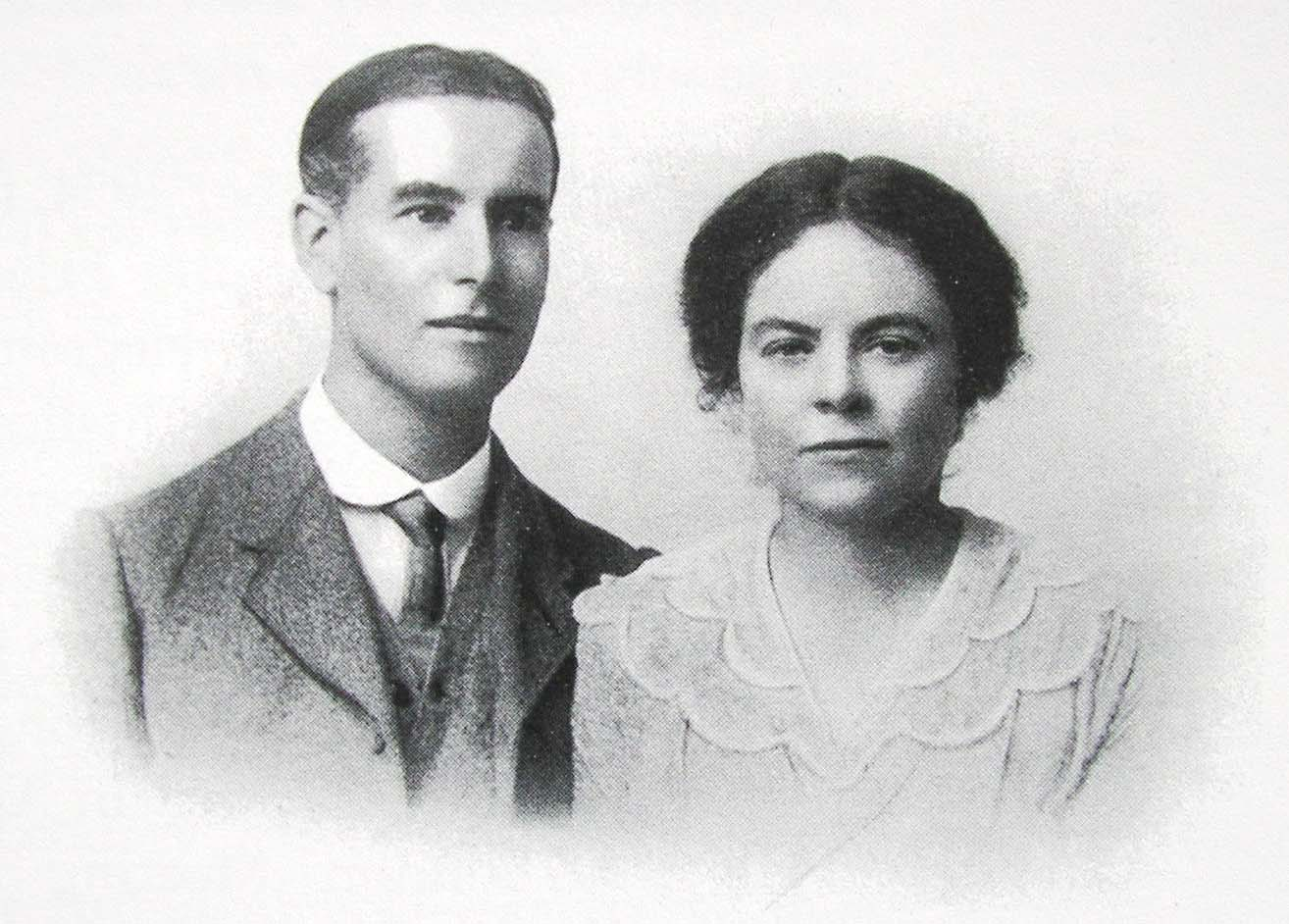
- Catchpool with his wife, Gwen (c. 1927).
- Born: July 15, 1883; Leicester, England
- Died: September 16, 1952 (aged 69)
- Children: 4
- Relatives: Jack Catchpool (brother)

Thomas "Corder" Pettifor Catchpool (15 July 1883 – 16 September 1952) was an English Quaker and pacifist engaged in relief work in Germany between 1919 and 1952.

== Career ==
He was awarded the French Mons Star for his relief work with the Friends Ambulance Unit on the Western Front (1914–1916), subsequently imprisoned in Britain for his absolutist conscientious objection to the Compulsory Military Service Act 1916. After the First World War he was released from prison and critical of the implications of the Treaty of Versailles, played an active role in reconciliation with Germany: in 1919 he assisted with the Friends War Victims Relief Committee in Berlin, an organisation that was involved in organising the feeding of up to one million children per day. Returning to Britain, he worked as a welfare coordinator for a Lancashire firm at Darwen, and was responsible for the invitation to Gandhi to visit the mill to witness the impact of the nonviolence campaign on conditions.

Between 1931 and 1936, Catchpool worked out of the Friends International Centre in Berlin to assist those who were victims of anti-Semitism and other Nazi policies. His goal from 1933 onwards was "the prevention of progressive German isolation that could only lead to war". He was arrested by the Gestapo in 1933 and temporarily detained, and he, his family, and the Quaker German Yearly Meeting were subject to ongoing surveillance and intimidation. Demonstrating his concern for human rights extended to all people, Catchpool also embarked on several missions to campaign for minority Germans who were being deprived of their civil rights in Memelland in Lithuania, and Sudetenland in Czechoslovakia. For his latter work, Catchpool received the Czech Order of the White Line, fourth class (Officer), "for the magnificent work [he had] done as representative of the Society of Friends to alleviate the sufferings of children in the distressed areas of Czechoslovakia."

As an active member of the Peace Pledge Union during the Second World War, Catchpool joined secular pacifist Vera Brittain, non-pacifist Professor Stanley Jevons, and others in setting up the Bombing Restriction Committee in 1942. The Committee called upon both Britain and Germany to stop the terror bombing of civilian targets, specifically urging the British government "to stop violating their declared policy of bombing only military objectives, and particularly to cease causing the deaths of many thousands of civilians in their homes."

In 1946, Catchpool returned to Germany to do relief work and in 1947, he and his wife Gwen were invited by the Friends Relief Service to run the Quaker Rest Home for ex-prisoners of the Nazis at Bad Pyrmont in Germany. During 1950 and 1951, Gwen and Catchpool represented the Friends Service Committee in West Berlin.

== Personal life and death ==
Catchpool was the older brother of Jack Catchpool. He was educated in schools in Leicester, Sidcot Friends' School, and at Bootham School. He raised four children with his wife Gwen (née Southall) who played an active part in his work.

An avid alpine climber, Catchpool died in a mountaineering accident on Dufourspitze, Switzerland, in 1952.
