= Arthur Eustace Morgan =

British academic (1886–1972)

Arthur Eustace Morgan FRSC
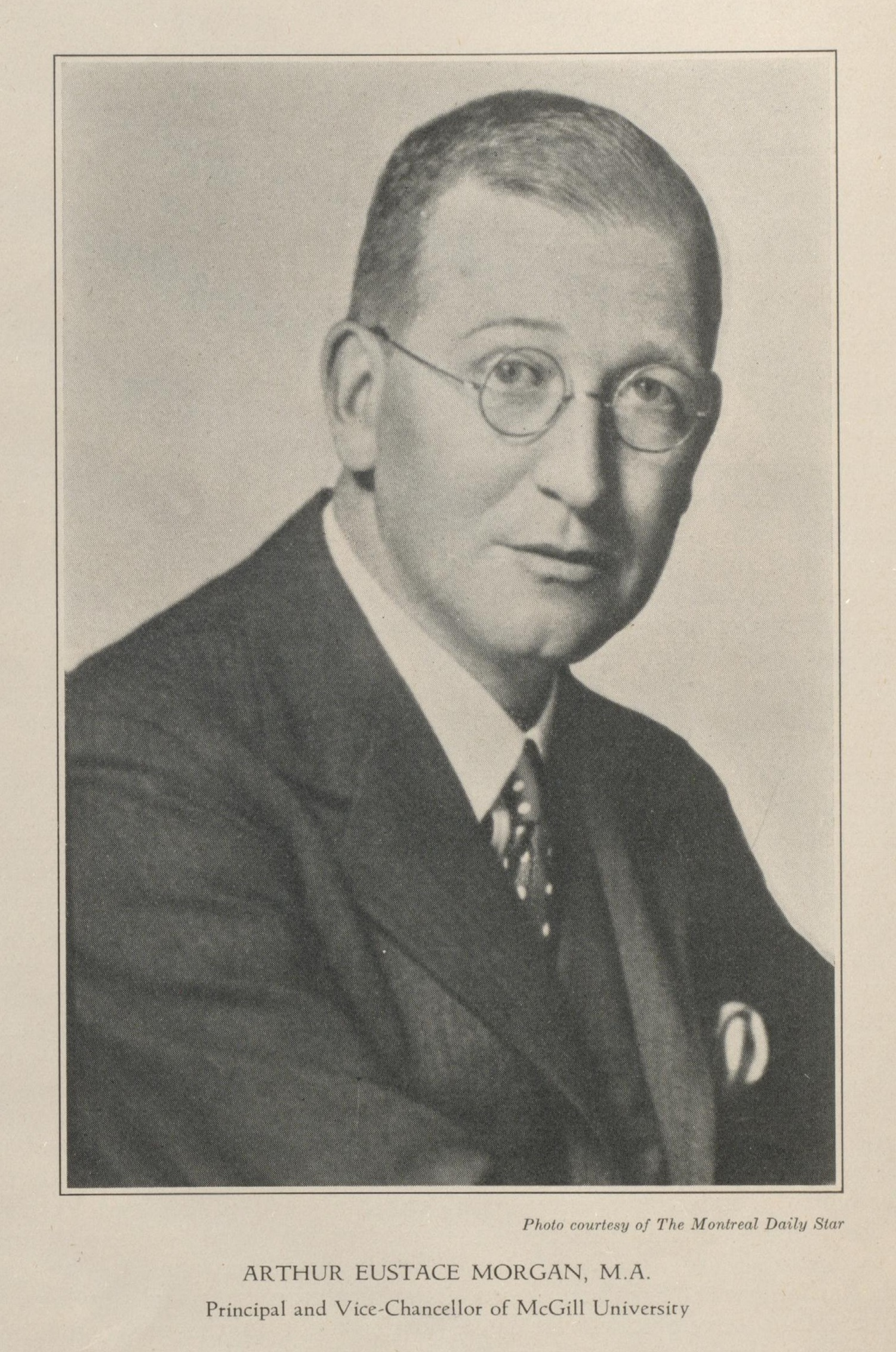

1st Principal of University College Hull
- In office 1926–1935
- Succeeded by: John H Nicholson

8th Principal of McGill University
- In office 1935–1937
- Preceded by: Arthur Currie
- Succeeded by: Lewis Williams Douglas

Warden of Toynbee Hall
- In office 1954–1963
- Preceded by: James Joseph Mallon
- Succeeded by: Jack Catchpool

Personal details
- Born: 26 July 1886 Bristol, England
- Died: 3 February 1972 (aged 85) Bristol, England
- Spouse: Mabel Eugénie Melhuish (m. 1909)
- Relations: M. W. Barley (son-in-law)
- Children: 4 daughters
- Education: University College, Bristol; Trinity College, Dublin
- Profession: Lecturer, academic administrator, civil servant

Academic work
- Discipline: English literature
- Sub-discipline: Literary history
- Institutions: Royal Albert Memorial College; University of Sheffield; University College Hull; Columbia University (visiting); University of Iowa (visiting); McGill University
- Main interests: English drama
- Notable works: Tendencies of Modern English Drama (1924); English plays, 1660-1820 (1935)
- Military career
- Allegiance: United Kingdom
- Branch: British Army
- Rank: Captain
- Commands: Artillery Cadet School, Royal Field Artillery
- Conflicts: World War I

Arthur Eustace Morgan FRSC (26 July 1886 – 3 February 1972) was an English literature professor and academic administrator, known for being the first principal of University College, Hull and the eighth Principal and Vice-Chancellor of McGill University.

== Early life and education ==
Morgan was born in 1886 in Bristol, England. His mother was Elizabeth Reid (née Livingstone-Learmonth) and his father was John Charles Morgan, who worked for the British consular service. From 1903 to 1906, he studied science and medicine at University College, Bristol (now the University of Bristol), before transferring, in 1906, to Trinity College, Dublin to read English and French. He earned his BA from Trinity College in 1909, followed by an upgrade to MA conferred in 1912.

== Military service ==
During World War I, Morgan was deemed medically unfit for active service. He served as captain and gunnery instructor at the Artillery Cadet School in the Royal Field Artillery and was based in Topsham, Devon.

== Academic career ==
Morgan's first academic post was as an assistant lecturer in English and French at University of Bristol in 1909-10. In 1910, he started working as lecturer of English Literature at Royal Albert Memorial College (later University College of the South West of England and since 1955, University of Exeter). He was promoted to professor in 1919, followed by Head of the English Department.

During his time at Exeter, Morgan became involved in the Committee for the Furtherance of University Education in the South West, whose secretary was his colleague William Henry Lewis. The group's mission was to establish a university in the region, which at the time was served by the sole University of Bristol. As part of this work, Morgan lobbied for support from influential public figures in the southwest, namely the MP for Plymouth Sutton Nancy Astor and writer Thomas Hardy, a native of Dorset. He personally visited the latter at his home and succeeded in getting Hardy's endorsement for the committee's mission. From 1920 to 1923, Morgan was deputy to Hector Hetherington, principal of the Royal Albert Memorial College and was credited for contributing to the efforts to get the college elevated to university status, becoming University College of the South West of England (often shortened to University College, Exeter) in 1922.

Morgan went on to lecture at University of Sheffield from 1924 to 1926, before being appointed as the first Principal of University College Hull in 1926, remaining in situ until 1935. He had been put forward for this position by Hetherington, who had been impressed by Morgan's work at Exeter as his deputy. During his tenure at Hull, Morgan invited poet T. S. Eliot to give a guest lecture at his college, which took place in November 1934.

Morgan was appointed as Principal and Vice-Chancellor of McGill University in 1935. As reported by Time Magazine in their article announcing his arrival in Canada, Morgan himself had anticipated challenges in the new post, "Canadians dislike to see an Englishman getting Canada’s biggest educational plum". Indeed, the new vice-chancellor was said to be unpopular among the university staff and he especially clashed with the board and chancellor, Edward Wentworth Beatty. The left-leaning principal "celebrated the presence of the socialist professors" who had openly criticised capitalism and who had been the subject of complaints from the right-leaning chancellor and his board. On the contrary, student leaders at McGill spoke positively of Morgan's liberal values and his firm stance on "freedom of thought and speech".

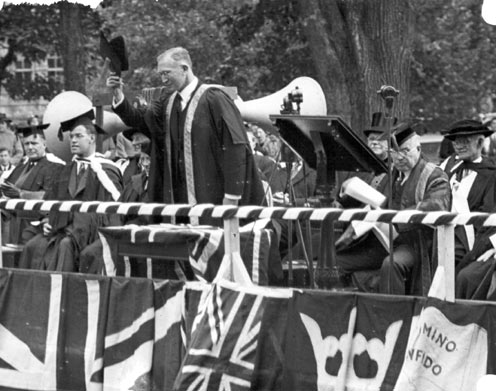
Morgan saluting the crowd attending his installation ceremony at McGill University on 5 October 1935.

Eventually, Morgan resigned from his post in 1937. His resignation letter read as follows:

Montreal, 17th April, 1937.

Dear Sir Edward:

For some time it has been apparent that you and the other members of the Board of Governors did not see eye to eye with me in regard to the relation of the Principalship to the Governors.

We have had several talks on the subject during the past year and it now seems clear to me that it would be in the best interests of the University for me to ask you to convey to the Board my request to be relieved of my office from the 31st May next. I gather from you that this course would be acceptable to the Board.

Yours sincerely,

(Signed) A. E. Morgan

=== Scholarly works ===
As a scholar of English literature, Morgan lectured and wrote primarily about poetry and drama. He was the author of Scott and His Poetry, an anthology and biography of Sir Walter Scott, first published in 1912. With R. P. Cowl, he co-edited Henry IV, Part 1 in the Arden Shakespeare series, first published in 1914. He and Sherard Vines also co-edited Antony and Cleopatra and Love's Labour's Lost in Blackie and Son's Warwick Shakespeare series (published in 1934 and 1936, respectively). His other writings on English-speaking drama include Tendencies of Modern English Drama (1924) and English Plays 1660-1820 (1935). Morgan's interests in drama extended beyond academia. He was actively involved in the British Drama League during his time in Exeter. He also served, for sometime, as chair of Sheffield Repertory Theatre and as board member of Hull Little Theatre Company.

Morgan was one of the British delegates at the Conference of British and American Professors of English at Columbia University in 1923. Following the conference, he also taught at Columbia Summer Session. In the summer of 1924, he was a visiting Professor at University of Iowa and also gave a public lecture on poetry at the University of Minnesota.

== Civil and public service ==
Returning to England in 1937, Morgan worked for the Ministry of Labour and National Service in various posts, including being in charge of the ministry's Juvenile Branch during World War II. During his time at the Ministry of Labour, Morgan worked on research into young people's welfare and education, becoming a well-known authority in this field. Notably, he was commissioned by King George's Jubilee Trust to write the report entitled The Needs of Youth (1939), in which he concluded: "unless a youth is reared in a decent home and has sufficient clothing and food it cannot be expected that he will fulfil the potentialities of his manhood". Morgan was a co-opted council member of the National Association of Boys' Clubs, where he also chaired the Industrial Advisory Committee.

In 1945, he was appointed as Educational Director of the British Council. From 1954 to 1963 he was warden at Toynbee Hall.

== Honours and recognitions ==
During his time as principal of McGill University, Morgan was elected as a Fellow of the Royal Society of Canada, following nomination from Lawrence Johnstone Burpee in 1936. He was awarded an honorary LLD from McMaster University in 1937.

== Personal life and death ==
In 1909, Morgan married Mabel Eugénie Melhuish, also known as May. They had four daughters; the eldest, Diana (born Mabel Gladys Morgan) was married to the archaeologist Maurice Barley. Barley's autobiography, The Chiefest Grain, includes references to the author's father-in-law.

Morgan died at his home in Bristol on 3 February 1972.

== Selected publications ==
- Morgan, A. E. (1912). Scott & His Poetry. London: George G. Harrap and Co. – via Internet Archive.
- Shakespeare, William (1919) [1914]. Cowl, R. P.; Morgan, A. E. (eds.). The first part of King Henry the Fourth. Arden Shakespeare (2nd ed.). London: Methuen Drama – via Internet Archive.
- Morgan, A. E. (1924). Tendencies of modern English drama. London: Constable & Co. OL 14112062M – via Internet Archive.
- Shakespeare, William (1934). Morgan, A. E.; Vines, W. Sherard (eds.). Antony and Cleopatra. Warwick Shakespeare. London: Blackie and Son.
- Morgan, A. E., ed. (1935). English plays, 1660-1820. New York: Harper & brothers.
- Shakespeare, William (1936). Morgan, A. E.; Vines, W. Sherard (eds.). Love's Labour's Lost. Warwick Shakespeare. London: Blackie and Son.
- Morgan, A. E. (1939). The Needs of Youth. London: Oxford University Press.
- Morgan, A. E. (1943). Young Citizen. Harmondsworth: Penguin Publishing.
- Morgan, A. E. (1948). Youth Services. London: Longmans, Green and Co.
