= Special Commissions (Dardanelles and Mesopotamia) Act 1916 =

Act of the Parliament of the United Kingdom

Special Commissions (Dardanelles and Mesopotamia) Act 1916 (Note: Section 7.)
- Act of Parliament
- Parliament of the United Kingdom
- Long title: An Act to constitute Special Commissions to inquire into the origin, inception, and conduct of Operations of War in the Dardanelles and Gallipoli, and into the origin, inception, and conduct of Operations of War in Mesopotamia.
- Citation: 6 & 7 Geo. 5. c. 34
- Territorial extent: United Kingdom

Dates
- Royal assent: 17 August 1916
- Commencement: 17 August 1916 (Note: The Acts of Parliament (Commencement) Act 1793.)
- Repealed: 22 December 1927
Other legislation
Repealed by	Statute Law Revision Act 1927

Status: Repealed

Text of statute as originally enacted

The Special Commissions (Dardanelles and Mesopotamia) Act 1916 (6 & 7 Geo. 5. c. 34) was an act of the Parliament of the United Kingdom set up to investigate the World War I operations in the Dardanelles Campaign and the Mesopotamian campaign.

The Walcheren Campaign of 1809 and the Crimean War had been investigated by parliamentary committees. The British prime minister, H. H. Asquith, therefore initially proposed a select committee to inquire into the disasters at the Dardanelles (the Gallipoli Bridgeheads were finally evacuated in the winter of 1915-16) and in Mesopotamia (where the British and Indian force at Kut surrendered in April 1916). Instead, he was persuaded to agree to appoint a statutory special commission, because '"a Government may… prefer to… appoint… an outside element... less likely to be influenced by party bias."

The terms of the act required that at least one naval and one military officer from the retired lists serve on each commission.

Historian John Grigg writes that the inquiries were “an enormous waste of busy people’s time”. Maurice Hankey had to spend 174 hours preparing material for the Dardanelles Commission. Grigg argues that just the fact of setting up the inquiries was an unfortunate admission that mismanagement had occurred. Coming after the crisis over the extension of conscription to married men in May 1916, which had come close to bringing down the government, and against the backdrop of the costly Somme Offensive (whose results were obviously disappointing, contrary to unconvincing official claims of Allied victory), and the decline in Asquith’s physical stamina and “grip”, the inquiries contributed to the slow decline of the Asquith coalition ministry’s authority. By the end of the year many politicians – and General Robertson – had come to feel that a change was needed in the management of the war, causing the crisis of November-December 1916 which eventually led to Asquith’s replacement as prime minister by David Lloyd George.

== Mesopotamia 1916-17 ==
The Commission of Inquiry's remit was to inquire into the origins, inception and conduct of operations of war in Mesopotamia, notably the Siege of Kut.

The following were appointed:

- Lord George Hamilton, chairman
- Earl of Donoughmore
- Lord Hugh Cecil
- Archibald Williamson, 1st Baron Forres
- J. Hodge
- J.C. Wedgwood
- Admiral Cyprian Bridge, (retired Naval)
- General Rt. Hon. Sir Neville Gerald Lyttelton

The Commission summoned over 100 witnesses. It was highly critical of many individuals and the administrative arrangements. William Babtie, responsible for medical provision on the Mesopotamia front, was heavily criticised.

== Dardanelles 1916-19 ==
See Dardanelles Commission

The following were appointed:

- Evelyn Baring, 1st Earl of Cromer (initial chairman, died 29 Jan 1917)
- William Pickford, 1st Baron Sterndale, Chairman
- Andrew Fisher
- Thomas Mackenzie
- Frederick Cawley, 1st Baron Cawley
- James Avon Clyde, Lord Clyde
- Stephen Gwynn
- Walter Francis Roch
- Admiral Sir William Henry May
- William Nicholson, 1st Baron Nicholson

== Subsequent developments ==
The whole act was repealed by section 1 of, and part I of the schedule to, the Statute Law Revision Act 1927 (17 & 18 Geo. 5. c. 42), which came into force on 22 December 1927.

== Bibliography ==
- 'Appendix 1', Office-Holders in Modern Britain: Volume 10: Officials of Royal Commissions of Inquiry 1870-1939 (1995), pp. 85–8. URL: http://www.british-history.ac.uk/report.asp?compid=16611. Date accessed: 12 August 2007.
- Grigg, John (2002) [1985]. Lloyd George: From Peace To War 1912-16. Penguin. ISBN 0-140-28426-5.
