= Mary Pickford (politician) =

British politician (1884-1934)

The Honourable Mary Pickford CBE
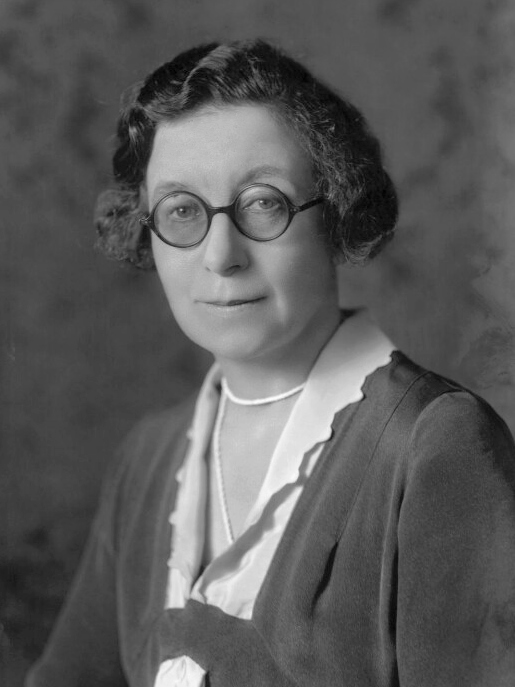

Member of Parliament for Hammersmith North
- In office 27 October 1931 – 6 March 1934
- Prime Minister: Ramsay MacDonald
- Preceded by: James Gardner
- Succeeded by: Fielding Reginald West

Personal details
- Born: Mary Ada Pickford; 5 July 1884
- Died: 6 March 1934 (aged 49) King Sterndale, Derbyshire
- Party: Conservative
- Parents: William Pickford (father); Alice Brooke (mother)
- Education: Wycombe Abbey School
- Alma mater: Lady Margaret Hall, Oxford

Mary Ada Pickford, CBE (5 July 1884 – 6 March 1934) was an English politician, industrialist and historian. After working to support the Conservative Party over several years, she was elected as a Member of Parliament in 1931, and specialised in Indian issues; she also used her knowledge of the factory system gained while working as an inspector during the First World War to speak about employment issues. Pickford supported her constituency through the depression of the 1930s but died suddenly of pneumonia at the age of 49.

== Family ==
Pickford was the daughter of William Pickford who was then a leading barrister on the Northern circuit. William Pickford went on to rise through the profession of law, becoming a Queen's Counsel in 1893, a Recorder from 1901 and a Judge of the High Court of Justice in 1907. In 1914 he became a Lord Justice of Appeal and President of the Probate, Divorce and Admiralty Division from 1918. William Pickford received a peerage as Baron Sterndale in November 1918 (from which Mary Pickford received the title 'the Honourable') and he served as Master of the Rolls from 1919 until his death in 1923. Her mother Alice (née Brooke), died only two months after her birth.

== Education and war service ==
Mary Pickford attended Wycombe Abbey School, under Miss Frances Dove. In the summer of 1904 at the age of 19 she was presented at Court as a débutante, and she also escorted her father at social events for the judiciary. She went up to Lady Margaret Hall at the University of Oxford, but her education was interrupted by war service. She worked as an unpaid inspector for the factory department of the Home Office, and from 1917 to 1921 she worked as an assistant on the compilation of the Official History of the War, as a member of the Historical Section of the Committee of Imperial Defence. In 1921 she graduated, both BA and MA, from Oxford.

== Career ==
Early in 1926, Pickford was appointed as a member of the Committee on Education and Industry set up by the Government. She was an advisor to the British Government delegation at the tenth session of the International Labour Conference at Geneva in 1927, and at the 1929 general election she was adopted as Conservative Party candidate in Farnworth. The Times regarded her as a candidate "of outstanding personality". She ran a vigorous campaign against a Labour majority of under 3,000, but Labour succeeded in winning the seat with an increased majority of 11,214. Shortly after the election it was announced that Pickford had been appointed a Commander of the Order of the British Empire in the King's birthday honours list "for public services".

In July 1929 Pickford was named to a Conservative Party committee which was considering the replies from the constituencies to a questionnaire asking the reasons for the party's defeat. She spoke on "Social Legislation" in a Conservative Party lecture at the Ladies' Carlton Club in the spring of 1930, and followed that the next year by talking about the Alternative Vote and Proportional Representation. She was appointed by the executive committee of the National Union of Conservative and Unionist Associations to represent them on the Board of Governors of Bonar Law Memorial College.

== Parliament ==
At the 1931 general election, Pickford was adopted as Conservative candidate for Hammersmith North, where Labour had a majority of 3,857 at the previous election in 1929. She supported Stanley Baldwin's policy of tariffs, and declared that the Government would have been able to avoid any cuts in unemployment benefit had they cut down on abuses 18 months before. In the circumstances of the election, she received support from local members of the Liberal Party with speakers and canvassers, and Conservatives from Kensington South (which was unopposed) came over to help. She won election with a majority of 6,977 over the incumbent Labour MP; candidates from the Communist Party and the New Party lost their deposits. Pickford made her maiden speech on 23 November, referring to her experience as a factory inspector in arguing that employing women and young persons for long hours resulted in lower output, and that a day of eight or nine hours produced more than one of twelve hours. She called for the National Government to bring up to date the factory and workshop legislation.

=== India ===
Early in 1932, she was named as a member of the Franchise Committee which was to assist the Round Table Conference on India by making recommendations on the conditions in which Indians could obtain the right to vote. In connection with her duties, she travelled to India in the spring of 1932, returning at the end of May to a dinner in her honour by the women MPs. Pickford defended the finding of her Committee which would increase the electorate for the provincial councils to 36,000,000 against accusations from Winston Churchill (among others) that it would be unmanageably large; she stated that they would not all hold elections at the same time, and the federal council would have a much smaller electorate of 8,400,000.

After the conclusion of the Franchise Committee and the Round Table, Pickford spoke in a House of Commons debate saying that legitimate Indian aspirations should be satisfied and that the Indian National Congress would resume its civil disobedience if they were not. In April 1933 Pickford was one of 16 MPs named to a Joint Select Committee of the House of Commons and House of Lords on the future constitution of India.

=== Social issues ===
Pickford also became Chairman of Whitelands Training College, which trained women teachers. She called on the Government to introduce legislation to restrict the working hours of young people, saying that the situation where a boy or girl of 14 could work for 74 hours a week should not be allowed to continue; however she also led a delegation of 21 women's organisations to the Parliamentary Under-Secretary at the Home Office in June 1933, calling for women working in supervision and management to be exempted from a general ban on the night employment of women.

In December 1932 Pickford spoke in a Liberal Party debate on housing in London, commenting that in her constituency some working-class people paid more than half their income in rent. She called for a national programme to supply housing to be let at low rents. She was a member of a Save the Children Fund inquiry into the effects of unemployment on children.

== Death ==
Pickford was taken suddenly ill in March 1934, and three days later died of pneumonia at the family home in King Sterndale, Derbyshire. Tributes were paid by senior politicians, with the Chairman of the Joint Select Committee Lord Lothian referring to her as "one .. whose charm and good comradeship will indeed be sadly missed by each one of her colleagues". Sir Samuel Hoare remarked on her "mind ready for action, a sympathy and a sanity that never failed, and a vigorous and human personality that always impressed itself on friends and colleagues."

Parliament of the United Kingdom
Preceded by James Gardner	Member of Parliament for Hammersmith North; 1931 – 1934	Succeeded by Fielding Reginald West
