= William Pickford, 1st Baron Sterndale =

British lawyer & judge (1848–1923)

The Right Honourable The Lord Sterndale PC

Master of the Rolls
- In office 31 October 1919 – 17 August 1923
- Preceded by: Sir Charles Swinfen Eady
- Succeeded by: The Lord Hanworth

President of the Probate, Divorce and Admiralty Division
- In office 17 October 1918 – 31 October 1919
- Preceded by: Sir Samuel Evans
- Succeeded by: The Lord Merrivale

Personal details
- Born: William Pickford; 1 October 1848 Manchester, England
- Died: 17 August 1923 (aged 74) King Sterndale, Derbyshire, England
- Spouse: Alice Mary Brooke (m. 1880; died 1884)
- Children: 2, including Mary
- Education: Liverpool College
- Alma mater: Exeter College, Oxford
- Profession: Barrister; judge

William Pickford, 1st Baron Sterndale, PC (1 October 1848 – 17 August 1923) was a British lawyer and judge. He served as a Lord Justice of Appeal between 1914 and 1918, as President of the Probate, Divorce and Admiralty Division between 1918 and 1919 and as Master of the Rolls between 1919 and 1923.

== Biography ==
Pickford was born in Manchester, son of the Manchester merchant Thomas Edward Pickford and his wife, Georgina, daughter of Jeremiah Todd-Naylor, and grandson of Thomas Pickford II of the Pickfords carriers. He was educated at Liverpool College and went to Exeter College, Oxford in 1867. He entered the Inner Temple in 1871, reading under Thomas Henry Baylis, and was called to the bar in 1874. Going the Northern Circuit, he had chambers in Liverpool.

As a junior Pickford appeared in the trial of Florence Maybrick. He took silk in 1893. He was made Recorder of Oldham in 1901, and then of Liverpool in 1904. He also represented the British government in 1905, in the inquiry after the Dogger Bank incident when Russia sunk some Hull trawlers.

Pickford was appointed a judge of the High Court in 1907 and a Lord Justice of Appeal and sworn of the Privy Council in 1914. In 1916 he was chairman of the Dardanelles Commission. He was made President of the Probate, Divorce and Admiralty Division and raised to the peerage as Baron Sterndale, of King Sterndale in the County of Derby, in 1918. The following year he became Master of the Rolls, a post he held until his death.

== Family ==
Lord Sterndale married Alice Mary Brooke, of Sibton Park Suffolk, on 18 August 1880. They had two daughters, Dorothy Frances Pickford (b. 1881) and Mary (Molly) Ada Pickford (b. 1884). His wife Alice died after childbirth on 5 September 1884. Sterndale's daughter the Hon. Mary Ada Pickford sat as Conservative Member of Parliament for Hammersmith North from 1931 to 1934. Lord Sterndale died in August 1923, aged 74, when the barony became extinct. He is buried at King Sterndale Church near Buxton, Derbyshire.

== Arms ==
Coat of arms of William Pickford, 1st Baron Sterndale
Crest A Demi Lion Azure holding a Wheel Or Escutcheon Chequy Erminois and Azure on a Fess engrailed Argent a Wheel Gules between two Horses' Heads erased proper Supporters On either side a Lion Azure charged on the shoulder with a Wheel Or Motto Celeriter (Quickly)

Legal offices
Preceded by Sir Samuel Evans	President of the Probate, Divorce and Admiralty Division; 1918–1919	Succeeded by Sir Henry Duke
Preceded by Sir Charles Swinfen Eady	Master of the Rolls; 1919–1923	Succeeded by Sir Ernest Pollock
Peerage of the United Kingdom
New creation	Baron Sterndale; 1918–1923	Extinct
