= Listed buildings in King Sterndale =

King Sterndale is a civil parish in the High Peak district of Derbyshire, England. The parish contains five listed buildings that are recorded in the National Heritage List for England. All the listed buildings are designated at Grade II, the lowest of the three grades, which is applied to "buildings of national importance and special interest". The parish contains the village of King Sterndale and the surrounding area. The listed buildings consist of houses and farmhouses, a church, and a market cross.

== Buildings ==
Name and location–49	Photograph	Date	Notes
Village cross 53.24704°N 1.85739°W		Medieval	The market cross on the village green is in gritstone, and consists of the stump of an octagonal cross shaft. This is set in a square base on three steps, and on the base is an inscription.
Cowdale Hall; 53.24457°N 1.87952°W	—	1637	A farmhouse in limestone with gritstone dressings, quoins, and a roof with coped gables. There are two storeys, and a T-shaped plan, with a front range of three bays and a cross-wing to the west. Most of the windows have been replaced, and there is a re-set dated and initialled stone.
Green Farmhouse; 53.24684°N 1.85863°W		Mid 18th century	The farmhouse is in limestone with gritstone dressings, quoins, and a concrete slate roof. There are two storeys and a T-shaped plan, with three bays and a projecting bay to the southwest. The windows are mullioned with three lights, and contain casements.
House and cottages southwest of Green Farmhouse; 53.24647°N 1.85900°W	—	Late 18th century	The house and cottages are in roughcast limestone and gritstone, and have Welsh slate roofs. The house has floor bands, a moulded eaves cornice, two storeys and two bays, and a rear outshut. It contains a doorway with a fanlight and sash windows. The cottages are lower with two storeys and five bays, and contain mullioned windows.
Christ Church; 53.24235°N 1.86173°W		1847	The church, designed by Ignatius Bonomi in Early English style, is in limestone with gritstone dressings, quoins, and a Welsh slate roof with coped gables. It consists of a nave, a southwest porch, and a lower chancel with a lean-to vestry on the southeast. On the southwest gable is a gabled bellcote, and the windows are lancets with quoined surrounds.
