= Dardanelles Commission =

British investigation (1915–1919)

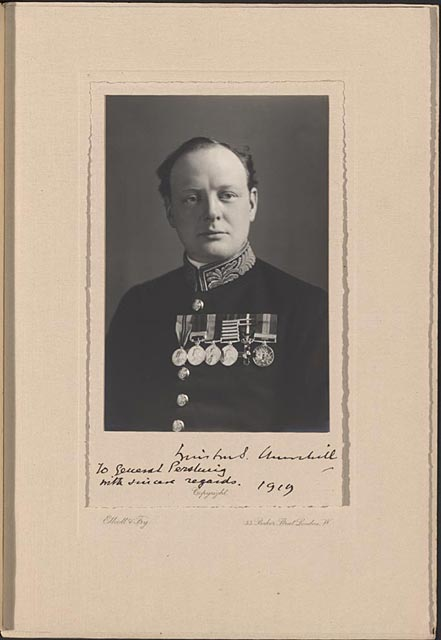
Winston Churchill (pictured in 1919) was largely blamed for British failures during the Dardanelles Campaign.

The Dardanelles Commission was a British investigation into the disastrous 1915 Dardanelles Campaign. It was set up under the Special Commissions (Dardanelles and Mesopotamia) Act 1916. The final report of the commission, issued in 1919, found major problems with the planning and execution of the campaign.

== Investigation and findings ==
Winston Churchill had been largely blamed for the failures of the British forces during the campaign since, as First Lord of the Admiralty, he had been responsible for instigating the plan and obtaining Cabinet approval to carry it out. The resignation of First Sea Lord Admiral Fisher in May 1915, because of escalating disagreements between himself and Churchill, triggered the collapse of Asquith's Liberal government. Asquith formed a new coalition government, with Churchill's removal from the Admiralty a price of Conservative support. Churchill remained in the new Cabinet in the sinecure post of Chancellor of the Duchy of Lancaster, and served on the Dardanelles Committee. When the Dardanelles Committee was dissolved and replaced by the new War Committee, Churchill was not included in the new committee, so he resigned from the government in November 1915. For a time, he took up a position as a battalion commander on the Western Front (while remaining a Member of Parliament). He returned to parliamentary duty in 1916, where he attempted to rehabilitate his reputation, when the battalion was amalgamated with another.

Churchill sought to obtain the release of government papers, which, he felt, would vindicate his own actions. In May Bonar Law had indicated on behalf of the Prime Minister that this might be possible, but by June, Prime Minister H. H. Asquith, had decided that it could not be done. Matters were complicated by the death of Field Marshal Kitchener, who had been Secretary of State for War, on 6 June 1916.

Instead, Asquith agreed to the setting up of a Commission of Enquiry into the affair, which was announced on 18 July 1916. The Earl of Cromer, known to Churchill, was to be the chairman. Churchill anticipated that he would be able to attend meetings of the commission, but they were held in secret. Instead he had to be content with giving evidence himself in September and arranging for other witnesses whom he felt important to be heard by the commission.

Witnesses of those involved in the expedition were interviewed, with its final report issued in 1919. It concluded that the expedition had been poorly planned and executed and that difficulties had been underestimated; problems were exacerbated by supply shortages and by personality clashes and procrastination at high levels.

== Appointees ==
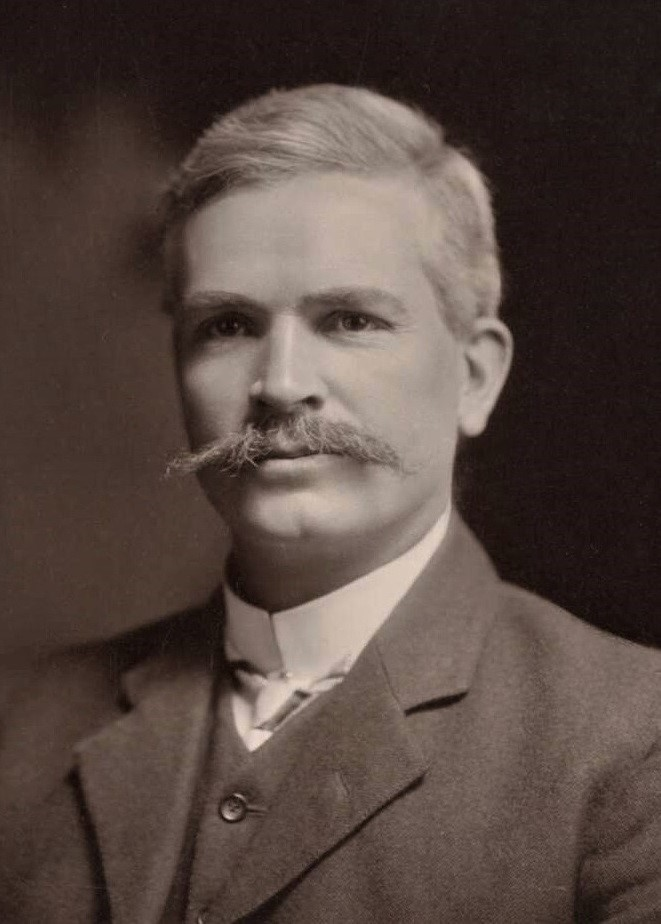
Andrew Fisher was a member of the commission.

The following were appointed:

- Earl of Cromer (initial chairman, died 29 January 1917)
- Sir William Pickford, chairman
- Andrew Fisher, former Prime Minister of Australia
- Thomas Mackenzie, former Prime Minister of New Zealand
- Sir Frederick Cawley, Chancellor of the Duchy of Lancaster
- Lord Clyde, Privy Counsellor
- Stephen Gwynn, MP for Galway
- Walter Roch, MP for Pembrokeshire
- Admiral of the Fleet Sir William May
- Field Marshal The Lord Nicholson

== Bibliography ==
- Jenkins, Roy, Churchill, 2001, ISBN 0-333-78290-9, Macmillan
- Carlyon, Lee, Gallipoli, 2001, Doubleday, ISBN 0-385-60475-0
