= 1934 Hammersmith North by-election =

UK Parliamentary by-election

The 1934 Hammersmith North by-election was held on 24 April 1934. The by-election was held due to the death of the incumbent Conservative MP, Mary Pickford. It was won by the Labour candidate Fielding West.

Hammersmith North: By-election, 24 April 1934
Party	Candidate	Votes	%	±%
Labour	Fielding West	14,263	55.7	+18.5
Conservative	C. P. Davis	10,747	41.9	−17.3
Communist	Ted Bramley	614	2.4	+0.2
Majority		3,516	13.8	N/A
Turnout		45,216	56.7	−12.9
Labour gain from Conservative		Swing		
