= Lionel Hichens =

British industrialist (1874–1940)

- Born: 1 May 1874
- Died: 14 October 1940 (aged 66)
- Education: Winchester College; New College, Oxford,
- Occupation: Industrialist

William Lionel Hichens (1 May 1874–14 October 1940) was a British industrialist, chairman of Cammell Laird from 1910.

== Early life ==
He was the second, posthumously-born son of John Ley Hichens, army surgeon, and his wife, Catherine Bacchus (1843–1924), and was known as Nel Hichens. His father became surgeon to the 1st Staffordshire Regiment of Foot in 1858; he was later a physician in St Ives, Cornwall. His mother was a daughter of William Bacchus of Edgbaston.

Hichens was educated at Winchester College, and studied at New College, Oxford, in France and in Germany. He was briefly a teacher at Sherborne School. He joined the City Imperial Volunteers during the Black Week of the early Second Boer War, and served as a dispatch rider. With Lionel Curtis, Hichens was under Sam Hughes in Henry Settle's column. Lord Cromer in 1900 gave him an administrative position in British Egypt.

Shortly, Hichens was brought back to South Africa, co-opted into Milner's Kindergarten. He was treasurer of Johannesburg in 1901–2, and of the Transvaal from 1902 to 1907. He went on a royal commission to India headed by Charles Hobhouse in 1907, and on a board of enquiry to Southern Rhodesia in 1909. He also contributed to the founding of the Round Table movement.

== In business ==
In 1910 Hichens became chairman of the engineering firm Cammell Laird, despite a lack of business experience. It is assumed that the influence of William Palmer, 2nd Earl of Selborne, a mentor, was involved in the appointment. During World War I he was heavily involved with the Ministry of Munitions, in partnership with Robert Brand setting up the Imperial Munitions Board. They went to Canada in autumn 1915, and resolved the administrative supply difficulties, to the satisfaction of Robert Borden and Sam Hughes, by appointing Joseph Flavelle to head the new board, replacing the existing Shell Committee. Hichens chaired from 1916 the Central Council of Associations of Controlled Firms for armament suppliers.

After the war, Hichens continued as chairman at Cammell Laird, and served on a number of public bodies. He was brought in as chairman at English Electric in 1927, which under the management of John Pybus had seen serious mistakes made: Pybus suffered a breakdown that year. Cammell Laird had common ground with English Electric, which had taken over Coventry Ordnance Works from it in 1918, and a financial stake through loans made. At this time John Brown & Company held a controlling interest. Hichens stayed as chairman until 1930, when restructuring had occurred and Holberry Mensforth had been brought in, who recruited George Nelson. In 1928 the English Steel Corporation was formed, in which Cammell Laird and Vickers pooled their steel interests. The amalgamation involved Hichens in the closure of steel plants at Grimsthorpe and Penistone.

In 1929, Hichens settled at North Aston Hall in Oxfordshire, which he bought in 1929. Hichens died in a bombing raid during The Blitz on 14 October 1940 aged 66, as a bomb hit Church House, Westminster, and was buried at North Aston church.

== Views ==
Hichens was considered a progressive employer, with views on working hours, minimum wage and job security comparable to those of Lord Leverhulme and Seebohm Rowntree. He gave two Rowntree Lectures during the 1920s. In the wartime context of the Ministry of Munitions he had suggested a type of joint industrial council, about which George Ranken Askwith had reservations. He gave a paper in 1919 to the Society for Arts on "The Wage Problem in Industry", which caused Askwith to express astonishment.

In 1919 Hichens spoke at the United Summer School in Swanwick, Derbyshire, and published the talk as The New Spirit in Industrial Relations, an early use of "industrial relations" as a term. The Summer School was an inter-denominational conference for those attending adult schools. He was an activist for the Industrial Christian Fellowship (ICF), formed in 1920 when the Christian Social Union (UK) (CSU) merged with the Navvy Mission Society. David Carnegie, whom Hichens had encountered on the Shell Committee and Imperial Munitions Board, was a CSU supporter and Liberal Party candidate who adopted his line on industrial relations in the ICF.

A proponent of adult education, Hichens chaired the board of governors of Birkbeck College from 1927.

== Family ==
In 1919 Hichens married Mary Hermione Lyttelton, daughter of General Neville Lyttelton and sister of Lucy Masterman and Hilda Margaret Grenfell. They had three sons, including the cricketer Andrew Hichens, and three daughters. Their daughter Stella (born 1927), an opera singer, married in 1951 Richard Phipps Hornby.
