= Henry Foreman =

British politician (1852–1924)

Sir Henry Foreman OBE (7 June 1852 – 11 April 1924) was a British Conservative politician. He was the mayor of Hammersmith and he married twice. His second wife and mayoress, Lucy Beatrice (née Randall), was the first President of Hammersmith Ladies Swimming Club.

== Biography ==
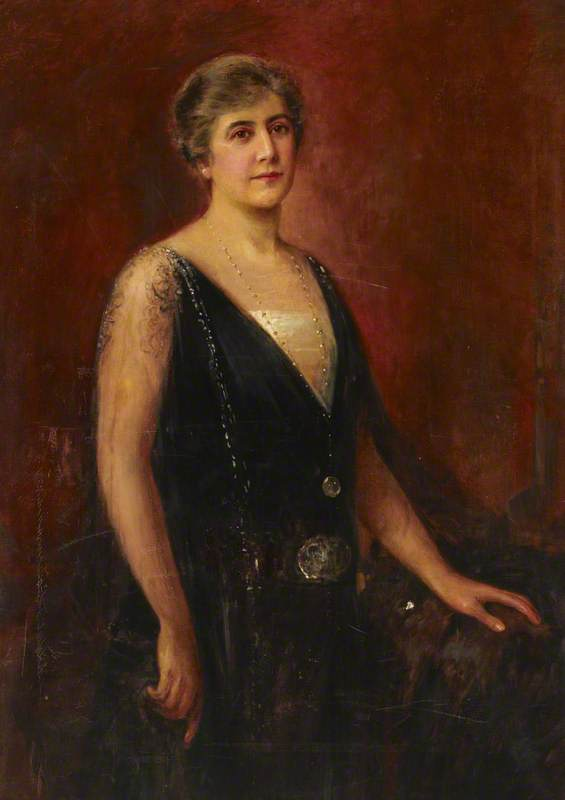
Lady Foreman, Wife of Sir Henry Foreman (Mayor) (unknown artist)

Foreman was the son of Edwin George Foreman and Amelia Cox of Campden Hill, Kensington, London. He married first in 1893 and he became deeply involved in the municipal politics of Hammersmith. From 1913 to 1920 he was mayor of the Metropolitan Borough of Hammersmith, and was an alderman on the borough council from 1918. Foreman married firstly in 1873 Marion, (died 1893), daughter of William Howe, of Kensington. He married his second wife, Lucy Beatrice Randall, daughter of A. J. Randall, in 1901. She became his mayoress and was the founding President of the Hammersmith Ladies Swimming Club in 1916.

During the First World War Foreman was actively involved in recruiting for the British Army. As mayor of Hammersmith he was the honorary colonel and founder of the 20th London Cadet Corps and helped raise the 140th Heavy Battery Royal Garrison Artillery and the 40th Divisional Ammunition Column. He also presented the Parkside Orthopaedic Hospital for Officers at Ravenscourt Park to the War Office. He was awarded the Order of the British Empire for his wartime services.

At the 1918 general election he stood as the Coalition Conservative candidate contesting the newly created constituency of Hammersmith North. Foreman faced Liberal and National Party opponents. He was comfortably elected to become Member of Parliament for Hammersmith North, with a majority of 3,243 votes. He was knighted in 1921, for "municipal and local services". He was re-elected as a Conservative at the following election in 1922 with a majority of 2,903 votes over his Labour Party opponent, J P Gardner. A further general election was held in the following year on the issue of tariff reform, and Foreman took the opportunity to retire from politics.

He died on 11 April 1924, aged 71, and was buried at Margravine Cemetery.

Parliament of the United Kingdom
| New constituency | Member of Parliament for Hammersmith North; 1918 – 1923 | Succeeded by James Patrick Gardner |
