= Edmond Elles =

British Army officer (1848–1934)

Lieutenant-General Sir Edmond Elles GCIE KCB DL
- Elles in 1918
- Born: Edmond Roche Elles; 9 June 1848; Oporto, Portugal
- Died: 6 January 1934 (aged 85)
- Military career
- Branch: British Army
- Service years: 1867–1908
- Rank: Lieutenant-General
- Awards: Knight Grand Commander of the Order of the Indian Empire; Knight Commander of the Order of the Bath; Knight Commander of the Order of the Indian Empire

Lieutenant-General Sir Edmond Roche Elles GCIE KCB DL (9 June 1848 – 6 January 1934) was a British Army officer who served in Egypt and India during the late 19th century and early 20th century.

== Military career ==
Elles entered the Royal Artillery in 1867 and was promoted to colonel in 1891. He was Assistant Quartermaster-General at Headquarters in India (intelligence branch) when he was in November 1893 appointed Deputy Quartermaster-General Bengal. In 1900 he was promoted major-general. He served in Egypt and India, including the Indian Frontier, and was appointed a district commander in Peshawar on 18 October 1895. Following the outbreak of the Second Boer War in late 1899, Sir William Nicholson (then Adjutant-General in India) was posted to South Africa, and Elles was appointed acting Adjutant-General on 4 January 1900. In December 1900 he was appointed to command a First class district in India (possibly Secunderabad district), but was replaced four months later, in April 1901, after he had been appointed an Ordinary Member of the Council of the Governor-General of India in March 1901. In January 1903, he was made a Knights Commander of India (KCIE). He was promoted Lieutenant-general February 1907, and retired from the army in 1908.

In 1908, he was appointed a deputy lieutenant of Surrey.

== Family ==
His daughter was Patricia Wentworth, a crime writer.

Military offices
Preceded by Sir William Nicholson	Adjutant-General, India (acting); 1900–1901	Succeeded by Beauchamp Duff
