= North Aston =

Village in Oxfordshire, England

Coordinates: 51.956°N 1.309°W

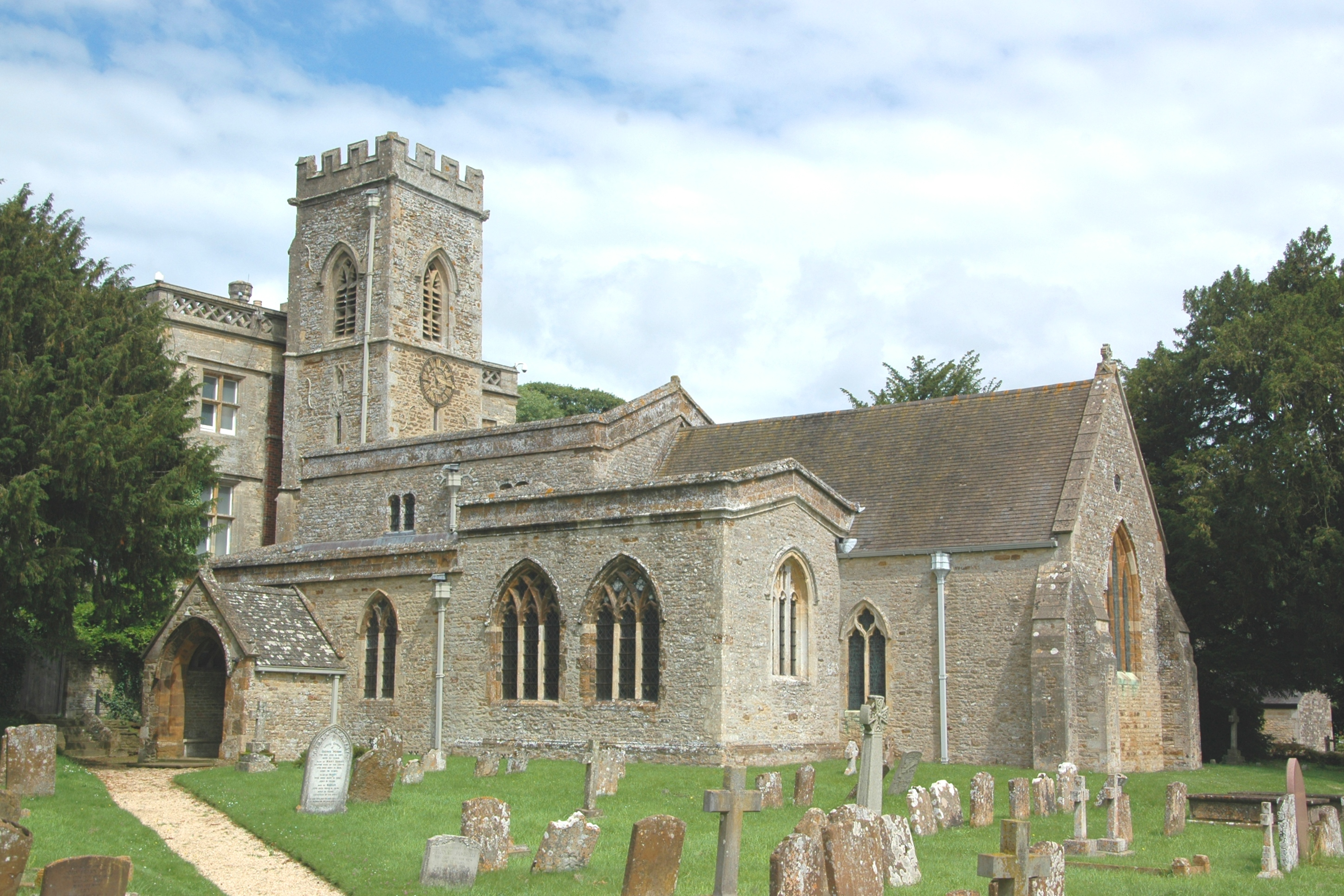
- St Mary the Virgin parish church

- Location within Oxfordshire
- Area: 8.83 km^{2} (3.41 sq mi)
- OS grid reference: SP4728
- Civil parish: North Aston
- District: Cherwell
- Shire county: Oxfordshire
- Region: South East
- Country: England
- Sovereign state: United Kingdom
- Post town: Bicester
- Postcode district: OX25
- Dialling code: 01869
- Police: Thames Valley
- Fire: Oxfordshire
- Ambulance: South Central
- UK Parliament: Banbury

North Aston is a village and civil parish about 7 1/2 miles (12 km) south of Banbury and 10 miles (16 km) north of Oxford. The 2001 Census recorded its population as 212. The 2011 Census did not publish its population separately, but gave a combined total of 316 for the parishes of North Aston and Middle Aston. The village is on a ridge about 460 feet (140 m) above sea level. The parish measures almost 2 miles (3 km) wide east – west and about 1 1/2 miles (2.4 km) north – south. It is bounded to the east by the River Cherwell, and to the north by a stream that flows east to join the Cherwell. The A4260 road linking Oxford and Banbury forms part of its western boundary. Field boundaries form the southern boundary and the remainder of the western boundary. In 1983 the parish covered an area of 1,288 acres (521 ha).

== Manor ==
=== Overlords ===
The Domesday Book records that in 1086 Edward of Salisbury, High Sheriff of Wiltshire, held the over-lordship of the manor of North Aston, and that through him it became attached to the manor of Amesbury. From Edward, North Aston descended through his son Patrick to his grandson Patrick of Salisbury, 1st Earl of Salisbury (died 1168). The overlordship descended with the Earls of Salisbury to Margaret Longespée, 4th Countess of Salisbury and thence to her daughter and heiress Alice de Lacy, 3rd Countess of Lincoln (died 1348) who was also 5th Countess of Salisbury. Alice was married to Thomas, 2nd Earl of Lancaster but in 1322 he was deposed by a party of barons and executed.

One of the barons, Hugh Despenser the Younger, obtained North Aston, which was now a manor of two and a half knight's fees. However, in 1326 Despenser was executed for treason. It is not clear whether the Crown re granted the manor of North Aston immediately after Despenser's death, but by 1389 William de Montacute, 2nd Earl of Salisbury held it with the manor of Amesbury. By the late 14th century the Earls of March held an estate of one knight's fee at North Aston as part of the barony of Clifford Castle. This is likely to be because Margaret Longespée inherited the barony of Clifford from her grandfather Walter de Clifford (died 1263).

=== Lords of the Manor ===
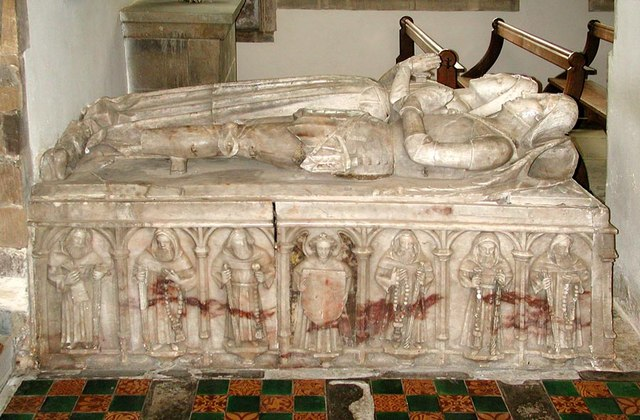
St Mary the Virgin parish church: 15th-century alabaster monument to a knight and his lady; reputedly John and Alicia Anne

In 1086 Edward of Salisbury's tenant at North Aston was Anchetil de Greye. The tenancy had passed to the Trivet family by 1279 and to the Anne family by the middle of the 15th century. In 1554, on the death of a John Anne, North Aston passed to Sir Robert Broke, Lord Chief Justice of the Common Pleas; possibly through the marriage of John Anne's granddaughter to Robert Broke's son. The manor descended via Broke's son John and grandson Sir Basil (died 1646) to Thomas Brooke. Sir Basil Brooke and his son were recusants and Thomas was a Royalist, so in 1653 the Commonwealth authorities sequestrated his estates. The Parliamentarian Major John Wildman, who speculated in confiscated lands, bought North Aston but in 1655 he was jailed. Thomas Brooke seems to have recovered the manor thereafter, as his sister Frances was married there in 1656. Thomas's grandson Basil inherited North Aston in 1687, and it remained in the Brooke family until Basil's widow Winifred died in 1716 leaving North Aston to another recusant: Henrietta Fermor, sister of James Fermor of Tusmore.

Soon afterwards Henrietta seems to have sold the estate to Anthony Rowe, Clerk of the Green Cloth. Rowe's son-in-law Trevor Hill, 1st Viscount Hillsborough inherited North Aston from him but sold it in 1733. The buyer was Charles Oldfield, a Jamaica merchant who on his death in about 1740 gave the estate to his friend Charles Bowles. Three generations of the Bowles family held the estate, the last being Charles Oldfield Bowles who in 1862 sold it to William Foster-Melliar. When Foster-Melliar died in 1906 a Captain John Taylor of Southgate, Middlesex bought North Aston, which included a 990 acres (400 ha) estate. In 1911 Capt. Taylor moved to North Aston Manor and sold North Aston Hall, 200 acres (81 ha) and part of the village to Thomas Pakenham, 5th Earl of Longford. Lionel Hichens, chairman of Cammell Laird, bought North Aston Hall in 1929 and his family still owned it in 1980.

=== Manor House ===
The present North Aston Manor House is an H-shaped 16,970 square feet (1,577 m^{2}) building of which the central part was probably the hall of a 15th-century house or earlier. After the Dissolution of the Monasteries in 1539 the neighbouring and ultimately much larger North Aston Hall became the primary home of the lords of the manor of North Aston, while the manor house became one of the main farm houses of the estate. Occupied by various tenants, the property was called Great House Farm during the 18th and 19th centuries, later Manor House Farm. In the 1930s Captain John Vickris Taylor had a new house built on land that had once formed part of the tract associated with Great House Farm, and called this Manor Farm. In 1976 the Captain's son, Colonel Anthony Taylor, sold the Manor itself to Charles Mackenzie Hill, who subsequently also bought North Aston Hall.

=== North Aston Hall ===
North Aston Hall is a large Jacobethan country house built in the 17th century The ten-bay front was added in the 18th century and the present windows and parapet were added in about 1850.

== Parish church ==
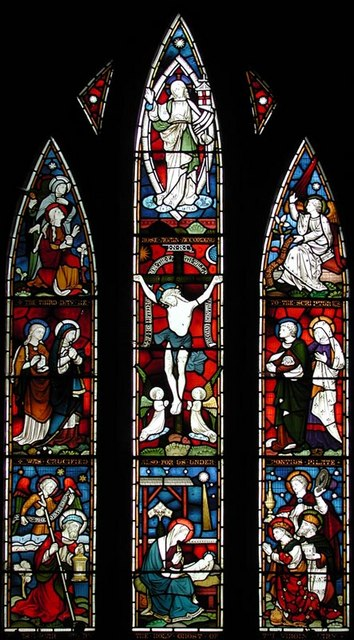
St Mary the Virgin parish church: 19th-century stained glass in the east window of the chancel

The Church of England parish church of Saint Mary the Virgin existed by 1151, when William of Aston gave it to the Augustinian Bradenstoke Priory in Wiltshire. The present building is mostly Decorated Gothic, with early 14th-century windows and north and south arcades. However, the south aisle ends in a chapel that has a 15th-century Perpendicular Gothic east window and the nave has a 15th or 16th-century clerestory. The baptismal font is in an unusual style and it is not known in what era it was carved. Sherwood and Pevsner suggested it might be 14th century; English Heritage says it is probably 17th century but might be earlier.

One of its panels has been carved into a shield but the others are blank and the carving seems incomplete. In 1867 the building was restored and enlarged to designs by George Gilbert Scott, who had the north aisle extended to be as long as the south aisle. The church is a Grade II* listed building. The tower has a ring of six bells. Henry III Bagley, who had bell-foundries at Chacombe and Witney, cast the tenor bell in 1741. John Warner and Sons of London cast the fourth and fifth bells in 1866. John Taylor & Co of Loughborough cast the treble, second and third bells in 1979. Since 1976 St Mary's has been part of a united Church of England Benefice with the neighbouring parishes of Steeple Aston and Tackley.

== Economic and social history ==
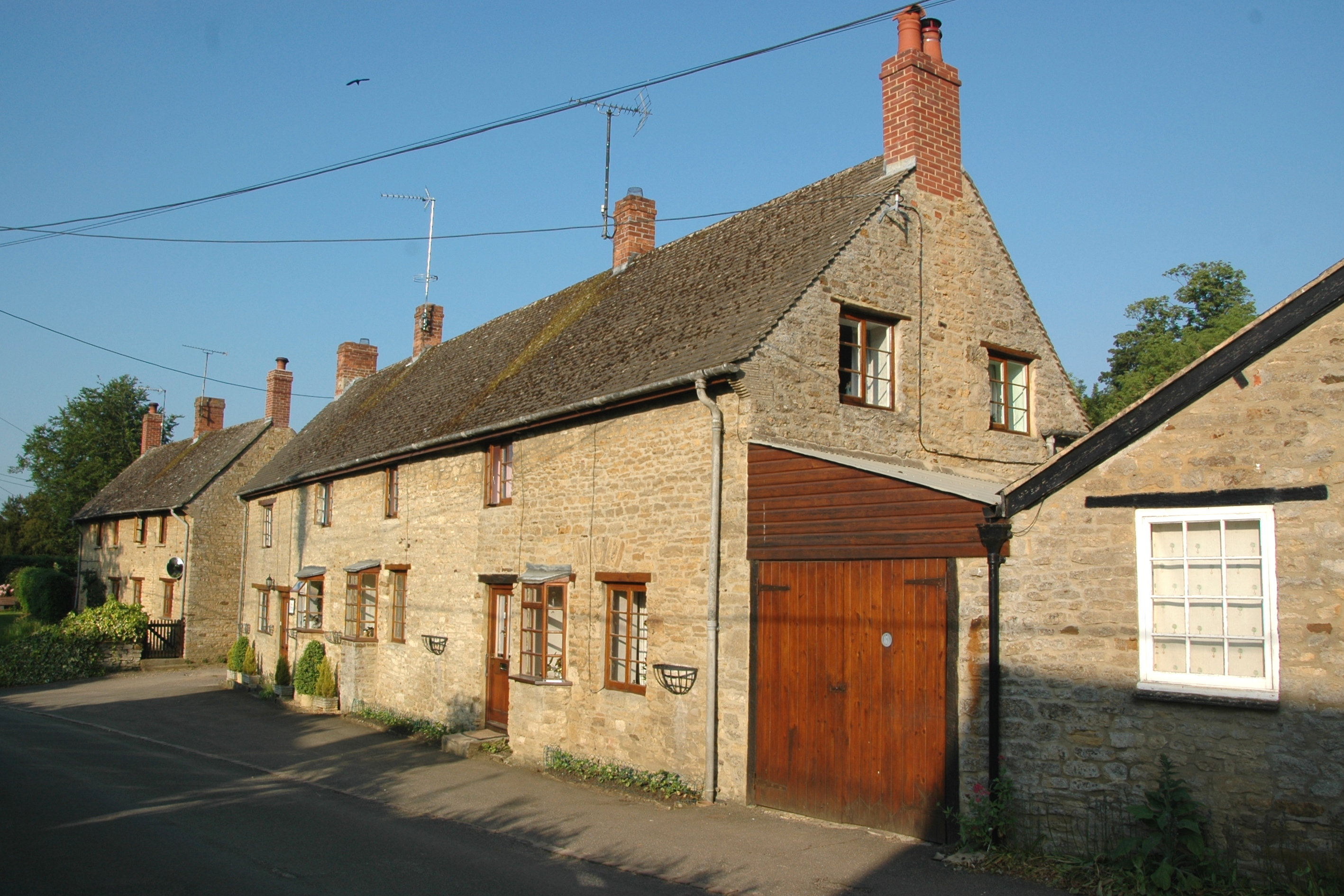
Traditional cottages in Somerton Road

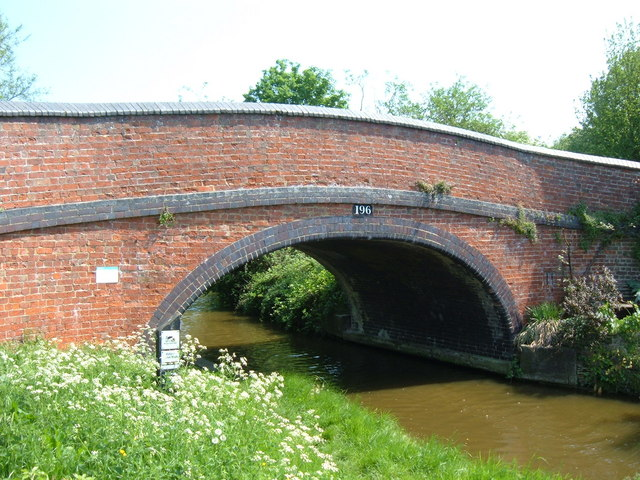
Oxford Canal bridge on the parish boundary between North Aston and Somerton

The Domesday Book records a watermill in the parish, probably on the River Cherwell. The Gambon family were the millers for most of the 13th century, and it continued to be called Gambon's Mill until the 18th century. From the latter part of the 16th century until early in the 18th century it seems to have been a double mill with two millraces and two separate tenants. The last known record of a double mill is from 1733. The Rose family were millers here continuously from 1673 until its commercial closure in 1938, although grain continued to be milled for local use throughout the period of the Second World War, and for a brief time afterwards. The Mill was sold off by the Estate in 1950 and by 1955 had been converted into a private home. Its machinery has been restored and in 1980 remained in situ.

The stretch of the Oxford Canal between Banbury and Tackley was completed in 1787. It runs along the Cherwell valley and for a short distance it forms the eastern boundary of North Aston parish. A village school was built in 1844 and was supervised by the Church of England Diocese of Oxford. In 1872 it moved to new premises when William Foster-Melliar converted the original coach house to the North Aston Hall into a schoolroom with two teachers' cottages attached. In 1923 it was reorganised as a junior school and senior pupils were transferred to the school at Steeple Aston. After the second World War the number of pupils steadily declined, and in 1955 North Aston school was closed. For some twenty years the old schoolroom was a village hall for the community, but in 1976 the building was converted into a private house.

== Current economy and amenities ==
North Aston has a substantial garden centre, Nicholsons Nurseries.

== Climate ==
Climate in this area has mild differences between highs and lows, and there is adequate rainfall year-round. The Köppen Climate Classification subtype for this climate is "Cfb" (Marine West Coast Climate/Oceanic climate).

== Sources ==
- Compton, Hugh J (1976). The Oxford Canal. Newton Abbot: David & Charles. p. 37. ISBN 0-7153-7238-6.
- Crossley, Alan, ed. (1983). "Parishes: North Aston". A History of the County of Oxford. Victoria County History. Vol. 11: Wootton Hundred (northern part). London: Oxford University Press for the Institute of Historical Research. pp. 6–21. ISBN 978-0-19722-758-9.
- Potts, Marcus; Harvey-Lee, John, eds. (2007). North Aston – A Millennium. North Aston: Elizabeth Harvey-Lee. ISBN 978-1-902863-18-4.
- Sherwood, Jennifer; Pevsner, Nikolaus (1974). Oxfordshire. The Buildings of England. Harmondsworth: Penguin Books. pp. 718–719. ISBN 0-14-071045-0.
- Wing, William (1867). The Annals of North Aston. Oxford.
