= Neville Lyttelton =

British army general (1845–1931)

General The Right Honourable Sir Neville Lyttelton GCB GCVO
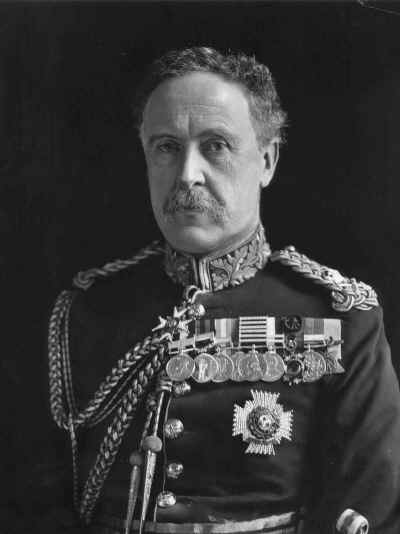
- General Sir Neville Lyttelton
- Born: 28 October 1845; Hagley, Worcestershire
- Died: 6 July 1931 (aged 85); Royal Hospital Chelsea, London
- Spouse: Katharine Sarah Stuart-Wortle
- Children: 3, including Lucy
- Military career
- Allegiance: United Kingdom
- Branch: British Army
- Service years: 1865–1912
- Rank: General
- Commands: Commander-in-Chief, Ireland; Chief of the General Staff; Commander-in-Chief, South Africa; 4th Division; 2nd Division; 4th Brigade; 2nd Brigade; 2nd Battalion Rifle Brigade; 1st Battalion Rifle Brigade
- Conflicts: Fenian Raids; Anglo-Egyptian War; Mahdist War; Second Boer War
- Awards: Knight Grand Cross of the Order of the Bath; Knight Grand Cross of the Royal Victorian Order; Mentioned in Despatches; Order of Osmanieh (Ottoman Empire)

General Sir Neville Gerald Lyttelton, GCB, GCVO, PC (Ire) (28 October 1845 – 6 July 1931) was a British Army officer from the Lyttelton family who served against the Fenian Raids, and in the Anglo-Egyptian War, the Mahdist War and the Second Boer War. He was Chief of the General Staff at the time of the Haldane Reforms and then became Commander-in-Chief, Ireland.

== Military career ==
Born the son of 4th Baron Lyttelton and Mary Lyttelton (née Glynne) and educated at Eton College, Lyttelton was commissioned into the Rifle Brigade in January 1865. As a junior officer he was sent to Canada, where he helped defeat the Fenian raids in 1866 and served as secretary to the Oregon Boundary Commission in 1867. He was promoted to lieutenant on 14 July 1869, to captain on 13 October 1877 and to major on 22 February 1882. In 1880 he was made private secretary to Hugh Childers, Secretary of State for War.

Lyttelton took part in the Anglo-Egyptian War in 1882 as an Aide-de-Camp to Sir John Adye, from 1 August 1882. He saw action at the Battle of Tel el-Kebir and was mentioned in despatches. He was promoted to brevet lieutenant colonel and awarded the Order of Osmanieh (4th Class) on 17 November 1882.

Lyttelton became assistant military secretary to Lieutenant General Sir John Adye in his role as Governor of Gibraltar on 1 January 1883 and military secretary to Lord Reay, Governor of Bombay in 1885. In his young life he made friends, mixing in whiggish aristocratic circles with Edward Grey and Arthur Balfour, later the shapers of imperial foreign policy. He was promoted to brevet colonel on 18 November 1886 and became second-in-command of the 3rd Battalion of his regiment in 1890. Promoted to the substantive rank of lieutenant colonel on 9 November 1892, he became commanding officer of the 1st Battalion of his regiment in 1893 and went on to be commanding officer of the 2nd Battalion of his regiment in Ireland.

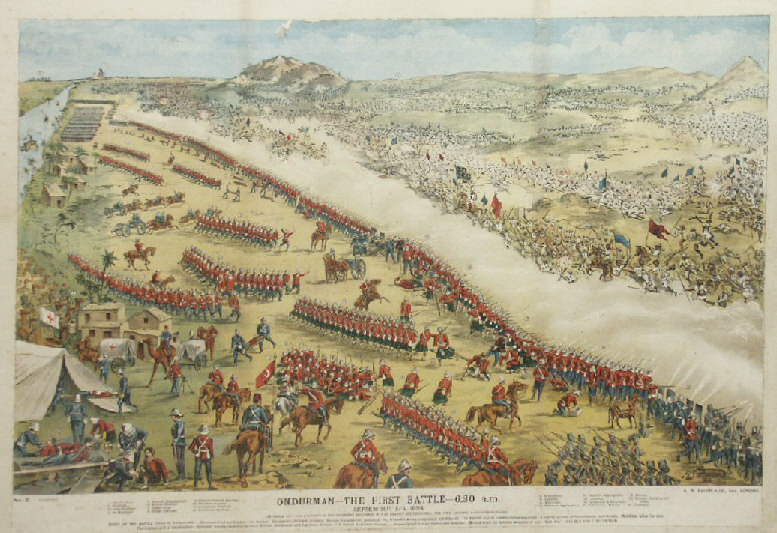
The Battle of Omdurman, at which Lyttelton led the 2nd Brigade, during the Mahdist War

He went on to be assistant adjutant-general at Headquarters in December 1894 and assistant military secretary there in October 1897 and took part in the state funeral of Former prime minister William Gladstone in May 1898.

Lyttelton was given command of 2nd Brigade with the temporary rank of brigadier general on 13 July 1898 and led his brigade at the battle of Omdurman in September 1898 during the Mahdist War.

Lyttelton returned to his role as assistant military secretary at headquarters on 21 October 1898 and then, having become a supernumerary major general for distinguished service in the field on 15 November 1898 and promoted to the substantive rank of major general on 10 February 1899, he briefly took back his old command at 2nd Brigade, now based at Aldershot Command, on 1 September 1899.

Lyttelton served in the Second Boer War as commander of the 4th Brigade in South Africa from 9 October 1899. He temporarily became general officer commanding the 2nd Division in February 1900, then commanded the 4th Division, and was involved in the Battle of Spion Kop in January 1900 and the Battle of Vaal Krantz in February 1900, leading to the Relief of Ladysmith later that month. Promoted to lieutenant general for distinguished service in the field on 22 March 1900, Lord Roberts in his despatch referred to Lyttelton as an officer "with great coolness under fire, and considerable tactical knowledge and resource...an excellent commander in the field." He was in command of the troops in Natal until June 1902, when he became Commander-in-Chief of forces in the Transvaal and Orange River Colony (with Natal as a district in the command) following the end of the Second Boer War the previous month. Early in February 1903 he was also appointed in command of forces in the Cape Colony, thus he had command of the whole of the forces in South Africa. In this role Lyttelton and his wife sought to repair relations with the Boer community. In the South Africa honours list published on 26 June 1902, Lyttelton was knighted as a Knight Commander of the Order of the Bath (KCB).

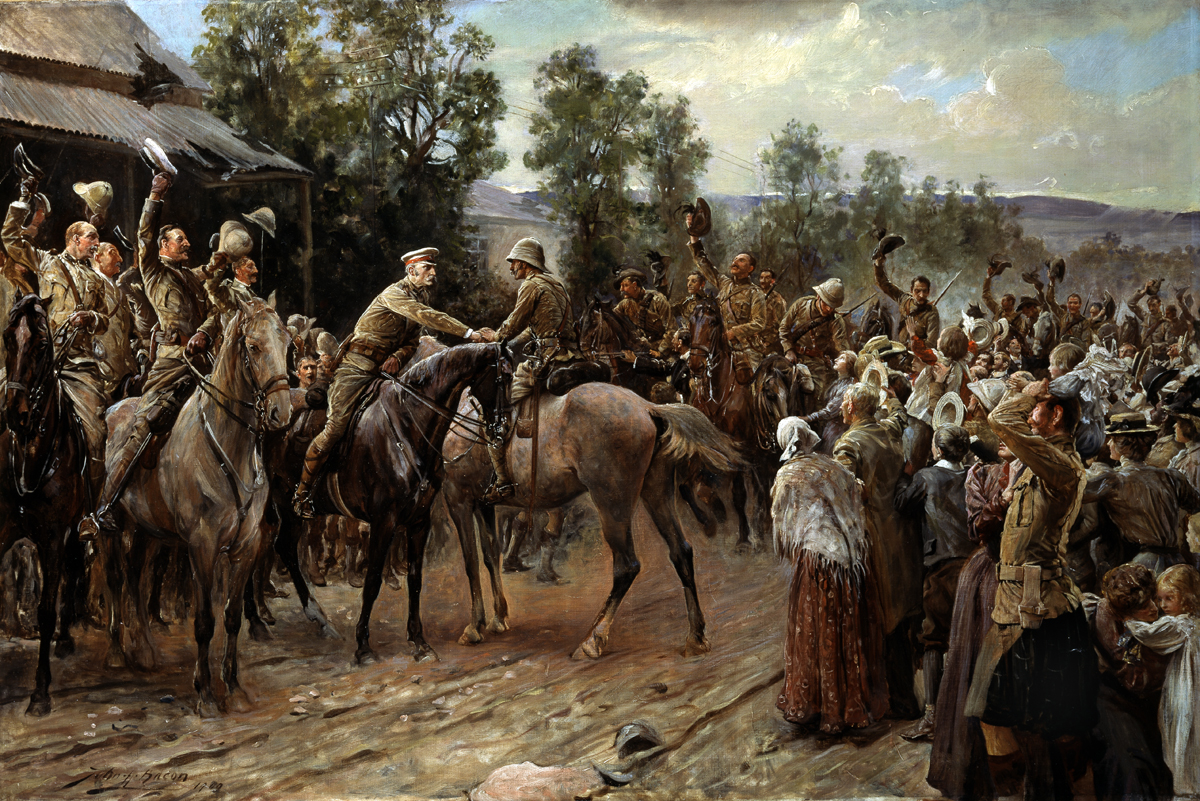
Lyttelton was present at the Siege of Ladysmith

On 12 February 1904 Lyttelton was appointed Chief of the General Staff and a member of the newly formed Army Council. This new post was created following the abolition of the post of Commander-in-Chief of the Forces as recommended by Lord Esher in the Esher Report. Lyttelton was promoted to general on 9 April 1906. This was the time of the Haldane Reforms which sought to implement both a new expeditionary force and a new territorial force, but according to Edward M Spiers, Lyttelton was not up to the task – he was "feckless, malleable, and failed to lead the Army Council".

Lyttelton moved on to become Commander-in-Chief, Ireland on 10 May 1908. He took part both in the funeral procession following the death of King Edward VII in May 1910 and the coronation procession for King George V in June 1911. He was appointed Knight Grand Cross of the Royal Victorian Order on 12 July 1911 and retired on 10 August 1912.

In retirement Lyttelton was a member of the Mesopotamia Commission which sat in 1916/17.

The King insisted on his appointment as Governor of the Royal Hospital Chelsea from 10 August 1912 until his death there on 6 July 1931.

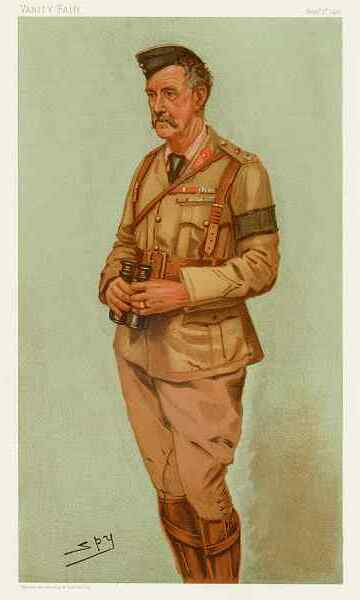
"4th Division". Caricature by Spy published in Vanity Fair in 1901.

== Family ==
In 1883 Lyttelton married Katharine Sarah Stuart-Wortley, the youngest of the nine children of the politician James Stuart-Wortley and Jane Lawley. They had three daughters:

- Lucy Blanche Lyttelton (1884–1977), who married the politician Charles Masterman and had three children, including Margaret
- Hilda Margaret Lyttelton (1886–1972), who married Arthur Morton Grenfell and had four children, including Mary (mother of William Waldegrave), Frances and Laura (the wife of Lord Ballantrae)
- Mary Hermione Lyttelton (1894–), who married the businessman Lionel Hichens and had six children, including Stella (wife of Richard Hornby) and Andrew

Military offices
Preceded by Lord Roberts (as Commander-in-Chief of the Forces)	Chief of the General Staff; 1904–1908	Succeeded by William Nicholson
Preceded by Lord Grenfell	Commander-in-Chief, Ireland; 1908–1912	Succeeded by Sir Arthur Paget
Preceded by Sir John Glyn	Colonel-Commandant of the 4th Battalion, Rifle Brigade (Prince Consort's Own); 1912–1921	Succeeded by Sir Victor Couper
Honorary titles
Preceded by Sir George White	Governor, Royal Hospital Chelsea; 1912–1931	Succeeded by Sir Walter Braithwaite
