= Ellis Ashmead-Bartlett =

English war correspondent (1881–1931)

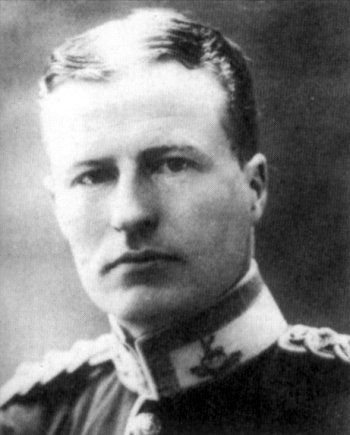
- Ellis Ashmead-Bartlett
- Born: 11 February 1881; London, England
- Died: 4 May 1931 (aged 50); Lisbon, Portugal
- Occupation: War correspondent
- Years active: 1902–1920
- Father: Sir Ellis Ashmead-Bartlett

Ellis Ashmead-Bartlett CBE (11 February 1881 – 4 May 1931) was an English war correspondent during the First World War. Through his reporting of the Battle of Gallipoli, Ashmead-Bartlett was instrumental in the birth of the Anzac legend which still dominates military history in Australia and New Zealand. Through his outspoken criticism of the conduct of the campaign, he was instrumental in bringing about the dismissal of the British commander-in-chief, Sir Ian Hamilton – an event that led to the evacuation of British forces from the Gallipoli peninsula.

== Early years ==
Born on 11 February 1881, Ashmead-Bartlett was the eldest son of Conservative Party MP Sir Ellis Ashmead-Bartlett. He attended Marlborough College and was commissioned in the Grenadier Guards as a second lieutenant on 18 August 1900, seeing active service in South Africa during the Second Boer War. In April 1902, he was called to the bar at Inner Temple. After inheriting his father′s estate, he was on 7 February 1903 commissioned a captain in the local militia battalion of the Bedfordshire Regiment. Two years later, Ashmead-Bartlett arrived in Manchuria to report the Russo-Japanese War. Soon after the war, he published one of the major books on that conflict: Port Arthur: The Siege and Capitulation.

== Dardanelles campaign ==
Ashmead-Bartlett's role as a war correspondent reached maturity during World War I. As correspondent for The Daily Telegraph, Ashmead-Bartlett accompanied Allied forces during the 25 April 1915 landing at Anzac Cove at the start of the Gallipoli campaign. When he went ashore at Anzac Cove at 9.30 p.m. on the evening of the landing he was promptly arrested as a spy for wearing a non-regulation green hat but was released when the boatswain who had brought him ashore testified to who he was.

Ashmead-Bartlett was responsible for the first eyewitness accounts of the battle. His report of the landing was published in Australian newspapers on 8 May, before the reports of the Australian correspondent Charles Bean's. Ashmead-Bartlett's colourful prose, unrestrained by the pursuit of accuracy which hampered Bean's dispatches, was thick with praise for the Anzacs and went down well with Australian and New Zealand audiences:

There has been no finer feat in this war than this sudden landing in the dark and storming the heights, and, above all, holding on while the reinforcements were landing. These raw colonial troops, in these desperate hours, proved worthy to fight side by side with the heroes of Mons, the Aisne, Ypres and Neuve Chapelle.

On 27 May 1915, Ashmead-Bartlett was aboard HMS Majestic, a Royal Navy battleship anchored off W Beach at Cape Helles, when it was torpedoed by the German U-boat U-21. Two days earlier he had seen HMS Triumph go down off Anzac, the first victim of the U-21, and he was well aware that the Majestic would likely suffer the same fate. On the night of 26 May, he helped drink the last of the ship's champagne. He had his mattress brought up on deck so that he would not be trapped in his cabin. Ashmead-Bartlett survived the sinking but lost all his kit. He sailed for Malta to acquire a new wardrobe.

=== Return to London ===
As the battle progressed, Ashmead-Bartlett's reports became highly critical, which left him in disfavour with the British commander-in-chief, General Sir Ian Hamilton. Instead of returning to the Dardanelles from Malta, Ashmead-Bartlett went on to London, arriving on 6 June, to report in person on the conduct of the campaign. During his time in London, he met with most of the senior political figures including Bonar Law (the Colonial Secretary), Winston Churchill (by that time displaced as First Lord of the Admiralty, but still a member of the Cabinet and the Dardanelles Committee), Arthur Balfour (Churchill's replacement at the Admiralty), and H. H. Asquith (the Prime Minister). He was also questioned by Lord Kitchener (the Secretary of State for War).

=== Return to Gallipoli ===
When he returned to Gallipoli, Ashmead-Bartlett established himself on the island of Imbros, which was also the site of Hamilton's headquarters. Here Ashmead-Bartlett lived in relative safety and comfort, and even brought his own cook from Paris. Returning to the peninsula, he witnessed the new landing at Suvla during the August Offensive:

Confusion reigned supreme. No-one seemed to know where the headquarters of the different brigades and divisions were to be found. The troops were hunting for water, the staffs were hunting for their troops, and the Turkish snipers were hunting for their prey.

Ashmead-Bartlett had obtained a movie camera while in London with which he captured the only film footage of the battle. On 21 August, he was watching from Chocolate Hill when the British IX Corps launched the final attack of the campaign, the Battle of Scimitar Hill. While filming, he was buried when an artillery shell landed nearby but was quickly dug free.

=== Criticism ===
When the Australian journalist Keith Murdoch arrived at Gallipoli in September 1915, Ashmead-Bartlett found a receptive audience for his commentary and analysis of the campaign. Murdoch travelled to London carrying a letter from Ashmead-Bartlett – it is disputed whether or not Murdoch knew the contents – which damned the campaign, describing the final offensive as "the most ghastly and costly fiasco in our history since the Battle of Bannockburn". The letter, intended for Asquith, was intercepted in Marseille, and on 28 September, Ashmead-Bartlett was told to leave Gallipoli.

On his return to London, Ashmead-Bartlett gave an "interview" to The Sunday Times (an opinion piece presented as an interview to circumvent censorship rules). Published on 17 October, it was the first detailed account of the campaign and was widely circulated, published in The Times and Daily Mail as well as in Australian papers.

Short of money, Ashmead-Bartlett undertook a lecture tour of England and Australia. He reported on the fighting on the Western Front in France.

== Post-war career ==
Following the war, Ashmead-Bartlett (an opponent of Communism) fought in Hungary against the Bolsheviks, and he spent two years (1924–1926) as a Conservative Member of Parliament for the Hammersmith North constituency in London. Ashmead-Bartlett later became The Daily Telegraph's India correspondent. His coverage was noted for his strong hostility to Mohandas Gandhi's campaign for Indian Independence.

== Death ==
Ashmead-Bartlett died, aged 50, in Lisbon, Portugal of a congestive lung disease while on assignment for The Daily Telegraph on 4 May 1931.

== Select works ==
- Ellis Ashmead-Bartlett (1906). Port Arthur, the Siege and Capitulation. W. Blackwood and sons. "Port Arthur. The Siege and Capitulation." (1906)
- Ellis Ashmead-Bartlett (1910). The Passing of The Shereefian Empire. Edinburgh and London, William Blackwood and sons . 1910
- Ellis Ashmead-Bartlett (1923). The Tragedy of Central Europe. London, Thornton Butterworth Ltd. 1923
- Ellis Ashmead-Bartlett (1928). Uncensored Dardanelles.
- Ellis Ashmead-Bartlett (1929). The Riddle of Russia. Series of 22 articles for the Daily Telegraph, 22 January-20 February 1929

== Bibliography ==
- Carlyon, Les (2001). Gallipoli. Macmillan. ISBN 0-7329-1128-1.
- Kowner, Rotem (2006). Historical Dictionary of the Russo-Japanese War. Scarecrow. ISBN 0-8108-4927-5.
- Leigh Rayment's Historical List of MPs

Parliament of the United Kingdom
Preceded by James Patrick Gardner	Member of Parliament for Hammersmith North; 1924–1926	Succeeded by James Patrick Gardner
