= Andrew Hichens =

English cricketer (1936–2026)

Personal information
- Full name: Andrew Lionel Hichens
- Born: 24 August 1936; Westminster, London, England
- Died: 5 January 2026 (aged 89)
- Batting: Right-handed
- Bowling: Right-arm fast-medium
- Relatives: Neville Lyttelton (grandfather)

Domestic team information
- Years: Team
- 1957–1959: Oxford University
- 1957–1964: Oxfordshire

Career statistics
Competition	First-class
Matches	3
Runs scored	4
Batting average	2.00
100s/50s	0/0
Top score	4
Balls bowled	424
Wickets	6
Bowling average	45.00
5 wickets in innings	0
10 wickets in match	0
Best bowling	4/97
Catches/stumpings	0/–
- Source: Cricinfo, 24 June 2019

Andrew Lionel Hichens (24 August 1936 – 5 January 2026) was an English first-class cricketer.

== Biography ==
The son of Lionel Hichens and his wife, Mary Hermione Hichens (daughter of Sir Neville Lyttelton), he was born at Westminster in August 1936. His father was killed during The Blitz in 1940, while his eldest brother, John, was killed during the Normandy landings. He was educated at Winchester College between 1950 and 1954, before going up to Trinity College, Oxford.

While studying at Oxford, Hichens made his debut in first-class cricket for Oxford University against the Free Foresters at Oxford in 1957. He made two further first-class appearances for Oxford in 1959, against Essex and the Free Foresters. A fast-medium bowler, he took six wickets across his three matches, with best figures of 4 for 97.

In addition to playing first-class cricket, Hichens also played minor counties cricket for Oxfordshire between 1957 and 1964, making 37 appearances in the Minor Counties Championship and taking 134 wickets. His best figures for Oxfordshire were 7 for 41 against Buckinghamshire in 1957. His opportunities to play cricket were limited by his work as a farmer.

Hichens died on 5 January 2026, at the age of 89.
