= 1926 Hammersmith North by-election =

UK Parliamentary by-election

The 1926 Hammersmith North by-election was held on 20 May 1926. The by-election was held due to the resignation of the incumbent Conservative MP, Ellis Ashmead-Bartlett. It was won by the Labour candidate James Patrick Gardner.

== Background ==
James Patrick Gardner had first contested the seat in 1922, and while he had failed to win he had come second in a seat Labour had finished in fourth place in 1918. He had then been elected as the MP for Hammersmith North at the 1923 general election, gaining the seat from the Conservatives by a majority of 845 votes in a three-way contest. He actually increased his vote share at the 1924 election, but with the Liberals not fielding a candidate, he lost to Ashmead-Bartlett by just under 2,000 votes in a two-way context.

Samuel Gluckstein had been the Conservative's candidate at Plymouth Devonport at the previous general election, but had failed to win the seat.

== Result ==
Hammersmith North by-election, 1926
Party	Candidate	Votes	%	±%
Labour	James Patrick Gardner	13,095	53.4	+7.5
Unionist	Samuel Gluckstein	9,484	38.6	−15.5
Liberal	George Paton Murfitt	1,974	8.0	New
Majority		3,611	14.8	N/A
Turnout		24,553	72.2	−2.0
Labour gain from Unionist		Swing	+11.5	
