= Denis Pritt =

British barrister and politician (1887–1972)

Denis Nowell Pritt
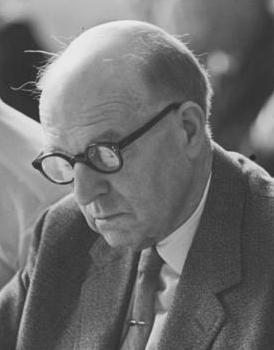
- Pritt acting as a foreign observer at the trial in absentia of Hans Globke in East Germany, 1963

Member of Parliament for Hammersmith North
- In office 14 November 1935 – 3 February 1950
- Preceded by: Fielding Reginald West
- Succeeded by: Frank Tomney

Chairman of the Labour Independent Group
- In office May 1949 – 23 February 1950
- Preceded by: Office established
- Succeeded by: Office abolished

Personal details
- Born: 22 September 1887 Harlesden, Middlesex
- Died: 23 May 1972 (aged 84) Pamber Heath, Hampshire
- Party: Labour (1918–1940)
- Other political affiliations: Labour Independent Group
- Education: University of London
- Profession: Barrister

Denis Nowell Pritt, QC (22 September 1887 – 23 May 1972) was a British barrister and left-wing Labour Party politician. Born in Harlesden, Middlesex, he was educated at Winchester College and the University of London.

A member of the Labour Party from 1918, he was a defender of the Soviet Union. In 1932, as part of G. D. H. Cole's New Fabian Research Bureau's expert commission of enquiry, he visited the Soviet Union, and, according to Margaret Cole, "the eminent KC swallowed it all". Pritt was expelled from the Labour Party in March 1940 following his support of the Soviet invasion of Finland.

Pritt was characterised by George Orwell as "perhaps the most effective pro-Soviet publicist in this country".

== Early life ==
Pritt was born on 22 September 1887 in London, the son of a metal merchant. He was educated at Winchester College, which he left after four years so as to relocate to Geneva in order to learn French, with a view to joining his father's company. Following his time in Switzerland, Pritt moved again to expand his linguistic knowledge, working in a bank in A Coruña, Spain, and improving his Spanish. Pritt also added German to his repertoire of languages in subsequent years.

Pritt was admitted to the Middle Temple on 1 May 1906 and was called to the bar on 17 November 1909. He continued to study law in 1909, obtaining a law degree from the University of London in 1910. He began his legal practice as a specialist in workmen's compensation cases.

He married in July 1914, on the eve of the First World War. During the war, he joined the postal censorship department in the British War Office. Following the war, Pritt returned to legal practice as a successful lawyer working in the field of commercial law.

== Political career ==
A Conservative in his earliest years, Pritt moved steadily leftward politically, joining the Liberal Party in 1914 and the Labour Party in 1918. Following a failed 1931 campaign for Parliament as a Labour candidate in Sunderland, Pritt was elected as a Labour Member of Parliament (MP) for Hammersmith North in 1935. Pritt was made a member of the Labour Party's executive committee in 1936, remaining in that role for over a year.

In 1936, he attended the first Moscow Show Trial, known as the Trial of the Sixteen. He wrote an account of this, The Zinoviev Trial, which largely supported Joseph Stalin and his first purge of the Communist Party.

In 1940, Pritt was expelled from the Labour Party for defending the Soviet invasion of Finland. His book Must the War Spread? sympathized with the Soviets and led him to be greatly disliked by the Labour Party elite during and after the war. After 1940, he sat as an Independent Labour member, and at the 1945 general election was re-elected in Hammersmith North under that label gaining a 63% share of the vote against official Labour and Conservative candidates. In 1949 he formed the Labour Independent Group with four other fellow travellers, including John Platts-Mills and Konni Zilliacus, who had also been expelled from the Labour Party for pro-Soviet sympathies. At the general election of 1950, all the members of the Labour Independent Group lost their seats. By this time, Pritt's opposition to the Cold War and NATO had made him an "unpopular figure" in Britain.

Pritt was awarded the 1954 International Stalin Peace Prize and in 1957 became an honorary citizen of Leipzig, which was then in East Germany. East Germany also awarded him the Gold Stern der Völkerfreundschaft (Star of People's Friendship) in October 1965.

== Legal career ==
At the end of June 1931, Pritt represented Bell and Snelling in Bell v Lever Bros Ltd, a landmark case establishing the principles for common mistake in common law. His "skill and tenacity" was an important reason why Bell and Snelling succeeded.

In 1931, Pritt represented three Indian revolutionaries, Bhagat Singh, Sukhdev Thapar and Shivaram Rajguru before the Privy Council, arguing that the ordinance which had been used to establish a special tribunal to try them for the crime of murdering a policeman was ultra vires. The appeal was rejected, and the three men were executed by hanging within a month of their trial on 23 March 1931. Pritt successfully defended Ho Chi Minh in 1931 against a French request for his extradition from Hong Kong. In 1933, Pritt was chairman of the "International Commission of Inquiry into the Clarification of the Reichstag Fire", the so-called "London Counter-Process" to the Leipzig Reichstag Fire Process. In 1942, he initially defended Gordon Cummins but, due to a technicality, the trial was abandoned and restarted with a new jury, and Pritt was replaced by another lawyer. Cummins, then a serving member of the Royal Air Force, was known in the press as the Blackout Ripper and was accused of murdering four women, mutilating their bodies and attempting to murder two others. The defence was unsuccessful, a subsequent appeal was dismissed and Cummins was hanged in June 1942.

Pritt's most high-profile case, which he lost, was defending the Kapenguria Six, a group of Kenyan political figures accused in 1952 of links with the Mau Mau: Jomo Kenyatta, Bildad Kaggia, Kung’u Karumba, Fred Kubai, Paul Ngei and Achieng Oneko. In this case, Pritt worked with a team of African, Indian and Afro-Caribbean lawyers including Achhroo Ram Kapila, H. O. Davies, Dudley Thompson, and Fitz Remedios Santana de Souza.

Pritt played a significant role in the Singaporean "Fajar trial" in May 1954. He was the lead counsel of the University Socialist Club with the assistance of Lee Kuan Yew as the junior counsel and helped the club to win the case eventually. From 1965 to 1966, he was Professor of Law at the University of Ghana.

Pritt was said to have encouraged Billy Strachan, a fellow communist activist and one of the pioneers of black civil rights in Britain, to study law. Strachan then went onto be elected the President of Inner London Justices' Clerks' Society, and became an expert in laws regarding adoption, marriage, and drink driving.

== Death and legacy ==
Pritt died in 1972 at his home in Pamber Heath, Hampshire. Denis Pritt Road in Nairobi, Kenya is named after him.

Pritt is one of those on Orwell's list, a list prepared by George Orwell for the Information Research Department in 1949, after the start of the Cold War. The list was officially published in 2003, but had circulated before then. It listed notable writers and others whom Orwell considered to be sympathetic to the Soviet Union. In the document, Orwell noted that Pritt was "almost certainly underground Communist", but also a "Good MP (i.e. locally). Very able and courageous".

== Bibliography ==
To read online copies see Internet Archive

- Light on Moscow (1939)
- Must the War Spread? (1940)
- Federal Illusion (1940)
- Choose your Future (1940)
- The Fall of the French Republic (1940)
- USSR Our Ally (1941)
- India Our Ally? (1946)
- Revolt in Europe (1947)
- A New World Grows (1947)
- Star-Spangled Shadow (1947)
- The State Department and the Cold War (1948)
- Spies and Informers in the Witness-box (1958)
- Liberty in Chains (1962)
- The Labour Government, 1945–1951 (1963)
- Neo-Nazis, the Danger of War (1966)
- Autobiography
  - From Right to Left (1965)
  - Brasshats and Bureaucrats (1966)
  - The Defence Accuses (1966)
- Law, Class and Society (in four books)
  - Employers, Workers and Trade Unions (1970)
  - The Apparatus of Law (1971)
  - Law and Politics and Law in the Colonies (1971)
  - The Substance of Law (1972)

== Footnotes ==
Parliament of the United Kingdom
| Preceded by Fielding West | Member of Parliament for Hammersmith North; 1935 – 1950 | Succeeded by Frank Tomney |
