= William Babtie =

British Army general and recipient of the Victoria Cross (1859–1920)

Lieutenant-General Sir William Babtie VC KCB KCMG KStJ
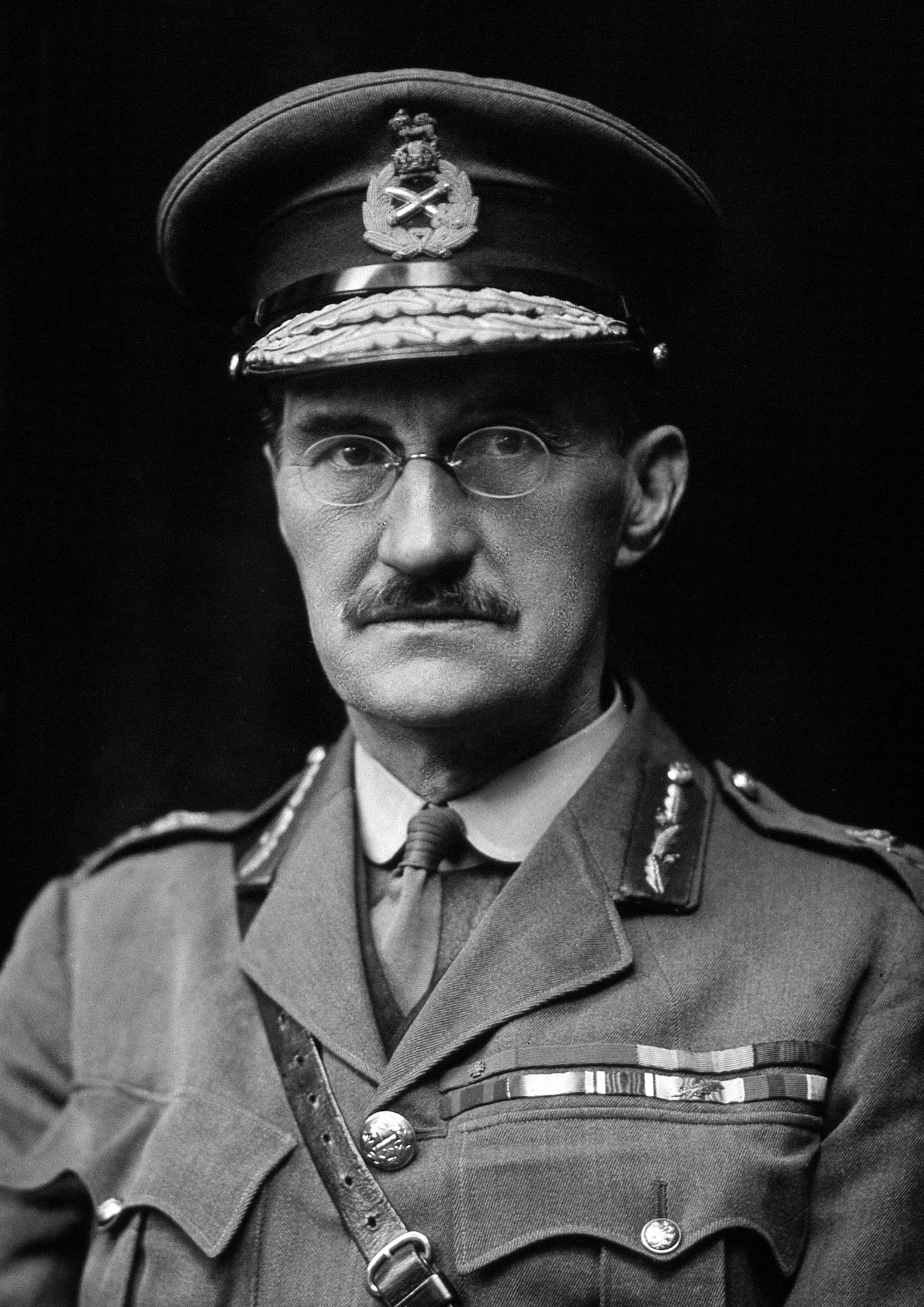
- Born: 7 May 1859; Dumbarton, Scotland
- Died: 11 August 1920 (aged 61); Knokke, Belgium
- Burial place: Stoke Cemetery, Guildford
- Military career
- Allegiance: United Kingdom
- Branch: British Army
- Service years: 1881–1919
- Rank: Lieutenant-General
- Units: Royal Army Medical Corps
- Commands: Director General Army Medical Services
- Conflicts: Occupation of Crete; Second Boer War; First World War
- Awards: Victoria Cross; Knight Commander of the Order of the Bath; Knight Commander of the Order of St Michael and St George; Mentioned in Despatches

Lieutenant-General Sir William Babtie, VC, KCB, KCMG, KStJ (7 May 1859 – 11 September 1920) was a British Army officer, a physician and a Scottish recipient of the Victoria Cross, the highest award for gallantry in the face of the enemy that can be awarded to British and Commonwealth armed forces. His Victoria Cross is displayed at the Army Medical Services Museum in Aldershot.

== Early career ==
Babtie graduated from the University of Glasgow with a Bachelor of Medicine and also received the LRCP and LRCS from the University of Edinburgh Medical School in 1880.

== South Africa and the Victoria Cross ==
Babtie was 40 years old, and a major in the Royal Army Medical Corps, British Army, during the Second Boer War on 15 December 1899 at the Battle of Colenso when he won his Victoria Cross (VC). He exposed himself to heavy fire to tend to the wounded including going with Captain Walter Congreve to bring in Lieutenant Frederick Roberts, who was lying wounded on the veldt. The full citation was published in the London Gazette on 20 April 1900 and reads:

At Colenso, on the 10th December, 1899, the wounded of the 14th and 66th Batteries, Royal Field Artillery, were lying in an advanced donga close in the rear of the guns without any Medical Officer to attend to them, and when a message was sent back asking for assistance, Major W. Babtie, R A.M.C., rode up under a heavy rifle fire, his pony being hit three times. When he arrived at the donga, where the wounded were lying in sheltered corners, he attended to them all, going from place to place exposed to the heavy rifle fire which greeted anyone who showed himself. Later on in the day, Major Babtie went out with Captain Congreve to bring in Lieutenant Roberts, who was lying wounded on the veldt. This also was under a heavy fire.

Babtie had previously been made a Companion of the Order of St Michael and St George in June 1899 for services rendered in the occupation of Crete.

== After South Africa ==
Babtie was promoted to lieutenant colonel on 29 November 1900, and was in early January 1901 appointed for temporary duties in the Home District as he returned to the United Kingdom. He was appointed Assistant-Director, Army Medical Service in that June. In 1903 he was made a Knight of the Venerable Order of Saint John. He was promoted to colonel in 1907, and appointed Inspector of Medical Services. In 1910 he was appointed Deputy Director-General of Medical Services and granted the temporary rank of surgeon-general. The rank was made permanent in 1911. He was appointed a Companion of the Order of the Bath in the 1912 King's Birthday Honours. On 1 June 1914 he was appointed Honorary Surgeon to the King, holding the post until 7 May 1919.

== First World War ==
Babtie was appointed Director, Medical Services for the British Indian Army in March 1914. He was responsible for medical provision on both the Mesopotamian campaign and the Dardanelles Campaign. He was Mentioned in Despatches for his services in the Dardanelles. He was appointed Director of Medical Services at the War Office on 18 March 1916. He became Inspector of Medical Services with the temporary rank of lieutenant-general on 1 March 1918.

However, he was severely criticised by the Mesopotamia Commission of Inquiry and received further criticism for similar failings at Gallipoli.

Babtie was appointed a Knight Commander of the Order of the Bath in the 1919 King's Birthday Honours.
