= Frank Tomney =

British politician (1908–1984)

Frank Tomney (24 May 1908 – 19 September 1984) was a British Labour Party politician.

Born in Bolton, Lancashire, Tomney found himself jobless during the Great Depression and walked to London in search of employment. After arriving in London he moved into the Rowton House in Hammersmith, a hostel for working men. This was to be the beginning of a long association with that area of west London.

Tomney obtained work as a night-watchman in a glass blowing factory, and became an active trade unionist. From 1940 he was branch secretary of the General and Municipal Workers Union.

With an approaching general election in 1950, the Labour Party found itself without a candidate at Hammersmith North. The sitting Member of Parliament, D. N. Pritt, had been expelled from the party and had won the seat in 1945 as a member of the left-wing Labour Independent Group. Tomney volunteered to stand, and was comfortably elected with a majority of nearly 3,000 votes over Pritt. He was re-elected at each election until he stood down in 1979, and was seen as being on the right wing of the Labour Party, a fact that was often to lead to conflict within the constituency party in Hammersmith North.

In 1976 Tomney was deselected by his constituency party. This was partly a result of his having right-wing views on homosexuality, race and capital punishment which one party official described as being closer to the policies of the National Front.

Tomney took an interest in European and international affairs, and was a delegate to the Council of Europe and the Western European Union on a number of occasions between 1963 and 1979. In 1968 he was leader of the United Kingdom delegation to the United Nations, and from 1976 to 1977 was a Member of the European Parliament. He was opposed to sanctions against Rhodesia.

He lived in Rickmansworth, Hertfordshire, and was a member of Watford Town Council from 1946 to 1950 and of Hertfordshire County Council from 1950 to 1954.

Tomney retired from the House of Commons in 1979. He died aged 76 in Hillingdon Hospital.

Parliament of the United Kingdom
Preceded by Denis Nowell Pritt	Member of Parliament for Hammersmith North; 1950–1979	Succeeded by Clive Soley
