= William Nicholson, 1st Baron Nicholson =

British Army officer (1845–1918)

Field Marshal The Right Honourable The Lord Nicholson GCB
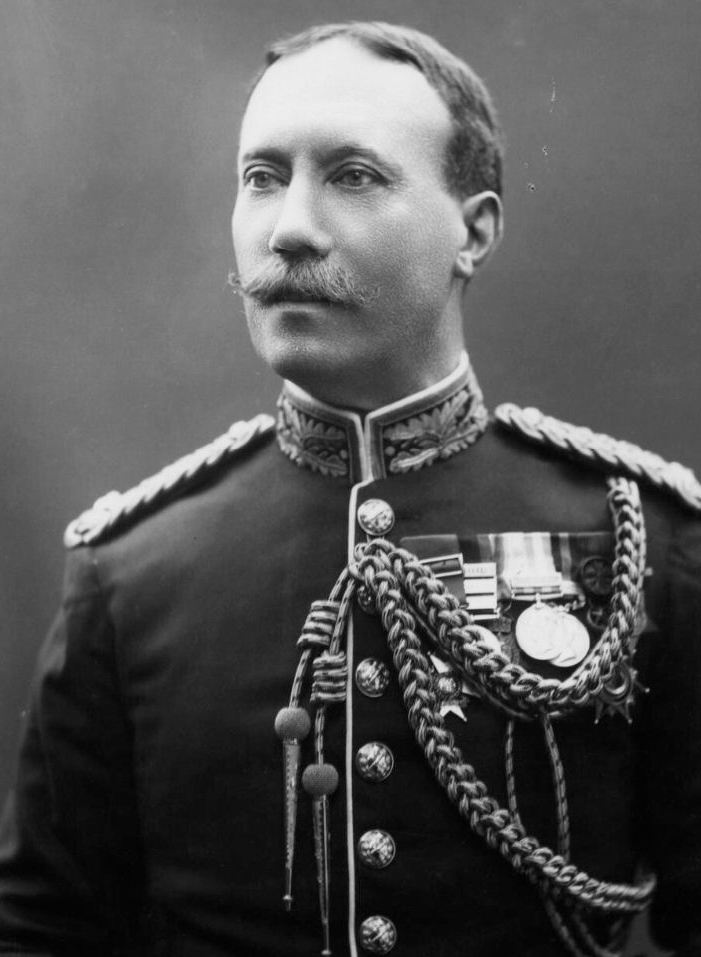
- Born: 2 March 1845; Roundhay Park, Leeds, England
- Died: 13 September 1918 (aged 73); London, England
- Military career
- Allegiance: United Kingdom
- Branch: British Army
- Service years: 1865–1912; 1914–1918
- Rank: Field Marshal
- Commands: Chief of the Imperial General Staff
- Conflicts: Second Anglo-Afghan War: Battle of Kandahar; Mahdist War; Third Anglo-Burmese War; Second Boer War; First World War
- Awards: Knight Grand Cross of the Order of the Bath; Mentioned in Despatches; Order of Osmanieh, 4th Class (Ottoman Empire)

Field Marshal William Gustavus Nicholson, 1st Baron Nicholson, GCB (2 March 1845 – 13 September 1918) was a British Army officer who served in the Second Anglo-Afghan War, the Mahdist War, the Third Anglo-Burmese War, the Second Boer War and the First World War. He became Chief of the Imperial General Staff and was closely involved in the reorganisation of the British Army in the early years of the 20th century.

== Early life ==
Nicholson was born in Roundhay, Leeds, the second-youngest son of William Nicholson Nicholson (who had been born with the surname of Phillips but in 1827 assumed his mother's surname of Nicholson) and Martha Nicholson (née Rhodes). Nicholson graduated from Leeds Grammar School in 1863 and entered the Royal Military Academy, Woolwich, where he was awarded the Pollock Medal the following year.

== Military career ==
=== Early career ===
Nicholson was commissioned as a lieutenant in the Royal Engineers on 21 March 1865. From 1868 to 1871 he was employed on coastal fortification work in Barbados, West Indies. Following this he was posted to India, with the Public Works Department at Hyderabad, the Punjab Irrigation Branch, and at Rawalpindi and Peshawar on barrack work and the construction of Army waterworks.

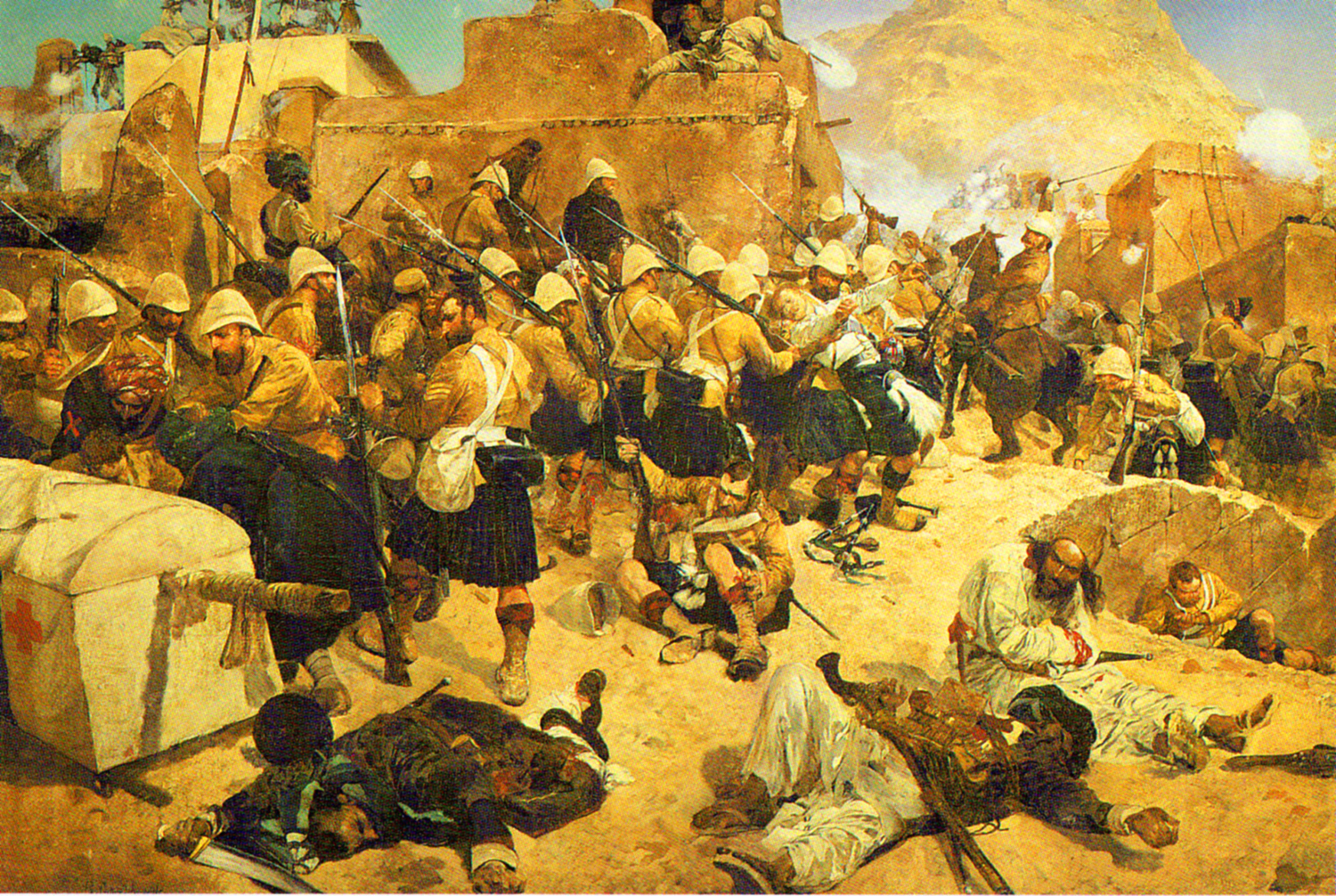
The Battle of Kandahar, at which Nicholson was present, during the Second Anglo-Afghan War

Nicholson was promoted to the rank of captain on 16 March 1878, and posted to Afghanistan, seeing service in the Second Anglo-Afghan War. He served in the first campaign as Field Engineer, Kandahar Field Force from 10 October 1878 to 5 March 1879, and as Royal Engineers Commander for the Thal-Chotiali Field Force from 6 March to 30 April 1879. During the second campaign of the war he served first as Field Engineer, 1st Division, Kabul Field Force from 23 September 1879 until 7 August 1880, being present at the action near Surkai Kotal on 14 October 1879, the defence of the Shutargardan in October 1879 and the defence of the Lataband in December 1879. He then served as Field Engineer, Kabul-Kandahar Field Force, taking part in the advance to the relief of Kandahar, and being present at the Battle of Kandahar. During the Afghanistan campaigns, he was three times mentioned in despatches and was awarded a campaign medal with three clasps.

He was appointed Secretary of the Defence Committee at Simla in 1880 and was given the brevet rank of major on 1 March 1881. His time as secretary was interrupted by service in Egypt in 1882, where he served with the Indian contingent in the Egyptian Campaign. His force made a successful flanking movement at the battle of Tel-el-Kebir and opened up the way to Cairo by cutting the enemy's railway system near Zagazig, where Nicholson, then with the cavalry, captured four trains under steam, which were later used to transport British infantry. His efforts earned him another campaign medal with clasp, the Order of Osmanieh (4th Class), and the Khedive's Star. He was promoted to the substantive rank of major on 21 March 1885.

From 1885 he served as Assistant Adjutant General, Royal Engineers in Bengal. Service in the Third Anglo-Burmese War, which stamped out the guerrilla activities that followed the overthrow of King Thibaw Min, earned Nicholson a further mention in despatches and promotion to the rank of brevet lieutenant colonel on 1 July 1887.

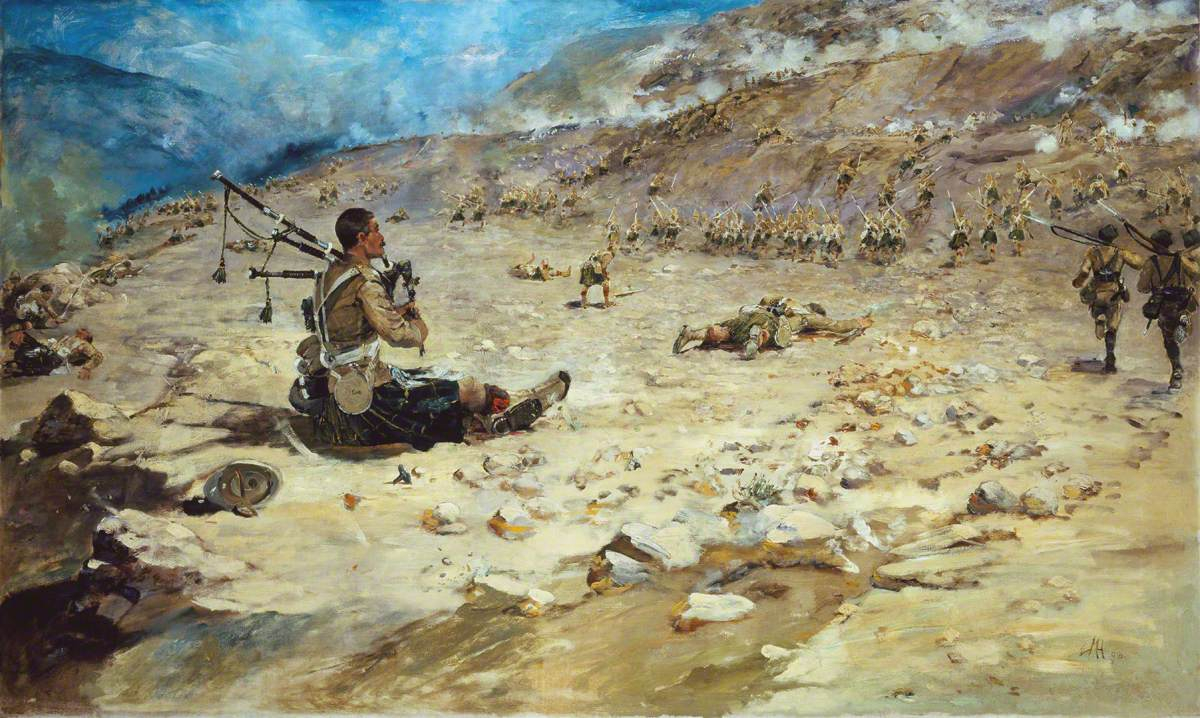
The Tirah Campaign, for which Nicholson served as Chief of Staff

Nicholson was appointed Military Secretary to Lord Roberts, Commander-in-Chief in India on 1 July 1890 and granted the substantive rank of colonel on 1 January 1891. He was appointed a Companion of the Order of the Bath in the Queen's Birthday Honours 1891. He was employed with the Military Works Department, India as a chief engineer from 1893 and was appointed Adjutant General for the Punjab with rank of brigadier general in 1895.

Nicholson saw service on the North West Frontier of India as Chief of Staff for the Tirah Campaign in 1897 to 1898. Lieutenant General Sir William Lockhart mentioned him in despatches referring to his "brilliant abilities" on 29 March 1898. He was awarded a campaign medal with two clasps and advanced to a Knight Commander of the Order of the Bath on 20 May 1898. He was made Adjutant-General in India on 24 February 1899.

=== Second Boer War ===
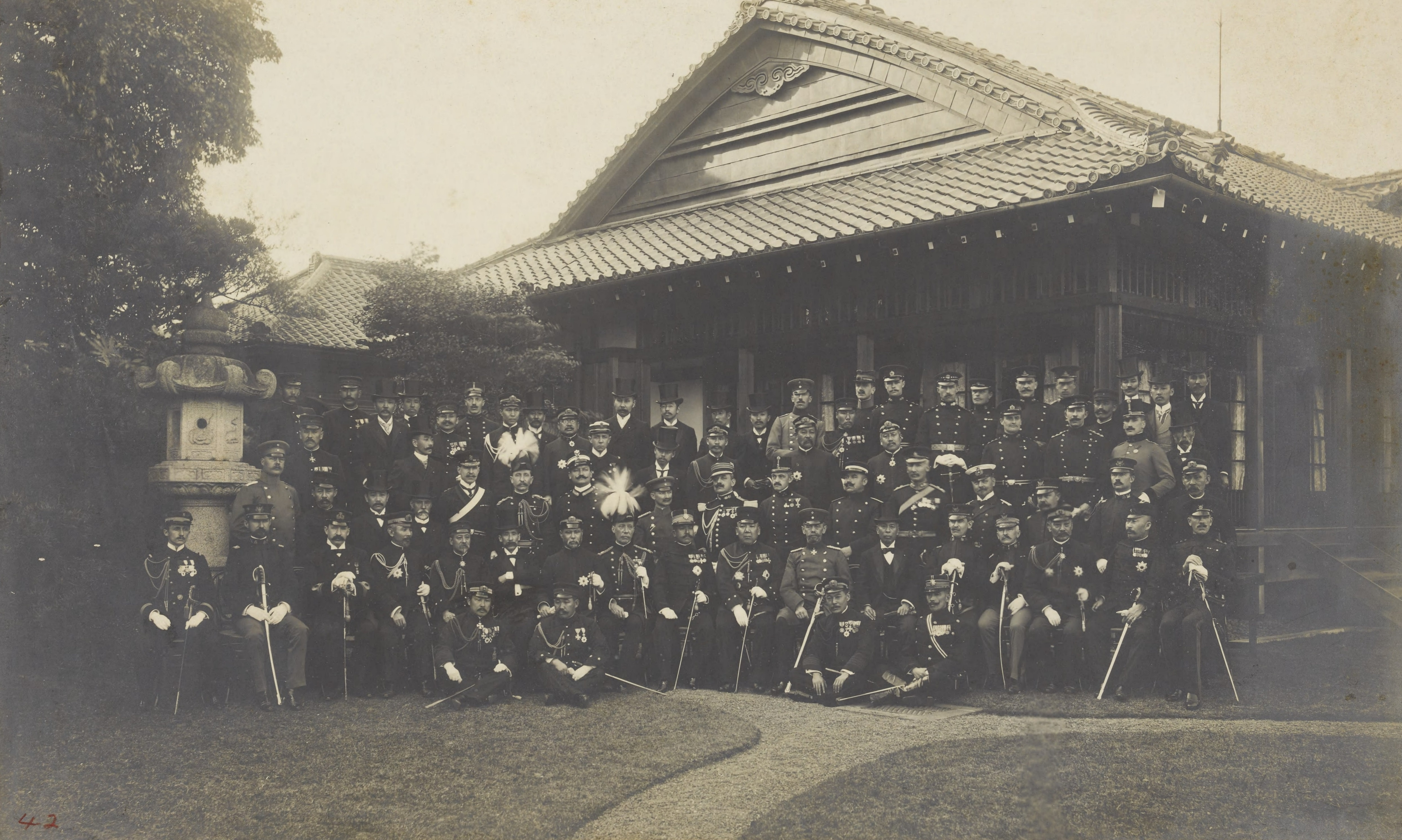
Foreign military attachés gathered at Shiba Palace in Tokyo. Nicholson visited Japan as Chief Military Attaché

He was again appointed as Military Secretary to Lord Roberts, now Commander-in-Chief in South Africa, on 23 December 1899 during the Second Boer War, and was granted the local rank of major-general. He went on to be Director of Transport on 18 February 1900. Nicholson was mentioned in Lord Roberts' despatch dated 31 March 1900: in this despatch Lord Roberts wrote, "...Colonel Sir W. Nicholson (local Major-Gen.), R.E., undertook, at my request, organisation of a transport department in the limited time available; he performed this duty with conspicuous ability." He was present at the Battle of Paardeberg and at the actions at Poplar Grove, Driefontein, Vet and Zand Rivers, and in operations near Johannesburg, Pretoria and Diamond Hill, and in the operations in the Transvaal, east of Pretoria, during the latter half of 1900. In the South African honours list published in April 1901, he was promoted to the substative rank of major-general for distinguished service in the field, dated 23 December 1899 (the date he was granted that rank locally in South Africa).

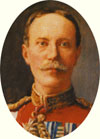
Portrait of Lord Nicholson by George Hall Neale

Nicholson returned to London in late December 1900, was appointed Director-General of Mobilisation and Military Intelligence at Headquarters on 1 May 1901 and was promoted to lieutenant general on 4 November 1901. Between May and September 1902, as part of the recent Anglo-Japanese Alliance, Nicholson negotiated secret military intelligence cooperation agreements with Major General Fukushima Yasumasa, of the Japanese General Staff. Fukushima was ostensibly in London to represent Emperor Meiji at the coronation of King Edward VII on 9 August. Nicholson was made a Knight of Grace of the Venerable Order of Saint John on 5 March 1903 and made Chief Military Attaché to the Imperial Japanese Army in Manchuria in 1904 during the Russo-Japanese War. He was appointed Quartermaster-General to the Forces and Member of the Army Council on 18 December 1905 earning promotion to general on 23 October 1906.

=== Chief of the General Staff ===
He was appointed as Chief of the General Staff (CGS) on 2 April 1908, and, having been advanced to a Knight Grand Cross of the Order of the Bath in the King's Birthday Honours 1908, found his role re-designated Chief of the Imperial General Staff (CIGS) on 22 November 1909. He was appointed aide-de-camp general to the King on 1 July 1910. In July 1910 he took part in the funeral procession following the death of King Edward VII.

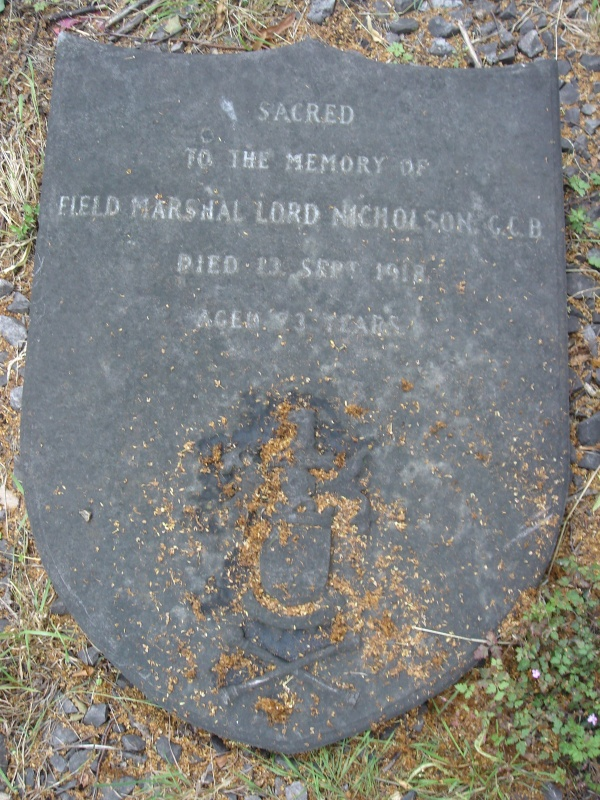
Funerary monument, Brompton Cemetery, London

As CIGS Nicholson was closely involved in the reorganisation of the British Army, consolidating the Territorial Force and the creation of a modern general staff. He was promoted to field marshal on 19 June 1911.

Nicholson had a sharp tongue and one occasion Admiral Fisher asked Maurice Hankey to stop "Old Nick" "stamping his hoof on his toes".

At the Committee of Imperial Defence meeting after the Agadir Crisis the First Sea Lord Admiral Arthur Wilson said that in the event of war the Navy planned to land the Army on the Baltic Coast. Nicholson asked Wilson whether the Admiralty had maps of German strategic railways (to show how the Germans could rush reinforcements to invasion spots), and when Wilson said it was not the Admiralty's business to have such maps, Nicholson openly rebuked him and said that if the Navy "meddled" in military matters they needed not just to have such maps but to have studied them. Prime Minister H.H. Asquith ordered the Navy to fall in with the Army's plans to deploy an Expeditionary Force to France.

Nicolson retired in March 1912 and was raised to the peerage as Baron Nicholson, of Roundhay in the County of York on 4 October 1912.

From autumn 1914, shortly after the outbreak of the First World War, he served on the Committee of Imperial Defence, investigating the conduct of operations in Gallipoli and Mesopotamia and in 1916 he was appointed to the Dardanelles Commission.

Nicolson was also colonel commandant, Royal Engineers from October 1916. His other duties included those of Chairman of the Territorial Forces Association for London. Less than two months before Armistice Day, Lord Nicholson died in his home at 15 Pont Street, London, aged 73. He left no heirs and the barony died with him. He was buried in Brompton Cemetery, London.

== Family ==
In 1871 he married Victorie d' Allier (née Dillon); they had no children.

Military offices
Preceded by Gerald Morton	Adjutant-General, India; 1898–1901	Succeeded by Sir Edmond Elles
Preceded by John Ardagh (As Director of Military Intelligence)	Director General of Mobilisation and Military Intelligence; 1901–1904	Succeeded by James Grierson (As Director of Military Operations)
Preceded by Sir Herbert Plumer	Quartermaster-General to the Forces; 1905–1908	Succeeded by Sir Herbert Miles
Preceded by Sir Neville Lyttleton	Chief of the General Staff; 1908–1909	Succeeded by Position abolished
Preceded by New position	Chief of the Imperial General Staff; 1909–1912	Succeeded by Sir John French
Peerage of the United Kingdom
New creation	Baron Nicholson; 1912–1918	Extinct
