= Hammersmith North (UK Parliament constituency) =

Parliamentary constituency in the United Kingdom, 1918–1983

- Former borough constituency for the House of Commons
- County: 1918–1965: County of London; 1965–1983: Greater London

1918–1983
- Seats: One
- Created from: Hammersmith
- Replaced by: Hammersmith

Hammersmith North was a borough constituency in the Metropolitan Borough of Hammersmith in West London. It returned one Member of Parliament (MP) to the House of Commons of the Parliament of the United Kingdom, elected by the first past the post system.

== History ==
The constituency was created when the Hammersmith constituency was divided for the 1918 general election.

In its early years the constituency regularly changed hands between Labour and the Conservatives, but it was a Labour seat from a by-election in 1934 until its abolition in 1983.

In 1966, 9.8% of the constituency was born in the New Commonwealth.

The constituency shared boundaries with the Hammersmith North electoral division for election of councillors to the Greater London Council at elections in 1973, 1977 and 1981.

It was abolished for the 1983 general election when it was partly replaced by a new Hammersmith constituency.

== Boundaries ==
=== 1918–1950 ===
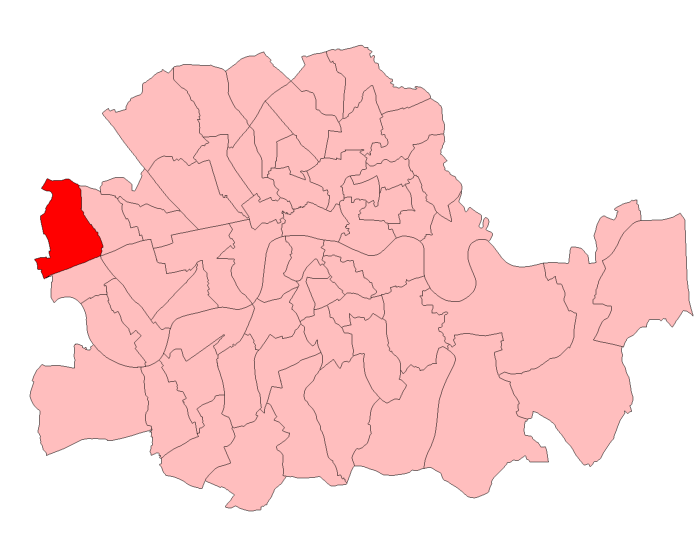
Hammersmith North 1918-50

A map showing the wards of Hammersmith Metropolitan Borough as they appeared in 1916.

The seat was created by the Representation of the People Act 1918, and was defined as consisting of wards Four, Five, Six and Seven of the Metropolitan Borough of Hammersmith.

=== 1950–1955 ===
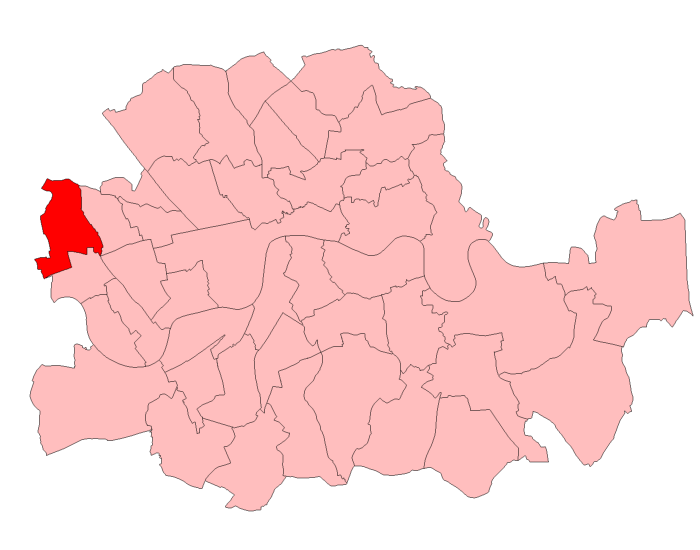
Hammersmith North 1950-55

The original boundaries were used until the 1950 general election. The wards of the metropolitan borough had been redrawn since 1918, and the seat was redefined by the Representation of the People Act 1948 as comprising six wards: College Park & Latimer, Coningham, Old Oak, Starch Green, White City and Wormholt.

=== 1955–1974 ===
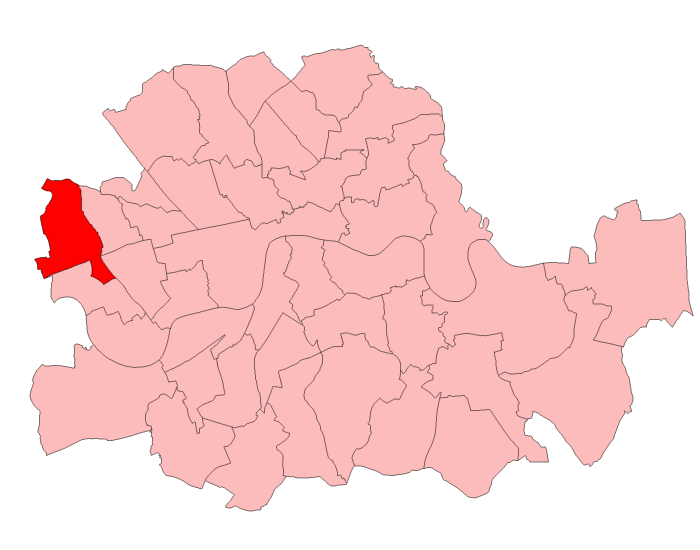
Hammersmith North 1955-74

The House of Commons (Redistribution of Seats) Act 1949 allowed for periodic reviews of constituency boundaries. Seats in the two metropolitan boroughs of Hammersmith and Fulham were redrawn prior to the 1955 general election. The neighbouring seat of Hammersmith South was abolished and the three wards of Addison, Olympia and St. Stephen's were transferred to the North constituency.

=== 1974–1983 ===
The last redrawing of the boundaries of the constituency took place prior to the February 1974 election. In 1965 the former metropolitan borough had become part of the larger London Borough of Hammersmith, and the seat was defined as consisting of ten wards of the London Borough, namely: Addison, Broadway, Brook Green, College Park & Old Oak, Coningham, Grove, St. Stephen's, Starch Green, White City and Wormholt.

== Members of Parliament ==
Election	Member	Party
1918	Sir Henry Foreman	Coalition Conservative
1922	Sir Henry Foreman	Conservative
1923	James Gardner	Labour
1924	Ellis Ashmead-Bartlett	Conservative
1926 by-election	James Gardner	Labour
1931	Mary Pickford	Conservative
1934 by-election	Fielding West	Labour
1935	Denis Pritt	Labour
1940	Denis Pritt	Independent Labour
1949	Denis Pritt	Labour Independent Group
1950	Frank Tomney	Labour
1979	Clive Soley	Labour
1983	constituency abolished : see Hammersmith	

== Election results ==
=== Election in the 1910s ===
General election 1918: Hammersmith North
Party		Candidate	Votes	%	±%
C	Unionist	Henry Foreman	5,785	46.5	
	Liberal	Ernest Young	2,542	20.4	
	National	James C Walker	2,075	16.7	
	Labour	Christopher Roland Morden	2,048	16.4	
Majority			3,243	26.1	
Turnout			12,450	46.7	
Registered electors			26,656		
	Unionist win (new seat)				
C indicates candidate endorsed by the coalition government.

=== Election in the 1920s ===
General election 1922: Hammersmith North
Party	Candidate	Votes	%	±%
Unionist	Henry Foreman	8,303	46.3	−0.2
Labour	James Gardner	5,350	29.8	+13.4
Liberal	Frederick L Coysh	4,278	23.9	+3.5
Majority		2,953	16.5	−9.6
Turnout		17,931	60.0	+13.3
Registered electors		29,904		
Unionist hold		Swing	−6.8	

General election 1923: Hammersmith North
Party	Candidate	Votes	%	±%
Labour	James Gardner	8,101	41.0	+11.2
Unionist	Ellis Ashmead-Bartlett	7,256	36.8	−9.5
Liberal	Frederick L. Coysh	4,374	22.2	−1.7
Majority		845	4.2	N/A
Turnout		19,731	63.0	+3.0
Registered electors		31,331		
Labour gain from Unionist		Swing	+10.4	

General election 1924: Hammersmith North
Party	Candidate	Votes	%	±%
Unionist	Ellis Ashmead-Bartlett	12,925	54.1	+17.3
Labour	James Gardner	10,970	45.9	+4.9
Majority		1,955	8.2	N/A
Turnout		23,895	74.2	+11.2
Registered electors		32,194		
Unionist gain from Labour		Swing	+6.2	

Hammersmith North by-election 1926
Party	Candidate	Votes	%	±%
Labour	James Gardner	13,095	53.4	+7.5
Unionist	Samuel Gluckstein	9,484	38.6	−15.5
Liberal	George Paton Murfitt	1,974	8.0	New
Majority		3,611	14.8	N/A
Turnout		24,553	72.2	−2.0
Registered electors		34,017		
Labour gain from Unionist		Swing	+11.5	

General election 1929: Hammersmith North
Party	Candidate	Votes	%	±%
Labour	James Gardner	17,601	56.2	+10.3
Unionist	(Harold Richard) Marshall Hays	13,744	43.8	−10.3
Majority		3,857	12.4	N/A
Turnout		31,345	70.0	−4.2
Registered electors		44,789		
Labour gain from Unionist		Swing	+10.3	

=== Election in the 1930s ===
General election 1931: Hammersmith North
Party	Candidate	Votes	%	±%
Conservative	Mary Pickford	18,815	59.2	+15.4
Labour	James Gardner	11,838	37.2	−19.0
Communist	Ted Bramley	697	2.2	New
New Party	R. E. N. Braden	431	1.4	New
Majority		6,977	22.0	N/A
Turnout		45,693	69.6	−0.4
Conservative gain from Labour		Swing		

Hammersmith North: By-election, 24 April 1934
Party	Candidate	Votes	%	±%
Labour	Fielding West	14,263	55.7	+18.5
Conservative	C. P. Davis	10,747	41.9	−17.3
Communist	Ted Bramley	614	2.4	+0.2
Majority		3,516	13.8	N/A
Turnout		45,216	56.7	−12.9
Labour gain from Conservative		Swing		

General election 1935: Hammersmith North
Party	Candidate	Votes	%	±%
Labour	D.N. Pritt	15,464	52.8	+15.6
Conservative	Norman Bower	13,830	47.2	−12.0
Majority		1,634	5.6	N/A
Turnout		44,570	65.7	−3.9
Labour gain from Conservative		Swing		

=== Election in the 1940s ===
General Election 1939–40

Another General Election was required to take place before the end of 1940. The political parties had been making preparations for an election to take place and by the Autumn of 1939, the following candidates had been selected, though Pritt was expelled from the Labour Party in 1940;

- Labour: D.N. Pritt
- Conservative: Leonard Caplan

General election 1945: Hammersmith North
Party	Candidate	Votes	%	±%
Labour Independent Group	D.N. Pritt	18,845	63.8	New
Conservative	Leonard Caplan	7,516	25.5	−21.7
Labour	W.H. Church	3,165	10.7	−42.1
Majority		11,329	38.3	N/A
Turnout		40,444	73.0	+7.3
Independent Labour gain from Labour		Swing		

=== Elections in the 1950s ===
General election 1950: Hammersmith North
Party	Candidate	Votes	%	±%
Labour	Frank Tomney	13,346	39.71	
Conservative	T Gee	10,406	30.96	
Labour Independent Group	D.N. Pritt	6,457	25.16	
Liberal	Hyman Mark Pick	1,402	4.17	New
Majority		2,940	8.75	N/A
Turnout		21,611	81.05	
Labour gain from Independent Labour		Swing		

General election 1951: Hammersmith North
Party	Candidate	Votes	%	±%
Labour	Frank Tomney	22,709	66.13	
Conservative	John Howard	11,629	33.87	
Majority		11,080	32.26	
Turnout		34,338	81.17	
Labour hold		Swing		

General election 1955: Hammersmith North
Party	Candidate	Votes	%	±%
Labour	Frank Tomney	24,280	61.16	
Conservative	Andrew Bowden	15,417	38.84	
Majority		8,863	22.32	
Turnout		39,697	70.04	
Labour hold		Swing		

General election 1959: Hammersmith North
Party	Candidate	Votes	%	±%
Labour	Frank Tomney	21,409	59.35	
Conservative	William David Armstrong Bagnell	14,662	40.65	
Majority		6,747	18.70	
Turnout		36,071	69.80	
Labour hold		Swing		

=== Elections in the 1960s ===
General election 1964: Hammersmith North
Party	Candidate	Votes	%	±%
Labour	Frank Tomney	18,547	62.91	
Conservative	Tom Stacey	10,936	37.09	
Majority		7,611	25.82	
Turnout		29,483	63.11	
Labour hold		Swing		

General election 1966: Hammersmith North
Party	Candidate	Votes	%	±%
Labour	Frank Tomney	19,522	68.79	
Conservative	Michael Neubert	8,857	31.21	
Majority		10,665	37.58	
Turnout		28,379	63.92	
Labour hold		Swing		

=== Elections in the 1970s ===
General election 1970: Hammersmith North
Party	Candidate	Votes	%	±%
Labour	Frank Tomney	16,145	62.67	
Conservative	Ian Stewart	9,615	37.33	
Majority		6,530	25.34	
Turnout		25,760	62.04	
Labour hold		Swing		

General election February 1974: Hammersmith North
Party	Candidate	Votes	%	±%
Labour	Frank Tomney	18,970	49.45	
Conservative	RG Beckett	11,929	31.10	
Liberal	Simon Harold John Arthur Knott	7,460	19.45	New
Majority		7,041	18.35	
Turnout		38,359	73.72	
Labour hold		Swing		

General election October 1974: Hammersmith North
Party	Candidate	Votes	%	±%
Labour	Frank Tomney	18,061	53.38	
Conservative	RG Beckett	9,939	29.38	
Liberal	Simon Harold John Arthur Knott	5,200	15.37	
Independent	JP McFadden	633	1.87	New
Majority		8,122	24.00	
Turnout		33,833	64.60	
Labour hold		Swing		

General election 1979: Hammersmith North
Party	Candidate	Votes	%	±%
Labour	Clive Soley	17,241	48.19	
Conservative	Jeremy Cripps	13,735	38.39	
Liberal	Simon Harold John Arthur Knott	4,147	11.59	
National Front	Robert Pearse	462	1.29	New
Workers Revolutionary	Calvin Stewart	193	0.54	New
Majority		3,506	9.80	
Turnout		35,778	70.40	
Labour hold		Swing		
