= Samuel Gluckstein =

British solicitor and politician (1880–1958)

Sir Samuel Gluckstein (28 September 1880 – 19 August 1958) was a British solicitor and politician.

== Early life ==
He was the son of Isidore Gluckstein (1851-1920), son of one of the founders of J. Lyons and Co. (Samuel Gluckstein), and his wife Rose (née Cohen). Gluckstein was educated at the City of London School and privately.

== Career ==
He subsequently studied law and became a partner in the Bartlett & Gluckstein, solicitors. In 1906, he entered local politics when he was elected to Westminster City Council as a Municipal Reform Party councillor. The Municipal Reformers were allied to the parliamentary Conservative Party. He was Mayor of Westminster in 1920-21 and became an alderman in 1924. In 1953 he was made an honorary freeman of Westminster.

In 1929 he became a member of the London County Council, sitting as a councillor representing Westminster, Abbey until 1949.

He was chairman of the council's finance committee in 1932-34 and Deputy Chairman of the County Council in 1939-40.

Gluckstein made three unsuccessful attempts to win parliamentary seats for the Conservatives: at Plymouth, Devonport in 1924 and 1929, and at Hammersmith North in 1926.

He was a member of the Court of the University of London, by whom he was awarded an honorary degree in law.

He was knighted in 1933 "for political and public services in Westminster".

== Personal life ==
In 1909 he married Julia, daughter of Samuel Joseph. The couple had no children.

Political offices
Preceded by Angus Scott	Chairman of the Finance Committee of London County Council; 1932–1934	Succeeded by Charles Latham
