= King Sterndale =

Village in Derbyshire, England

Coordinates: 53.246°N 1.859°W

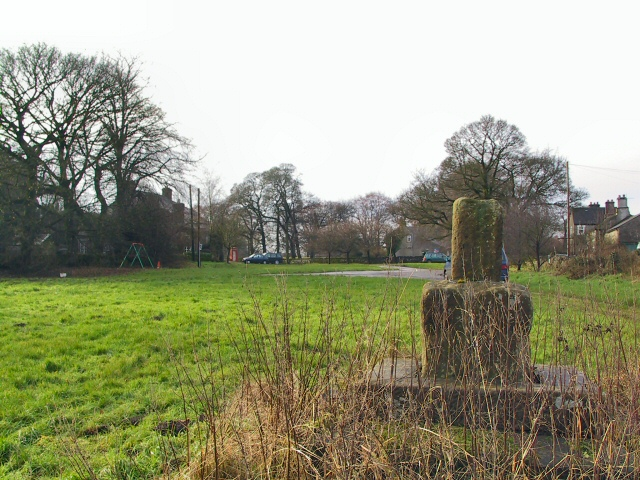
- The village green, King Sterndale.

- Location within Derbyshire
- Population: 133 (2011)
- OS grid reference: SK095721
- District: High Peak
- Shire county: Derbyshire
- Region: East Midlands
- Country: England
- Sovereign state: United Kingdom
- Post town: BUXTON
- Postcode district: SK17
- Police: Derbyshire
- Fire: Derbyshire
- Ambulance: East Midlands

King Sterndale is a village and civil parish in Derbyshire, England. It is located in the Peak District, 4 miles east of Buxton. It has a population of about 30, increasing to 133 at the 2011 Census. The two hamlets of Cowdale and Staden also lie within the parish.

== History ==
The village has a butter cross which was restored in 1937. Unusually, vehicular access to the village is only available from one direction, via a road/piece of land that is twenty metres wide. This land was created as a result of an enclosure in 1773. The route of the road changed slightly as a result of the church's construction in 1847.

The village is the Derbyshire seat of the Pickford family, founders of the moving company Pickfords.

Deep Dale is a steep gorge to the south east of King Sterndale. It has a protected nature reserve and is a Site of Special Scientific Interest (SSSI). In the late 19th century a bear's skull and many Roman artefacts were discovered in Thirst House Cave in Deep Dale.

Topley Pike Quarry is a large limestone quarry 200m east of the village. It was opened in 1907 by Messrs. Newton Chambers & Co. and is currently operated by Tarmac Roadstone Holdings Ltd.

== See also ==
- Listed buildings in King Sterndale
