= Kensington North (London County Council constituency) =

London County Council constituency

- Former constituency for the London County Council

Former constituency
- Created: 1889; 136 years ago
- Abolished: 1965; 60 years ago
- Member(s): 2 (to 1949); 3 (from 1949)

Kensington North was a constituency used for elections to the London County Council between 1889 and the council's abolition, in 1965. The seat shared boundaries with the UK Parliament constituency of the same name.

== Councillors ==
Year	Name	Party	Name	Party	Name	Party
1889	Frederick Frye	Progressive	John Lloyd	Progressive	Two seats until 1949	
1892	Frederick Charles Baum	Progressive	John Lloyd	Progressive	Two seats until 1949	
1892	Richard Baxter Doake	Progressive	John Lloyd	Progressive	Two seats until 1949	
1895	William Henry Fox	Moderate	James Biggs Porter	Moderate	Two seats until 1949	
1898	George Edmund Septimus Fryer	Moderate	James Biggs Porter	Moderate	Two seats until 1949	
1901	Henry Lorenzo Jephson	Progressive	Walter Pope	Progressive	Two seats until 1949	
1907	David Davis	Municipal Reform	Charles Lancelot Andrewes Skinner	Municipal Reform	Two seats until 1949	
1911	David Davis	Municipal Reform	Cecil Levita	Municipal Reform	Two seats until 1949	
1930	Patrick Buchan-Hepburn	Municipal Reform	Cecil Levita	Municipal Reform	Two seats until 1949	
1931	Henry Robinson	Municipal Reform	Cecil Levita	Municipal Reform	Two seats until 1949	
1937	Helen Bentwich	Labour	Ivan Power	Labour	Two seats until 1949	
1940	Helen Bentwich	Labour	Donald Daines	Labour	Two seats until 1949	
1946	Leonard Foster Browne	Labour	Eva Hubback	Labour	Two seats until 1949	
1949	Francis J. Clark	Conservative	Edith Deakin	Conservative	Denis Charles Griffiths	Conservative
1949	Francis J. Clark	Conservative	Edith Deakin	Conservative	Jack Cooper	Labour
1952	Olive M. Wilson	Labour	Anna Grieves	Labour	Donald Chesworth	Labour

== Election results ==
1889 London County Council election: Kensington North
Party	Candidate	Votes	%	±%
Progressive	Frederick Frye	3,026		
Progressive	John Lloyd	2,163		
Moderate	Edward Morton Daniel	1,770		
Progressive	Joseph James Stansfeld	559		
Progressive win (new seat)				
Progressive win (new seat)				

1892 London County Council election: Kensington North
Party	Candidate	Votes	%	±%
Progressive	John Lloyd	2,738		
Progressive	Frederick Charles Baum	2,430		
Moderate	William Cecil	1,849		
Moderate	Harold Marcus Nunn	1,836		
Progressive hold		Swing		
Progressive hold		Swing		

1892 Kensington North by-election
Party	Candidate	Votes	%	±%
Progressive	Richard Baxter Doake	1,520		
Moderate	Harold Marcus Nunn	1,310		
Progressive hold		Swing		

1895 London County Council election: Kensington North
Party	Candidate	Votes	%	±%
Moderate	William Henry Fox	2,384		
Moderate	James Biggs Porter	2,346		
Progressive	John Lloyd	1,972		
Progressive	Richard Baxter Doake	1,889		
Ind. Labour Party	Fred Hammill	147		
Moderate gain from Progressive		Swing		
Moderate gain from Progressive		Swing		

1898 London County Council election: Kensington North
Party	Candidate	Votes	%	±%
Conservative	George Edmund Septimus Fryer	2,319		
Conservative	James Biggs Porter	2,293		
Progressive	John Lloyd	2,265		
Progressive	Richard Baxter Doake	2,209		
Conservative hold		Swing		
Conservative hold		Swing		

1901 London County Council election: Kensington North
Party	Candidate	Votes	%	±%
Progressive	Walter Pope	2,315	26.1	+1.2
Progressive	Henry Lorenzo Jephson	2,233	25.1	+0.8
Conservative	William Alexander Thomson	2,179	24.5	−1.0
Conservative	Hugh Morrison	2,156	24.3	−0.9
Progressive gain from Conservative		Swing		
Progressive gain from Conservative		Swing	+1.0	

1904 London County Council election: Kensington North
Party	Candidate	Votes	%	±%
Progressive	Walter Pope	3,232		
Progressive	Henry Lorenzo Jephson	3,203		
Conservative	W. W. Thompson	2,914		
Conservative	Percy de Worms	2,858		
Majority				
Progressive hold		Swing		

1907 London County Council election: Kensington North
Party	Candidate	Votes	%	±%
Municipal Reform	David Davis	4,418		
Municipal Reform	Charles Lancelot Andrewes Skinner	4,382		
Progressive	Henry Lorenzo Jephson	3,170		
Progressive	Walter Pope	3,181		
Majority				
Municipal Reform gain from Progressive		Swing		

1910 London County Council election: Kensington North
Party	Candidate	Votes	%	±%
Municipal Reform	David Davis	3,761		
Municipal Reform	Charles Lancelot Andrewes Skinner	3,714		
Progressive	Frank Murray Carson	2,990		
Labour	Ethel Bentham	2,724		
Majority				
Municipal Reform hold		Swing		

1913 London County Council election: Kensington North
Party	Candidate	Votes	%	±%
Municipal Reform	David Davis	4,025	29.0	+0.5
Municipal Reform	Cecil Levita	3,999	28.9	+0.7
Progressive	C. D'O. Cooper	1,895	13.7	−9.0
Progressive	G. S. Warren	1,844	13.3	−9.4
Labour	Ethel Bentham	1,099	7.9	−12.8
Labour	William Joseph Jarrett	998	7.2	−13.3
Majority		2,104	15.2	+9.7
Municipal Reform hold		Swing		
Municipal Reform hold		Swing		

1919 London County Council election: Kensington North
Party	Candidate	Votes	%	±%
Municipal Reform	David Davis	Unopposed	n/a	n/a
Municipal Reform	Cecil Levita	Unopposed	n/a	n/a
Municipal Reform hold		Swing	n/a	
Municipal Reform hold		Swing	n/a	

1922 London County Council election: Kensington North
Party	Candidate	Votes	%	±%
Municipal Reform	David Davis	6,364	31.9	n/a
Municipal Reform	Cecil Levita	6,234	31.3	n/a
Labour	Barbara Drake	3,687	18.5	n/a
Labour	E. C. Porton	3,646	18.3	n/a
Majority		2,547	12.8	n/a
Municipal Reform hold		Swing	n/a	
Municipal Reform hold		Swing	n/a	

1925 London County Council election: Kensington North
Party	Candidate	Votes	%	±%
Municipal Reform	David Davis	5,130		
Municipal Reform	Cecil Levita	4,696		
Labour	H. Forster	3,008		
Labour	Boris Dvorkovitz	2,676		
Independent	Harry Barnes	1,531		n/a
Majority				
Municipal Reform hold		Swing		
Municipal Reform hold		Swing		

1928 London County Council election: Kensington North
Party	Candidate	Votes	%	±%
Municipal Reform	Cecil Levita	5,756		
Municipal Reform	David Davis	5,732		
Labour	Walter David Little	4,694		
Labour	Maximillian Walter Geffen	4,588		
Majority				
Municipal Reform hold		Swing		
Municipal Reform hold		Swing		

1931 London County Council election: Kensington North
Party	Candidate	Votes	%	±%
Municipal Reform	Cecil Levita	6,279		
Municipal Reform	Henry Robinson	6,270		
Labour	P. Carter	2,448		
Labour	B. Dvorkovitz	2,352		
Majority				
Municipal Reform hold		Swing		
Municipal Reform hold		Swing		

1934 London County Council election: Kensington North
Party	Candidate	Votes	%	±%
Municipal Reform	Cecil Levita	6,062		
Municipal Reform	Henry Robinson	6,021		
Labour	F. Carter	5,884		
Labour	George Pearce Blizard	5,761		
Communist	G. Poole	234		
Communist	W. Rowe	196		
Majority				
Municipal Reform hold		Swing		
Municipal Reform hold		Swing		

1937 London County Council election: Kensington North
Party	Candidate	Votes	%	±%
Labour	Ivan Power	9,439		
Labour	Helen Bentwich	9,404		
Municipal Reform	J. Fox-Strangways	8,224		
Municipal Reform	Henry Robinson	8,055		
Majority				
Labour gain from Municipal Reform		Swing		
Labour gain from Municipal Reform		Swing		

1946 London County Council election: Kensington North
Party	Candidate	Votes	%	±%
Labour	Leonard Browne	6,098		
Labour	Eva Hubback	6,008		
Conservative	J. Fox-Strangways	4,766		
Conservative	L. M. Bosanquet	4,700		
Majority				
Labour hold		Swing		
Labour hold		Swing		

1949 London County Council election: Kensington North
Party	Candidate	Votes	%	±%
Conservative	Dennis Charles Griffiths	11,785		
Conservative	Edith Deakin	11,738		
Conservative	Francis J. Clark	11,670		
Labour	Leonard Browne	11,253		
Labour	F. Carter	11,157		
Labour	Eva Hubback	11,141		
Conservative win (new seat)				
Conservative gain from Labour		Swing		
Conservative gain from Labour		Swing		

Kensington North by-election, 1949
Party	Candidate	Votes	%	±%
Labour	Jack Cooper	14,197		
Conservative	Ian Percival	13,100		
Communist	John Eyre	464		
Common Wealth	Chrystal Cates	135		
Majority		1,097		
Turnout			52	+9
Labour gain from Conservative		Swing		

1952 London County Council election: Kensington North
Party	Candidate	Votes	%	±%
Labour	Anna Grieves	14,367		
Labour	Olive Wilson	14,231		
Labour	Donald Chesworth	13,860		
Conservative	Francis J. Clark	11,354		
Conservative	Edith Deakin	11,338		
Conservative	C. Vernon-Plummer	11,289		
Labour gain from Conservative		Swing		
Labour gain from Conservative		Swing		
Labour gain from Conservative		Swing		

1955 London County Council election: Kensington North
Party	Candidate	Votes	%	±%
Labour	Donald Chesworth	9,979		
Labour	Anna Grieves	9,975		
Labour	Olive Wilson	9,829		
Conservative	H. Moore-Brabazon	9,401		
Conservative	A. F. H. Royle	9,316		
Conservative	L. Stallwood	9,275		
Labour hold		Swing		
Labour hold		Swing		
Labour hold		Swing		

1958 London County Council election: Kensington North
Party	Candidate	Votes	%	±%
Labour	Anna Grieves	10,753		
Labour	Olive Wilson	10,751		
Labour	Donald Chesworth	10,718		
Conservative	R. Bulbrook	6,745		
Conservative	A. Colpoys	6,673		
Conservative	H. Moore-Brabazon	6,606		
Labour hold		Swing		
Labour hold		Swing		
Labour hold		Swing		

1961 London County Council election: Kensington North
Party	Candidate	Votes	%	±%
Labour	Donald Chesworth	8,297		
Labour	Anna Grieves	8,152		
Labour	Olive Wilson	8,016		
Conservative	P. M. Hordern	7,046		
Conservative	L. Myers	7,007		
Conservative	F. K. Roberts	6,838		
Liberal	Yvonne Cameron Richardson	1,420		
Liberal	R. J. Bailey	1,326		
Liberal	R. Arnold	1,257		
Labour hold		Swing		
Labour hold		Swing		
Labour hold		Swing		
