= Henry Yorke Stanger =

British politician and judge (1849–1929)

Henry Yorke Stanger

His Honour Henry Yorke Stanger (11 November 1849 – 19 April 1929), was a British Liberal Party politician and judge.

He was born in Nottingham, the third son of George Eaton Stanger and Mary Hurst. He was educated at Lincoln College, Oxford (Scholar); Tancred Law Student; 2nd class Classical Moderations; 1st class Greats. He married in 1880, Henrietta Sophia Wastie Green, daughter of Rev. J. W. Green, rector of March. They had one son and two daughters.

== Legal career ==
He was called to the Bar in 1874. He was a Revising Barrister for Warwickshire in 1892–93–1894. He became a Queens Council in 1895. He became a Bencher of Lincoln's Inn in 1898. He was formerly a Member of the Midland Circuit. He served as Recorder of Nottingham from 1909 to 1911. He was a County Court Judge, for Circuit 7 from 1910 to 1914 and a County Court Judge for the Bristol Circuit (No. 54) from 1914 to 1922. He retired in 1922. He also served as a Justice of the Peace in Gloucestershire.

== Political career ==
He was a member of the Liberal Party. He first stood for parliament in a by-election in 1900 at the safe Conservative seat of Newark, when he was well beaten by the Conservative. A few months later at the 1900 General Election he switched seats to contest the more marginal Conservative seat of Nottingham South, but again finished second. By early 1903, the Liberal party asked him to contest a constituency in North-West London, and he was finally elected Liberal MP for Kensington North at the subsequent 1906 General election, gaining the seat for the Liberals from the Conservatives.

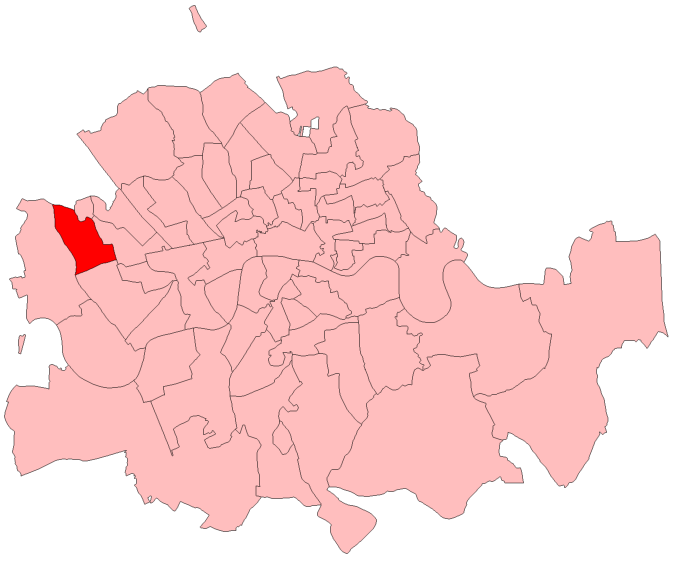
Kensington North

1906 General Election: Kensington, North Electorate
| Party | Candidate | Votes | % | ±% |
|---|---|---|---|---|
| Liberal | Henry Yorke Stanger | 4,416 | 56.8 | 13.1 |
| Conservative | William Ellis Hume-Williams | 3,358 | 43.2 | −13.1 |
| Majority | | 1,058 | 13.6 | |
| Turnout | | 10,270 | 75.7 | |
| Liberal gain from Conservative | | Swing | | |

He was a strong supporter of Votes for Women and in 1908 he introduced a Private member's bill in favour of Women's Suffrage. The bill made good progress before finally being blocked. He stood down after one term in January 1910. He was an Independent Chairman of the Nottinghamshire Joint Committee under the Coal Mines (Minimum Wage) Act 1912.

== Sources ==
- Who Was Who; http://www.ukwhoswho.com
- British parliamentary election results 1885–1918, Craig, F. W. S.

Parliament of the United Kingdom
| Preceded by William Edward Thompson Sharpe | Member of Parliament for Kensington North; 1906 – January 1910 | Succeeded by Alan Hughes Burgoyne |
