= Frances Henrietta Stewart =

A Liberal candidate in 1929 by a poster of Lloyd George

Frances Henrietta Stewart OBE (1883 – 26 September 1962), was a British politician and supporter of Indian nationalism.

== Background ==
She was born as Frances Henrietta Rickards, the daughter of Arthur G. Rickards, KC. She had a private education. In 1906 she married Francis Hugh Stewart, a Calcutta merchant. That year, she returned with him to India, where they lived and raised a family. They had three sons and four daughters. In 1916, her husband was knighted, which gave her the title of Lady Stewart. They returned to Britain in 1919. Sir Francis died in 1921.

== Political career ==
She joined the Liberal Party. She was an advocate of Indian independence and served as Honorary Secretary of the National Indian Association. She also took an active interest in infant and school welfare work. She was Liberal candidate for the Kensington North Division of London at the 1929 General Election. It was not a promising seat for the Liberals who had not won since 1906. She finished in third place;

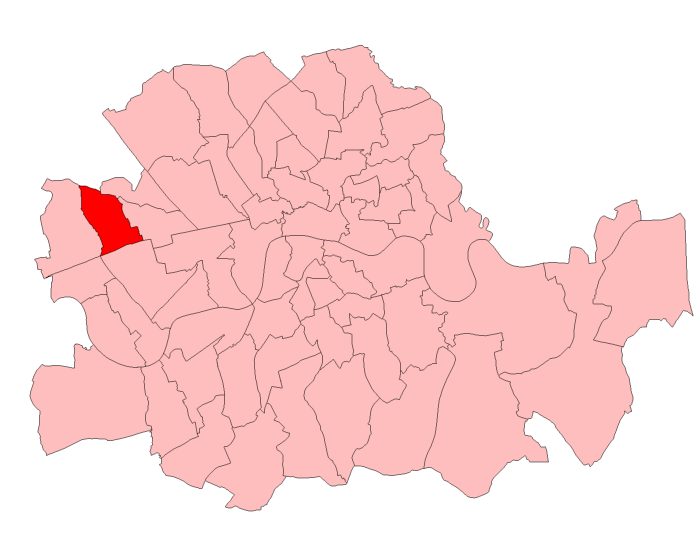
Kensington North in the County of London, showing boundaries used in 1929

General Election 30 May 1929: Kensington, North
Party	Candidate	Votes	%	±%
Labour	Fielding Reginald West	19,701	48.4	+1.4
Conservative	Percy George Gates	15,511	38.1	−14.9
Liberal	Lady Frances Henrietta Stewart	5,516	13.5	N/A
Majority		4,190	10.3	
Turnout		59,500	68.5	−1.1
Labour gain from Conservative		Swing	+8.2	

In 1930 she left the Liberals to join the Labour Party, and she stood unsuccessfully in Balham and Tooting at the 1931 London County Council election. In September 1931, when the Labour Party split over support for the National Government, she followed Labour Prime Minister Ramsay MacDonald and joined National Labour. She attempted to run as a National Labour candidate in Kensington North at the 1931 General Election, but when it became clear that supporters of the National Government were uniting behind the Conservative candidate, she withdrew. Although she continued to support National Labour throughout the 1930s, she did oppose the National Government's Nazi appeasement policy; in early 1939, before war broke out, she advocated the introduction of conscription and increased arms spending to counter the Nazi threat. In 1939 she was awarded the OBE.
