= Terry Wogan =

Irish-British radio and television broadcaster (1938–2016)

Sir Terry Wogan KBE DL
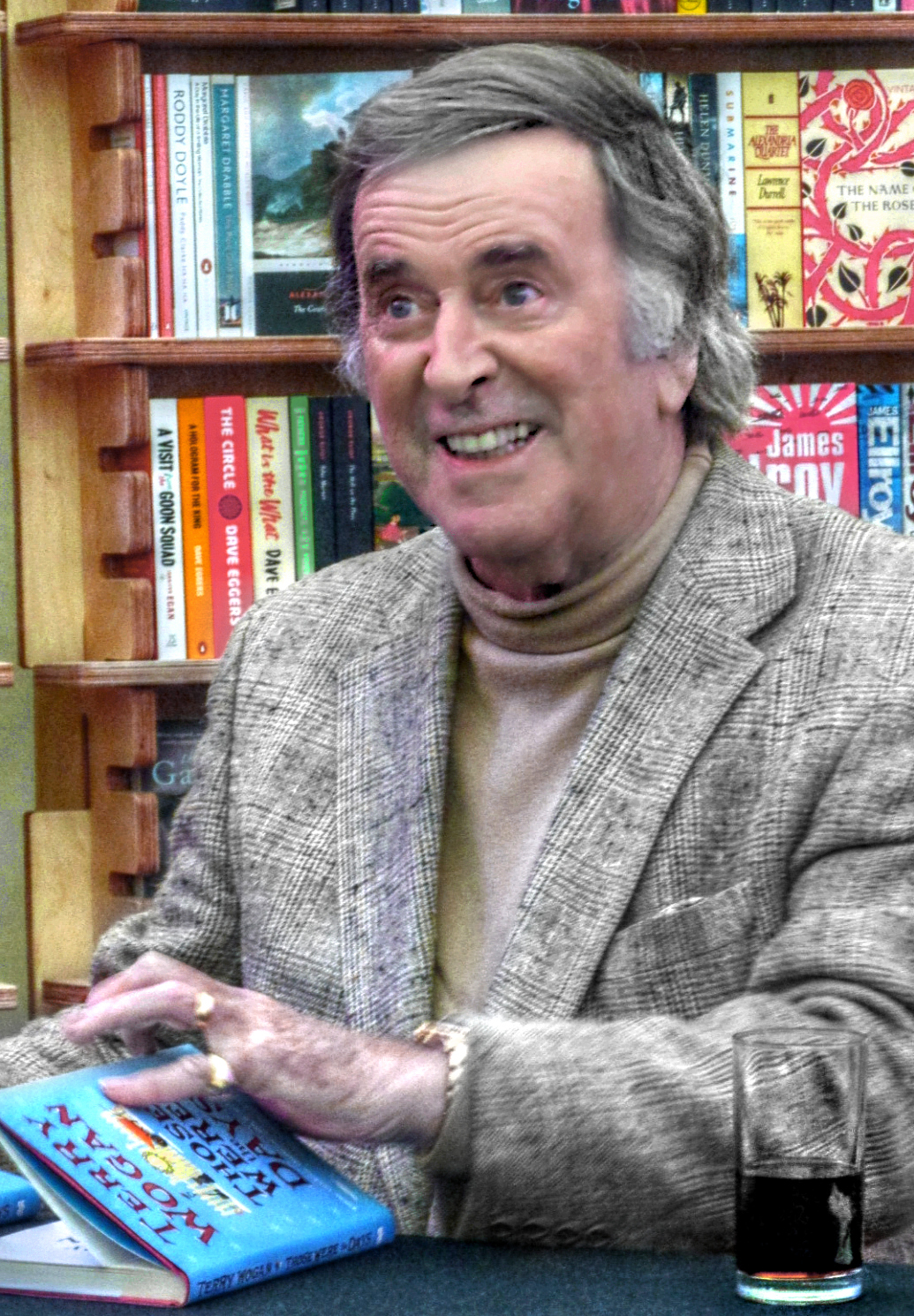
- Wogan at the Cheltenham Literature Festival in 2015
- Born: Michael Terence Wogan; 3 August 1938; Limerick, Ireland
- Died: 31 January 2016 (aged 77); Taplow, Buckinghamshire, England
- Citizenship: Ireland; United Kingdom (from 2005)
- Years active: 1956–2015
- Employer: BBC
- Known for: Television presenting: Jackpot (Telefis Eireann 1963–1965); Eurovision Song Contest (1971, 1973–1978, 1980–2008); Blankety Blank (1979–1983); Children in Need (1980–2014); Wogan (1982–1992); Auntie's Bloomers (1991–2001); Points of View (1999–2007); Wogan's Perfect Recall (2008–2010); Radio presenting: Radio 1 & 2 – weekdays, 3pm-5pm (1969–1972); The Radio 2 Breakfast Show (1972–1984); Wake Up to Wogan (1993–2009); Weekend Wogan (2010–2015)
- Spouse: Helen Joyce (m. 1965)
- Children: 4
- Terry Wogan's voice Recorded January 2012 from the BBC Radio 4 programme Desert Island Discs

Sir Michael Terence Wogan (/ˈwoʊɡən/; 3 August 1938 – 31 January 2016) was an Irish radio and television broadcaster who worked for the BBC in Britain for most of his career. Between 1993 and his semi-retirement in 2009, his BBC Radio 2 weekday breakfast programme Wake Up to Wogan regularly drew an estimated eight million listeners. He was believed to be the most listened-to radio broadcaster in Europe.

Wogan was a leading media personality in Ireland and Britain from the late 1960s and was often referred to as a "national treasure". In addition to his weekday radio show, he was known for his work on television, including the BBC1 chat show Wogan, presenting Children in Need, the game show Blankety Blank and Come Dancing. He was the BBC's commentator for the Eurovision Song Contest from 1971 to 2008 (radio: 1971, 1974–1977; television: 1973, 1978, 1980–2008) and the Contest's co-host in 1998. He also presented the BBC's blooper show, Auntie's Bloomers, between 1991 and 2001. In recognition of his television career, in 2006, the British public ranked him number 21 in ITV's poll of TV's 50 Greatest Stars.

In 2005, Wogan acquired British citizenship in addition to his Irish nationality and was awarded a knighthood in the same year and was therefore entitled to use the title "Sir". He presented Weekend Wogan, a two-hour Sunday morning show on Radio 2, from 2010 until his final show on Remembrance Sunday 2015 when his health was beginning to decline. He died on 31 January 2016, aged 77.

== Early life ==
Wogan was born on 3 August 1938 at Cleary's Nursing Home, Elm Park, Limerick, Ireland, the elder of two children. He was the son of the manager of Leverett & Frye, a high-class grocery store in Limerick, and was educated at Crescent College, a Jesuit school, from the age of eight. He experienced a strongly religious upbringing, later commenting that he had been brainwashed into believing by the threat of going to hell. Despite this, he often expressed his fondness for the city of his birth, commenting on one occasion that "Limerick never left me, whatever it is, my identity is Limerick."

At the age of 15, after his father was promoted to general manager, Wogan moved to Dublin with his family. While living there he attended Crescent College's sister school, Belvedere College. He participated in amateur dramatics and discovered a love of rock and roll. After leaving Belvedere in 1956, Wogan had a brief career in the banking profession, joining the Royal Bank of Ireland. In his early twenties, he joined the national broadcaster of Ireland, Raidió Teilifís Éireann (RTÉ), as a newsreader and announcer, after seeing a newspaper advertisement inviting applicants.

== Radio work ==
=== Early career ===
Wogan conducted interviews and presented documentary features during his first two years at Raidió Teilifís Éireann (RTÉ), before moving to the light entertainment department as a disc jockey and host of TV quiz and variety shows such as Jackpot, a top-rated quiz show on RTÉ in the 1960s. When the show was dropped by RTÉ TV in 1967, he approached the BBC for extra work. David Attenborough rebuffed his job application to be a BBC presenter; in 2016, after Wogan's death, Attenborough expressed the view that "to have had two Irishmen presenting on BBC2 would have looked ridiculous". The channel already had an Irish announcer. Wogan began working for BBC Radio, initially 'down the line' from Dublin, first broadcasting on the BBC Light Programme on 27 September 1966. His earliest BBC radio show surviving in the BBC Archives is from 24 December 1966, when he presented Songs for Christmas on the BBC Light Programme. He presented the Tuesday edition of Late Night Extra for two years on BBC Radio 1 and BBC Radio 2, commuting weekly from Dublin to London. After being a stand-in presenter on Jimmy Young's mid-morning show while Young took a holiday throughout July 1969, Wogan was offered a weekday afternoon slot which began on 29 September that year, initially on BBC Radio 1, but from early 1970, was also simultaneously broadcast on BBC Radio 2.

In April 1972 he took over the breakfast show on BBC Radio 2, swapping places with John Dunn, who moved to the afternoon show. Wogan achieved record estimated audiences of up to 7.9 million. His first chat show, Wogan's World, was broadcast on BBC Radio 4 from 6 June 1974 to 21 September 1975. His seemingly ubiquitous presence across the media meant that he frequently became the butt of jokes by comedians of the time, among them The Goodies and The Barron Knights. He released a parody vocal version of the song "The Floral Dance" in 1978, by popular request from listeners who enjoyed hearing him sing over the instrumental hit by the Brighouse and Rastrick Brass Band. His version reached number 21 in the UK Singles Chart.

In December 1984, Wogan left his breakfast show to pursue a full-time career in television and was replaced by Ken Bruce.

=== Return to radio ===
Although he had left full time radio, by the start of 1985. Wogan did continue to associate himself with radio programmes, hosting special shows during Christmas and Bank Holidays for both Radio 2 and Radio 4 between his departure from Breakfast and eventual return in January 1993. Additionally Wogan was also one of the main investors in the short lived Irish national radio station Century Radio, where he hosted for a few months a Saturday morning programme. In the summer of 1992, Wogan joined the team at Radio 5 where for two weeks he hosted a daily afternoon show from Barcelona, as part of the networks coverage of the Summer Olympics.

In January 1993 he returned to Radio 2, replacing Brian Hayes to present the breakfast show, which took the new name Wake Up to Wogan; it began with a preview show in the mid-morning of Boxing Day 1992. Wogan's tendency to go off on rambling, esoteric tangents, often including banter with his then producer Paul Walters, became popular with both younger and older listeners. Much of the entertainment came from letters and emails sent in by listeners, many of whom adopted punning pseudonyms. One occasion involved Wogan reading out an email from someone using the name "Tess Tickles", without realising what the name was referring to, prompting Paul Walters' standard reply in such situations – "I only print 'em!"

Through his show Wogan was also widely credited with launching the career of singer Katie Melua, after he repeatedly played her début single, "The Closest Thing to Crazy", in late 2003. When she performed on Children in Need in 2005, Wogan joked that Melua owed her career to him. He gave credit for her discovery to Walters. Walters also put music by Eva Cassidy, an American singer who had died in relative obscurity, on Wogan's playlist; Cassidy then, posthumously, became a sensation in the United Kingdom.

As his radio show was considered to attract older listeners, Wogan jokingly referred to his fans as "TOGs", standing for "Terry's Old Geezers" or "Terry's Old Gals", while "TYGs" were "Terry's Young Geezers/Gals", who he joked were forced to listen to him because of their parents' choice of radio station. Wogan was referred to as "The Togmeister" on his own programme by himself and members of his production team, and he referred to the podcast of his show as a "Togcast".

There were also running jokes involving Wogan's newsreader colleagues Alan Dedicoat (nicknamed "Deadly" after the spoonerism "Deadly Alancoat"), Fran Godfrey (nicknamed "Frank"), and John Marsh (nicknamed "Boggy"). Marsh once told Wogan on air that his wife was called Janet, and a series of "Janet and John" stories followed, read by Wogan during the breakfast show. These were a pastiche of children's learn-to-read stories, with humorous sexual double entendres, which often led to Wogan and Marsh breaking into laughter. Six CDs and two books of the stories have been sold in aid of Children in Need, raising over £4 million. A long-running campaign by Wogan criticising the British government for levying VAT on the CDs eventually led to a government rebate of £200,000. Another feature of the programme was Wogan's exchanges with "the Totty from Splotty" – Lynn Bowles, the Welsh traffic reporter from Splott, Cardiff – which often involved reading limericks from listeners cut short after one or two lines, as risqué innuendo in the later lines was telegraphed.

Wake Up to Wogan attracted an estimated audience of eight million in 2005. That figure was surpassed in 2008, as Wogan's show held off a challenge from Radio 1 for listeners during the breakfast slot. According to figures leaked to British newspapers in April 2006, Wogan was the highest-paid BBC radio presenter at that time, with an £800,000-a-year salary. In an interview with Britain's Hello! magazine in its 30 May 2006 issue, Wogan confirmed this, saying that he represented "good value". On 23 May 2005, he crossed BBC strike picket lines to present his show.

Wogan was forced off the air on 16 February 2007, when steam from a nearby gym set off fire alarms. For 15 minutes, an emergency tape played continuous music. On returning, Wogan read out several light-hearted comments from listeners, saying that they thought he had died with his sudden disappearance and the playing of such sentimental music. On 7 September 2009, Wogan confirmed to his listeners that he would be leaving the breakfast show at the end of the year, with Chris Evans taking over. The Times published an ode to Wogan: "Stop all the clocks, cut off the telephone. Terry Wogan is abandoning his microphone", and novelist Allison Pearson commented: "Heard the one about the Irishman who reminded the British of what they could be at their best? His name was Terry Wogan." Wogan presented his final Radio 2 breakfast show on 18 December 2009.

It was announced that Wogan would return to Radio 2, beginning on 14 February 2010, to host a live weekly two-hour Sunday show on the network, featuring live musical performance and guests, between 11.00 am and 1.00 pm. The show, titled Weekend Wogan, was hosted in front of a live audience in the Radio Theatre at Broadcasting House until the fourth series, where he returned to the studio.

Wogan continued to host the show until his final broadcast on Remembrance Sunday 2015, due to his declining health with cancer. It then continued with guest hosts until the end of that month, after which, regular cover show Madeley on Sunday presented by Richard Madeley filled the slot temporarily. Michael Ball then permanently took over the slot in April 2016.

== Television work ==
=== Eurovision Song Contest ===
In 1971, and from 1974 until 1977, Wogan provided the BBC's radio commentary for the Eurovision Song Contest. He became known for his television commentary, which he handled first in 1973, again in 1978, and then every year from 1980 until 2008. He co-hosted the 1998 contest with Ulrika Jonsson, in Birmingham's National Indoor Arena on 9 May. Wogan was the third person in the contest's history to combine the roles of presenter and commentator. When not on stage, he was in his private booth providing commentary to BBC viewers. From 1977 until 1996, Wogan hosted the UK selection show each year, returning to the role in 1998, and again from 2003 until 2008. In 1973, 1975, every year from 1977 until 1984, and again in 1994, Wogan also presented the UK Eurovision Song Contest Previews on BBC1.

Wogan's often "deadpan" commentating style, which often involved humour at the expense of others, caused controversy; for example, when he referred to the hosts of the 2001 contest in Denmark, Søren Pilmark and Natasja Crone Back, as "Doctor Death and the Tooth Fairy".

During the presentation of the Dutch points in the Eurovision Song Contest 2006, Wogan called the Dutch televote presenter, Paul de Leeuw, an "eejit", as de Leeuw started to make ad lib comments, gave his mobile phone number, and generally hogged the limelight for some time before giving the Dutch votes. Chris Tarrant later praised Wogan's acerbity.

During the 2007 BBC show Making Your Mind Up, in which the British public voted to decide their Eurovision entry, Wogan incorrectly announced that the runner-up Cyndi was the winner. The winner was the group Scooch; according to the BBC, Wogan was provided with the correct result during the live show.

In the 2008 contest, the UK's entry, Andy Abraham, finished in last place, much to Wogan's disappointment. Wogan argued that Abraham gave a better performance than the entries from Spain and Bosnia and Herzegovina. Right before the Russian winning entry's reprise, he said "… and possibly goodbye, Europe."

On 11 August 2008, Wogan said in an interview with the Radio Times magazine that he was doubtful about commentating the Eurovision Song Contest for the UK again. On 5 December 2008, Wogan stepped down from the role after 35 years. Graham Norton succeeded Wogan as the UK commentator from the 2009 contest onwards.

In November 2014, Wogan reviewed Norton's autobiography for The Irish Times. Describing his attitude towards the contest, he wrote that he saw it as a "sometimes foolish farce", while implying that the winner of the 2014 contest, Austrian drag performer Conchita Wurst, was a "freakshow". Following his death, his commentary of the contest has been retrospectively criticised for its mocking tone.

=== Chat shows ===
Wogan's first foray into TV interviewing, and indeed to British television, was in 1972 on Lunchtime with Wogan on ITV. Later, What's On, Wogan? ran for one series in 1980 on BBC1, primarily on early Saturday evenings. In 1981 he had a chance to host a one-off chat show, Saturday Live. Among his guests on this show were Larry Hagman, promoting the film S.O.B., and Frank Hall. Hagman was at the height of his fame, which gave the show a high profile.

Soon after Wogan was given his own chat show, Wogan, which after a trial run on a midweek evening, was recommissioned for broadcast on Saturday nights from 1982 to 1984. Between 1985 and 1992, the show aired on Mondays, Wednesdays and Fridays at 7 pm. The series included interviews with George Best, Chevy Chase, Anne Bancroft, Ronnie Barker announcing his retirement on the show, and David Icke claiming to be the "Son of God", to whom Wogan stated: "They're not laughing with you, they're laughing at you."

The BBC stopped an interview in 1989 with Simon Hayward, a former captain in the Life Guards, hours before he was due to appear on the Wogan show. Hayward insisted that he was innocent of drug smuggling offences. The decision was taken by the Controller of BBC1, Jonathan Powell, after protests from several MPs. The BBC was accused of censorship, and a Conservative MP, John Gorst, described the decision to ban Hayward from Wogan as "outrageous".

Wogan was released from his talk show contract in 1992, after pressure from the BBC. He said that the BBC also wanted his scheduling slot for the ill-fated soap Eldorado. After Eldorado took over the 7 pm slot, Wogan briefly hosted a new weekly chat strand Terry Wogan's Friday Night in 1993, but this series was not recommissioned.

Wogan presented Wogan Now and Then (2006), a show in which he interviewed guests from his former chat show, as well as new guests. BBC Two launched a new compilation series, Wogan: the Best Of in 2015, featuring selected interview segments and music performances from Wogan's past chat series, linked by new introductions from Wogan.

=== Children in Need ===
In 1980, the BBC's charity appeal for children was first broadcast as a telethon called Children in Need, with Wogan presenting alongside Sue Lawley and Esther Rantzen. He campaigned extensively for the charity, and often involved himself via auctions on his radio show, or more directly by taking part in well-publicised sponsored activities.

He was reported to be the only celebrity paid for his participation in Children in Need, having received a fee every year since 1980 (£9,065 in 2005). Wogan stated that he would "quite happily do it for nothing" and that he "never asked for a fee". Wogan donated his BBC fees to the charity. The BBC stated that the fee had "never been negotiated" and was paid from BBC resources rather than the Children in Need fund.

He appeared on the panel comedy show QI in the 2008 episode for Children in Need, 'Families'.

In 2008, Wogan and singer Aled Jones released a single "Little Drummer Boy"/"Peace on Earth", which got to number three in the UK music charts. The money raised went to BBC Children in Need. The two recorded a second Christmas single "Silver Bells" in 2009, which was also in aid of BBC Children in Need.

Wogan was the main regular presenter of Children in Need between 1980 and 2014. In November 2015, he was unable to participate in the live televised Children in Need appeal for the first time in its 35-year history due to poor health following a surgical procedure on his back. He did, however, make a brief appearance as part of a pre-recorded sketch. He was replaced by Dermot O'Leary.

=== Other television work ===
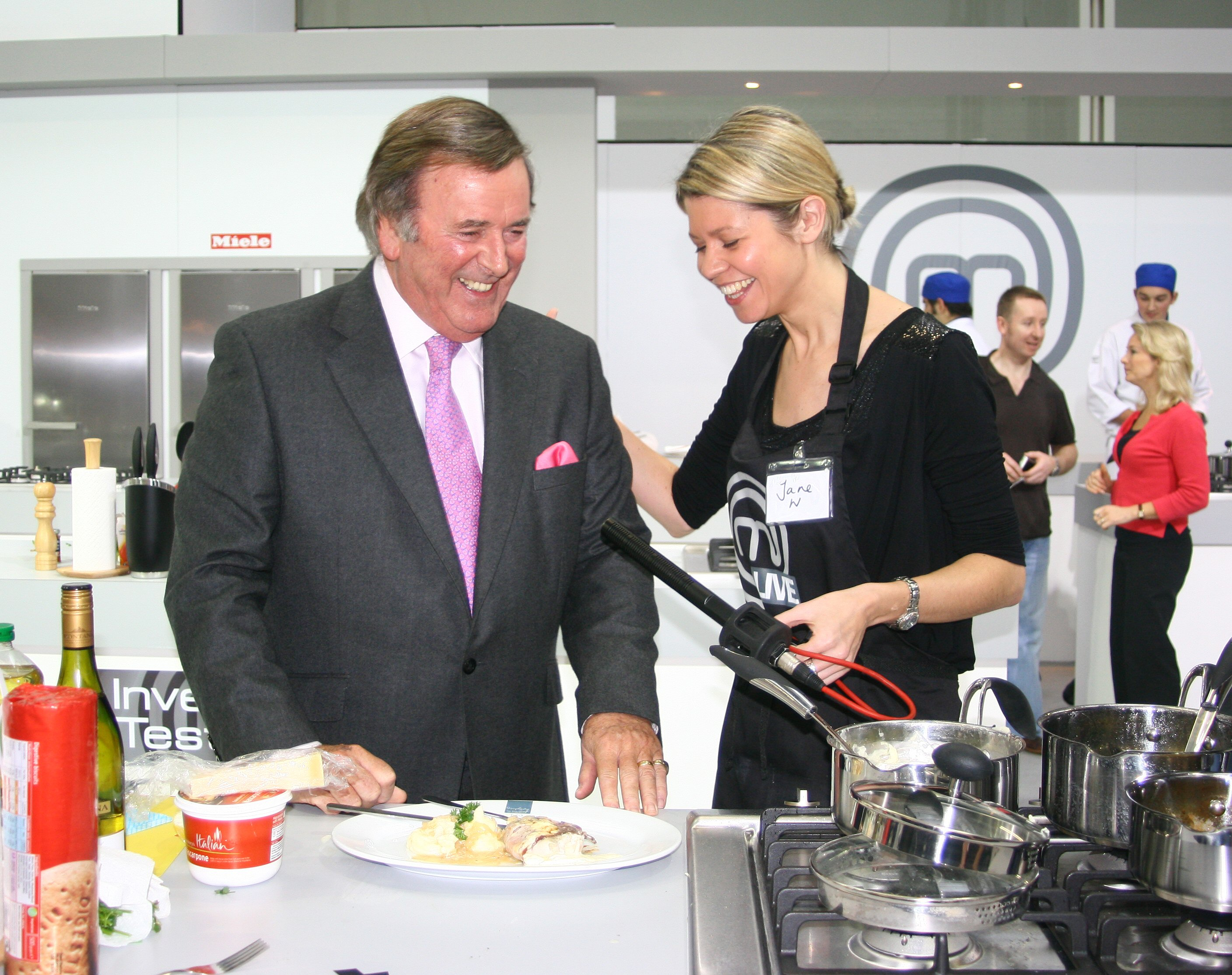
Wogan on MasterChef Live in November 2009

Wogan's television profile was boosted considerably when he became the first-ever host of Blankety Blank, the British adaptation of Match Game, in 1979. His good-humoured interaction with the contestants and lively banter with the celebrity guests went a long way to making the show a success. Among the guests who appeared most frequently during this period were Roy Hudd, Beryl Reid, Lorraine Chase and Kenny Everett. Wogan left the show after the 1983 series, just over a year before his thrice-weekly chat show commenced.

Wogan narrated the BBC television series Stoppit and Tidyup, which was broadcast in 1987.

Wogan appeared on Friday Night with Jonathan Ross four times, between 2004 and 2009. In an appearance on the BBC programme Top Gear, Wogan became the second-slowest guest to go around the test track as the "Star in a Reasonably-Priced Car", a Suzuki Liana. Only Richard Whiteley was slower.

In 2010, Wogan made a cameo appearance in the second series of Being Human, and also guest-hosted the fourth episode of the 24th series of Never Mind the Buzzcocks. The following year, Wogan hosted Wogan on Wodehouse for BBC Two. In 2011 he appeared as a panellist on Would I Lie To You.

On 21 September 2013, Wogan appeared as a panellist on ITV game show Through the Keyhole. In November 2013, he participated in a celebrity edition of the BBC One game show Pointless, with celebrities including Bobby Ball and Esther Rantzen, in aid of Children in Need.

On 31 March 2014, Wogan was a guest reporter on Bang Goes the Theory, on which he discussed old-age dementia. From 12 to 16 May 2014, Wogan appeared on the Channel 4 game show Draw It!. On 10 November 2014, in the run-up to that year's Children in Need telethon, Wogan guest hosted an episode of The One Show with Alex Jones. He also presented a series called Terry and Mason's Great Food Trip with the cab driver Mason McQueen in 2015, in which the duo travelled across Britain eating regional food.

== Honours and awards ==
Wogan was appointed an Honorary Officer of the Order of the British Empire (OBE) in 1997, and later became an Honorary Knight Commander of the same order (KBE) in the 2005 Queen's Birthday Honours List. After asserting his right to British citizenship and retaining his Irish citizenship that year, Wogan was officially knighted on 11 October 2005, allowing him to be called "Sir Terry". On 29 May 2007, he was appointed a Deputy Lieutenant of Buckinghamshire.

On 15 June 2007, Wogan's home city of Limerick honoured him with the Freedom of the City at a ceremony in Limerick's Civic Hall. Because of his long absence from the city and unflattering remarks about the city in a 1980 interview, the local press carried out a vox pop, which resulted in support for the award. He was made an Honorary Freeman of the City of London in 2009, and invited to raise the bascules of Tower Bridge.

In 2004, he received an Honorary D.Litt. degree from the University of Limerick, as well as a special lifetime achievement award from his native city. He received an Honorary LL.D. degree from Leicester University in 2010.

In 1978, Wogan was the subject of This Is Your Life, when he was surprised by Eamonn Andrews at Broadcasting House.

Wogan was inducted into the Radio Academy Hall of Fame at a gala dinner held in his honour on 10 December 2009. Wogan was announced as the Ultimate Icon of Radio 2, commemorating the station's 40th birthday. The shortlist of sixteen candidates had been published on the BBC Radio 2 website, and the winner was announced live on Radio 2 during a one-off special edition of Family Favourites by host Michael Aspel on 30 September 2007. He praised his fellow nominees, the Beatles, Diana, Princess of Wales, and Nelson Mandela during his acceptance speech, which was broadcast live on BBC Radio 2, and he chose Nat King Cole's recording of "Stardust" as his iconic song of the last 40 years. Wogan had chosen the song twice before as his favourite record on Desert Island Discs, and said he wanted to be buried with it.

== Personal life ==
Wogan married Helen Joyce (1936–2024) on 24 April 1965 in her parish church, Our Lady of Refuge, Rathmines, and they remained married until his death in 2016. They lived in Taplow, Buckinghamshire, with another home in Gascony, southwest France. They had four children (one of whom, a daughter Vanessa, died when only a few weeks old) and five grandchildren. In 2010, Wogan described the anguish he felt on the loss of his baby daughter.

In April 2013, Wogan attended the funeral of former British Prime Minister Margaret Thatcher after being invited by her family.

Wogan was brought up and educated as a Roman Catholic, but became an atheist at the age of 17. In an interview with Gay Byrne on RTÉ, he said that he respected those who had "the gift of faith".

== Death ==
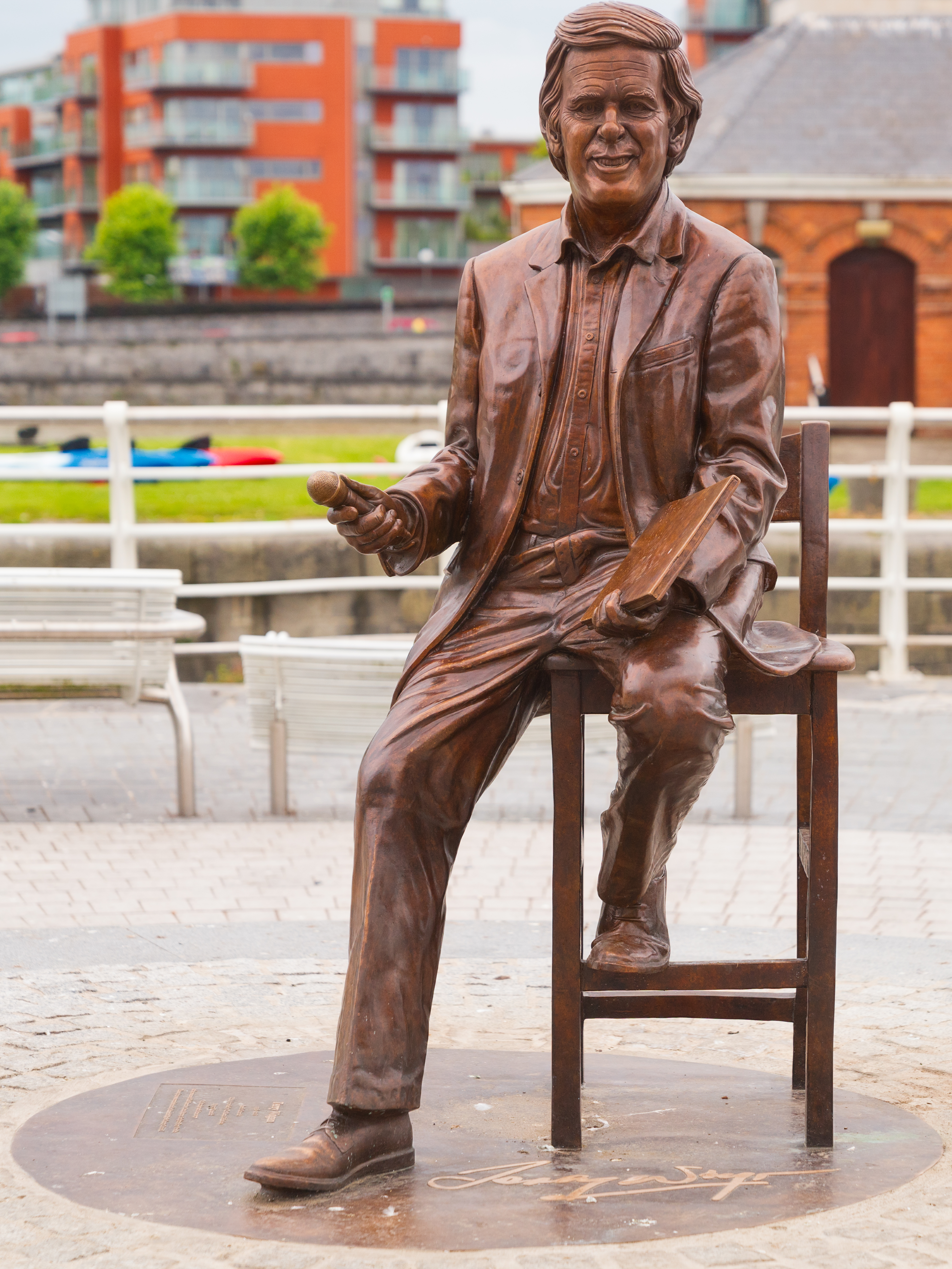
Memorial statue in Limerick, Ireland

Wogan's last broadcast was on 8 November 2015 on his BBC radio show Weekend Wogan. By then he had been diagnosed with the advanced stages of prostate cancer and he died on 31 January 2016 at his home in Taplow. His funeral was private but a memorial service was held at Westminster Abbey on 27 September 2016.

British Prime Minister David Cameron said that "Britain has lost a huge talent", and Michael D. Higgins, the President of Ireland, praised Wogan's career and his frequent visits to his homeland. Taoiseach Enda Kenny and Tánaiste Joan Burton remembered Wogan for his role in helping Anglo-Irish relations during the Troubles. The BBC renamed BBC Western House, home of Radio 2, in his memory, to BBC Wogan House. Although the BBC has now vacated the building, the name has been retained.

== Filmography ==
=== Television ===
Year	Title	Role	Note(s)
1963–1965	Jackpot	Presenter	Wogan's first television work.
1972–1973	Lunchtime with Wogan	Presenter	
1973–1979	Come Dancing	Presenter	
1973, 1978, 1980–2008	Eurovision Song Contest	Presenter	UK television commentary (excluding the semi-finals, 2004–2008)
1973, 1975, 1977–1984, 1994	Eurovision Song Contest Previews	Presenter	
1974	Castlebar Song Contest	Presenter	
1975	Disco	Quiz Chairman	BBC1 Sunday afternoon pop music quiz with team captain's Tim Rice and Roger Scott
1977–1995, 2003	A Song for Europe	Presenter	
1977	Ask a Silly Answer	Presenter	For Southern Television, 14 April – 19 May 1977; Six episodes. Panel includes Graeme Garden, Alfred Marks, Willie Rushton, and Spike Milligan.
1979–1983	Blankety Blank	Presenter	95 episodes
1980–2014, 2015	Children in Need	Main presenter	Telethon presenter, with various co-presenters until 2014. With a short voiceover and a small appearance in 2015.
1981	You Must Be Joking!	Presenter	Gameshow, where two contrasting teams of 25 are pitted against each other; 10 episodes
1982–1992	Wogan	Presenter	British television chat show
1982	Wogan's Guide to the BBC	Presenter	Behind the scenes at the BBC.
1988	Stoppit and Tidyup	Narrator	
1991–2001	Auntie's Bloomers	Presenter	
1994–1995	Do the Right Thing	Presenter	Gameshow with interactive fiction
1996, 1998	The Great British Song Contest	Presenter	
1997, 2013	Room 101	Guest	
1998	Eurovision Song Contest 1998	Presenter	With Ulrika Jonsson
1998	Wogans Web	Presenter	11 May to 3 June 1998, with his Radio 2 producer Paul Walters.
1999–2008	Points of View	Presenter	
2003–2004	The Terry and Gaby Show	Presenter	With Gaby Roslin
2004–2007	Eurovision: Making Your Mind Up	Presenter	With various co-presenters
2006	Wogan Now and Then	Presenter	British television chat show, 11 episodes
2006	Blankety Blank DVD Game	Presenter	Returned to Blankety Blank for a special DVD edition
2008	Eurovision: Your Decision	Presenter	With Claudia Winkleman
2008	QI	Panellist	Series F Episode 1 "Families" – Children in Need special
2008–2010	Wogan's Perfect Recall	Presenter	
2014	Secrets of the Body Clock		
2014	The One Show	Guest presenter	1 episode
2015	Terry and Mason's Great Food Trip	Presenter	Documentary series, Wogan's final Television Work

=== Radio ===
Year	Title	Note(s)
1966	Midday Spin	Wogan's first radio work for the BBC. Broadcast on The Light Programme.
1967	Housewives Choice	Guest host for a week in April 1967.
1967–69	Late Night Extra	Broadcast on BBC Radio 1.
1969	The Jimmy Young Show	Stand-in while Young was on holiday in July 1969. Broadcast on Radio 1.
1969–72	Weekday afternoons	3-5pm, broadcast on BBC Radios 1 and 2.
1971, 1974–1977	Eurovision Song Contest	Presenter, radio coverage
1972–84	The Terry Wogan Show	First stint on The Radio 2 Breakfast Show.
1974–75	Wogan's World	Wogan's first chat show, broadcast on BBC Radio 4.
1993–2009	Wake Up To Wogan	Second stint on The Radio 2 Breakfast Show.
1997–2015	Proms in the Park	Host
2010–15	Weekend Wogan	Wogan's final radio work.

== Bibliography ==
=== Biography ===
- Is It Me? (BBC Books, 2000) ISBN 9781446416938
- Mustn't Grumble (Orion, 2006) ISBN 9781409105893

=== Fiction ===
- Those Were the Days (Pan Macmillan, 2015) ISBN 9781447298243

=== General non-fiction ===
- Fight the Flab: Keep Fit With Terry Wogan (BBC Books, 1971) ISBN 9780563119937
- Banjaxed (1979) ISBN 9781908461995
- The Day Job (1981) ISBN 9781909040342
- Wogan on Wogan (Penguin, 1987) ISBN 9780140108453
- Terry Wogan's Bumper Book of TOGs (Andrews UK, 2011) ISBN 9781908262776
- Where Was I?!: The World According to Wogan (Orion, 2009) ISBN 9781409111337
- Wogan's Twelve (Orion, 2007) ISBN 9780752888439
- Something for the Weekend: The Collected Columns of Sir Terry Wogan (Orion, 2013) ISBN 9781409148814
- The Little Book of Common Sense: Or Pause for Thought with Wogan (Orion, 2014) ISBN 9781409146568

=== Travel ===
- Irish Days (Penguin, 1991) ISBN 9780718134136
- Wogan's Ireland: A Tour Around the Country that Made the Man (Simon and Schuster, 2012) ISBN 9781471115004

== See also ==
- List of Eurovision Song Contest presenters
- List of honorary British knights and dames

Media offices
Preceded by John Dunn	BBC Radio 2 Breakfast Show Presenter; 1972–1984	Succeeded by Ken Bruce
Preceded by Tom Fleming	Eurovision Song Contest UK commentator 1973	Succeeded by David Vine
Preceded by Pete Murray	Eurovision Song Contest UK commentator 1978	Succeeded by John Dunn
Preceded by John Dunn	Eurovision Song Contest UK television commentator 1980–2008	Succeeded by Graham Norton
Preceded by Larry Gogan	Eurovision Song Contest Ireland commentator 1983	Succeeded by Gay Byrne
New programme	Host of Blankety Blank; 1979–1984	Succeeded by Les Dawson
Preceded by Brian Hayes	BBC Radio 2 Breakfast Show Presenter; 1993–2009	Succeeded by Chris Evans
Preceded by (Republic of Ireland) Carrie Crowley and Ronan Keating	Eurovision Song Contest presenter (with Ulrika Jonsson); 1998	Succeeded by (Israel) Yigal Ravid, Dafna Dekel, and Sigal Shachmon
