= Leonard Stein =

Leonard Stein may refer to:

- Leonard Stein (musicologist)
- Leonard Stein (politician)
