= Katharine Frye =

British actress, diarist and suffragist (1878–1959)

- Born: Katherine Collins; 9 January 1878; North Kensington, England
- Died: 16 February 1959 (aged 81); Beaconsfield, England
- Other name: Katherine Parry (stage name)
- Education: Ben Greet's Acting Academy
- Occupation: activist
- Employer: New Constitutional Society for Women's Suffrage
- Known for: diarist and suffragist

Katharine "Kate" Parry Frye (married Collins; 9 January 1878 – 16 February 1959) was a British actress, a lifelong diarist and suffragist.

== Life ==
Frye was born in North Kensington, England. Her father, Frederick Frye, was a businessperson and, in time, a member of parliament and her mother was Jane Kezia Frye (born Crosbie). Katherine was born above one of her father's Leverett & Frye grocer shops. By the time she was eight, she had started a diary which she would continue for the next seventy years.

In 1892 her father was elected to parliament, and he also became the sole owner of Leverett & Frye. Her father's achievements were recorded in the fourteen year old Katherine's diary. In 1902 she attended the Shakespearean actor Ben Greet's Acting Academy where she learnt about the stage. She had been trained by governesses which she later realised was an inadequate education. She obtained work in the play Quality Street by J.M.Barrie which was touring England and Ireland. She learnt how to fend for herself, how to speak to a crowd and that acting was a poorly paid profession. She did however meet John Robert Collins and they started a long engagement.

She joined the London Society for Women's Suffrage (now the Fawcett Society) and the Actresses' Franchise League. The latter supplied artwork and posters that supported the suffrage causes using volunteer artists. Frye continued her diary and lead a life of ease until 1911. In that year her family faced financial problems. In 1912 their home and all its contents were auctioned. Katharine's diary records the changes that became essential given her lack of money and she blamed her father for their misfortune. I

In 1911 she took a paid job with the New Constitutional Society for Women's Suffrage as an organiser. She toured south east England using her skills to find new recruits. Frye's diaries are particularly useful as she would attend the big suffrage events. She campaigned for George Lansbury when he resigned his seat in parliament in 1912 to create a bi-election. He wanted to confirm that the voters really did want women to have the vote. He lost by 700 votes. Frye's diary gave a report of the Emily Wilding Davison's funeral noting the matching outfits and the special pallbearers. Davison had given her life when she was trampled to death by a horse during a protest at the Derby.

In 1914 Frye was secretary of the New Constitutional Society for Women's Suffrage and with the outbreak of war the charity redirected their efforts to helping women rather than campaigning. By 1915 her fiance was no longer an actor but a soldier. Moreover, he was now a captain in the Royal Garrison Artillery and he could afford to have a wife. They married on 9 January.

In the 1930 Frye returned briefly to acting when she appeared in a walk on part under her stage name of Katherine Parry. Frye was continuing to write, but she only had one play published in 1920. Her writing was heard later during the second world war when their amateur productions in their garden theatre at Berghers Hill in Buckinghamshire raised funds for charity.

== Death and legacy ==
Frye died in Beaconsfield in 1959. Frye's diaries were discovered by a writer and book dealer, Elizabeth Crawford, who decided to edit rather than sell the diaries. She created a book from the part of Frye's diaries that cover the period of 1911 to 1915.

== Works ==
- Cease Fire! (a play), 1921
- Campaigning for the Vote: Kate Parry Frye's Suffrage Diary, 2012 - edited by Elizabeth Crawford
