= Wogan =

1982–1992 British television chat show

- 1985 opening titles
- Genre: Chat show
- Presented by: Terry Wogan
- Country of origin: United Kingdom
- Original language: English
- No. of series: 12
- No. of episodes: 1,131

Production
- Production locations: BBC Television Theatre (1982–91); BBC Television Centre (1991–92)
- Running time: 30–52 minutes

Original release
- Network: BBC One
- Release: 4 May 1982 – 3 July 1992

Related
- Terry Wogan's Friday Night (1992–93); Wogan Now and Then (2006); Wogan: the Best Of (2015)

Wogan was a British television talk show that was broadcast on BBC1 from 1982 to 1992 and presented by Terry Wogan. It was usually broadcast live from the BBC Television Theatre in Shepherd's Bush, London, until 1991. It was then broadcast from the BBC Television Centre (TVC). Some shows were pre-recorded and then broadcast unedited "as live". Wogan ended its run in July 1992 and was replaced in the schedule by the soap opera Eldorado.

== History ==
Wogan's first foray into TV interviewing, and indeed to British television, was in 1972 on Lunchtime with Wogan on ITV. In 1973, he left ITV and joined the BBC. In 1980, he was given another chat show; What's On, Wogan? running for 9 episodes in the spring of that year, primarily on Saturday evenings. In 1981, he had a chance to host a one-off chat show, Saturday Live. Among his guests on this show were Larry Hagman, promoting SOB, and Frank Hall. The show received a high profile with Hagman at the height of his fame starring as J. R. Ewing on Dallas. A year later, Wogan was given his own chat show, Wogan; initially broadcast on Tuesday evenings, the series was moved the following year to Saturday nights to replace Parkinson.

When BBC1 was relaunched on 18 February 1985, the show was moved to weekdays at 7:00pm, running three nights per week, on Mondays, Wednesdays and Fridays. Michael Grade, controller of BBC1 at the time, said: "When I took over BBC1, I discovered there were wonderful things; it was just a case of where to put them." Grade also said: "The series would bring a much needed element of surprise and unpredictability to BBC Television."

=== Cancellation ===
By December 1991, Wogan had lost 4 million viewers, and the show was axed. During this time, BBC Scotland often moved the Friday edition to a late night slot. The final edition was broadcast on 3 July 1992, and replaced with the ill-fated soap Eldorado.

Wogan briefly hosted a new weekly late night chat show, Terry Wogan's Friday Night, which started on 2 October 1992. However the new series was not a success and was cancelled after 20 episodes, ultimately leading to Wogan returning to radio in his Radio 2 breakfast slot. The series ended on 5 March 1993.

In 1996, Wogan criticised the BBC over its handling of the show since the BBC had refused his wish to give up the series in 1991, instead carrying on for a further year. Wogan said: "I felt peeved by the insensitivity – no, incompetence of how it was handled."

In March 2015, BBC Two launched a new compilation series, Wogan: the Best Of, featuring selected interview segments and music performances from Wogan's past chat series, linked by new introductions.

=== Wogan Now and Then ===
Wogan presented Wogan Now and Then in 2006, for UKTV Gold and produced by Spun Gold Television. Wogan spoke again with former guests from original series along with new guests. Thirteen hour-long episodes were made.

== Series ==
Series	Start date	End date	Episodes
1	4 May 1982	22 June 1982	8
2	15 January 1983	16 April 1983	13
3	14 January 1984	7 April 1984	13
4	22 September 1984	25 December 1984	13
5	18 February 1985	27 December 1985	137
6	3 January 1986	31 December 1986	150
7	2 January 1987	30 December 1987	150
8	1 January 1988	30 December 1988	150
9	4 January 1989	29 December 1989	150
10	3 January 1990	24 December 1990	150
11	2 January 1991	27 December 1991	150
12	6 January 1992	3 July 1992	78

== Guest hosts ==
Over the course of the show's run, when Wogan himself was unavailable to host the show, guest presenters were brought in, with Selina Scott being the first stand-in in 1985. Others include David Frost (1986), Ronnie Corbett (1986), Kenneth Williams (1986), Ben Elton (1989), Joanna Lumley (1989), Selina Scott (1991), Jonathan Ross (1990), Gloria Hunniford (1991), Felicity Kendal, Esther Rantzen and Bruce Forsyth. Sue Lawley (1988) became the most frequent replacement for the host and indeed for some time was Wogan's "official" stand in. When Lawley gained her own late night chat show, Saturday Matters with Sue Lawley on BBC1 in 1989, other celebrities again took it in turns to stand in for Wogan.

== Notable interviews ==
A number of interviews on the show are well-remembered, and have featured on compilation clip shows. Some examples include:

- Anne Bancroft was told that the show was being broadcast live only right before her interview, which made her extremely uncomfortable. As she was announced, she stopped and counted to ten before proceeding to walk down the steps onto the stage and then restricted many of her answers to monosyllabic replies.
- Ronnie Barker, when interviewed in 1988, publicly announced his retirement from show business.
- George Best appeared on the show while drunk and used profane language.
- Cilla Black appeared as a guest in 1983. By this point, her career had been largely reduced to performing cabaret in clubs. According to Christopher Biggins in his autobiography, Black "stormed back into the public consciousness with a barnstorming performance as a guest on Wogan in 1983, proving that we can all have second chances". After her appearance, people were "desperately trying to find her the right comeback vehicle".
- David Bowie refused to co-operate during an impromptu interview following a performance by his band Tin Machine. As Wogan put it: "David Bowie, well, he probably wasn't at his best when I interviewed him. But I thought a solid slap would have helped the situation. I didn't hit him, of course, but it came close. For some reason best known to him, he came on the show unwilling to talk."
- Nicolas Cage, who has a long history of substance abuse, appeared on the show in 1990 doing somersaults and karate kicks as he came onto the stage, and then took his T-shirt off during the interview and gave it to Wogan as a gift.
- Chevy Chase remained silent through his interview.
- Margi Clarke appeared on the show in the late 1980s wearing a scarf with the slogan "Media Sickness – More Contagious Than Aids" (coined by her then-partner, Jamie Reid). During the interview, Clarke asked Wogan what he thought of "media sickness". This was a ploy on Clarke's part to get Wogan to say the phrase. As Clarke intended, Wogan responded "Media Sickness?" An off-air recording of Wogan speaking the words "media sickness" was duly sampled by Clarke and Reid and used as a dance record.
- Jackie Collins and Barbara Cartland appeared as joint guests in 1987, when 86-year-old Cartland proceeded to slam Collins' novels for their racy content. Actor Ed Asner was also a guest and sat silently watching from the end of the couch as Collins and Cartland verbally sparred.
- Joan Collins was often announced as a potential guest, but always seemed to cancel at short notice, giving rise to media speculation that she was avoiding appearing on the show. When a special Christmas Day edition of the show featuring the cast of Dynasty was broadcast in 1985, Collins again refused to appear, though she did appear on the rival Des O'Connor Tonight show, which was broadcast by ITV at the same time that evening. Eventually, in 1988, she appeared on Wogan in a special programme dedicated to her. However, a subsequent appearance to promote one of her novels led to an extremely irritated exchange with the host.
- Fanny Cradock made her last BBC TV appearance on the show in 1986 and jovially told Wogan that his questioning was "very rude" and "very English".
- Patti Davis, daughter of Ronald Reagan, got into a heated argument with Wogan when he continually interrupted her and refused to allow her to make a point. She told him later in the interview that she was extremely angry at his behaviour.
- Gwen Ffrangcon-Davies, in her late nineties, reciting Juliet's death scene from Romeo and Juliet, a role she had first performed more than eighty years before.
- Simon Hayward, a former captain in the British Army's Life Guards regiment, was due to appear on the show in 1989. In 1987, Hayward had been convicted of drug smuggling offences in Sweden, and sentenced to five years' imprisonment. He was released in 1989 after serving half of that time, and was scheduled as a guest on the show to discuss the matter (for which he had always denied any guilt), but his appearance was cancelled just hours before by the then Controller of BBC1, Jonathan Powell, after protests from several British MPs. However, the BBC was accused of censorship and a Conservative MP, John Gorst, described the decision to ban Hayward from Wogan as "outrageous".
- Rock Hudson appeared on the show in 1984 in one of his last public interviews, as he died of AIDS-related complications the following year.
- David Icke appeared on the show in a turquoise tracksuit claiming to be "a son of the Godhead". When the studio audience began to laugh hysterically, Wogan responded: "They're not laughing with you; they're laughing at you." However, in the 2000s, when Wogan interviewed Icke again on television, he said that he regretted his stance on the interview and offered Icke an apology.
- Madonna appeared in a special show, Wogan Meets Madonna, in 1991, on which Wogan interviewed her in Cannes. She had requested that the interview was filmed in black and white but was refused. The interview was watched by 6.81 million people.
- Victoria Principal gave a feisty interview in 1984 and was herself crying with laughter at Wogan's mocking of her series Dallas. The two became friends and Principal made further appearances on the show via satellite.
- Vivienne Westwood appearing on the show in 1988 when it was being guest-hosted by Sue Lawley, and displaying her latest medically-inspired collection. When the audience began to laugh at the outlandish designs, an offended Westwood told Lawley that if they didn't stop laughing, she would tell the models to stop coming out. This interview would later be parodied in the fictional Knowing Me Knowing You with Alan Partridge. Russell Harty was one of the other guests present in one of his final TV appearances.
- Raquel Welch appeared on the Saturday night series to promote her exercise video, but was angered when she was told that the producers would not show a clip from the video as part of the interview and was quite hostile to Wogan's questioning as a result. At one point, she feigned to forget his name and asked him who he was, which clearly irritated the host.
