= Sir James Duncan, 1st Baronet =

British politician (1899–1974)

Captain Sir James Alexander Lawson Duncan, 1st Baronet (1899 – 30 September 1974) was a British Conservative and National Liberal politician.

Born in Danville, Sir James served as Member of Parliament (MP) for the Conservative Party in Kensington North from 1931 to 1945 when he was defeated in the Labour landslide of 1945. He was returned to Parliament as a National Liberal as the first Member of Parliament for the newly created South Angus constituency in 1950, and served until his retirement in 1964. He later became the parliamentary chairman of the National Liberals between 1956 and 1959.

He was married to Adrienne St. Quinton. After the death of his first wife Sir James remarried in 1966 to Beatrice Mary Moore Oliphant (1910–2003), widow of Philip Blair Oliphant.

Duncan was created a baronet on 24 July 1957, of Jordanstone in the County of Perth; the title became extinct on his death.

Party political offices
Preceded by John Maclay	Chairman of the National Liberal Party; 1956–1959	Succeeded by James Henderson-Stewart
Parliament of the United Kingdom
Preceded by Fielding Reginald West	Member of Parliament for Kensington North; 1931–1945	Succeeded by George Rogers
New constituency	Member of Parliament for South Angus; 1950–1964	Succeeded by Jock Bruce-Gardyne
Baronetage of the United Kingdom
New creation	Baronet (of Jordanstone); 1957–1974	Extinct
