= Jackpot (Irish TV series) =

- Presented by: Gay Byrne (1962-1963); Terry Wogan (1963-1965)
- Starring: Olive White (1962-1963); Suzanne MacDougald (1964-1965)
- Country of origin: Ireland
- Original language: English

Production
- Production locations: Studio 2, Television Centre, Donnybrook, Dublin 4, Ireland
- Running time: 30 minutes

Original release
- Network: Telefís Éireann
- Release: 6 January 1962 – 9 June 1965

Jackpot is an Irish general knowledge quiz show produced by Telefís Éireann between 6 January 1962 and 9 June 1965. Presented firstly by Gay Byrne and later by Terry Wogan, the show remained one of the most popular programmes in the first years of the television station. Jackpot was similar in format to the ITV quiz show Criss Cross Quiz.
