= 1889 London County Council election =

1889 English local government election

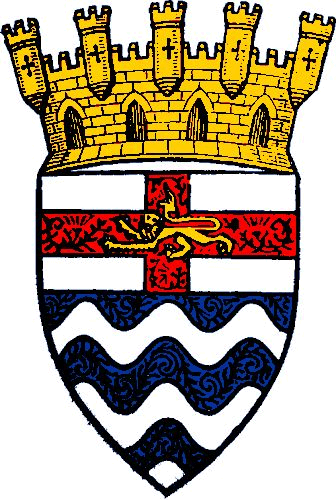
- 17 January 1889
	First party	Second party
Party	Progressive	Moderate
Seats won	72	46
Percentage	47.1%	36.4%

The first election to the County Council of London took place on 17 January 1889. The council was elected by First Past the Post with each elector having two votes in the two-member seats. Although the election was not contested on a party political basis, soon after the election, the majority of councillors formed the Progressive Party.

== Campaign ==
The council replaced the Metropolitan Board of Works, which was not a directly elected body. The London Municipal Reform League, a mixture of liberals and socialists, had long called for the establishment of an elected council for the city. Many of the candidates in the 1889 election were supporters of the league, while a second grouping were opponents of the league. This was a similar arrangement to that on the London School Board. Some candidates stood as independent of either grouping, many of whom were supported by local Conservative Party associations. In total, 32 candidates admitted to being sponsored by the Conservative Party or Liberal Party.

Some candidates proposed sweeping reforms, which fell outside the powers of the new council. Others, including Archibald Primrose, 5th Earl of Rosebery, argued that voters should elect the most competent candidates. The Times agreed with this assessment, but complained that many candidates were insufficiently well-known that voters could assess their competence. The paper also argued that "in no case can it be right to give support to a socialist".

== Results ==
Successful candidates: Progressives shown in yellow, Moderates in blue

The majority of successful candidates were supporters of the London Municipal Reform League, and after the election, they formed the Progressive Party. Their opponents did not form a political party, but did collaborate on the council as the Moderates, to the extent of having a whip. However, the groupings were initially not rigid, and many votes were conducted according to individual's consciences.

29 candidates had been members of the Metropolitan Board of Works, but only six of them won election.

It was not initially clear whether women were eligible to serve on the council. Two were elected; however, Margaret Mansfield, Baroness Sandhurst's election was overturned on petition from a losing candidate, Beresford Hope. Jane Cobden avoided participating in council business for the first year, in the hope that this would prevent her election from being challenged. In 1890, she began participating, and was then taken to court by Walter De Souza, and fined for acting while disqualified. She remained a council member, alongside the alderman Emma Cons, and attended meetings, but neither took any further part in votes.

On 5 February, 19 aldermen were elected, to also join the council. 18 of them were supported by the Progressive Party, and only 4 by the Moderates (three being on both party lists).

Party	Votes			Seats	
Party	Number	%	Stood	Seats	%
Progressive	118,700	47.1		71	60.17
Moderate	91,726	36.4		43	36.44
Independent and Other	40,079	15.9		4	3.39
Socialist	1,699	0.7		0	0.00
