= Wogan's Perfect Recall =

British game show

- Genre: Game show
- Directed by: Sue McMahon
- Presented by: Terry Wogan
- Theme music composer: Steve Isles
- Country of origin: United Kingdom
- Original language: English
- No. of series: 5
- No. of episodes: 150

Production
- Executive producer: Helen Municchi
- Production location: Pinewood Studios
- Running time: 30 minutes (inc. adverts)
- Production company: RDF Television

Original release
- Network: Channel 4
- Release: 25 August 2008 – 19 November 2010

Wogan's Perfect Recall is a game show presented by Terry Wogan. It was broadcast on Channel 4 and ran from 25 August 2008 to 19 November 2010.

== Format ==
Four contestants compete in each episode for a chance to win up to £100,000. The scores are reset to zero at the beginning of each round.

=== Round 1 ===
Twenty questions are asked on the buzzer, all worth one point each. If a contestant misses, any of the other three may buzz in and respond; however, if a second contestant also misses, the host reveals the correct answer. The lowest scorer at the end of this round is eliminated from the game.

Each correct answer is added to a video wall above the contestants' heads, placed so that they cannot see it. These answers are used for all questions in subsequent rounds.

=== Rounds 2 and 3 ===
Twenty new questions are asked in each round, following the same rules as Round 1. For the benefit of the studio audience and the home viewers, correct answers are removed from the video wall as they are used. The lowest scorer at the end of each round is eliminated.

=== Final ===
The last remaining contestant has a chance to win up to £100,000 by answering one last set of 20 questions in 60 seconds. They may pass a question and return to it later if time allows, but missed questions are taken out of play. Before the round begins, the contestant must decide how many questions they think they can answer, with a minimum of 11. If the contestant answers that many questions or more, they win only the prize money for the chosen level; if not, they leave with nothing but receive a consolation prize of a piggy bank.

The prize money levels are as follows.

# correct	Winnings
11	£1,000
12	£1,500
13	£2,000
14	£2,500
15	£3,000
16	£5,000
17	£10,000
18	£25,000
19	£50,000
20	£100,000

== Transmissions ==
Series	Start date	End date	Episodes
1	25 August 2008	19 September 2008	20
2	12 January 2009	20 February 2009	30
3	24 August 2009	18 September 2009	20
4	11 January 2010	12 February 2010	25
5	6 September 2010	19 November 2010	55
