= New Constitutional Society for Women's Suffrage =

Suffrage organisation in the UK

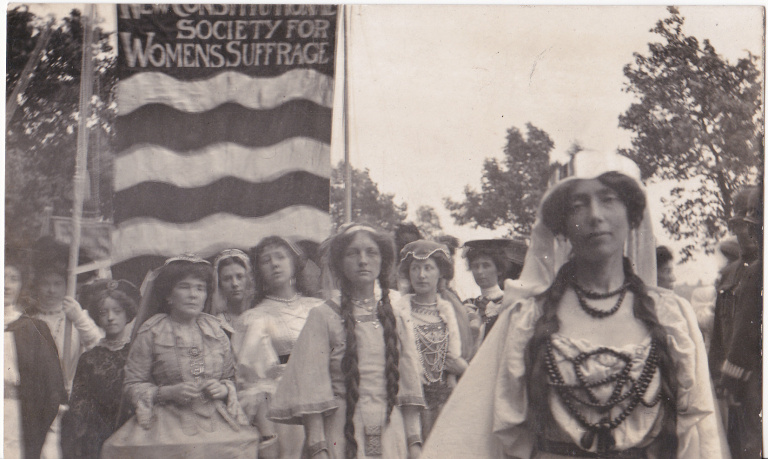
- The 1911 Coronation Procession showing the tail-end of the ‘Pageant of Queens’ and a banner. Photo by Christina Broom
- Formation: 1910
- Dissolved: 1918
- Type: Women-only political movement
- Purpose: Votes for women
- Headquarters: Whitechapel
- Methods: Demonstrations
- Key people: Adeline Chapman (president)

The New Constitutional Society for Women's Suffrage (NCS) was a British organisation that campaigned for women to be given the vote. It was formed in January 1910 following the election to lobby Liberal members of parliament. The organisation was not militant and it did not support (or decry) the actions of suffragettes. Its objective was "... to unite all suffragists who believe in the anti-Government election policy, who desire to work by constitutional means, and to abstain from public criticism of other suffragists whose conscience leads them to adopt different methods". The NCS dissolved in June 1918 following the passing Representation of the People Act 1918 which gave the right to vote to women aged over 30 for the first time.

== Notable members ==
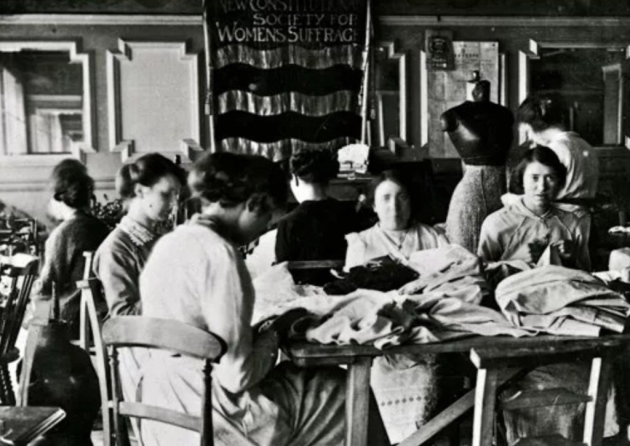
The "New Constitution Society for Women's Suffrage" office in Whitechapel

Adeline Chapman, an anti-suffragette, was one of the founding members of the NCS and served as its president and representative on national committees. Helen Ogston an activist, known for her anger, was an employee in 1910. She had been a leading suffragette the year before. Kate Frye was an organiser in East Anglia. She became the secretary of this organisation in 1914 In 1916 they employed Mary Phillips who was another ex-WSPU member (amongst others).

== Legacy ==
The organisation ended when some British women were first given the vote in 1918. None of the organisation's papers have survived, but the diary of the organisation's secretary Kate Frye was discovered and the relevant sections have been edited and published.
