= Leonard Caplan =

Leonard Caplan, QC (28 June 1909 – 18 January 2001) was a British barrister. He was described by an obituarist as "among the finest advocates of his generation".

== Life and legal career ==
Caplan was called to the Bar by Gray's Inn in 1935. He was made a Queen's Counsel in 1954, the youngest to take silk that year.

One of his most famous cases was Chaplin v Boys, in which he appeared for the successful respondent.

== Political career ==
A Conservative, Caplan unsuccessfully contested Pontypool in 1935, Hammersmith North in 1945, and Kensington North in 1950 and 1951.

== Arms ==
Coat of arms of Leonard Caplan

Notes
Displayed on a painted panel at Gray's Inn.
Crest
A demi griffin Or winged Gules and a demi dragon Gules winged Or combatant supporting a cannon barrel erect Proper.
Escutcheon
Argent between two barrulets wavy Blue Celeste and azure a salmon naiant Proper all between in chief two cups from a balance inverted Azure and in base a mullet of six points blue celeste.
Motto
Be Thou Blest
