= George Rogers (British politician) =

British politician

George Rogers CBE

Lord Commissioner of HM Treasury
- In office October 1964 – January 1966
- Prime Minister: Harold Wilson

Parliamentary Private Secretary to Minister of State for Foreign Affairs
- In office 1950–1950
- Prime Minister: Clement Attlee
- Minister: Kenneth Younger

Parliamentary Private Secretary to Minister of Supply
- In office 1947–1949
- Prime Minister: Clement Attlee
- Minister: George Strauss

Member of Parliament for Kensington North
- In office 5 July 1945 – 18 June 1970
- Preceded by: James Duncan
- Succeeded by: Bruce Douglas-Mann

Personal details
- Born: George Henry Roland Rogers; 9 December 1906
- Died: 19 February 1983 (aged 76)
- Party: Labour

George Henry Roland Rogers, CBE (9 December 1906 – 19 February 1983) was a British Labour Member of Parliament.

Rogers was educated at Middlesex elementary and grammar schools. He served as a councillor on Wembley Borough Council 1937–41 and worked as a railway clerk, then an industrial consultant with London Transport. He was a member of the TSSA. During World War II, he was a corporal in the Royal Signals.

Rogers was elected as MP for Kensington North in 1945. He was Secretary of the Parliamentary Painting Group 1950–1970 and Parliamentary Private Secretary to George Strauss, Minister of Supply from 1947 to 1949 and to Kenneth Younger, Minister of State for Foreign Affairs in 1950. He was a delegate to the United Nations Assembly in 1950, and to the Council of Europe and Western European Union from 1961 to 1963.

He served as an opposition Whip 1954–1964 and as Member of the Commons Chairmen's Panel 1952–54 and 1966. He was a Lord Commissioner of the Treasury and Government Whip, October 1964 – January 1966. Rogers was appointed a CBE in 1965 and stepped down from parliament in 1970.

Parliament of the United Kingdom
Preceded by James Duncan	Member of Parliament for Kensington North; 1945–1970	Succeeded by Bruce Douglas-Mann
