= Helen Ogston =

Scottish suffragette (1882–1973)

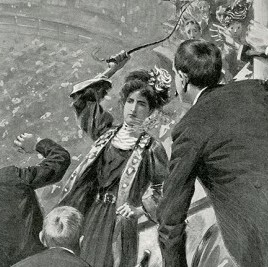
- detail of newspaper illustration by Samuel Begg
- Born: Helen Charlotte Elizabeth Douglas Ogston; 10 June 1882; Aberdeen, Scotland
- Died: 4 July 1973 (aged 91); Malvern, Worcestershire, England
- Education: University of Aberdeen
- Occupation: Suffragette
- Employer: WSPU
- Spouses: Dr Eugene Dunbar Townroe; Granville Havelock Bullimore
- Parent(s): Isabella and Prof Sir Alexander Ogston

Helen Charlotte Elizabeth Ogston later Townroe and then Bullimore (1882 – 1973) was a Scottish suffragette known for interrupting David Lloyd George on 5 December 1908 at a meeting in the Royal Albert Hall and subsequently holding off the stewards with a dog whip.

== Life ==
Ogston was born in Aberdeen in 1882, the daughter of a professor at Aberdeen University. Ogston married twice. Her father Prof Sir Alexander Ogston married twice. He had three children with his first wife and he later remarried Isabella Margaret Matthews and they had five children including Helen and Constance Amelia Irene. Helen obtained a science degree at the University of Aberdeen before moving south with her younger sister, Constance. She became a sanitary inspector and both of them became members of the Women's Social and Political Union in 1906.

On 5 December 1908, she attended a speaking engagement where David Lloyd George was speaking at the Albert Hall. The meeting was organised by the Women's Liberal Federation and although Lloyd George was to speak it was suspected that he would avoid addressing the most important issue of votes for women.

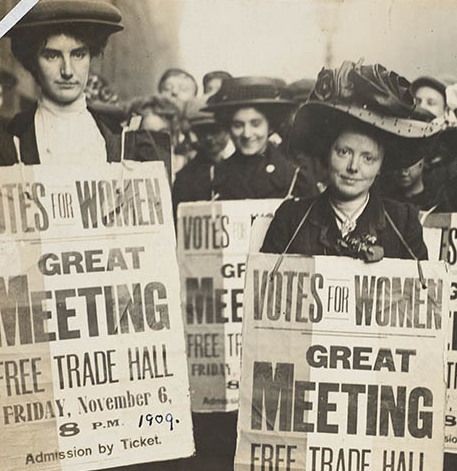
Helen Ogston and Mary Gawthorpe

The stewards tried to evict her and she pulled a dog whip. Whilst she was being evicted someone punched her chest and another burnt her wrist with a lit cigar. She featured in the local newspapers. As a result of the demonstration women were stopped from attending future talks by Lloyd George. Ogston noted her rationale for using the whip:

"a man put the lighted end of his cigar on my wrist; another struck me in the chest. The stewards rushed into the box and knocked me down. I said I would walk out quietly, but I would not submit to their handling. They all struck at me. I could not endure it. I do not think we should submit to such violence. It is not a question of being thrown out; we are set up on and beaten."

Ogston was working for the WSPU in Brighton in 1909 and speaking on their behalf in the south of England, but she became a paid organiser for the New Constitutional Society for Women's Suffrage in 1910.

Ogston married twice. She married Dr Eugene Dunbar Townroe on 4 May 1912 at King's College, Old Aberdeen, Scotland. She then married Granville Havelock Bullimore on 3 January 1929 at Norwich Norfolk.

Helen died on 4 July 1973 at Malvern Worcestershire.
