= Adeline Chapman =

English suffragette (1847–1931)

- Born: 27 August 1847
- Died: 20 January 1931 (aged 83)
- Other names: Adeline Mary Guest
- Known for: Campaigner for women's suffrage
- Spouses: Arthur Guest (m. 1867; died 1898) Cecil Maurice Chapman (m. 1899)

Adeline Mary Chapman (née Chapman; 27 August 1847 – 20 January 1931), first married name Adeline Guest, was an English campaigner for women's suffrage. She was a suffragist, and opposed the militancy of the suffragettes. Having been an early member of the Women's Social and Political Union, she was a member of the Central Society for Women's Suffrage from 1901. Unhappy with what she perceived as the ineffectiveness of the National Union of Women's Suffrage Societies (NUWSS), the main suffragist organisation, she was the founding president of the New Constitutional Society for Women's Suffrage (NCS).

The aim of the NCS was to lobby government, campaign against the governing Liberal Party candidates (as the party was then broadly anti-women's suffrage) and to explicitly "abstain from public criticism of other suffragists". From 1916, as president of the NCS, she attended the Consultative Committee of the Women's Constitutional Suffrage Societies: the aim of the Consultative Committee was successfully realized in the Representation of the People Act 1918 which gave the right to vote to women aged over 30 for the first time. With the rights for some women to vote obtained, the NCS dissolved in June 1918.

== Biography ==
Chapman was born on 27 August 1847 in Roehampton, Surrey, England, to David Barclay Chapman (1799–1891), a wealthy banker and his second wife Maria (née Chatfield; born 1810). She was brought up at Downshire House, a large house in Roehampton, and was educated at home alongside her many siblings by governesses.

On 23 April 1867, Chapman married Arthur Edward Guest (1841–1898). From 1867 to 1874, Arthur was the Conservative Member of Parliament for Poole. Together they had two children; their daughter Mildred Mansel (1868–1942), who would go on to marry Colonel J. D. Mansel, was a suffragette. By 1881, the marriage had failed and Adeline petitioned for divorce, citing her husband's adultery: however, the law was not on her side and her case was dismissed. The marriage ended instead in 1898 when Arthur died.

On 30 December 1899, Adeline married Cecil Maurice Chapman (1852–1938), a cousin of hers, during a service at St Margaret's Church, Westminster: the service was precided over by Henry Scott Holland assisted by the groom's brother Hugh Chapman. Cecil was a barrister, served as a Moderate Party councillor for Chelsea on the London County Council from 1896 to 1898, and was a Metropolitan Police magistrate from 1899 till he retired in 1924. As a magistrate, his "sentences were never unduly severe and his justice was always tempered with mercy". He was also a supporter of women's suffrage and divorce reform, publishing Marriage and Divorce: Some Needed Reforms in Church and State in 1911. Unlike her first marriage, her second one was a happy one.

In 1901, Chapman became a member of the Central Society for Women's Suffrage. She also gave money to the Women's Social and Political Union (WSPU) in its early years, before the WSPU became a suffragette organisation undertaking direct action and civil disobedience. In 1909, in reaction to the force feeding of suffragette prisoners, she decided to devote herself to campaigning for women's suffrage. Although she opposed the types of direct action undertaken by the suffragettes, she took part in the boycott of the 1911 Census and was a member of the Women's Tax Resistance League; for the latter, she had goods seized in lieu of tax in 1913.

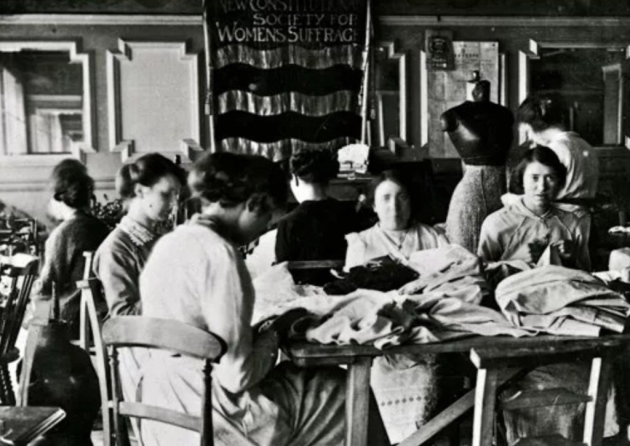
New Constitutional Society for Women's Suffrage office in 1914

Chapman believed the National Union of Women's Suffrage Societies (NUWSS), the main suffragist organisation, was insufficiently effective. On 5 January 1910, she was one of the founding members of the New Constitutional Society for Women's Suffrage (NCS). The aim of the NCS was "to unite all suffragists who believe in the anti-Government election policy, who desire to work by constitutional means, and to abstain from public criticism of other suffragists whose conscience leads them to adopt different methods". Chapman was the first, and only, president of the NCS. She was active in the role and regularly toured the country to speak at meetings.

In 1916, she became a member of the Consultative Committee of the Women's Constitutional Suffrage Societies and the representative from the NCS. This committee was set up in response by the government's proposal to extend the right to vote to more people after the end of the First World War. The committee's aim was to insure that women were included in this expanded electorate, and this was realised in the Representation of the People Act 1918 which granted the right to vote to women over 30 who satisfied the necessary property qualification. In June 1918, following the passing of the Act, the NCS dissolved.

Following the dissolution of the New Constitutional Society for Women's Suffrage, Chapman became a member of the Cavendish-Bentinck library (which would later become the Women's Library). Following the retirement of her husband in 1924, the couple lived at The Cottage, Roehampton. She died on 20 January 1931 from heart disease.
