= John Lloyd (political reformer) =

- Born: 3 September 1833; Dinas, Breconshire, Wales
- Died: 6 June 1915 (aged 81); Bayswater, London, England
- Burial place: Talachddu, Breconshire
- Occupations: Barrister, political reformer, antiquary
- Known for: Secretary of the London Municipal Reform League; Progressive Party councillor on London County Council

John Lloyd (3 September 1833 – 6 June 1915) was a Welsh-born barrister who became a prominent figure in the local government of London.

The son of John Lloyd of Dinas, Brecon, he was educated at Bridgnorth Grammar School before attending St John's College, Oxford. He did not graduate, instead leaving Oxford to manage his family's estates in Breconshire, Monmouthshire and Herefordshire.

He had been introduced to cricket at Bridgnorth and along with brothers Penry Lloyd and Thomas Conway Lloyd became a regular wicketkeeper/batsman for the South Wales Cricket Club. In 1864, he captained the side on tour against "Gentleman of Sussex" in a match played at the Royal Brunswick Ground. The match featured the first ever century in the career of W.G.Grace who struck 170 guesting for the South Wales team just before his 16th birthday, including a second wicket partnership of 188 with his captain who recorded his career best of 82.

In 1877, Lloyd moved to London, where he was called to the bar at the Middle Temple. In London he became involved in local government, and as secretary of the London Municipal Reform League campaigned for the creation of the London County Council. When the first elections to the county council were held in January 1889, he was elected as a Progressive Party councillor representing North Kensington. Re-elected in 1892, he was defeated in 1895 and failed to regain his council seat at subsequent elections.

He died at his home in Bayswater, London in 1915, aged 81. He was buried in Talachddu, Breconshire.
