= William Joseph Jarrett =

William Joseph Jarrett (5 February 1876 – 15 December 1943) was a British politician and trade unionist.

Born in North Kensington, in London, Jarrett received an elementary education before becoming a boot closer. He joined the Amalgamated Society of Boot and Shoe Makers and Repairers, eventually becoming the union's general president.

Jarrett was elected to Kensington Metropolitan Borough Council in 1906, and he became vice-president of Kensington Trades Council and Labour Party. He was also active in the Independent Labour Party, and chaired its North Kensington branch. He stood unsuccessfully for Kensington North at the 1913 London County Council election, and the equivalent constituency at the 1918, 1922 and 1923 UK general elections.

By 1925, much of the North Kensington Labour Party was sympathetic to the Communist Party of Great Britain. Jarrett was part of a minority who were not, and he was deselected as a councillor. He and two colleagues chose to stand as independent "Moderate Labour" candidates, and he put out a leaflet explaining the situation, which was publicised by the Daily Mail.
