= Roper Lethbridge =

British politician

Sir Roper Lethbridge KCIE

Member of Parliament for Kensington North
- In office 1885–1892
- Preceded by: New constituency
- Succeeded by: Frederick Frye

Personal details
- Born: 23 December 1840
- Died: 15 February 1919 (aged 78)
- Party: Conservative
- Education: Exeter College, Oxford

Sir Roper Lethbridge KCIE (23 December 1840 – 15 February 1919) was a British academic and civil servant in India and a Conservative Party politician who sat in the House of Commons from 1885 to 1892.

== Early life and education ==
Lethbridge was the son of E. Lethbridge of Ste. Addresse, France. He was educated at Exeter College, Oxford and entered Inner Temple in 1864.

== Career ==
He was appointed a professor in the Bengal Educational Department in 1868, and became a Fellow of University of Calcutta and Secretary of Simla Educational Commission. He was Editor of the Calcutta Quarterly Review from 1871 to 1878. In 1877, he moved to the Indian Political Department as Political Agent, 1st class, and was appointed Press Commissioner in 1878 when he was awarded Companion of the Indian Empire. He was knighted in 1885. Lethbridge was Hon. Member of the Anjuman-i-Punjab, a Member of the Asiatic Society and the Asiatic Society of Bengal and a Member of Council of East Indian Association and of the National Indian Association.

At the 1885 general election Lethbridge was elected as the Member of Parliament (MP) for Kensington North. He was re-elected in 1886 held the seat until he stood down at the 1892 election. He was awarded a KCIE in the 1890 Birthday Honours.

Lethbridge wrote several works about India.

He died at the age of 78.

== Personal life ==
Lethbridge married Eliza Finlay in 1865. Their daughter Caroline married Frederick Gorell Barnes. He married his second wife Emma Neave in 1897. They lived at Cornwall Terrace, Regent's Park, London.

== Publications ==
- A Short Manual of the History of India (1881)
- Lethbridge, Roper, Sir (1893). The History of India. London : Macmillan.
- Lethbridge, Roper (November 2006). The Indian Offer of Imperial Preference PS King 1913 and Read Books, 2006. Read Books. ISBN 1-4067-2001-1.
- The Golden Book of India: A Genealogical and Biographical Dictionary of the Ruling Princes, Chiefs, Nobles, and Other Personages, Titled Or Decorated of the Indian Empire. Aakar Books. 2005. ISBN 81-87879-54-8.
- Swadeshi and British Fiscal Policy
- Devon and Cornwall Notes and Queries 1919

Parliament of the United Kingdom
New constituency	Member of Parliament for Kensington North; 1885–1892	Succeeded by Frederick Frye
