= Frederick Frye =

Frederick Charlwood Frye (1845 – 20 March 1914) was a British grocer and Liberal Party politician.

== Business ==
In 1870 he formed the business partnership of Leverett, Frye, and Scholding, opening the first of a chain of grocery stores in Greenwich. Frye took sole control of the company in 1880. In 1892 the business was renamed Leverett & Frye, and by 1894, when it became a limited company, it had 50 stores in England and Ireland, concentrating on opening shops in newly developed suburbs. Frye became president of the Metropolitan Grocers Association and in 1891 helped found the Federation of Grocer's Associations of the United Kingdom.

Frye was a progressive employer, operating a profit-sharing scheme with his employees and was on the Radical wing of the Liberal Party. He became a member of the Metropolitan Board of Works, and in 1889 was elected to the first London County Council as a Progressive Party councillor representing North Kensington.

He stepped down from the council at the 1892 elections, having been nominated as Liberal candidate to contest the parliamentary seat of Kensington North. He was elected at the general election held later that year, serving one term in the House of Commons as a member of parliament before losing his seat in the next general election in 1895. His family faced financial problems in 1911. In 1912 his home and all its contents were auctioned.

He later became an alderman of Kensington Borough Council. He retired to Worthing on the Sussex coast, where he died aged 68.

== Family ==
Frye married Jane Kezia Crosbie and they had two daughters. The youngest was Katharine Frye who was born in 1878. She became an actress, suffragette and diarist.

Parliament of the United Kingdom
Preceded by Roper Lethbridge	Member of Parliament for Kensington North; 1892 – 1895	Succeeded by William Edward Thompson Sharpe
