= Fielding West =

British Labour Party politician (1892–1935)

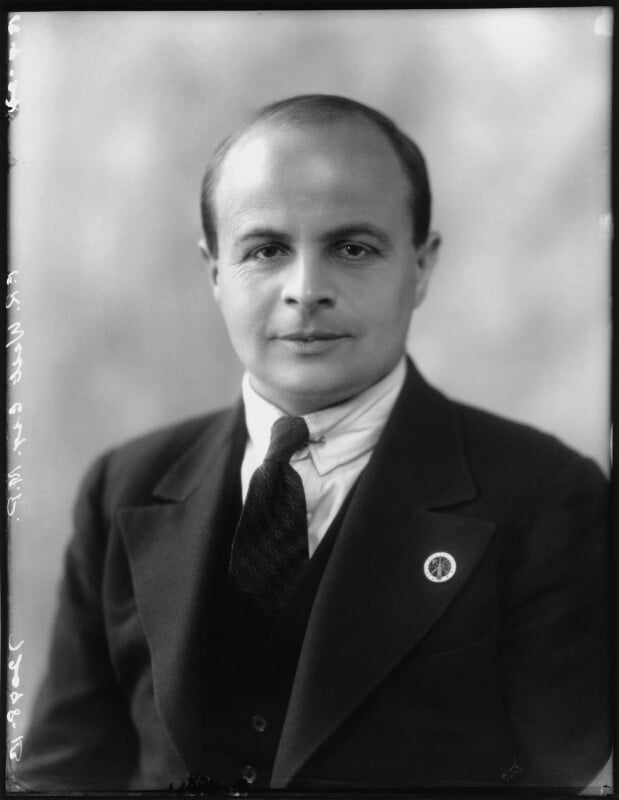
West in 1929

Fielding Reginald West (November 1892 – 6 October 1935) was a British Labour Party politician.

== Early life ==
West was born in Huddersfield, Yorkshire. Following elementary education at the age of 12, he initially worked in a coal mine before becoming a clerk in a Bradford textile factory. During the First World War he was a clerk in the Army Pay Corps. In 1916 he married Lily Noble and had one son. However, she died in childbirth. Later on, he married Peggy Reece and had two children, the first of whom died at one year old.

Following the war he moved to London where he attended the Regent Street Polytechnic and London Day Training College, before taking up employment as a schoolteacher at the London County Council West Kensington Central School.

== MP for Kensington North ==
At the 1929 general election, West contested the seat of Kensington North as a Labour Party candidate, and was elected, unseating the sitting Conservative MP, Percy Gates. Following the election a minority Labour government was formed. However this collapsed in 1931, and a National Government was formed. There was also a split in the Labour Party, with supporters of the Prime Minister, Ramsay MacDonald, forming a National Labour Organisation. The remainder of the party found itself in opposition to the government.

The National Government called an election in October 1931, which they won by a landslide. West was among many Labour MPs who lost their seats, defeated by the government candidate, James Duncan of the Conservative Party.

== MP for Hammersmith North ==
In March 1934 the Conservative MP for Hammersmith North died. West was chosen to contest the resulting by-election for the Labour Party. In a three-cornered contest with Conservative and Communist opponents, West was elected with a majority of 3,516 votes.

Fielding West died while in office of cancer at Hammersmith Hospital in October 1935.

Parliament of the United Kingdom
Preceded by Percy George Gates	Member of Parliament for Kensington North; 1929 – 1931	Succeeded by James Duncan
Preceded by Mary Pickford	Member of Parliament for Hammersmith North; 1934 – 1935	Succeeded by Denis Pritt
