= Leonard Stein (politician) =

Leonard Jacques Stein OBE (12 December 1887 – 23 April 1973), was a British political candidate, writer, barrister, Zionist activist, and President of the Anglo-Jewish Association.

== Background ==
He was the son of Philip Stein and Matilda Beaver of Manchester. He was educated at St Paul's School, London and Balliol College, Oxford. In 1910 he was President of the Oxford Union. In 1928 he married Sarah Kitay of Paterson, New Jersey, USA. They had one son (and one son deceased). In 1953 he was made an Officer of the Order of the British Empire.

== Professional career ==
In 1912 Stein received a Call to Bar, at the Inner Temple. He served in the Army from 1914 to 1920 (Staff-Captain, Palestine Military Administration and subsequently on Political Staff, EEF, in Jerusalem and at General Headquarters in Cairo from 1918 to 1920). He was Political Secretary of the World Zionist Organization from 1920 to 1929. He was Honorary Legal Adviser to the Jewish Agency for Palestine from 1929 to 1939. He was President of the Anglo-Jewish Association from 1939 to 1949. He was President of the Jewish Historical Society of England from 1964 to 1965.

== Political career ==
Stein was firstly Liberal candidate for the Dover division of Kent at the 1922 General Election. This was a safe Unionist seat that a Liberal had not won since 1857. The Unionists held the seat. He was then Liberal candidate for the Kensington North division of London at the 1923 General Election. This was a Unionist seat and not a good prospect either as the Liberals had come third in 1922. However, he did manage to increase the Liberal share of the vote;

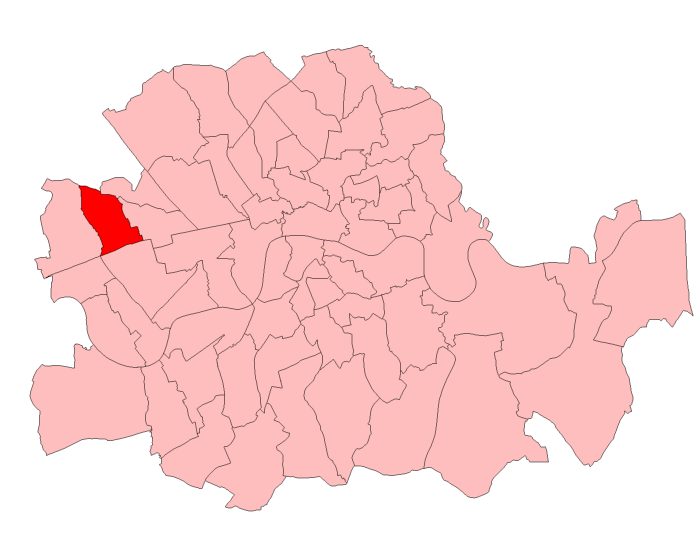
Kensington North in the County of London, showing boundaries used in 1923

1923 United Kingdom general election: Kensington, North Electorate 43,050
Party	Candidate	Votes	%	±%
Unionist	Percy George Gates	9,458	39.4	−13.7
Labour	William Joseph Jarrett	8,888	37.0	+10.2
Liberal	Leonard Jacques Stein	5,672	23.6	+3.5
Majority		570	2.4	
Turnout		43,050	55.8	+0.9
Unionist hold		Swing	-12.0	

He did not contest the 1924 General Election. He was then Liberal candidate for the Bermondsey West division of London at the 1929 General Election. This was a Labour seat that the Liberals had last won in 1923. He might have entertained hopes of regaining the seat, however the Unionists who had not run a candidate in 1923, chose to intervene. As a result, Labour comfortably held the seat;

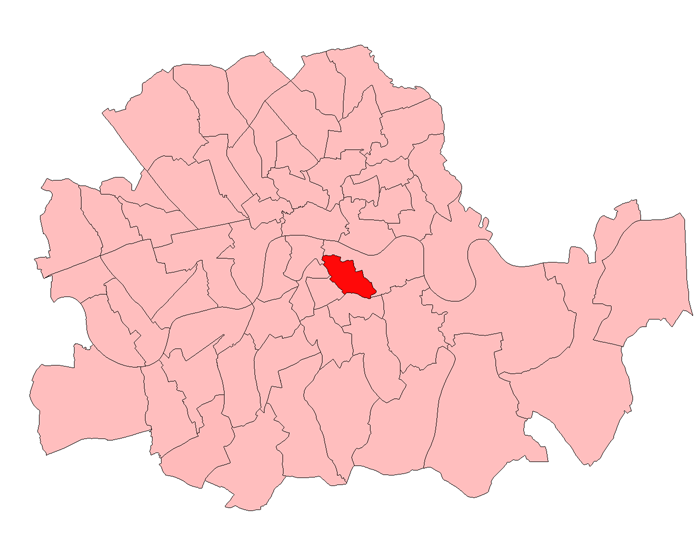
Bermondsey West within the County of London showing boundaries used in 1929

General Election 30 May 1929: Bermondsey West Electorate 32,963
Party	Candidate	Votes	%	±%
Labour	Alfred Salter	13,231	60.2	+3.0
Liberal	Leonard Jacques Stein	4,865	22.2	−20.6
Unionist	Herbert Cecil Butcher	3,852	17.6	n/a
Majority		8,366	38.0	+23.6
Turnout		32,963	66.6	−8.4
Labour hold		Swing	+11.8	

He did not stand for parliament again. After the split in the Liberal Party in 1931 he was active in the National Liberals as Vice-Chairman of their London organisation.

== Publications ==
- Edition of the Vicar of Wakefield, 1912
- The truth about Palestine : a reply to the Palestine Arab delegation, 1922
- Zionism, 1925, republished in new edition, 1932
- Syria, 1926
- (Joint) Tax Avoidance, 1936
- The National Defence Contribution, 1937
- The Excess Profits Tax, 1940
- The Balfour Declaration, 1961
- Weizmann and England, 1965
- (Joint Editor) Letters and Papers of Chaim Weizmann, Vol. I, 1968
