= Amalgamated Society of Boot and Shoe Makers =

Trade union in the United Kingdom

- Merged into: Union of Shop, Distributive and Allied Workers
- Founded: December 1861
- Dissolved: 1955
- Headquarters: 7 Cartwright Gardens, London
- Location: United Kingdom
- Members: 8,306 (1874)
- Affiliations: TUC

The Amalgamated Society of Boot and Shoe Makers (AABS) was a trade union representing workers involved in shoemaking in the United Kingdom.

The union was founded in December 1861 as the London United Societies of Cordwainers, bringing together fifteen small unions of London shoemakers and bootmakers. It proved highly successful, and within two years, it had 4,300 members in 84 branches across the city. Some of these branches were highly radical, with the West End Ladies' Shoemakers, led by George Odger, and the West End Boot Closers, led by Charles Murray, both affiliating with the First International. In March 1863, the union renamed itself the Amalgamated Society of Cordwainers, adopting the name used by a defunct union from 1845.

In 1868, members of the men's city branch went on strike, aiming to achieve a 10% pay increase. At its peak, the strike involved 2,000 workers, but it was unsuccessful, and with the branch in arrears, it was struck off. It worked with the West End and Marylebone branches, which had previously left, to campaign against the Cordwainers, but it rejoined early in the 1870s. With many of its London branches gone, the union managed to establish itself across the UK, and by the start of 1874, it had 8,306 members, with only 990 in London.

In 1873, the union renamed itself the Amalgamated Society of Boot and Shoe Makers, hoping to recruit the lower-paid riveters and finishers, many of whom worked in factories. This saw some success, but most riveters and finishers felt that the society did not represent their interests and split away in February 1874, forming the National Union of Boot and Shoe Rivetters and Finishers.

The union lost a significant proportion of its membership to its new rival, but it survived by focusing once more on workers hand-making shoes and boots, although it had a few machine workers as members, especially in Leicester. It soon reached a non-compete agreement with its rival, and in 1878, the two unions launched a joint recruitment campaign. By 1892, the union's membership had rebounded to 5,376 members, but this gradually fell, dropping to only 1,448 by 1910. In the 1920s, the union renamed itself the Amalgamated Society of Boot and Shoe Makers and Repairers, and it maintained its membership under the long-term leadership of secretary Peter Brennan and president William Joseph Jarrett.

In 1955, the union merged into the Union of Shop, Distributive and Allied Workers, by which time it had only 861 members remaining.

== General Secretaries ==
1861: George Dodson
1880s: Kenneth McCrae
1910s: Peter Brennan
1948: H. Ainsworth
