= Donald Piers Chesworth =

British politician (1923–1991)

Donald Piers Chesworth OBE

Warden of Toynbee Hall
- In office 1977–1987
- Preceded by: Walter Birmingham
- Succeeded by: Alan Lee Williams

Personal details
- Born: 30 January 1923
- Died: 24 May 1991 (aged 68)

Donald Piers Chesworth (1923–1991) OBE was a politician and administrator who was closely associated with labour causes. His papers are held by Queen Mary Archives. He was warden of Toynbee Hall from 1977 to 1987. Michael Meadowcroft described him as a “fine political fixer”.

== Selected appointments ==
His appointments included:

- Student and Overseas Secretary, International Union of Socialist Youth, 1947-1951
- Chairman, National Association of Labour Student Organisations, 1947
- Whip and Member of the Policy Committee, London County Council, 1952-1965
- Member, Board of Visitors, Hewell Grange Borstal, 1950-1952
- Chairman, Managers of Mayford Home Office Approved School, 1952-1958
- Labour Adviser, Tanganyika Government and Chairman, Territorial Minimum Wages Board, 1961-1962
- Labour Adviser, Mauritius Government and Chairman, Sugar Wages Councils, 1962-1965
- Council member, 1965-1976 and Chairman, 1967, 1968, 1970–1974, War on Want
- Director, Notting Hill Social Council, 1968-1977
- National Committee, UK Freedom from Hunger Campaigns, 1969-1976
- Executive Board, Voluntary Committee on Overseas Aid and Development, 1969-1976
- Member, ILEA Education Committee, 1970-1977
- Chairman, World Development Political Action Trust, 1971-1975
- Alderman, Royal Borough of Kensington and Chelsea, 1971-1977
- Chairman, Mauritius Salaries Commission, 1973-1977
- Member, Court of Governors, London School of Economics, 1973-1978
- South Metropolitan Conciliation Committee, Race Relations Board, 1975-1977
- Warden, Toynbee Hall, 1977-1987
- Vice-Chairman, Toynbee Housing Association, 1977-1986
- Governor, Tower Hamlets Adult Education Institute, 1978-1991
- Governor, City and East London College, 1978-1991
- Chairman, Mauritius Government Enquiry into position of families without wage earners, 1981
- Government Salaries Commissioner, Mauritius, 1987-1988
- Chairman, Tower Hamlets ILEA Tertiary Education Council, and Member Tertiary Education Board, 1987-1991
- Chairman, Spitalfields Heritage Centre, 1987-1991
