= Alan Burgoyne =

British politician

Burgoyne in 1918.

Lieutenant-Colonel Sir Alan Hughes Burgoyne (30 September 1880 – 26 April 1929) was a British Conservative politician.

== Life ==
He first contested King's Lynn in 1906. He was MP for Kensington North from 1910 to 1922. He was knighted in 1922. He joined the short-lived National Party, but rejoined the Conservatives before the 1918 general election. He was then MP for Aylesbury from 1924 to 1929.

Burgoyne was the author of Submarine Navigation Past and Present, published in 1903, and of The War Inevitable, published in 1908. The latter is an example of invasion literature in which a German invasion of England is defeated by the Anglo-Japanese Alliance.

== Sources ==
- Whitaker's Almanack, 1907 to 1918 and 1925 to 1929 editions
- Craig, F.W.S., British Parliamentary Election Results
- Leigh Rayment's Historical List of MPs
