= London Municipal Reform League =

The London Municipal Reform League was a pressure group operating in the Metropolitan Board of Works in London, formed in 1881 by John Lloyd, having a Liberal Party outlook. Its president from 1882 was Joseph Firth Bottomley Firth.

== See also ==
- London Municipal Society
- Municipal Reform Party
- Arthur Hobhouse, 1st Baron Hobhouse
