= Lunchtime with Wogan =

Lunchtime with Wogan is a British television series hosted by Terry Wogan which aired from 1972 to 1973 on ITV. It was produced by ATV and formed part of ITV's newly launched afternoon schedule, transmitting live between 13:00 and 13:30 on Tuesdays from 17 October 1972. All forty-four episodes are missing, believed lost, with only a "Christmas with the Stars" segment remaining which has now been released on the All Star Comedy Carnival DVD by Network DVD
