= William Edward Thompson Sharpe =

William Edward Thompson Sharpe (1834 – 5 November 1909) was a British colonial administrator and Conservative MP for Kensington North.

Educated at Trinity College, Dublin, Sharpe joined the Ceylon Civil Service in 1857 and became the commissioner of the North Western Province. He was called to the English bar by the Inner Temple in 1880.

After retiring from government service in 1889, he stood in the seat unsuccessfully in 1892, won it from the Liberals in 1895, held it in 1900, but stood down in 1906.

== Sources ==
- Leigh's historical list of MPs
- F.W.S. Craig British Parliamentary Election Results 1885-1918
- Whitaker's Almanack 1893 to 1906 editions
