= Kensington North =

Parliamentary constituency in the United Kingdom, 1885–1974

- Former borough constituency for the House of Commons

1885–February 1974
- Seats: One
- Created from: Chelsea
- Replaced by: Kensington

Kensington North was a parliamentary constituency centred on the Kensington district of west London. It returned one Member of Parliament (MP) to the House of Commons of the Parliament of the United Kingdom.

The constituency was created for the 1885 general election, and abolished for the February 1974 general election.

== Boundaries ==
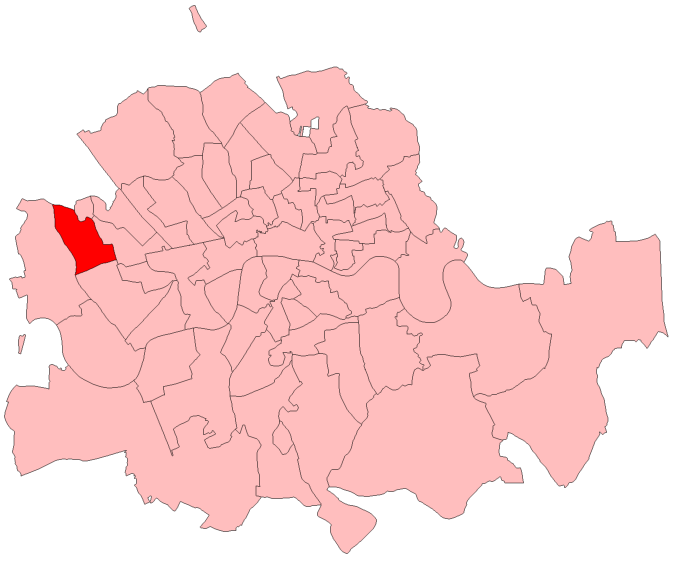
Kensington North in the Metropolitan area from 1885 to 1918

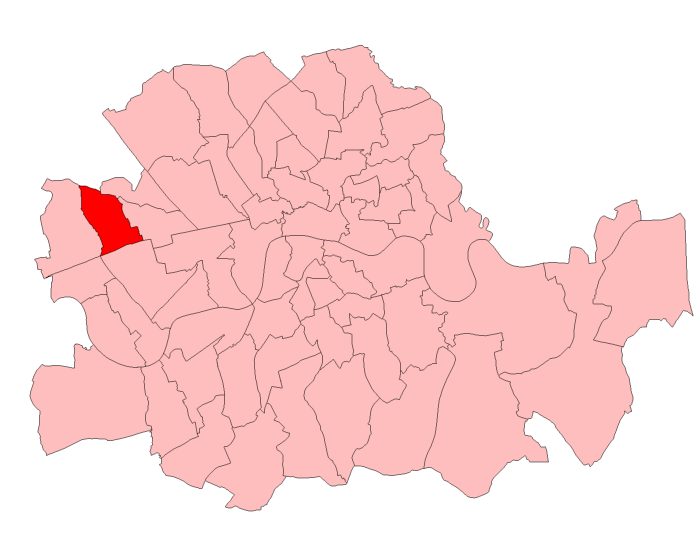
Kensington North in London from 1918 to 1950

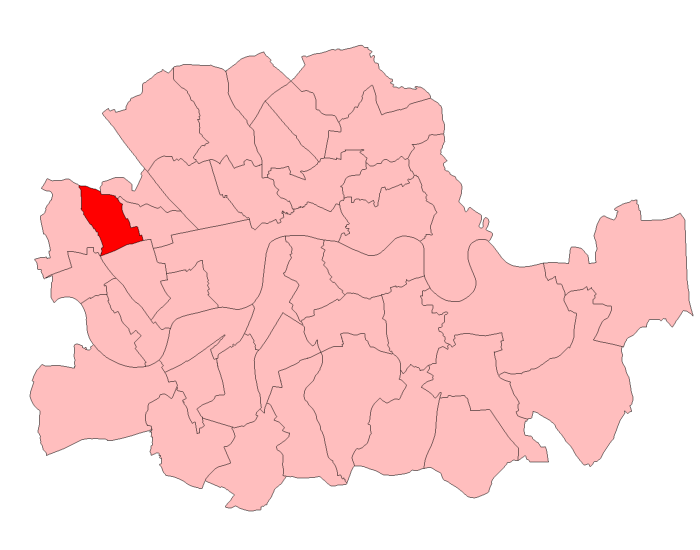
Kensington North in London from 1950 to 1974

wards of Kensington Metropolitan Borough in 1916

1918–1974: The Royal Borough of Kensington wards of Golborne, Norland, Pembridge, and St Charles.

In 1966, 9.8% of the constituency was born in the New Commonwealth.

== Members of Parliament ==
Election	Member	Party
1885	Sir Roper Lethbridge	Conservative
1892	Frederick Frye	Liberal
1895	William Edward Thompson Sharpe	Conservative
1906	Henry Yorke Stanger	Liberal
Jan. 1910	Alan Hughes Burgoyne	Conservative
1922	Percy George Gates	Conservative
1929	Fielding West	Labour
1931	James Duncan	Conservative
1945	George Rogers	Labour
1970	Bruce Douglas-Mann	Labour
Feb 1974	constituency abolished	

== Election results ==
=== Elections in the 1880s ===
General election 1885: Kensington, North
Party	Candidate	Votes	%	±%
Conservative	Roper Lethbridge	3,619	54.6	
Liberal	Joseph Bottomley Firth	3,011	45.4	
Majority		608	9.2	
Turnout		6,630	79.9	
Registered electors		8,297		
Conservative win (new seat)				

General election 1886: Kensington, North
Party	Candidate	Votes	%	±%
Conservative	Roper Lethbridge	3,394	58.1	+3.5
Liberal	Edmund Routledge	2,443	41.9	−3.5
Majority		951	16.2	+7.0
Turnout		5,837	70.4	−9.5
Registered electors		8,297		
Conservative hold		Swing	+3.5	

=== Elections in the 1890s ===
General election 1892: Kensington, North
Party	Candidate	Votes	%	±%
Liberal	Frederick Frye	3,503	51.5	+9.6
Conservative	William Edward Thompson Sharpe	3,293	48.5	−9.6
Majority		210	3.0	N/A
Turnout		6,796	75.4	+5.0
Registered electors		9,017		
Liberal gain from Conservative		Swing	+9.6	

General election 1895: Kensington, North
Party	Candidate	Votes	%	±%
Conservative	William Edward Thompson Sharpe	3,829	56.8	+8.3
Liberal	Frederick Frye	2,913	43.2	−8.3
Majority		916	13.6	N/A
Turnout		6,742	71.1	−4.3
Registered electors		9,482		
Conservative gain from Liberal		Swing	+8.3	

=== Elections in the 1900s ===
General election 1900: Kensington, North
Party	Candidate	Votes	%	±%
Conservative	William Edward Thompson Sharpe	3,257	56.3	−0.5
Liberal	Rufus Isaacs	2,527	43.7	+0.5
Majority		730	12.6	−1.0
Turnout		5,784	62.0	−9.1
Registered electors		9,323		
Conservative hold		Swing	−0.5	

Stanger

General election 1906: Kensington, North
Party	Candidate	Votes	%	±%
Liberal	Henry Yorke Stanger	4,416	56.8	+13.1
Conservative	Ellis Hume-Williams	3,358	43.2	−13.1
Majority		1,058	13.6	N/A
Turnout		7,774	75.7	+13.7
Registered electors		10,270		
Liberal gain from Conservative		Swing	+13.1	

=== Elections in the 1910s ===
General election January 1910: Kensington, North
Party	Candidate	Votes	%	±%
Conservative	Alan Burgoyne	4,611	53.1	+9.9
Liberal	Henry Robson	4,079	46.9	−9.9
Majority		532	6.2	N/A
Turnout		8,690	86.0	+10.3
Conservative gain from Liberal		Swing		

General election December 1910: Kensington, North
Party	Candidate	Votes	%	±%
Conservative	Alan Burgoyne	4,223	54.7	1.6
Liberal	Frank Murray Carson	3,494	45.3	−1.6
Majority		729	9.4	+3.2
Turnout		7,717	76.4	−9.6
Conservative hold		Swing		

General election 1918: Kensington, North
Party		Candidate	Votes	%	±%
C	Unionist	Alan Burgoyne	13,176	78.3	+23.6
	Labour	William Joseph Jarrett	3,653	21.7	New
Majority			9,523	56.6	+11.2
Turnout			16,829	44.2	−32.2
	Unionist hold		Swing		
C indicates candidate endorsed by the coalition government.

=== Election in the 1920s ===
General election 1922: Kensington, North
Party	Candidate	Votes	%	±%
Unionist	Percy George Gates	12,328	53.1	−25.2
Labour	William Joseph Jarrett	6,225	26.8	+5.1
Liberal	Charles William Hayward	4,666	20.1	New
Majority		6,103	26.3	−30.3
Turnout		23,219	54.9	+10.7
Unionist hold		Swing	-15.2	

General election 1923: Kensington North
Party	Candidate	Votes	%	±%
Unionist	Percy George Gates	9,458	39.4	−13.7
Labour	William Joseph Jarrett	8,888	37.0	+10.2
Liberal	Leonard Stein	5,672	23.6	+3.5
Majority		570	2.4	−23.9
Turnout		24,018	55.8	+0.9
Unionist hold		Swing	-12.0	

General election 1924: Kensington, North
Party	Candidate	Votes	%	±%
Conservative	Percy George Gates	16,255	53.0	+13.6
Labour	Fielding West	14,401	47.0	+10.0
Majority		1,854	6.0	+3.6
Turnout		30,656	69.6	+13.8
Conservative hold		Swing	+3.6	

General election 1929: Kensington North
Party	Candidate	Votes	%	±%
Labour	Fielding West	19,701	48.4	+1.4
Unionist	Percy George Gates	15,511	38.1	−14.9
Liberal	Frances Stewart	5,516	13.5	New
Majority		4,190	10.3	N/A
Turnout		40,728	68.5	−1.1
Labour gain from Unionist		Swing	+8.1	

=== Election in the 1930s ===
General election 1931: Kensington, North
Party	Candidate	Votes	%	±%
Conservative	James Duncan	27,860	63.7	+25.6
Labour	Fielding West	15,843	36.3	−12.1
Majority		12,017	27.4	N/A
Turnout		43,703	71.9	+3.4
Conservative gain from Labour		Swing	+18.8	

General election 1935: Kensington, North
Party	Candidate	Votes	%	±%
Conservative	James Duncan	18,907	53.2	−10.5
Labour	Frank Carter	15,309	43.1	+6.8
Liberal	John Seymour Spon	1,323	3.7	New
Majority		3,598	10.1	−17.3
Turnout		35,539	60.6	−11.3
Conservative hold		Swing	-8.7	

=== Election in the 1940s ===
General election 1945: Kensington, North
Party	Candidate	Votes	%	±%
Labour	George Rogers	16,838	56.6	+13.5
Conservative	James Duncan	10,699	36.0	−17.2
Liberal	John Richard Colclough	2,212	7.4	+3.7
Majority		6,139	20.6	N/A
Turnout		29,749	70.2	+9.6
Labour gain from Conservative		Swing	+15.4	

=== Elections in the 1950s ===
General election 1950: Kensington North
Party	Candidate	Votes	%	±%
Labour	George Rogers	21,615	50.65	
Conservative	Leonard Caplan	17,991	42.15	
Liberal	Robert Rufus Carey Evans	2,522	5.91	
Communist	M.J. Eyre	551	1.29	New
Majority		3,624	8.50	
Turnout		42,679	78.34	
Labour hold		Swing		

General election 1951: Kensington, North
Party	Candidate	Votes	%	±%
Labour	George Rogers	22,686	52.99	
Conservative	Leonard Caplan	18,543	43.31	
Liberal	Anthony Graeme Gamble	1,583	3.70	
Majority		4,143	9.68	
Turnout		42,812	79.16	
Labour hold		Swing		

General election 1955: Kensington, North
Party	Candidate	Votes	%	±%
Labour	George Rogers	20,226	53.92	
Conservative	Robert Bulbrook	17,283	46.08	
Majority		2,943	7.84	
Turnout		37,509	69.73	
Labour hold		Swing		

General election 1959: Kensington, North
Party	Candidate	Votes	%	±%
Labour	George Rogers	14,925	42.75	−11.17
Conservative	Robert Bulbrook	14,048	40.24	−5.84
Liberal	Michael Louis Hydleman	3,118	8.93	New
Union Movement	Oswald Mosley	2,821	8.08	New
Majority		877	2.51	−5.33
Turnout		34,912	67.83	−1.90
Labour hold		Swing	−2.7	

=== Elections in the 1960s ===
General election 1964: Kensington North
Party	Candidate	Votes	%	±%
Labour	George Rogers	15,283	49.50	
Conservative	Andrew Bowden	12,771	41.37	
Liberal	Yvonne C Richardson	2,819	9.13	
Majority		2,512	8.13	
Turnout		30,873	61.32	
Labour hold		Swing		

General election 1966: Kensington North
Party	Candidate	Votes	%	±%
Labour	George Rogers	16,012	54.79	
Conservative	Leon Brittan	10,749	36.78	
Liberal	Anthony Clive S Thomas	2,462	8.42	
Majority		5,263	18.01	
Turnout		29,223	62.07	
Labour hold		Swing		

=== Election in the 1970s ===
General election 1970: Kensington North
Party	Candidate	Votes	%	±%
Labour	Bruce Douglas-Mann	13,175	52.8	−2.0
Conservative	Leon Brittan	9,792	39.2	+2.4
Liberal	Patrick Spencer	1,990	7.9	−0.5
Majority		3,383	13.6	−4.4
Turnout		24,957	57.4	−4.7
Labour hold		Swing		
