= Leverett & Frye =

Former chain of grocery stores

Leverett & Frye was a chain of high-class grocery stores which was founded in 1870 in Greenwich, England, as Leverett, Frye, and Scholding. The chain expanded throughout Great Britain and Ireland, having over fifty branches at its peak.

Frederick Frye's partnership with Arthur Scholding was dissolved in 1892 and the business continued with Frye as the sole proprietor. In 1894, it became a limited company under the name Leverett & Frye Ltd..
