= Percy Gates =

British politician (1863–1940)

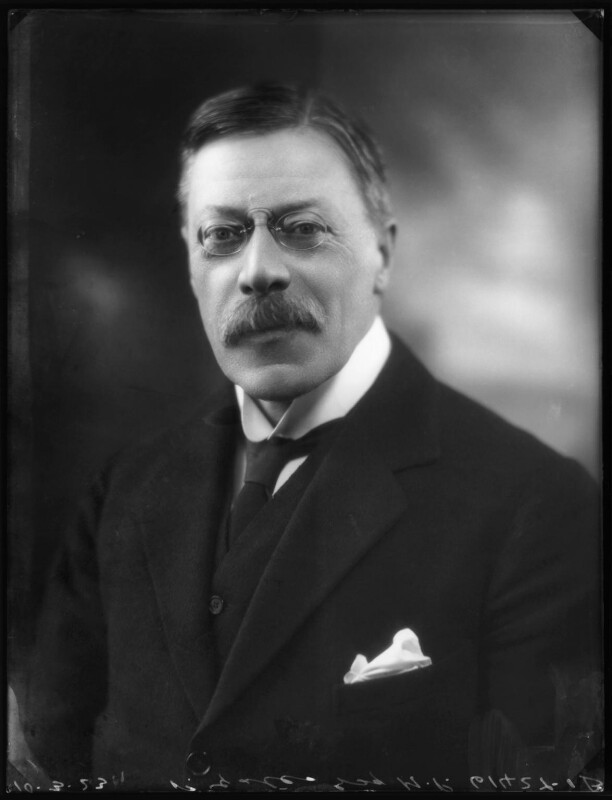
Gates in 1923

Percy George Gates (1863 – 31 March 1940) was a British solicitor and Conservative MP for Kensington North.

The son of Philip Chasemore Gates, KC, Recorder of Brighton, Gates was educated at Wellington College. Having practised for many years as a solicitor and parliamentary agent, he succeeded to an interest in the Westminster Brewery which in 1906 amalgamated with Lion Brewery.

He first won Kensington North in 1922, and held it until 1929 when he lost it to Labour. He was also a member of the London County Council for the Westminster ward, for the Municipal Reform Party, from 1911 to 1919.

He was also a Master of the Worshipful Company of Brewers.

== Sources ==
The Times 14 August 1911, page 11

- Whitaker's Almanack 1922 to 1930 editions
- Leigh's Historical List of MPs
- Craig, F.W.S British Parliamentary Election Results
